= Michelsamt =

Former bailiwick of Lucerne, Switzerland

- Bailiwick of Lucerne
- until 1798

The Michelsamt was a territory in which the provost of the chapter of Beromünster held rights of jurisdiction, and later, until 1798, a bailiwick of Lucerne. Around 1300 it comprised Beromünster, Gunzwil, Neudorf, Pfeffikon and Schwarzenbach, the exclaves of Ermensee and Schongau, and the Eiamt on both sides of Lake Sempach. In 1415 Lucerne acquired the imperial advocacy over the chapter and the protectorate over the Michelsamt, and from 1420 it held the high jurisdiction there. During the Helvetic Republic the territory was divided among the districts of Sempach, Sursee and Münster.

== History ==
According to the Habsburg land register (Habsburger Urbar), around 1300 the Michelsamt comprised Beromünster, Gunzwil, Neudorf, Pfeffikon, Schwarzenbach, the exclaves of Ermensee and Schongau, and the Eiamt on both sides of Lake Sempach, which consisted of Schenkon, Sigerswil (in the municipality of Grosswangen), Werligen (in the municipality of Neuenkirch) and the lower parts of the municipalities of Nottwil and Oberkirch.

Under the first written definition of the rights of the provost and the advocate (Vogt), in 1036, the advocate was responsible for protecting the provost's lordly rights, for the court over theft and minor offenses (Frevel) in the whole office except in the market town (Flecken) of Münster (Beromünster), for collecting the advocate's tax (Vogtsteuer) and for calling up men for military service, which required the provost's consent. The provost held the low jurisdiction, the authentication of mortgage transactions, and the right to collect the heriot (Fall) and other dues.

In 1415 Lucerne acquired the imperial advocacy (Reichsvogtei) over the chapter and the protectorate (Schirmherrschaft) over the Michelsamt. From 1415 to 1420 Sursee held the high jurisdiction in the Michelsamt, and from 1420 Lucerne. Treaties of 1420 and 1469 regulated the rights of Lucerne and of the chapter, although from the 16th century onward the city gradually pushed back the chapter's lordly rights. The bailiff (Landvogt) of the Michelsamt was always a member of Lucerne's Small Council. The Michelsamt was organized into the seven courts of Gunzwil, Oberkirch, Rickenbach, Ermensee, Schongau, Pfeffikon and Neudorf, plus the market town of Beromünster.

In 1443 the boundaries with the bailiwicks (Ämter) of Ruswil and Rothenburg were fixed, after the people of Ruswil had moved the boundary of the Eiamt down from the heights of the Nottwilerberg and the Leidenberg toward the lake. Eich, which around 1300 was part of the Habsburg administrative district of Sempach, was assigned to the Michelsamt before 1420 and, within it, to the Eiamt in the 17th century.

During the Helvetic Republic, Nottwil and Eich belonged to the district of Sempach, Oberkirch and Schenkon to the district of Sursee, and the rest of the Michelsamt to the district of Münster. Ermensee and Schongau came to the district (Amt) of Hochdorf in 1803 and 1813 respectively, and the rest of the old Michelsamt to the district of Sursee.

== Bibliography ==
- F. Glauser, J. J. Siegrist, Die Luzerner Pfarreien und Landvogteien, 1977
- G. Egloff, Herr in Münster: Die Herrschaft des Kollegiatsstiftes St. Michael in Beromünster in der Luzerner Landvogtei Michelsamt am Ende des Mittelalters und in der frühen Neuzeit (1420–1700), 2003
