= Beromünster Abbey =

Collegiate chapter in Switzerland

- Stift Beromünster
- Collegiate church of St. Michael
- Interactive map of Beromünster Abbey

Monastery information
- Order: Secular canons
- Established: c. 920
- Dedication: Archangel Michael
- Diocese: Basel (since 1828)

People
- Founder: Bero

Site
- Location: Beromünster, canton of Lucerne, Switzerland
- Coordinates: 47.20603°N 8.189733°E

Beromünster Abbey (German: Stift Beromünster) is a collegiate chapter of secular canons, dedicated to the Archangel Michael, in Beromünster in the canton of Lucerne, Switzerland. It belonged to the Diocese of Constance until 1814 and has belonged to the Diocese of Basel since 1828. Its foundation is dated, with uncertainty, to around 920, and it is first mentioned in a charter of 1036 as Peronis monasterium ... sancti Michaelis. In 1045 King Henry III made it an imperial chapter (Reichsstift). Its provost held the courts in the twelve villages of the Michelsamt, where Lucerne held the high jurisdiction from 1420. The government of Lucerne still appoints the provost and the canons.

== History ==
The early history of the chapter is obscure. Archaeological investigations do not contradict the thesis of Josef Siegwart that a chapter dedicated to St. Stephen was founded around 915/920, that in the 970s it moved from St. Stephen's Church to the new St. Michael's Church, and that in 1034 Count Ulrich I of Lenzburg transferred the tomb of the founder, Bero, to the new church. In 1036 Ulrich also laid down the property and rights of the advocate (Vogt) and the rights of the chapter. In 1045 King Henry III raised Beromünster to an imperial chapter. After the Lenzburgs died out in 1173, the advocacy (Kastvogtei) passed to the Kyburgs, and from them by inheritance in 1264 to the Habsburgs. When the Confederates conquered the Aargau, the Lucernese advanced into the Michelsamt and acquired the imperial advocacy (Reichsvogtei) over the chapter. In 1415 the high jurisdiction first passed as a pledge to the town of Sursee, but it was ceded to Lucerne as early as 1420. Two treaties, of 1420 and 1469, governed the legal relations between Lucerne and the chapter until 1798.

The letter of protection issued by Emperor Frederick Barbarossa in 1173 gives a first overview of the chapter's possessions, a large part of which came from donations by the counts of Lenzburg. Its landholdings lay mainly in the upper Wynental around Beromünster and extended into the neighboring valleys of Lake Sempach, Lake Baldegg and Lake Hallwil. Other concentrations of property lay in the Wiggertal near Richenthal and on the Aare between Solothurn and Aarau. The scattered, distant estates on Lake Biel (Nugerol) and Lake Morat (Vully), in Obwalden (Kerns), on the Rhine (Magden) and at Müllheim in Baden were already given up in the late Middle Ages. As head of the imperially immediate chapter, the provost held immunity rights over the chapter's possessions and the courts in the twelve villages of the Michelsamt, while the advocate exercised the high jurisdiction. A dispute between the provost and the Kyburgs, in the course of which the chapter was held to ransom, could be ended only after the emperor placed the Kyburgs under the imperial ban; the boundary between the two jurisdictions was then recorded in a charter of 1223. The chapter's property and rights were supplemented by a number of patronage rights over parish churches. In the 18th century the chapter's rights of collation extended to the parishes of Beromünster, Doppleschwand, Grossdietwil, Grosswangen, Hägglingen, Hochdorf, Inwil, Neudorf, Pfeffikon, Rain, Richenthal, Rickenbach, Rothenburg, Sarnen, Schongau and Schwarzenbach, and to the Reformed communities of Küttigen (parish of Kirchberg) and Gontenschwil.

As early as 1036 the chapter had received the right to elect its provost freely. Under the Habsburgs' protective advocacy (Schirmvogtei) this right gradually passed to the advocate, which the chapter confirmed in a charter in 1400. In 1480 Lucerne had Pope Sixtus IV confirm its full right to confer the provostship and the canonries. The government of Lucerne still elects the provost from three candidates proposed by the bishop, who invests him after the election. Episcopal confirmation or investiture was already provided for in the oldest recorded statutes, the Matricula ecclesiae Beronensis of 1326, but it was practiced only after the Council of Trent, and only for a short time (1587–1617). At first the canons probably followed the Rule of Aachen of 816 or the canonical reform of the 10th century. After the fire of 1217 the common life (vita communis) was given up, and the property was divided into 24 prebends. After a first revision of the statutes under Provost Ulrich Martin (1517–1557), a second revision at the beginning of the 17th century led to disputes over competences between the provost and the chapter and could be completed only under Provost Bernhard Hartmann (1688–1703). These statutes remained in force until the last revision in 1928.

From the beginning of the 14th century at the latest, the chapter had 21 canonries and a good dozen chaplaincies. From 1415 the canons' prebends were fiefs (Mannlehen) of the town of Lucerne and were filled by its Small Council; the right of appointment still lies with the government of Lucerne. Since the Wessenberg Concordat of 1806, all canons' positions except two have been reserved for former parish priests (Emeritenanstalt, an institution for retired clergy). The provost is the head of the chapter. The second position is held by the custodian (Kustos), who administers the church treasury and settles disputes within the church walls. The extension of his jurisdiction to the chapter precinct (Freiung) met with opposition from the provost: under a decision of the council of Lucerne in 1483, the provost's sworn court judged minor offenses (Frevel) within the chapter precinct, the area of immunity.

== School and music ==
The chapter's cultural influence came above all through its school and its liturgy. The beginnings of the chapter school go far back into the Middle Ages. It was directed by the scholasticus, who is mentioned in a charter of 1226. From the late 16th century the school followed the Jesuit curriculum. In 1866 it was converted into a lower grammar school (Progymnasium) with secondary classes (Realklassen); it was separated from the chapter in 1964 and expanded in 1977 into a full cantonal school leading to the Matura. In connection with the celebration of the liturgy, a rich musical culture was cultivated, above all in the 17th and 18th centuries. Well-known composers wrote instrumental and vocal works especially for Beromünster, for example polychoral masses by Franz Joseph Leonti Meyer von Schauensee and by Anton Stamitz, the brother of Karl Stamitz. A large music collection, which contains many unique manuscripts, attests to this. The church treasury, with its precious vestments, also attests to the chapter's cultural life.

== Buildings ==
The chapter precinct adjoins the western edge of the market town (Flecken) of Beromünster. The canons' houses are arranged in a circle around the collegiate church. On the boundary with the market town stand the buildings that once served as the market hall (Schal), the chapter cellar and the administrative building (the Hirschen). Archaeological investigations in 1975–1983 established the building history of the collegiate church. Only sparse remains of the first, pre-Romanesque building of the 10th century survive, and they do not allow a reconstruction; terracing work before the construction of the second building almost completely leveled its foundations. The second church, from around 1036, which still survives in the walls of the remodeled Baroque building, was a basilica with a nave and two aisles divided by columns and a slightly projecting transept that opened to the east into three apses. The alterations of the 13th to 15th centuries mainly affected the crypt and the choir area inside; the choir was extended ever further into the nave. In the late Middle Ages the exterior was changed by the construction of a tower and a sacristy. The church acquired its present appearance in two phases of rebuilding in the 1690s and 1770s. Apart from the interior furnishings, the most striking changes were the construction of a dome over the crossing and of an entrance hall on the west side. Until 1693 a cross-shaped cemetery chapel (St. Peter's Chapel) from the early 11th century stood in front of the west front of the church, in a courtyard enclosed by buildings like an atrium; it was later used for the parish functions of the chapter's parish.

== Bibliography ==
- Die Kunstdenkmäler des Kantons Luzern, vol. 4, 1956, pp. 7–156
- J. Siegwart, "Die Gründungsgeschichte von Beromünster", in Der Geschichtsfreund 117, 1964, pp. 133–171
- Helvetia Sacra, II/2, pp. 162–214
- P. Eggenberger, Das Stift Beromünster, 1986
- L. Meyer, Das Chorherrenstift Beromünster, 1313–1500, licentiate thesis, University of Zurich, 1987
- G. Egloff, Herr in Münster: Die Herrschaft des Kollegiatstiftes St. Michael in Beromünster in der luzernischen Landvogtei Michelsamt am Ende des Mittelalters und in der frühen Neuzeit (1420–1700), 2003
