= Sempach =

- Municipality
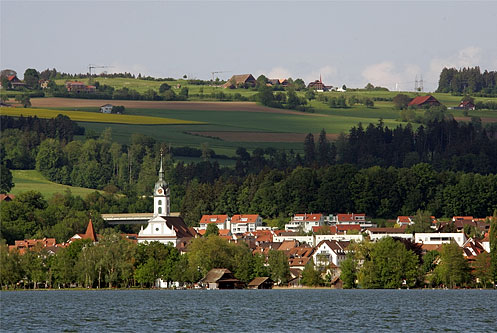

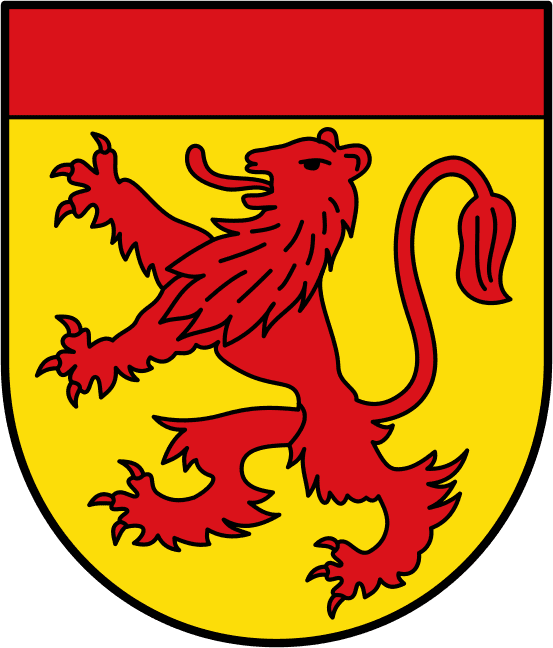
- Coat of arms
- Location of Sempach
- Location within Switzerland Location within Canton of Lucerne
- Coordinates: 47°8′N 8°12′E
- Country: Switzerland
- Canton: Lucerne
- District: Sursee

Area
  - Total: 8.95 km^{2} (3.46 sq mi)
- Elevation: 513 m (1,683 ft)

Population (Dec 2015)
  - Total: 4,159
  - Density: 465/km^{2} (1,200/sq mi)
- Time zone: UTC+01:00 (CET)
  - Summer (DST): UTC+02:00 (CEST)
- Postal code: 6204
- SFOS number: 1102
- ISO 3166 code: CH-LU
- Surrounded by: Eich, Hildisrieden, Neudorf, Neuenkirch, Nottwil
- Website: www.sempach.ch

Sempach (German pronunciation: [ˈzɛmpax]) is a municipality and a historic town in the district of Sursee in the canton of Lucerne in Switzerland.

== History ==
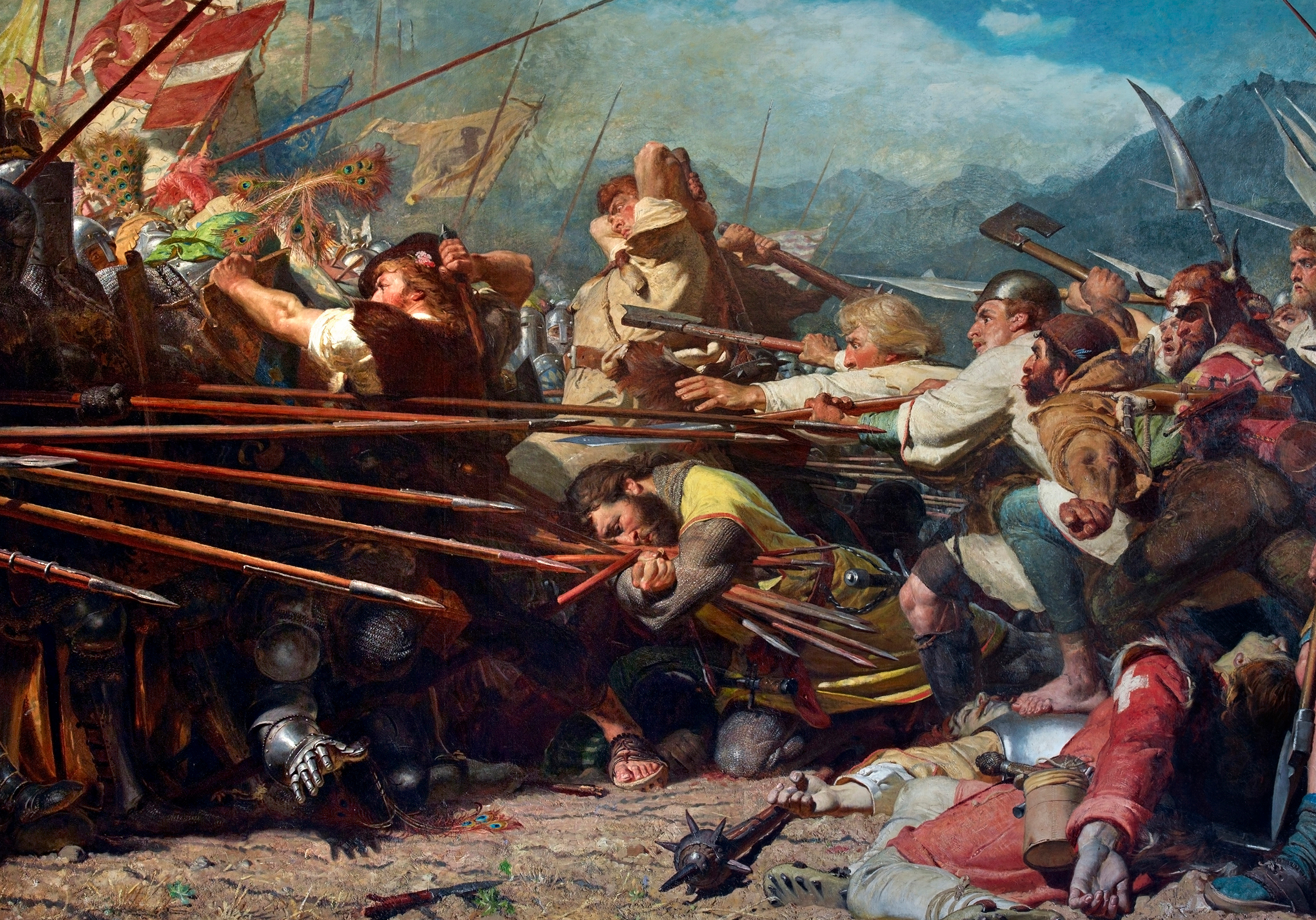
Arnold von Winkelried at the Battle of Sempach

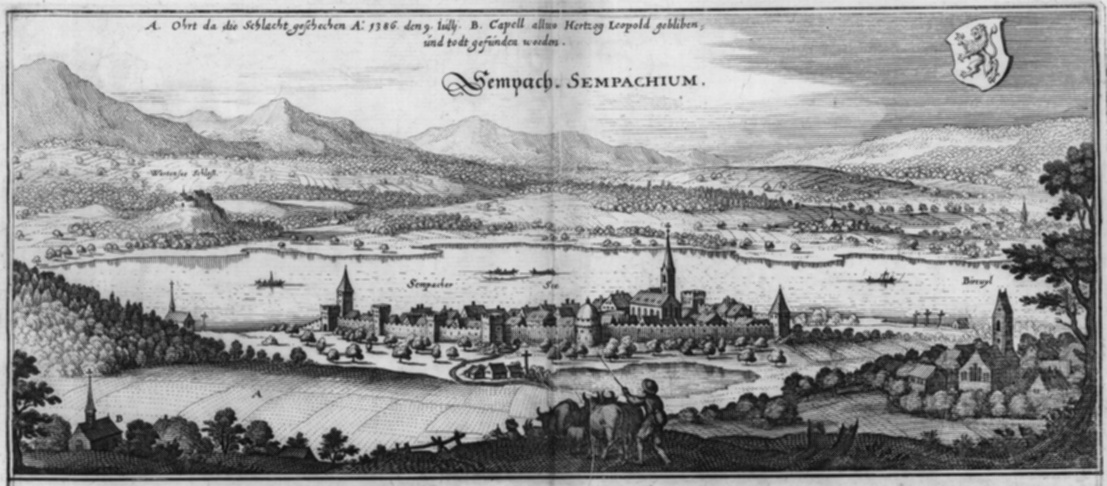
A 1654 print of Sempach from Topographia Helvetiae, Rhaetiae et Valesiae

It has retained some traces of its medieval appearance, especially the main gateway, beneath a watch tower, and reached by a bridge over the old moat. About half an hour distant to the north-east, on the hillside, is the site of the famous Battle of Sempach (9 July 1386), in which the Swiss defeated the Austrians, whose leader, Duke Leopold, lost his life. The legendary deed of Arnold of Winkelried is associated with this victory. The spot is now marked by an ancient and picturesque Battle Chapel (restored in 1886) and by a modern monument to Winkelried.

A few years later, in 1393, the so-called Sempacherbrief was signed between the Acht Orte (the original eight Swiss cantons), plus the associated Canton of Solothurn. It was the first document signed by all eight (plus Solothurn), but it also defined that none of them was to unilaterally start a war without the consent of all the others.

Some miles north of Sempach is the quaint village of Beromünster (973 inhabitants in 1900), with a collegiate church founded in the 10th century and dating, in parts, from the 11th and 12th centuries (fine 17th-century choir stalls and altar frontals), the chapter of secular canons now consisting of invalided priests of the canton of Lucerne: it was in Beromünster that the first dated book was printed (1470) in Switzerland, by care of the canons, while thence came Gering who introduced printing into France.

Sempach is the site of the Sempach Bird Observatory.

== Geography ==
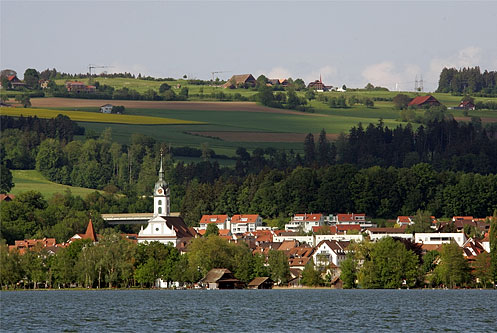
Lake Sempach with the village of Sempach on the far side

Aerial view (1954)

Sempach has an area, (as of the 2004/09 survey) of 8.91 km^{2} (3.44 sq mi). Of this area, about 63.9% is used for agricultural purposes, while 14.1% is forested. Of the rest of the land, 20.7% is settled (buildings or roads) and 1.3% is unproductive land. Over the past two decades (1979/85-2004/09) the amount of land that is settled has increased by 61 ha (150 acres) and the agricultural land has decreased by 67 ha (170 acres).

In the 1997 land survey, 14.53% of the total land area was forested. Of the agricultural land, 63.8% is used for farming or pastures, while 4.92% is used for orchards or vine crops. Of the settled areas, 6.37% is covered with buildings, 0.89% is industrial, 0.22% is classed as special developments, 1.23% is parks or greenbelts and 7.6% is transportation infrastructure. Of the unproductive areas, 0.34% is unproductive standing water (ponds or lakes), and 0.11% is other unproductive land.

It is built above the eastern shore of Lake Sempach, and about 2 miles (3.2 km) by road north of the Sempach railway station (9 miles (14 km) N.W. of Lucerne) on the main line between Lucerne and Olten.

Steinibühlweiher is located above the town.

== Demographics ==
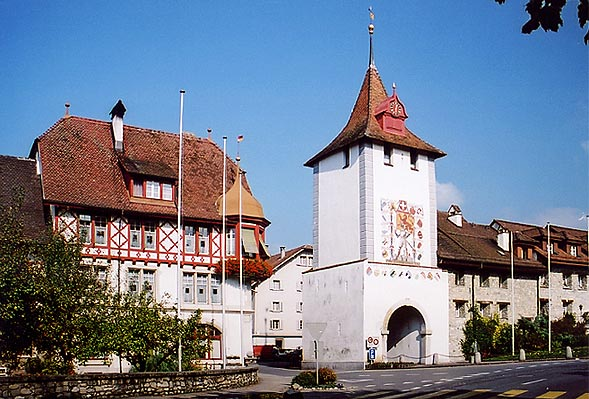
The Lucerne gate (Luzernertor) at the entrance to Sempach

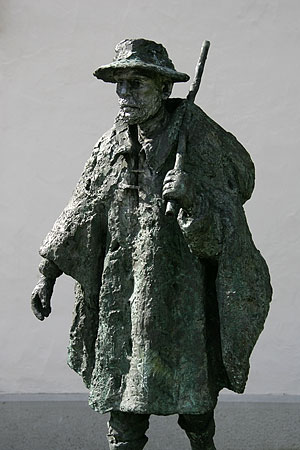
Statue at the Luzernertor

Sempach has a population (as of December 2020) of 4,234. As of 2014, 7.9% of the population are resident foreign nationals. Over the last 4 years (2010–2014) the population has changed at a rate of 3.52%. The birth rate in the municipality, in 2014, was 12.3, while the death rate was 5.0 per thousand residents.

As of 2014, children and teenagers (0–19 years old) make up 24.6% of the population, while adults (20–64 years old) are 61.0% and seniors (over 64 years old) make up 14.4%. In 2015 there were 1,896 single residents, 1,904 people who were married or in a civil partnership, 149 widows or widowers and 210 divorced residents.

In 2014 there were 1,598 private households in Sempach with an average household size of 2.58persons. Of the 635 inhabited buildings in the municipality, in 2000, about 58.0% were single family homes and 18.3% were multiple family buildings. Additionally, about 14.0% of the buildings were built before 1919, while 21.4% were built between 1991 and 2000. In 2013 the rate of construction of new housing units per 1000 residents was 5.78. The vacancy rate for the municipality, in 2015, was 0.64%. As of 2000 there were 615 inhabited buildings in the municipality, of which 474 were built only as housing, and 141 were mixed use buildings. There were 358 single family homes, 44 double family homes, and 72 multi-family homes in the municipality. Most homes were either two (248) or three (163) story structures. There were only 16 single story buildings and 47 four or more story buildings.

Most of the population (as of 2000) speaks German (93.8%), with Albanian being second most common (2.2%) and Spanish being third (0.7%).

== Historic population ==
The historical population is given in the following chart:

== Economy ==
As of 2013, there were a total of 1,878 people employed in the municipality. Of these, a total of 137 people worked in 32 businesses in the primary economic sector. The secondary sector employed 650 workers in 55 separate businesses. Finally, the tertiary sector provided 1,091 jobs in 238 businesses. In 2014 a total of 5.8% of the population received social assistance.

== Politics ==
In the 2015 federal election the most popular party was the CVP with 30.6% of the vote. The next three most popular parties were the SVP (20.9%), the FDP (20.5%) and the SP (11.3%). In the federal election, a total of 1,800 votes were cast, and the voter turnout was 60.7%.

== Crime ==
In 2014 the crime rate, of the over 200 crimes listed in the Swiss Criminal Code (running from murder, robbery and assault to accepting bribes and election fraud), in Sempach was 42.4 per thousand residents. This rate is only 73.5% of the cantonal rate and 65.6% of the average rate in the entire country. During the same period, the rate of drug crimes was 3.1 per thousand residents, which is about one-third the national rate. The rate of violations of immigration, visa and work permit laws was 0.5 per thousand residents, or about 10% of the national rate.

== Education ==
In Sempach about 81.3% of the population (between age 25-64) have completed either non-mandatory upper secondary education or additional higher education (either university or a Fachhochschule).

== Religion ==
In the 2000 census the religious membership of Sempach was as follows: 2,678 (76.9%) were Roman Catholic and 485 (13.9%) were Protestant, with an additional 22 (0.63%) that were of some other Christian faith. There were 86 individuals (2.47% of the population) who are Muslim. Of the rest, there were 15 (0.43%) individuals who belonged to another religion (not listed), 123 (3.53%) who did not belong to any organized religion, and 74 (2.12%) who did not answer the question.

== Weather ==
Sempach has an average of 133.9 days of rain per year and on average receives 1,114 mm (43.9 in) of precipitation. The wettest month is June during which time Sempach receives an average of 148 mm (5.8 in) of precipitation. During this month there is precipitation for an average of 13.2 days. The month with the most days of precipitation is May, with an average of 13.6, but with only 115 mm (4.5 in) of precipitation. The driest month of the year is October with an average of 66 mm (2.6 in) of precipitation over 13.2 days.
