= Ruswil =

- Municipality
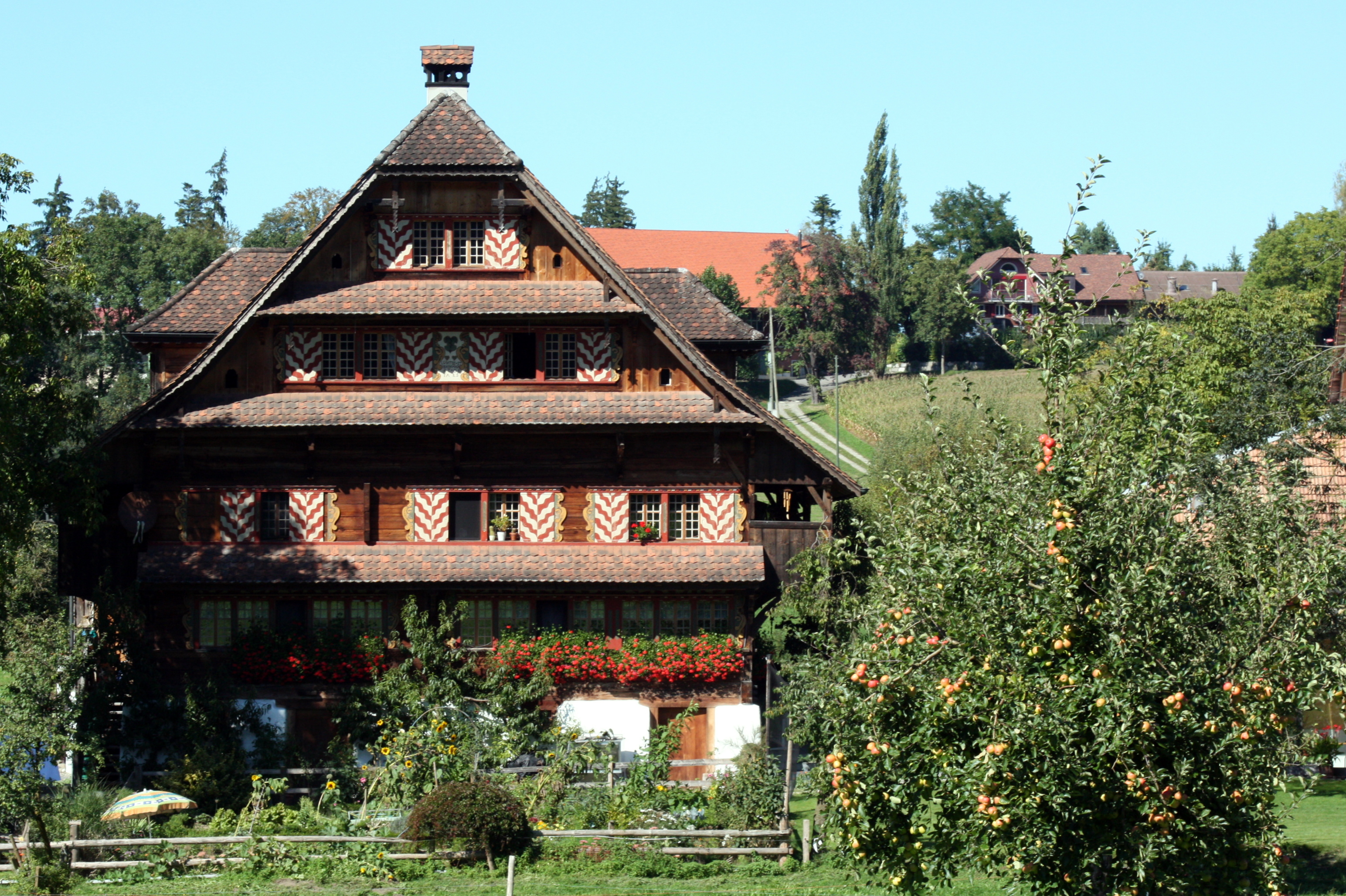

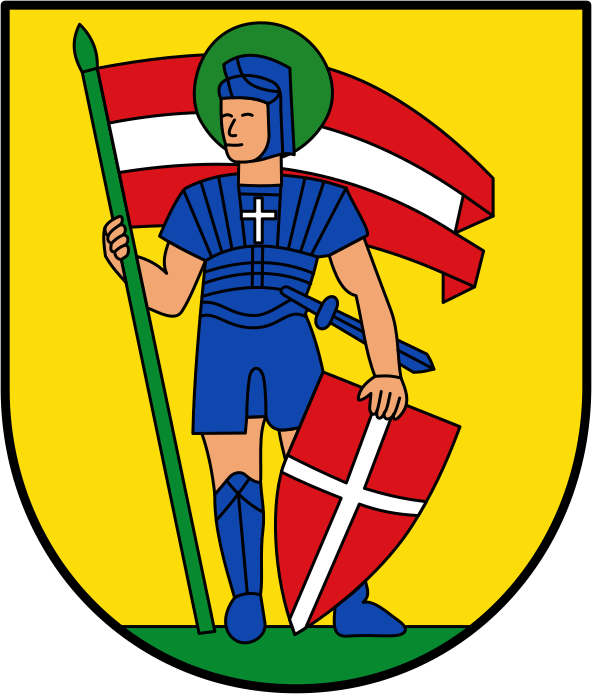
- Coat of arms
- Location of Ruswil
- Location within Switzerland Location within Canton of Lucerne
- Coordinates: 47°5′N 8°8′E
- Country: Switzerland
- Canton: Lucerne
- District: Sursee

Area
  - Total: 45.31 km^{2} (17.49 sq mi)
- Elevation: 634 m (2,080 ft)

Population (December 2020)
  - Total: 7,041
  - Density: 155.4/km^{2} (402.5/sq mi)
- Time zone: UTC+01:00 (CET)
  - Summer (DST): UTC+02:00 (CEST)
- Postal code: 6017,6019
- SFOS number: 1098
- ISO 3166 code: CH-LU
- Surrounded by: Buttisholz, Malters, Menznau, Neuenkirch, Nottwil, Werthenstein, Wolhusen
- Website: www.ruswil.ch

Ruswil is a municipality in the district of Sursee in the canton of Lucerne in Switzerland.

== Geography ==
Aerial view (1957)

Ruswil has an area of 45.3 km^{2} (17.5 sq mi). Of this area, 72.7% is used for agricultural purposes, while 20.9% is forested. Of the rest of the land, 6.2% is settled (buildings or roads) and the remainder (0.2%) is non-productive (rivers, glaciers or mountains). In the 1997 land survey, 20.94% of the total land area was forested. Of the agricultural land, 68.4% is used for farming or pastures, while 4.3% is used for orchards or vine crops. Of the settled areas, 3.18% is covered with buildings, 0.35% is industrial, 0.4% is classed as special developments, 0.13% is parks or greenbelts and 2.12% is transportation infrastructure. Of the unproductive areas, 0.15% is unproductive flowing water (rivers) and 0.02% is other unproductive land.

== Demographics ==
Ruswil has a population (as of 31 December 2020) of 7,041. As of 2007, 4.6% of the population was made up of foreign nationals. Over the last 10 years the population has grown at a rate of 2.8%. Most of the population (as of 2000) speaks German (95.8%), with Italian being second most common ( 0.7%) and Albanian being third ( 0.6%).

In the 2023 Swiss federal elections, the most popular party was the Centre (a merger of the former CVP and the Conservative Democratic Party) which received 39.7%, followed by the SVP (29.9%), FDP (11.5%), SPS (7.8%), Green Liberal Party (4.4%), Greens (4.3%) and others (2.3%).

In the 2007 Swiss federal election the most popular party was the CVP which received 42.5% of the vote. The next three most popular parties were the SVP (24.4%), the FDP (16.7%) and the SPS (7%).

The age distribution in Ruswil is; 1,690 people or 26.2% of the population is 0–19 years old. 1,726 people or 26.7% are 20–39 years old, and 2,169 people or 33.6% are 40–64 years old. The senior population distribution is 628 people or 9.7% are 65–79 years old, 200 or 3.1% are 80–89 years old and 47 people or 0.7% of the population are 90+ years old.

In Ruswil about 73% of the population (between age 25–64) have completed either non-mandatory upper secondary education or additional higher education (either university or a Fachhochschule).

As of 2000 there are 2,136 households, of which 529 households (or about 24.8%) contain only a single individual. 338 or about 15.8% are large households, with at least five members. As of 2000 there were 1,117 inhabited buildings in the municipality, of which 745 were built only as housing, and 372 were mixed use buildings. There were 465 single family homes, 152 double family homes, and 128 multi-family homes in the municipality. Most homes were either two (385) or three (252) story structures. There were only 35 single story buildings and 73 four or more story buildings.

Ruswil has an unemployment rate of 0.85%. As of 2005, there were 664 people employed in the primary economic sector and about 223 businesses involved in this sector. 691 people are employed in the secondary sector and there are 69 businesses in this sector. 901 people are employed in the tertiary sector, with 144 businesses in this sector. As of 2000 51.5% of the population of the municipality were employed in some capacity. At the same time, females made up 39.5% of the workforce.

In the 2000 census the religious membership of Ruswil was; 5,226 (83.5%) were Roman Catholic, and 475 (7.6%) were Protestant, with an additional 21 (0.34%) that were of some other Christian faith. There are 73 individuals (1.17% of the population) who are Muslim. Of the rest; there were 11 (0.18%) individuals who belong to another religion (not listed), 163 (2.6%) who do not belong to any organized religion, 293 (4.68%) who did not answer the question.
