= Knutwil =

- Municipality
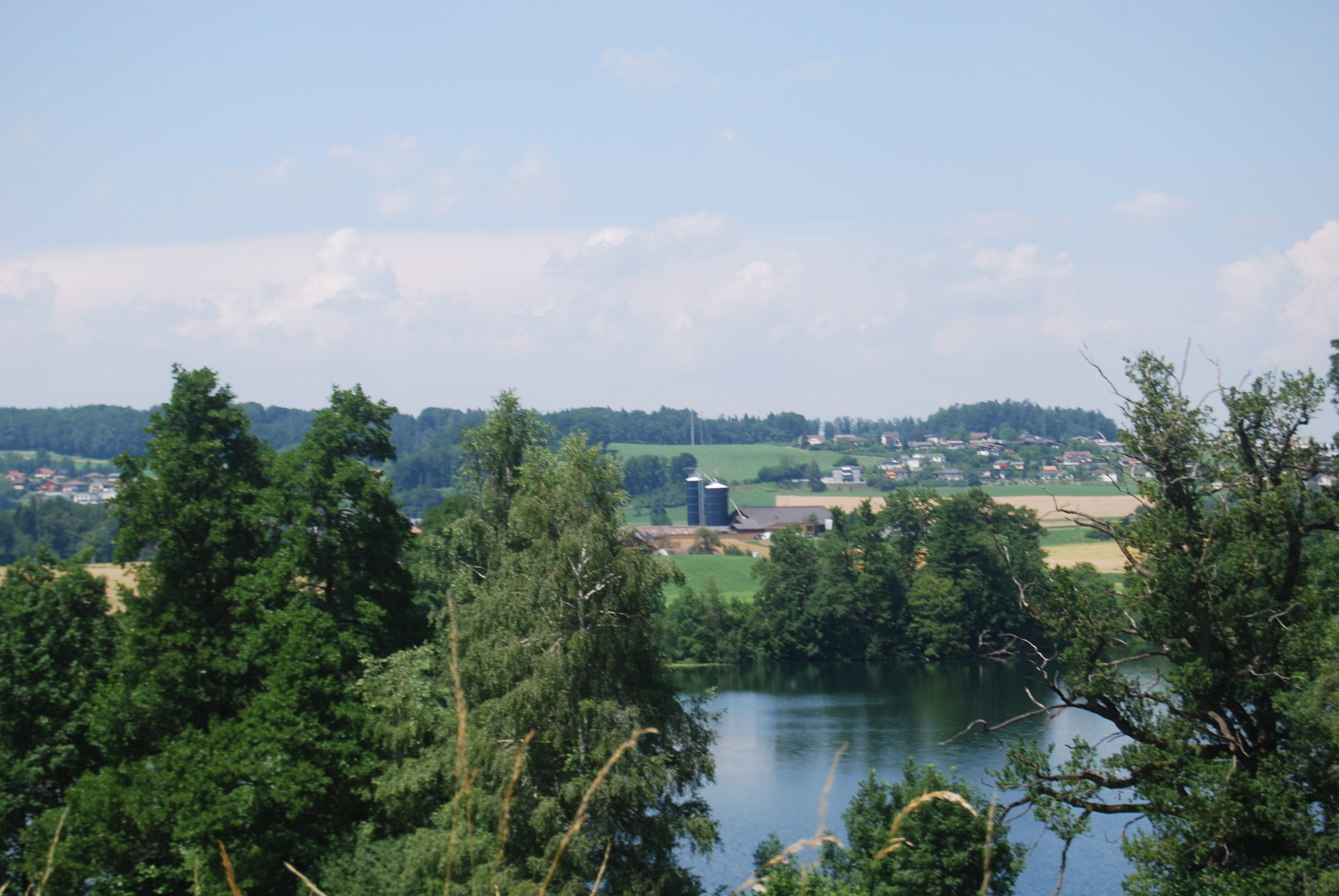

- Coat of arms
- Location of Knutwil
- Location within Switzerland Location within Canton of Lucerne
- Coordinates: 47°12′N 8°4′E
- Country: Switzerland
- Canton: Lucerne
- District: Sursee

Area
  - Total: 9.78 km^{2} (3.78 sq mi)
- Elevation: 541 m (1,775 ft)

Population (December 2020)
  - Total: 2,271
  - Density: 232/km^{2} (601/sq mi)
- Time zone: UTC+01:00 (CET)
  - Summer (DST): UTC+02:00 (CEST)
- Postal code: 6212-6213
- SFOS number: 1089
- ISO 3166 code: CH-LU
- Surrounded by: Büron, Dagmersellen, Geuensee, Mauensee, Sursee, Triengen, Winikon
- Website: www.knutwil.ch

Knutwil is a municipality in the district of Sursee in the canton of Lucerne in Switzerland.

== History ==
Knutwil is first mentioned in the early 12th Century as Gnuthwilare. In 1245 it was mentioned as Knutwile.

== Geography ==
Aerial view (1953)

Knutwil has an area of 9.8 km^{2} (3.8 sq mi). Of this area, 69% is used for agricultural purposes, while 20% is forested. Of the rest of the land, 10.7% is settled (buildings or roads) and the remainder (0.2%) is non-productive (rivers, glaciers or mountains). In the 1997 land survey, 20.04% of the total land area was forested. Of the agricultural land, 66.16% is used for farming or pastures, while 2.86% is used for orchards or vine crops. Of the settled areas, 4.81% is covered with buildings, 0.41% is industrial, 0.2% is parks or greenbelts and 5.32% is transportation infrastructure. Of the unproductive areas, 0.1% is unproductive flowing water (rivers) and 0.1% is other unproductive land.

The municipality is located on a line of hills on the south-west edge of the Surental. It consists of the village of Knutwil and the settlements of St. Erhard, Eriswil, Wolen, Schaubern and Hitzligen.

== Demographics ==
Knutwil has a population (as of 31 December 2020) of 2,271. As of 2007, 6.8% of the population was made up of foreign nationals. Over the last 10 years the population has grown at a rate of 7.9%. Most of the population (as of 2000) speaks German (97.2%), with Serbo-Croatian being second most common ( 0.9%) and French being third ( 0.4%).

In the 2007 election the most popular party was the CVP which received 36.5% of the vote. The next three most popular parties were the FDP (27.2%), the SVP (24%) and the Green Party (7.2%).

The age distribution in Knutwil is; 436 people or 25.7% of the population is 0–19 years old. 416 people or 24.5% are 20–39 years old, and 615 people or 36.2% are 40–64 years old. The senior population distribution is 185 people or 10.9% are 65–79 years old, 41 or 2.4% are 80–89 years old and 4 people or 0.2% of the population are 90+ years old.

The entire Swiss population is generally well educated. In Knutwil about 74% of the population (between age 25–64) have completed either non-mandatory upper secondary education or additional higher education (either university or a Fachhochschule).

As of 2000 there are 564 households, of which 129 households (or about 22.9%) contain only a single individual. 76 or about 13.5% are large households, with at least five members. As of 2000 there were 386 inhabited buildings in the municipality, of which 308 were built only as housing, and 78 were mixed use buildings. There were 230 single family homes, 49 double family homes, and 29 multi-family homes in the municipality. Most homes were either two (187) or three (79) story structures. There were only 28 single story buildings and 14 four or more story buildings.

Knutwil has an unemployment rate of 1.45%. As of 2005, there were 127 people employed in the primary economic sector and about 45 businesses involved in this sector. 175 people are employed in the secondary sector and there are 27 businesses in this sector. 282 people are employed in the tertiary sector, with 41 businesses in this sector. As of 2000 52.9% of the population of the municipality were employed in some capacity. At the same time, females made up 39.5% of the workforce.

In the 2000 census the religious membership of Knutwil was; 1,291 (81.6%) were Roman Catholic, and 139 (8.8%) were Protestant, with an additional 17 (1.07%) that were of some other Christian faith. There are 25 individuals (1.58% of the population) who are Muslim. Of the rest; there were 9 (0.57%) individuals who belong to another religion, 49 (3.1%) who do not belong to any organized religion, 53 (3.35%) who did not answer the question.

The historical population is given in the following table:

year	population
1574	304
1850	1,316
1900	933
1950	986
2000	1,583
