= Büron =

- Municipality
- Flag Coat of arms
- Location of Büron
- Location within Switzerland Location within Canton of Lucerne
- Coordinates: 47°13′N 8°6′E
- Country: Switzerland
- Canton: Lucerne
- District: Sursee

Area
  - Total: 5.37 km^{2} (2.07 sq mi)
- Elevation: 511 m (1,677 ft)

Population (December 2020)
  - Total: 2,662
  - Density: 496/km^{2} (1,280/sq mi)
- Time zone: UTC+01:00 (CET)
  - Summer (DST): UTC+02:00 (CEST)
- Postal code: 6233
- SFOS number: 1082
- ISO 3166 code: CH-LU
- Surrounded by: Geuensee, Knutwil, Schlierbach, Triengen
- Website: www.bueron.ch

Büron is a municipality in the district of Sursee in the canton of Lucerne in Switzerland.

== History ==
Büron is first mentioned in 1130 as Burron.

== Geography ==
Aerial view (1954)

Büron has an area of 5.4 km^{2} (2.1 sq mi). Of this area, 67% is used for agricultural purposes, while 16.5% is forested. Of the rest of the land, 15.6% is settled (buildings or roads) and the remainder (0.9%) is non-productive (rivers, glaciers or mountains). In the 1997 land survey, 16.51% of the total land area was forested. Of the agricultural land, 61.04% is used for farming or pastures, while 5.94% is used for orchards or vine crops. Of the settled areas, 7.79% is covered with buildings, 2.23% is industrial, 0.56% is classed as special developments, 0.56% is parks or greenbelts and 4.45% is transportation infrastructure. Of the unproductive areas, 0.74% is unproductive flowing water (rivers) and 0.19% is other unproductive land.

The municipality is located on the eastern foot of the Sursee valley.

== Demographics ==
Büron has a population (as of 31 December 2020) of 2,662. As of 2007, 21.2% of the population was made up of foreign nationals. Over the last 10 years the population has grown at a rate of 13.4%. Most of the population (as of 2000) speaks German (85.0%), with Albanian being second most common ( 4.3%) and Serbo-Croatian being third ( 3.4%).

In the 2007 election the most popular party was the FDP which received 34.9% of the vote. The next three most popular parties were the SVP (31.5%), the CVP (19.9%) and the Green Party (6.5%).

The age distribution in Büron is; 553 people or 26% of the population is 0–19 years old. 567 people or 26.7% are 20–39 years old, and 766 people or 36.1% are 40–64 years old. The senior population distribution is 178 people or 8.4% are 65–79 years old, 54 or 2.5% are 80–89 years old and 6 people or 0.3% of the population are 90+ years old.

The entire Swiss population is generally well educated. In Büron about 61.3% of the population (between age 25-64) have completed either non-mandatory upper secondary education or additional higher education (either university or a Fachhochschule).

As of 2000 there are 672 households, of which 169 households (or about 25.1%) contain only a single individual. 89 or about 13.2% are large households, with at least five members. As of 2000 there were 343 inhabited buildings in the municipality, of which 269 were built only as housing, and 74 were mixed use buildings. There were 190 single family homes, 39 double family homes, and 40 multi-family homes in the municipality. Most homes were either two (171) or three (65) story structures. There were only 9 single story buildings and 24 four or more story buildings.

Büron has an unemployment rate of 2.3%. As of 2005, there were 101 people employed in the primary economic sector and about 24 businesses involved in this sector. 512 people are employed in the secondary sector and there are 26 businesses in this sector. 179 people are employed in the tertiary sector, with 42 businesses in this sector. As of 2000 52.5% of the population of the municipality were employed in some capacity. At the same time, females made up 39.5% of the workforce.

In the 2000 census the religious membership of Büron was found to be as follows: 1,396 (73.7%) were Roman Catholic, and 173 (9.1%) were Protestant, with an additional 49 (2.59%) that were of some other Christian faith. There are 128 individuals (6.75% of the population) who are Muslim. Of the rest; there were 12 (0.63%) individuals who belong to another religion, 77 (4.06%) who do not belong to any organized religion, 60 (3.17%) who did not answer the question.

The historical population is given in the following table:

year	population
1631	632
1745	838
1798	1,128
1850	1,157
1900	926
1950	1,063
2000	1,895
