= Geuensee =

- Municipality
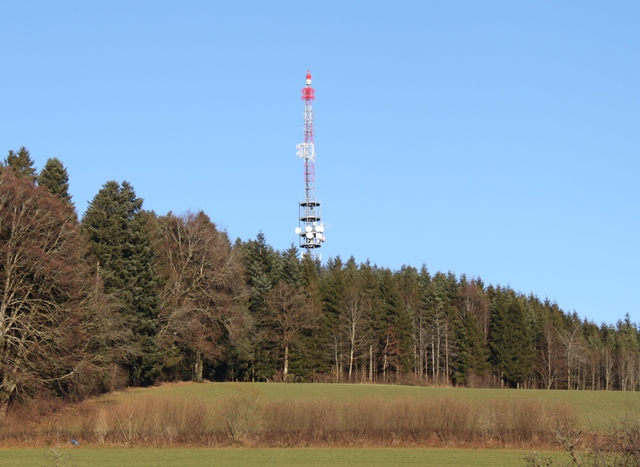

- Coat of arms
- Location of Geuensee
- Location within Switzerland Location within Canton of Lucerne
- Coordinates: 47°12′N 8°16′E
- Country: Switzerland
- Canton: Lucerne
- District: Sursee

Area
  - Total: 6.43 km^{2} (2.48 sq mi)
- Elevation: 507 m (1,663 ft)

Population (December 2020)
  - Total: 2,882
  - Density: 448/km^{2} (1,160/sq mi)
- Time zone: UTC+01:00 (CET)
  - Summer (DST): UTC+02:00 (CEST)
- Postal code: 6232
- SFOS number: 1085
- ISO 3166 code: CH-LU
- Surrounded by: Büron, Gunzwil, Knutwil, Rickenbach, Schenkon, Schlierbach, Sursee
- Website: www.geuensee.ch

Geuensee is a municipality in the district of Sursee in the canton of Lucerne in Switzerland.

== History ==
Geuensee is first mentioned around 1217-22 as de Geînwison.

== Geography ==
Aerial view (1954)

Geuensee has an area of 6.47 km^{2} (2.50 sq mi). Of this area, 70.9% is used for agricultural purposes, while 14.4% is forested. Of the rest of the land, 13.8% is settled (buildings or roads) and the remainder (0.3%) is non-productive (rivers, glaciers or mountains). In the 1997 land survey, 15.09% of the total land area was forested. Of the agricultural land, 69.83% is used for farming or pastures, while 4.67% is used for orchards or vine crops. Of the settled areas, 6.22% is covered with buildings, 0.47% is industrial, 0.62% is classed as special developments, 0.16% is parks or greenbelts and 2.8% is transportation infrastructure. All of the unproductive areas are classed as unproductive flowing water (rivers).

The municipality is located in the Suhrental. It consists of the village of Geuensee and the hamlets of Krummbach and Hunzikon.

== Demographics ==
Geuensee has a population (as of 31 December 2020) of 2,882. As of 2007, 23.8% of the population was made up of foreign nationals. Over the last 10 years the population has grown at a rate of 13.6%. Most of the population (as of 2000) speaks German (85.9%), with Albanian being second most common ( 5.7%) and Serbo-Croatian being third ( 2.7%).

In the 2007 election the most popular party was the CVP which received 30.8% of the vote. The next three most popular parties were the SVP (25.5%), the FDP (18.9%) and the Green Party (12.5%).

The age distribution in Geuensee is; 610 people or 26.6% of the population is 0–19 years old. 687 people or 30% are 20–39 years old, and 789 people or 34.4% are 40–64 years old. The senior population distribution is 161 people or 7% are 65–79 years old, 42 or 1.8% are 80–89 years old and 3 people or 0.1% of the population are 90+ years old.

The entire Swiss population is generally well educated. In Geuensee about 64.5% of the population (between age 25-64) have completed either non-mandatory upper secondary education or additional higher education (either university or a Fachhochschule).

As of 2000 there are 708 households, of which 198 households (or about 28.0%) contain only a single individual. 106 or about 15.% are large households, with at least five members. As of 2000 there were 343 inhabited buildings in the municipality, of which 264 were built only as housing, and 79 were mixed use buildings. There were 180 single family homes, 33 double family homes, and 51 multi-family homes in the municipality. Most homes were either two (128) or three (108) story structures. There were only 8 single story buildings and 20 four or more story buildings.

Geuensee has an unemployment rate of 3.02%. As of 2017, there were 84 people employed in the primary economic sector and about 29 businesses involved in this sector. 456 people are employed in the secondary sector and there are 39 businesses in this sector. 396 people are employed in the tertiary sector, with 100 businesses in this sector. As of 2000 53.6% of the population of the municipality were employed in some capacity. At the same time, females made up 42.3% of the workforce.

In the 2000 census the religious membership of Geuensee was; 1,340 (68.9%) were Roman Catholic, and 203 (10.4%) were Protestant, with an additional 91 (4.68%) that were of some other Christian faith. There are 152 individuals (7.81% of the population) who are Muslim. Of the rest; there were 12 (0.62%) individuals who belong to another religion, 72 (3.7%) who do not belong to any organized religion, 76 (3.91%) who did not answer the question.

The historical population is given in the following table:

year	population
1850	770
1900	517
1950	751
1980	1,202
2000	1,946
