= Steinibühlweiher =

Pond in Switzerland

- Location within Canton of Lucerne Location within Switzerland Location within Alps
- Interactive map of Steinibühlweiher
- Location: Sempach, Canton of Lucerne
- Coordinates: 47°8′15″N 8°12′32″E
- Type: reservoir
- Basin countries: Switzerland
- Surface area: 3 ha (7.4 acres)
- Surface elevation: 560 m (1,840 ft)

Steinibühlweiher is a pond at Sempach in the Canton of Lucerne, Switzerland, located near a forest. The artificial reservoir has a surface area of 3 ha. The pond has an elevation of 559 meters above the sea level. It is not known as to when the pond was constructed; however, there are a few documents indicating that this pond existed since the 14th century. The Sempach Corporation is responsible for its maintenance.
