= Hildisrieden =

- Municipality
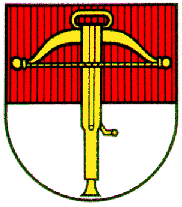
- Coat of arms
- Location of Hildisrieden
- Location within Switzerland Location within Canton of Lucerne
- Coordinates: 47°9′N 8°14′E
- Country: Switzerland
- Canton: Lucerne
- District: Sursee

Area
  - Total: 7.04 km^{2} (2.72 sq mi)
- Elevation: 685 m (2,247 ft)

Population (December 2020)
  - Total: 2,437
  - Density: 346/km^{2} (897/sq mi)
- Time zone: UTC+01:00 (CET)
  - Summer (DST): UTC+02:00 (CEST)
- Postal code: 6024
- SFOS number: 1088
- ISO 3166 code: CH-LU
- Surrounded by: Neudorf, Neuenkirch, Rain, Römerswil, Sempach
- Website: www.hildisrieden.ch

Hildisrieden is a municipality in the district of Sursee in the canton of Lucerne in Switzerland.

== History ==
Hildisrieden is first mentioned in 1173 as Hiltensrieden.

== Geography ==
Aerial view (1953)

Hildisrieden has an area of 7 km^{2} (2.7 sq mi). Of this area, 78% is used for agricultural purposes, while 11.9% is forested. The rest of the land, (10.2%) is settled. In the 1997 land survey, 11.87% of the total land area was forested. Of the agricultural land, 71.82% is used for farming or pastures, while 6.15% is used for orchards or vine crops. Of the settled areas, 5.87% is covered with buildings, 0.14% is industrial, 0.43% is parks or greenbelts and 3.72% is transportation infrastructure.

== Demographics ==
Hildisrieden has a population (as of 31 December 2020) of 2,437. As of 2007, 4.8% of the population was made up of foreign nationals. Over the last 10 years the population has grown at a rate of 3.9%. Most of the population (as of 2000) speaks German (95.8%), with Albanian being second most common ( 1.3%) and Italian being third ( 0.7%).

In the 2007 election the most popular party was the CVP which received 42% of the vote. The next three most popular parties were the SVP (25.3%), the FDP (20.3%) and the SPS (5.9%).

The age distribution in Hildisrieden is; 426 people or 23.5% of the population is 0–19 years old. 440 people or 24.3% are 20–39 years old, and 675 people or 37.3% are 40–64 years old. The senior population distribution is 187 people or 10.3% are 65–79 years old, 71 or 3.9% are 80–89 years old and 13 people or 0.7% of the population are 90+ years old.

The entire Swiss population is generally well educated. In Hildisrieden about 83.4% of the population (between age 25-64) have completed either non-mandatory upper secondary education or additional higher education (either university or a Fachhochschule).

As of 2000 there are 594 households, of which 120 households (or about 20.2%) contain only a single individual. 91 or about 15.3% are large households, with at least five members. As of 2000 there were 387 inhabited buildings in the municipality, of which 317 were built only as housing, and 70 were mixed use buildings. There were 256 single family homes, 39 double family homes, and 22 multi-family homes in the municipality. Most homes were either two (208) or three (69) story structures. There were only 30 single story buildings and 10 four or more story buildings.

Hildisrieden has an unemployment rate of 1.46%. As of 2005, there were 149 people employed in the primary economic sector and about 44 businesses involved in this sector. 95 people are employed in the secondary sector and there are 17 businesses in this sector. 233 people are employed in the tertiary sector, with 46 businesses in this sector. As of 2000 53.2% of the population of the municipality were employed in some capacity. At the same time, females made up 40.6% of the workforce.

In the 2000 census the religious membership of Hildisrieden was; 1,320 (78.8%) were Roman Catholic, and 182 (10.9%) were Protestant, with an additional 13 (0.78%) that were of some other Christian faith. There are 26 individuals (1.55% of the population) who are Muslim. Of the rest; there were 2 (0.12%) individuals who belong to another religion, 87 (5.19%) who do not belong to any organized religion, 45 (2.69%) who did not answer the question.

The historical population is given in the following table:

year	population
1798	560
1816	701
1850	666
1900	535
1950	793
1970	906
2000	1,675
