= Oberkirch, Switzerland =

Oberkirch
- Municipality
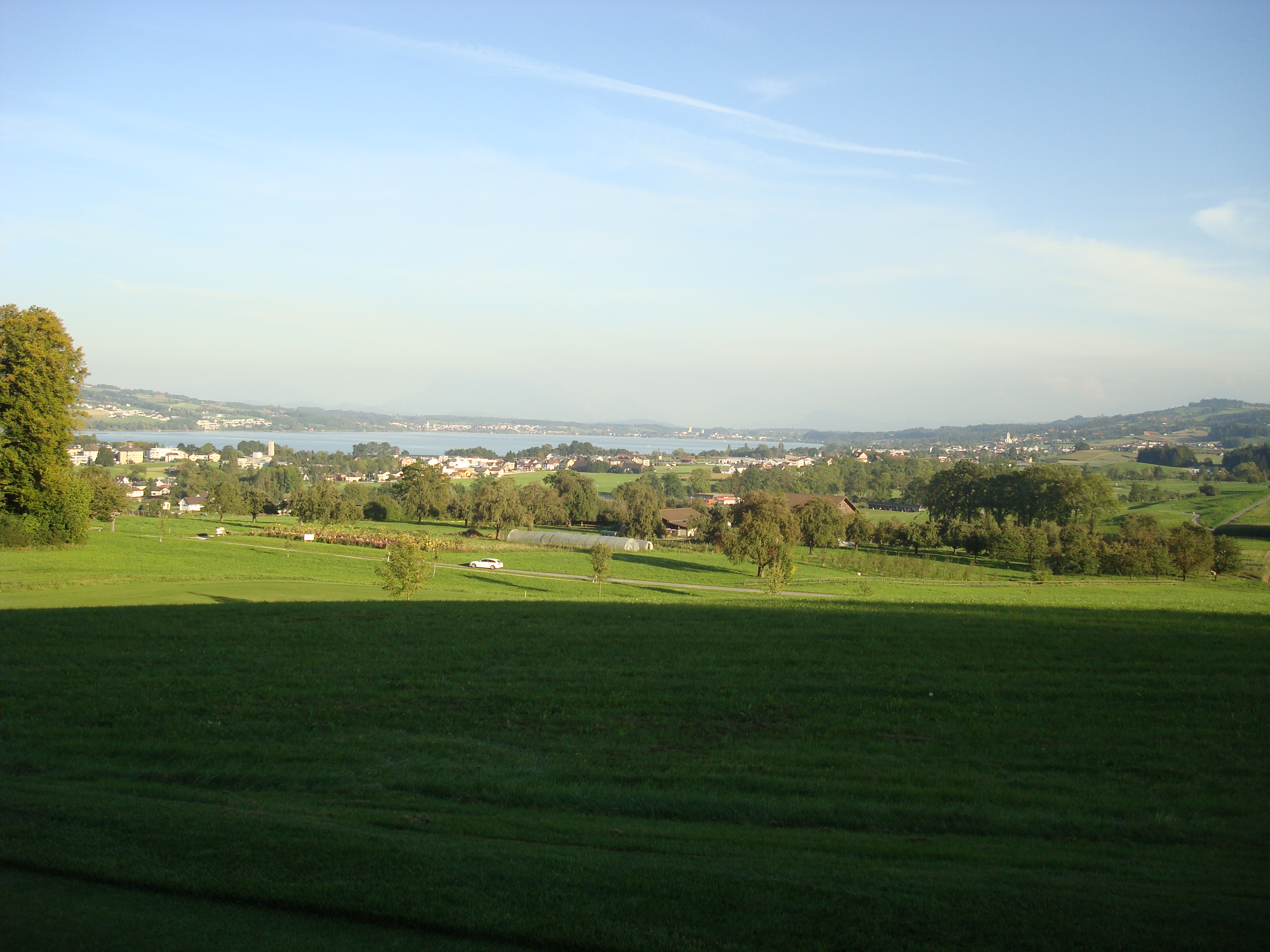

- Coat of arms
- Location of Oberkirch
- Location within Switzerland Location within Canton of Lucerne
- Coordinates: 47°9′N 8°7′E
- Country: Switzerland
- Canton: Lucerne
- District: Sursee

Area
  - Total: 9.11 km^{2} (3.52 sq mi)
- Elevation: 512 m (1,680 ft)

Population (December 2007)
  - Total: 3,317
  - Density: 364/km^{2} (943/sq mi)
- Time zone: UTC+01:00 (CET)
  - Summer (DST): UTC+02:00 (CEST)
- Postal code: 6208
- SFOS number: 1095
- ISO 3166 code: CH-LU
- Surrounded by: Buttisholz, Eich, Grosswangen, Mauensee, Nottwil, Schenkon, Sursee
- Website: www.oberkirch.ch

Oberkirch (Swiss Standard German pronunciation: [ˈoːbərkɪrç]) is a municipality in the district of Sursee in the canton of Lucerne in Switzerland.

== History ==
Oberkirch is first mentioned in 1036 as Ecclesia superior though this comes from a 14th Century copy of the earlier document. In 1052 it was mentioned as Obernkilch.

== Geography ==
Aerial view (1964)

Oberkirch has an area of 9.1 km^{2} (3.5 sq mi). Of this area, 74.2% is used for agricultural purposes, while 13.4% is forested. Of the rest of the land, 12.1% is settled (buildings or roads) and the remainder (0.3%) is non-productive (rivers, glaciers or mountains). In the 1997 land survey, 13.5% of the total land area was forested. Of the agricultural land, 64.98% is used for farming or pastures, while 9.11% is used for orchards or vine crops. Of the settled areas, 6.37% is covered with buildings, 0.99% is industrial, 0.44% is classed as special developments, 0.66% is parks or greenbelts and 3.62% is transportation infrastructure. Of the unproductive areas, and 0.33% is other unproductive land.

The municipality is located southwest of Lake Sempach (Sempachersee). It consists of the village of Oberkirch and the hamlets of Dogelzwil, Oberhof, Unterhof and Zellhüsli.

== Demographics ==
Oberkirch has a population (as of 2007) of 3,317, of which 10.3% are foreign nationals. Over the last 10 years the population has grown at a rate of 32.1%. Most of the population (as of 2000) speaks German (92.7%), with Serbo-Croatian being second most common ( 1.6%) and Albanian being third ( 1.4%).

In the 2007 election the most popular party was the CVP which received 31.4% of the vote. The next three most popular parties were the FDP (28.4%), the SVP (19.7%) and the Green Party (10.4%).

The age distribution in Oberkirch is; 855 people or 25% of the population is 0–19 years old. 1,071 people or 31.3% are 20–39 years old, and 1,139 people or 33.3% are 40–64 years old. The senior population distribution is 275 people or 8% are 65–79 years old, 68 or 2% are 80–89 years old and 14 people or 0.4% of the population are 90+ years old.

In Oberkirch about 76% of the population (between age 25-64) have completed either non-mandatory upper secondary education or additional higher education (either university or a Fachhochschule).

As of 2000 there are 991 households, of which 281 households (or about 28.4%) contain only a single individual. 117 or about 11.8% are large households, with at least five members. As of 2000 there were 469 inhabited buildings in the municipality, of which 375 were built only as housing, and 94 were mixed use buildings. There were 255 single family homes, 48 double family homes, and 72 multi-family homes in the municipality. Most homes were either two (196) or three (117) story structures. There were only 29 single story buildings and 33 four or more story buildings.

Oberkirch has an unemployment rate of 1.75%. As of 2005, there were 201 people employed in the primary economic sector and about 59 businesses involved in this sector. 502 people are employed in the secondary sector and there are 23 businesses in this sector. 581 people are employed in the tertiary sector, with 65 businesses in this sector. As of 2000 55.8% of the population of the municipality were employed in some capacity. At the same time, females made up 43% of the workforce.

In the 2000 census the religious membership of Oberkirch was; 2,186 (82.1%) were Roman Catholic, and 223 (8.4%) were Protestant, with an additional 60 (2.25%) that were of some other Christian faith. There are 42 individuals (1.58% of the population) who are Muslim. Of the rest; there were 5 (0.19%) individuals who belong to another religion (not listed), 74 (2.78%) who do not belong to any organized religion, 71 (2.67%) who did not answer the question.

The historical population is given in the following table:

| year | population |
|---|---|
| about 1695 | ca. 150 |
| 1850 | 1,141 |
| 1900 | 935 |
| 1950 | 1,166 |
| 2000 | 2,661 |
