= Neuenkirch =

- Municipality
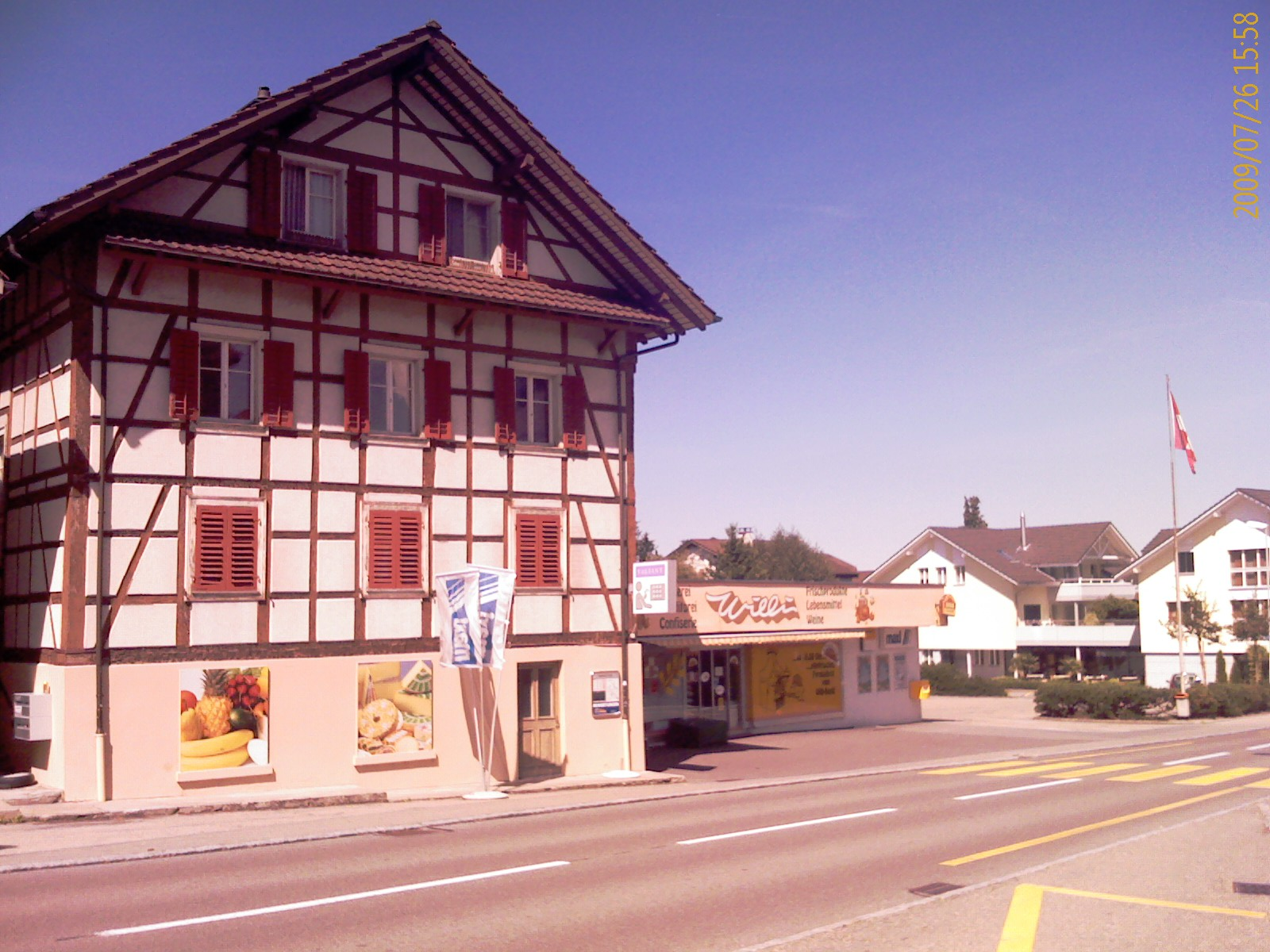

- Flag Coat of arms
- Location of Neuenkirch
- Location within Switzerland Location within Canton of Lucerne
- Coordinates: 47°6′N 8°12′E
- Country: Switzerland
- Canton: Lucerne
- District: Sursee

Area
  - Total: 26.25 km^{2} (10.14 sq mi)
- Elevation: 552 m (1,811 ft)

Population (December 2020)
  - Total: 7,174
  - Density: 273.3/km^{2} (707.8/sq mi)
- Time zone: UTC+01:00 (CET)
  - Summer (DST): UTC+02:00 (CEST)
- Postal code: 6016,6203,6206
- SFOS number: 1093
- ISO 3166 code: CH-LU
- Surrounded by: Emmen, Hildisrieden, Lucerne, Malters, Nottwil, Rain, Rothenburg, Ruswil, Sempach
- Website: www.neuenkirch.ch

Neuenkirch (Swiss Standard German pronunciation: [ˈnɔʏənkɪrç]) is a municipality in the district of Sursee in the canton of Lucerne in Switzerland.

== History ==
Neuenkirch is first mentioned in 1256 as nova ecclesia. In 1259 it was mentioned as Nuwenkilch.

== Geography ==
Aerial view (1957)

Neuenkirch has an area of 25.5 km^{2} (9.8 sq mi). Of this area, 71.2% is used for agricultural purposes, while 19.6% is forested. Of the rest of the land, 9.2% is settled (buildings or roads) and the remainder (0.1%) is non-productive (rivers, glaciers or mountains). In the 1997 land survey, 19.63% of the total land area was forested. Of the agricultural land, 67.65% is used for farming or pastures, while 3.49% is used for orchards or vine crops. Of the settled areas, 3.85% is covered with buildings, 0.47% is industrial, 0.51% is classed as special developments, 0.27% is parks or greenbelts and 4.04% is transportation infrastructure. Of the unproductive areas, 0.04% is unproductive flowing water (rivers) and 0.04% is other unproductive land.

The municipality is located on the upper end of Lake Sempach (Sempachersee). It consists of the village of Neuenkirch and the hamlets of Adelwil, Büezwil, Hälfestäge, Hellbühl, Homel, Lipperüti, Mättiwil, Rippertschwand, Rüeggringe, Trutige and Werlige as well as Schloss Wartensee.

== Demographics ==
Neuenkirch has a population (as of 31 December 2020) of 7,174. As of 2007, 8.2% of the population was made up of foreign nationals. Over the last 10 years the population has grown at a rate of 12.8%. Most of the population (as of 2000) speaks German (95.0%), with Albanian being second most common (1.5%) and Serbo-Croatian being third (1.0%).

In the 2007 election the most popular party was the CVP which received 30.9% of the vote. The next three most popular parties were the FDP (27.1%), the SVP (24.8%) and the SPS (8.6%).

The age distribution in Neuenkirch is; 1,622 people or 27.4% of the population is 0–19 years old. 1,594 people or 26.9% are 20–39 years old, and 2,081 people or 35.1% are 40–64 years old. The senior population distribution is 466 people or 7.9% are 65–79 years old, 128 or 2.2% are 80–89 years old and 35 people or 0.6% of the population are 90+ years old.

In Neuenkirch about 74.4% of the population (between age 25–64) have completed either non-mandatory upper secondary education or additional higher education (either university or a Fachhochschule).

As of 2000 there are 1,949 households, of which 458 households (or about 23.5%) contain only a single individual. 267 or about 13.7% are large households, with at least five members. As of 2000 there were 948 inhabited buildings in the municipality, of which 693 were built only as housing, and 255 were mixed use buildings. There were 464 single family homes, 109 double family homes, and 120 multi-family homes in the municipality. Most homes were either two (354) or three (219) story structures. There were only 39 single story buildings and 81 four or more story buildings.

Neuenkirch has an unemployment rate of 1.52%. As of 2005, there were 349 people employed in the primary economic sector and about 128 businesses involved in this sector. 700 people are employed in the secondary sector and there are 67 businesses in this sector. 1076 people are employed in the tertiary sector, with 157 businesses in this sector. As of 2000 53.7% of the population of the municipality were employed in some capacity. At the same time, females made up 41.8% of the workforce.

In the 2000 census the religious membership of Neuenkirch was; 4,353 (78.9%) were Roman Catholic, and 507 (9.2%) were Protestant, with an additional 74 (1.34%) that were of some other Christian faith. There are 174 individuals (3.15% of the population) who are Muslim. Of the rest; there were 15 (0.27%) individuals who belong to another religion, 257 (4.66%) who do not belong to any organized religion, 137 (2.48%) who did not answer the question.

The historical population is given in the following table:

| year | population |
|---|---|
| about 1695 | ca. 960 |
| 1850 | 2,413 |
| 1900 | 2,121 |
| 1950 | 2,856 |
| 2000 | 5,517 |
| 2018 | 7,062 |
| 2020 | 7,174 |

== Personalities ==
- Bernhard Berset, testpilot
- Heinrich Krauer (1755–1827), doctor and statesman
- Niklaus Wolf von Rippertschwand, statesman and healthcare
- Franz Xaver Schnyder von Wartensee (1786–1868), composer
