= Eich, Switzerland =

Eich
- Municipality
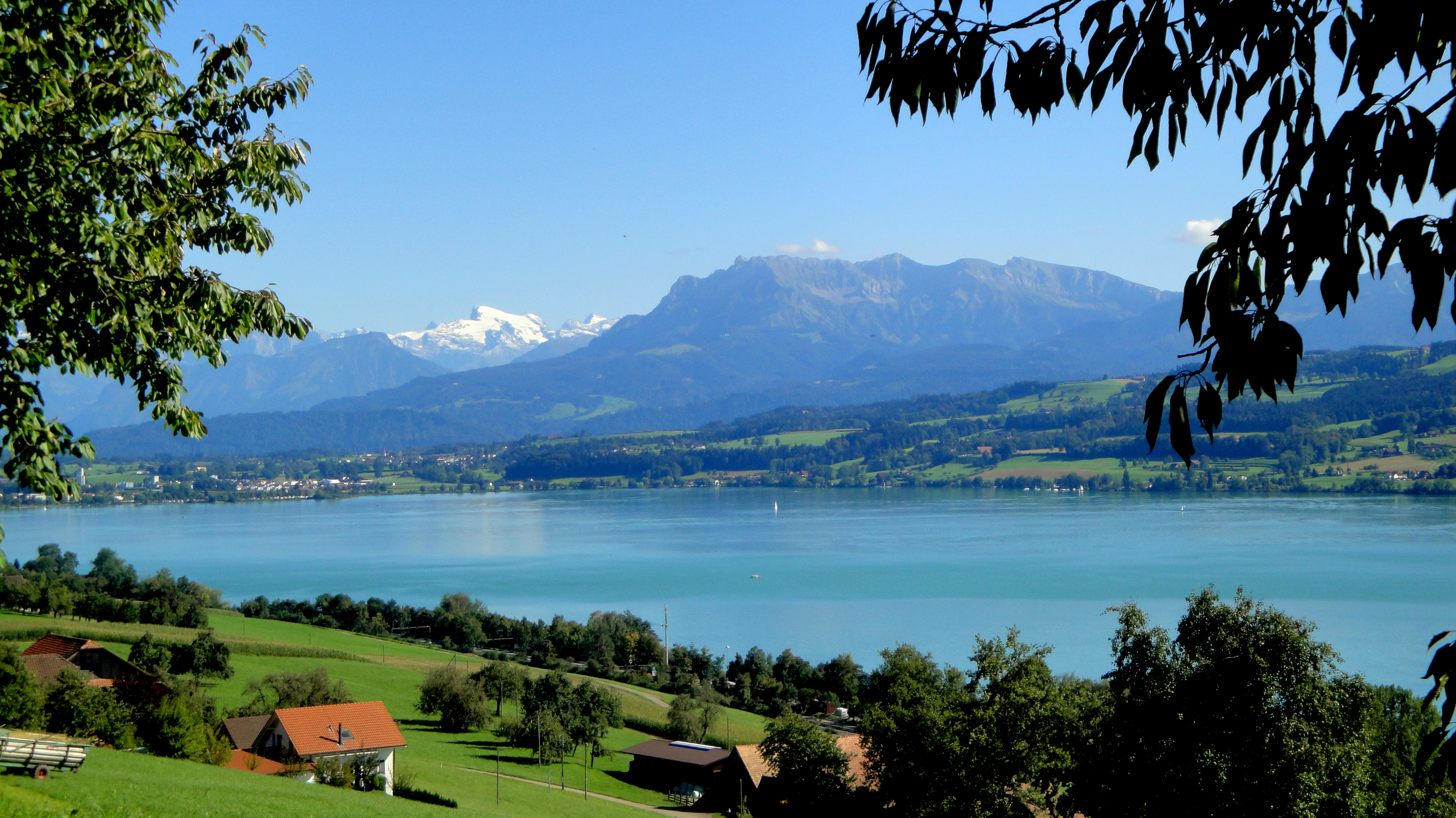

- Coat of arms
- Location of Eich
- Location within Switzerland Location within Canton of Lucerne
- Coordinates: 47°9′N 8°10′E
- Country: Switzerland
- Canton: Lucerne
- District: Sursee

Area
  - Total: 5.89 km^{2} (2.27 sq mi)
- Elevation: 516 m (1,693 ft)

Population (December 2007)
  - Total: 1,574
  - Density: 267/km^{2} (692/sq mi)
- Time zone: UTC+01:00 (CET)
  - Summer (DST): UTC+02:00 (CEST)
- Postal code: 6205
- SFOS number: 1084
- ISO 3166 code: CH-LU
- Surrounded by: Gunzwil, Neudorf, Nottwil, Oberkirch, Schenkon, Sempach
- Twin towns: Eich, Saxony (Germany)
- Website: www.eich.ch

Eich (German pronunciation: [aɪç]) is a municipality in the district of Sursee in the canton of Lucerne in Switzerland.

== History ==
Eich is first mentioned in 1045 as Heiche. In 1173 it was mentioned as Eiche.

== Geography ==
Aerial view (1964)

Eich has an area of 5.9 km^{2} (2.3 sq mi). Of this area, 67.9% is used for agricultural purposes, 12.6% is settled, and in the 1997 land survey, 19.52% of the area was forested. Of the agricultural land, 59.76% is used for farming or pastures, while 8.15% is used for orchards or vine crops. Of the settled areas, 5.26% is covered with buildings, 0.34% is classed as special developments, 0.68% is parks or greenbelts and 6.28% is transportation infrastructure. The municipality is located on the shores of the Sempach Laken. It consists of the village of Eich and the hamlet of östl.

== Demographics ==
Eich has a population (as of 2007) of 1,574, of whom 4.2% are foreign nationals. Over the last 10 years the population has grown at a rate of 37.1%. Most of the population (as of 2000) speaks German (97.7%), with French being second most common (0.5%) language and English being third (0.4%).

In the 2007 election the most popular party was the CVP which received 35.4% of the vote. The next three most popular parties were the SVP (26.2%), the FDP (26%) and the Green Party (6.4%).

The age distribution in Eich is: 366 people or 22.7% of the population is 0–19 years old. 414 people or 25.7% are 20–39 years old, and 664 people or 41.2% are 40–64 years old. The senior population distribution is 147 people or 9.1% are 65–79 years old, 18 or 1.1% are 80–89 years old and 4 people or 0.2% of the population are 90+ years old.

The entire Swiss population is generally well educated. In Eich about 85.4% of the population (between age 25-64) have completed either non-mandatory upper secondary education or additional higher education (either university or a Fachhochschule).

As of 2000 there are 447 households, of which 76 households (or about 17.0%) contain only a single individual. 52 or about 11.6% are large households, with at least five members. As of 2000 there were 297 inhabited buildings in the municipality, of which 235 were built only as housing, and 62 were mixed use buildings. There were 194 single family homes, 18 double family homes, and 23 multi-family homes in the municipality. Most homes were either two (141) or three (61) story structures. There were only 21 single story buildings and 12 four or more story buildings.

Eich has an unemployment rate of 1.4%. As of 2005, there were 90 people employed in the primary economic sector and about 29 businesses involved in this sector. 187 people are employed in the secondary sector and there are 18 businesses in this sector. 226 people are employed in the tertiary sector, with 48 businesses in this sector. As of 2000 55.9% of the population of the municipality were employed in some capacity. At the same time, females made up 43.4% of the workforce.

In the 2000 census the religious membership of Eich was; 945 (75.2%) were Roman Catholic, and 191 (15.2%) were Protestant, with an additional 11 (0.88%) that were of some other Christian faith. There are 6 individuals (0.48% of the population) who are Muslim. Of the rest; there were 2 (0.16%) individuals who belong to another religion, 79 (6.29%) who do not belong to any organized religion, 22 (1.75%) who did not answer the question.

The historical population is given in the following table:

year	population
1695	c330
1850	551
1900	434
1950	521
2000	1,256
