= Sursee District =

Coordinates: 47°10′N 8°6′E

Sursee District Wahlkreis Sursee
- District
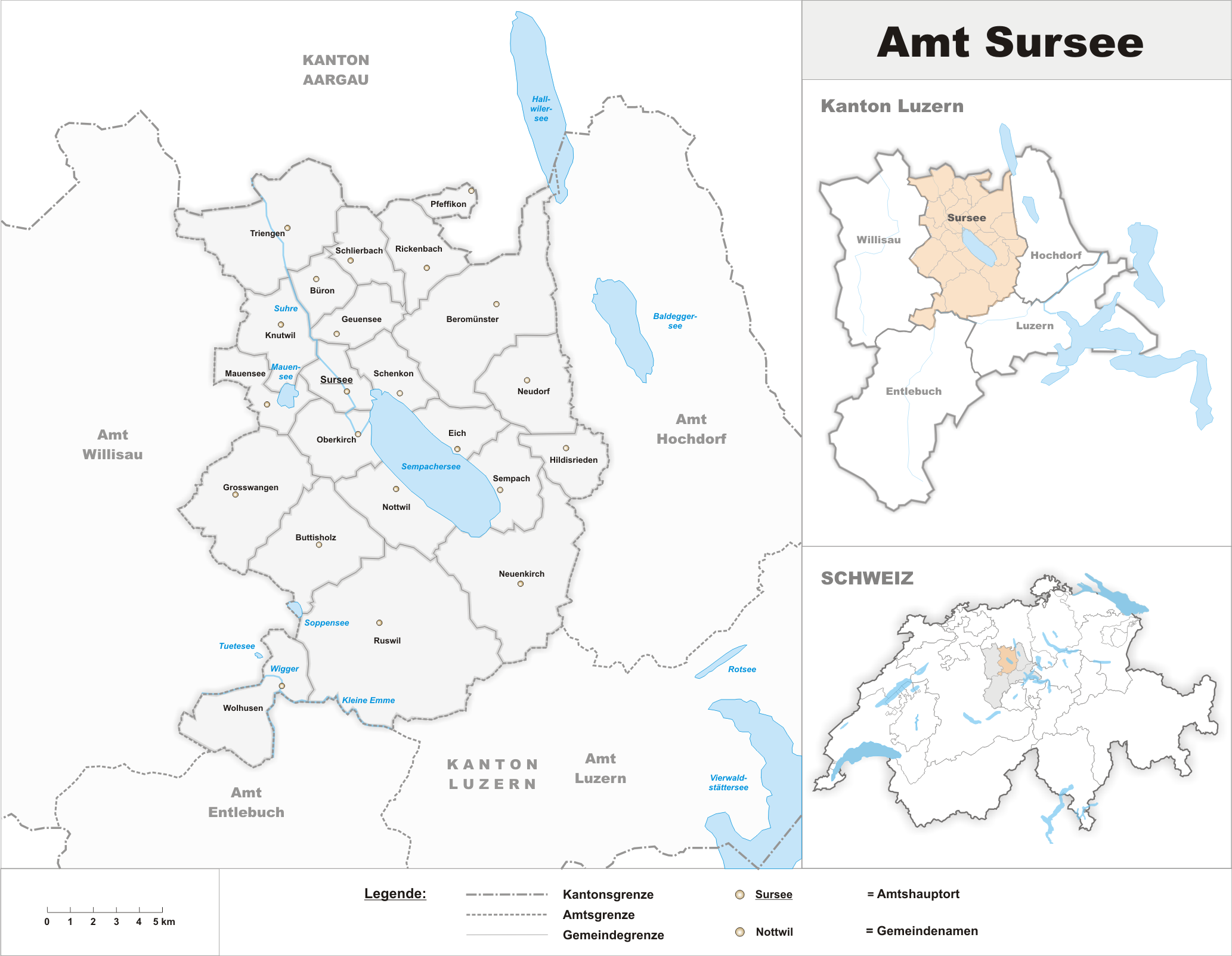
- Country: Switzerland
- Canton: Luzern
- Capital: Sursee

Area
  - Total: 287.74 km^{2} (111.10 sq mi)

Population (2020)
  - Total: 76,451
  - Density: 265.69/km^{2} (688.15/sq mi)
- Time zone: UTC+1 (CET)
  - Summer (DST): UTC+2 (CEST)
- Municipalities: 19

Sursee District is one of the five Ämtern, or districts, of the German-speaking Canton of Lucerne, Switzerland. Its capital is the town of Sursee. It has a population of 76,451 (as of 31 December 2020). In 2013 the name was changed from Amt Sursee to Wahlkreis Sursee as part of a reorganization of the Canton. A sixth Wahlkreis was created, but in Sursee everything else remained essentially unchanged.

Sursee District consists of the following municipalities:

Municipality	Population (31 December 2020)	Area, km^{2}
Beromünster	6,661	42.12
Büron	2,662	5.37
Buttisholz	3,322	16.71
Eich	1,600	9.22
Geuensee	2,882	6.47
Grosswangen	3,293	19.70
Hildisrieden	2,437	7.04
Knutwil	2,271	9.74
Mauensee	1,489	45.10
Neuenkirch	7,174	26.25
Nottwil	4,048	14.83
Oberkirch	4,937	9.10
Rickenbach	3,458	11.85
Ruswil	7,041	45.3
Schenkon	3,040	6.8
Schlierbach	925	7.2
Sempach	4,234	8.95
Sursee	10,361	5.9
Triengen	4,616	22.08
Total	72,373	287.74^{a}

^a 1992/97 survey gives a total area of 287.50 km^{2} (111.00 sq mi) without including certain large lakes, while the 2000 survey includes lakes and gives the higher value.

== Mergers and name changes ==
- On 1 September 2004 the former municipality of Schwarzenbach merged into the municipality of Beromünster.
- On 1 January 2009 the former municipality of Gunzwil merged into the municipality of Beromünster.
- On 1 January 2013 the former municipality of Neudorf merged into the municipality of Beromünster and the former municipality of Pfeffikon merged into the municipality of Rickenbach. The municipality of Wolhusen moved from the Sursee District to the Entlebuch District.
