= Schenkon =

- Municipality
- Coat of arms
- Location of Schenkon
- Location within Switzerland Location within Canton of Lucerne
- Coordinates: 47°10′N 8°8′E
- Country: Switzerland
- Canton: Lucerne
- District: Sursee

Area
  - Total: 6.76 km^{2} (2.61 sq mi)
- Elevation: 522 m (1,713 ft)

Population (December 2020)
  - Total: 3,040
  - Density: 450/km^{2} (1,160/sq mi)
- Time zone: UTC+01:00 (CET)
  - Summer (DST): UTC+02:00 (CEST)
- Postal code: 6214
- SFOS number: 1099
- ISO 3166 code: CH-LU
- Surrounded by: Eich, Geuensee, Gunzwil, Oberkirch, Sursee
- Twin towns: Schenkenzell (Germany)
- Website: www.schenkon.ch

Schenkon is a municipality in the district of Sursee in the canton of Lucerne in Switzerland.

== Geography ==
Schenkon has an area of 6.8 km^{2} (2.6 sq mi). Of this area, 67.8% is used for agricultural purposes, while 17% is forested. Of the rest of the land, 14.8% is settled (buildings or roads) and the remainder (0.4%) is non-productive (rivers, glaciers or mountains). In the 1997 land survey, 17.01% of the total land area was forested. Of the agricultural land, 61.39% is used for farming or pastures, while 6.51% is used for orchards or vine crops. Of the settled areas, 7.84% is covered with buildings, 0.74% is industrial, 0.59% is classed as special developments, 0.44% is parks or greenbelts and 5.18% is transportation infrastructure. Of the unproductive areas, 0.15% is unproductive flowing water (rivers) and 0.15% is other unproductive land.

== Demographics ==
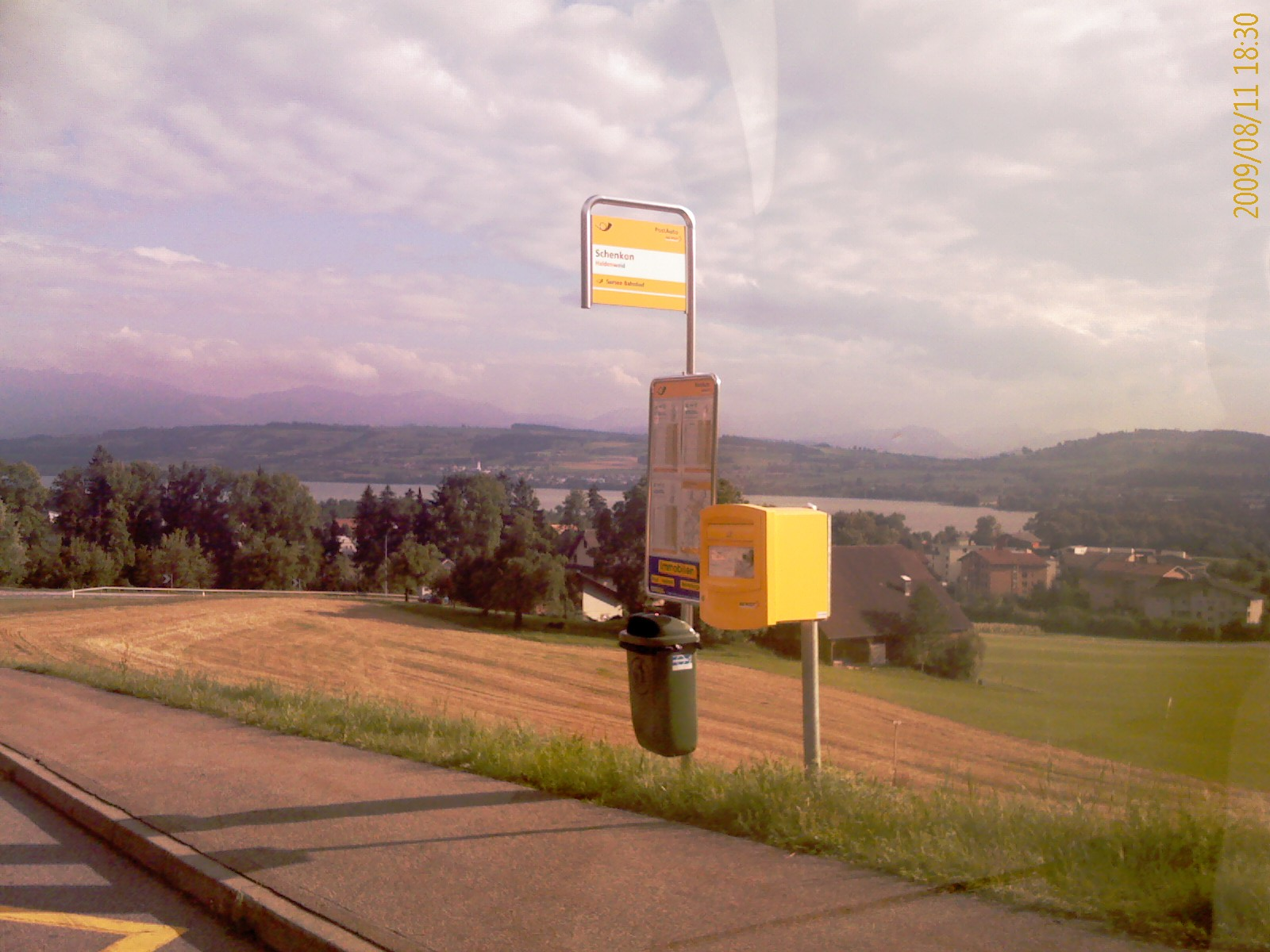
View from Schenkon bus stop over the village and Lake Sempach.

Schenkon has a population (as of 31 December 2020) of 3,040. As of 2007, 4.2% of the population was made up of foreign nationals. Over the last 10 years the population has grown at a rate of 26.9%. Most of the population (as of 2000) speaks German (96.4%), with Italian being second most common ( 0.6%) and Serbo-Croatian being third ( 0.4%).

In the 2007 election the most popular party was the CVP which received 30.8% of the vote. The next three most popular parties were the SVP (29.2%), the FDP (26.5%) and the Green Party (6.6%).

The age distribution in Schenkon is; 603 people or 23.6% of the population is 0–19 years old. 743 people or 29.1% are 20–39 years old, and 973 people or 38.1% are 40–64 years old. The senior population distribution is 203 people or 8% are 65–79 years old, 26 or 1% are 80–89 years old and 4 people or 0.2% of the population are 90+ years old.

In Schenkon about 81.7% of the population (between age 25-64) have completed either non-mandatory upper secondary education or additional higher education (either university or a Fachhochschule).

As of 2000 there are 766 households, of which 160 households (or about 20.9%) contain only a single individual. 84 or about 11.0% are large households, with at least five members. As of 2000 there were 423 inhabited buildings in the municipality, of which 361 were built only as housing, and 62 were mixed use buildings. There were 280 single family homes, 33 double family homes, and 48 multi-family homes in the municipality. Most homes were either two (183) or three (112) story structures. There were only 40 single story buildings and 26 four or more story buildings.

Schenkon has an unemployment rate of 1.16%. As of 2005, there were 103 people employed in the primary economic sector and about 37 businesses involved in this sector. 198 people are employed in the secondary sector and there are 24 businesses in this sector. 348 people are employed in the tertiary sector, with 55 businesses in this sector. As of 2000 58.9% of the population of the municipality were employed in some capacity. At the same time, females made up 42.5% of the workforce.

In the 2000 census the religious membership of Schenkon was; 1,703 (80.9%) were Roman Catholic, and 230 (10.9%) were Protestant, with an additional 10 (0.48%) that were of some other Christian faith. There are 8 individuals (0.38% of the population) who are Muslim. Of the rest; there were 5 (0.24%) individuals who belong to another religion (not listed), 97 (4.61%) who do not belong to any organized religion, 51 (2.42%) who did not answer the question.
