= Gunzwil =

- Former municipality
- Flag Coat of arms
- Location of Gunzwil
- Location within Switzerland Location within Canton of Lucerne
- Coordinates: 47°13′N 8°11′E
- Country: Switzerland
- Canton: Lucerne
- District: Sursee

Area
  - Total: 23.17 km^{2} (8.95 sq mi)
- Elevation: 665 m (2,182 ft)

Population (December 2007)
  - Total: 1,875
  - Density: 80.92/km^{2} (209.6/sq mi)
- Time zone: UTC+01:00 (CET)
  - Summer (DST): UTC+02:00 (CEST)
- Postal code: 6222
- SFOS number: 1087
- ISO 3166 code: CH-LU
- Surrounded by: Beromünster, Eich, Ermensee, Geuensee, Menziken (AG), Neudorf, Rickenbach, Römerswil, Schenkon
- Website: www.gunzwil.ch

Gunzwil was a municipality within the district of Sursee, in the canton of Lucerne, Switzerland. On 1 January 2009 it merged with the municipality of Beromünster, becoming a village inside the new municipality of Beromünster.

== History ==
Gunzwil was first mentioned in 1036 as Gunczwilare, though the only existing document that mentions this is a 14th Century copy. In 1173 it was mentioned as in Gunzewile.

== Geography ==
Aerial view (1964)

Gunzwil has an area of 23.2 km^{2} (9.0 sq mi). Of this area, 78.5% was used for agricultural purposes, while 15% was forested. Of the rest of the land, 6.3% was settled (buildings or roads) and the remainder (0.1%) was non-productive (rivers, glaciers or mountains).

The municipality was located between the Suren- and Seetal valleys. It consisted of the village of Gunzwil and numerous hamlets. Since 1 January 2009 it has been part of Beromünster. The merged municipality has an area of 29.35 km^{2} (11.33 sq mi) and a population of 4,588 of which 10.1% are foreign.

== Demographics ==
Gunzwil had a population (as of 2007) of 1,875, of which 5.6% were foreign nationals. Over the last 10 years, the population has decreased at a rate of -1.5%. Most of the population (as of 2000) spoke German (94.9%), with Albanian second most common (2.2%), and Italian third (0.5%).

In the 2007 election, the most popular party was the CVP, which received 41.9% of the vote. The next three most popular parties were the SVP (30.4%), the FDP (16.5%) and the Green Party (5.5%).

The age distribution of the population (as of 2000) was: children and teenagers (0–19 years old) make up 30% of the population, while adults (20–64 years old) make up 59%, and seniors (over 64 years old) make up 11%. The entire Swiss population is generally well educated. In Gunzwil, about 71.3% of the population (between the ages of 25 and 64) had completed either non-mandatory upper secondary education or additional higher education (either University or a Fachhochschule).

As of 2005, there were 339 people employed in the primary economic sector, and about 112 businesses involved in this sector. 169 people are employed in the secondary sector and there are 26 businesses in this sector. 228 people are employed in the tertiary sector, with 42 businesses in this sector. Gunzwil had an unemployment rate of 0.86%.

The historical population is given in the following table:

year	population
1456	c. 335
around 1695	c. 894
1798	1,181
1816	1,619
1850	1,806
1900	1,439
1950	1,583
2000	1,857
