= Rickenbach, Lucerne =

Rickenbach
- Municipality

- Flag Coat of arms
- Location of Rickenbach
- Location within Switzerland Location within Canton of Lucerne
- Coordinates: 47°13′N 8°9′E
- Country: Switzerland
- Canton: Lucerne
- District: Sursee

Area
  - Total: 9.36 km^{2} (3.61 sq mi)
- Elevation: 695 m (2,280 ft)

Population (December 2020)
  - Total: 3,458
  - Density: 369/km^{2} (957/sq mi)
- Time zone: UTC+01:00 (CET)
  - Summer (DST): UTC+02:00 (CEST)
- Postal code: 6221
- SFOS number: 1097
- ISO 3166 code: CH-LU
- Surrounded by: Burg (AG), Geuensee, Gontenschwil (AG), Gunzwil, Menziken (AG), Pfeffikon, Reinach (AG), Schlierbach, Schmiedrued (AG)
- Website: www.rickenbach.ch

Rickenbach (Swiss Standard German pronunciation: [ˈrɪkn̩bax]) is a municipality in the district of Sursee in the canton of Lucerne in Switzerland. On 1 January 2013 the former municipality of Pfeffikon merged into the municipality of Rickenbach.

== Geography ==
Aerial view (1964)

Rickenbach has an area of 11.85 km^{2} (4.58 sq mi). Of this area, 62.7% is used for agricultural purposes, while 26.3% is forested. The rest of the land, (11%) is settled. In the 1997 land survey, 26.28% of the total land area was forested. Of the agricultural land, 58.33% is used for farming or pastures, while 4.38% is used for orchards or vine crops. Of the settled areas, 4.91% is covered with buildings, 2.03% is industrial, 0.43% is classed as special developments, 0.11% is parks or greenbelts and 3.53% is transportation infrastructure.

== Demographics ==
Rickenbach has a population (as of 31 December 2020) of 3,458. As of 2007, 13.3% of the population was made up of foreign nationals. Over the last 10 years the population has grown at a rate of 8.7%. Most of the population (as of 2000) speaks German (92.3%), with Albanian being second most common (3.5%) and Portuguese being third (1.4%).

In the 2007 election the most popular party was the CVP which received 40.9% of the vote. The next three most popular parties were the SVP (28.7%), the FDP (24.1%) and the SPS (3.2%).

The age distribution in Rickenbach is; 642 people or 28.9% of the population is 0–19 years old. 568 people or 25.6% are 20–39 years old, and 722 people or 32.6% are 40–64 years old. The senior population distribution is 213 people or 9.6% are 65–79 years old, 59 or 2.7% are 80–89 years old and 14 people or 0.6% of the population are 90+ years old.

In Rickenbach about 69.9% of the population (between age 25-64) have completed either non-mandatory upper secondary education or additional higher education (either university or a Fachhochschule).

As of 2000 there are 682 households, of which 144 households (or about 21.1%) contain only a single individual. 116 or about 17.0% are large households, with at least five members. As of 2000 there were 384 inhabited buildings in the municipality, of which 301 were built only as housing, and 83 were mixed use buildings. There were 222 single family homes, 35 double family homes, and 44 multi-family homes in the municipality. Most homes were either two (172) or three (85) story structures. There were only 20 single story buildings and 24 four or more story buildings.

Rickenbach has an unemployment rate of 1.77%. As of 2005, there were 113 people employed in the primary economic sector and about 41 businesses involved in this sector. 295 people are employed in the secondary sector and there are 41 businesses in this sector. 246 people are employed in the tertiary sector, with 50 businesses in this sector. As of 2000 52.1% of the population of the municipality were employed in some capacity. At the same time, females made up 40.6% of the workforce.

In the 2000 census the religious membership of Rickenbach was; 1,529 (75.8%) were Roman Catholic, and 198 (9.8%) were Protestant, with an additional 20 (0.99%) that were of some other Christian faith. There are 4 individuals (0.2% of the population) who are Jewish. There are 135 individuals (6.69% of the population) who are Muslim. Of the rest; there were 4 (0.2%) individuals who belong to another religion (not listed), 55 (2.73%) who do not belong to any organized religion, 72 (3.57%) who did not answer the question.
