= Grosswangen =

- Municipality
- Coat of arms
- Location of Grosswangen
- Location within Switzerland Location within Canton of Lucerne
- Coordinates: 47°8′N 8°3′E
- Country: Switzerland
- Canton: Lucerne
- District: Sursee

Area
  - Total: 19.70 km^{2} (7.61 sq mi)
- Elevation: 585 m (1,919 ft)

Population (December 2020)
  - Total: 3,293
  - Density: 167.2/km^{2} (432.9/sq mi)
- Time zone: UTC+01:00 (CET)
  - Summer (DST): UTC+02:00 (CEST)
- Postal code: 6022
- SFOS number: 1086
- ISO 3166 code: CH-LU
- Surrounded by: Buttisholz, Ettiswil, Mauensee, Menznau, Oberkirch, Willisau
- Website: www.grosswangen.ch

Grosswangen is a municipality in the district of Sursee in the canton of Lucerne in Switzerland.

== History ==
Grosswangen is first mentioned in 893 as Wanga.

== Geography ==
Aerial view (1946)

Grosswangen has an area of 19.7 km^{2} (7.6 sq mi). Of this area, 78.3% is used for agricultural purposes, while 15.3% is forested. Of the rest of the land, 5.9% is settled (buildings or roads) and the remainder (0.5%) is non-productive (rivers, glaciers or mountains). In the 1997 land survey, 15.34% of the total land area was forested. Of the agricultural land, 71.86% is used for farming or pastures, while 6.4% is used for orchards or vine crops. Of the settled areas, 3.56% is covered with buildings, 0.3% is industrial, 0.2% is classed as special developments, 0.15% is parks or greenbelts and 1.73% is transportation infrastructure. Of the unproductive areas, 0.3% is unproductive flowing water (rivers) and 0.15% is other unproductive land.

The municipality is located in the lower Rottal. It consists of the sections of Innerdorf, Oberdorf, Roth, Sigerswil and Stettenbach.

== Demographics ==
Grosswangen has a population (as of 31 December 2020) of 3,293. As of 2007, 11.1% of the population was made up of foreign nationals. Over the last 10 years the population has grown at a rate of 8.2%. Most of the population (as of 2000) speaks German (93.6%), with Albanian being second most common (3.9%) and Portuguese being third (0.5%).

In the 2007 election the most popular party was the CVP which received 38% of the vote. The next three most popular parties were the FDP (29.1%), the SVP (24.6%) and the Green Party (4.1%).

The age distribution in Grosswangen is; 806 people or 27.8% of the population is 0–19 years old. 793 people or 27.4% are 20–39 years old, and 952 people or 32.9% are 40–64 years old. The senior population distribution is 235 people or 8.1% are 65–79 years old, 99 or 3.4% are 80–89 years old and 11 people or 0.4% of the population are 90+ years old.

The entire Swiss population is generally well educated. In Grosswangen about 70.7% of the population (between age 25-64) have completed either non-mandatory upper secondary education or additional higher education (either university or a Fachhochschule).

As of 2000 there are 905 households, of which 217 households (or about 24.0%) contain only a single individual. 181 or about 20.0% are large households, with at least five members. As of 2000 there were 531 inhabited buildings in the municipality, of which 328 were built only as housing, and 203 were mixed use buildings. There were 222 single family homes, 63 double family homes, and 43 multi-family homes in the municipality. Most homes were either two (197) or three (91) story structures. There were only 23 single story buildings and 17 four or more story buildings.

Grosswangen has an unemployment rate of 1.16%. As of 2005, there were 359 people employed in the primary economic sector and about 124 businesses involved in this sector. 331 people are employed in the secondary sector and there are 42 businesses in this sector. 382 people are employed in the tertiary sector, with 61 businesses in this sector. As of 2000 50.9% of the population of the municipality were employed in some capacity. At the same time, females made up 40% of the workforce.

In the 2000 census the religious membership of Grosswangen was; 2,358 (86.3%) were Roman Catholic, and 130 (4.8%) were Protestant, with an additional 18 (0.66%) that were of some other Christian faith. There are 86 individuals (3.15% of the population) who are Muslim. Of the rest; there were 6 (0.22%) individuals who belong to another religion, 62 (2.27%) who do not belong to any organized religion, 71 (2.6%) who did not answer the question.

The historical population is given in the following table:

year	population
1745	1,540
1810	1,842
1850	2,724
1900	2,035
1950	2,436
1970	2,213
2000	2,713

== Pictures ==
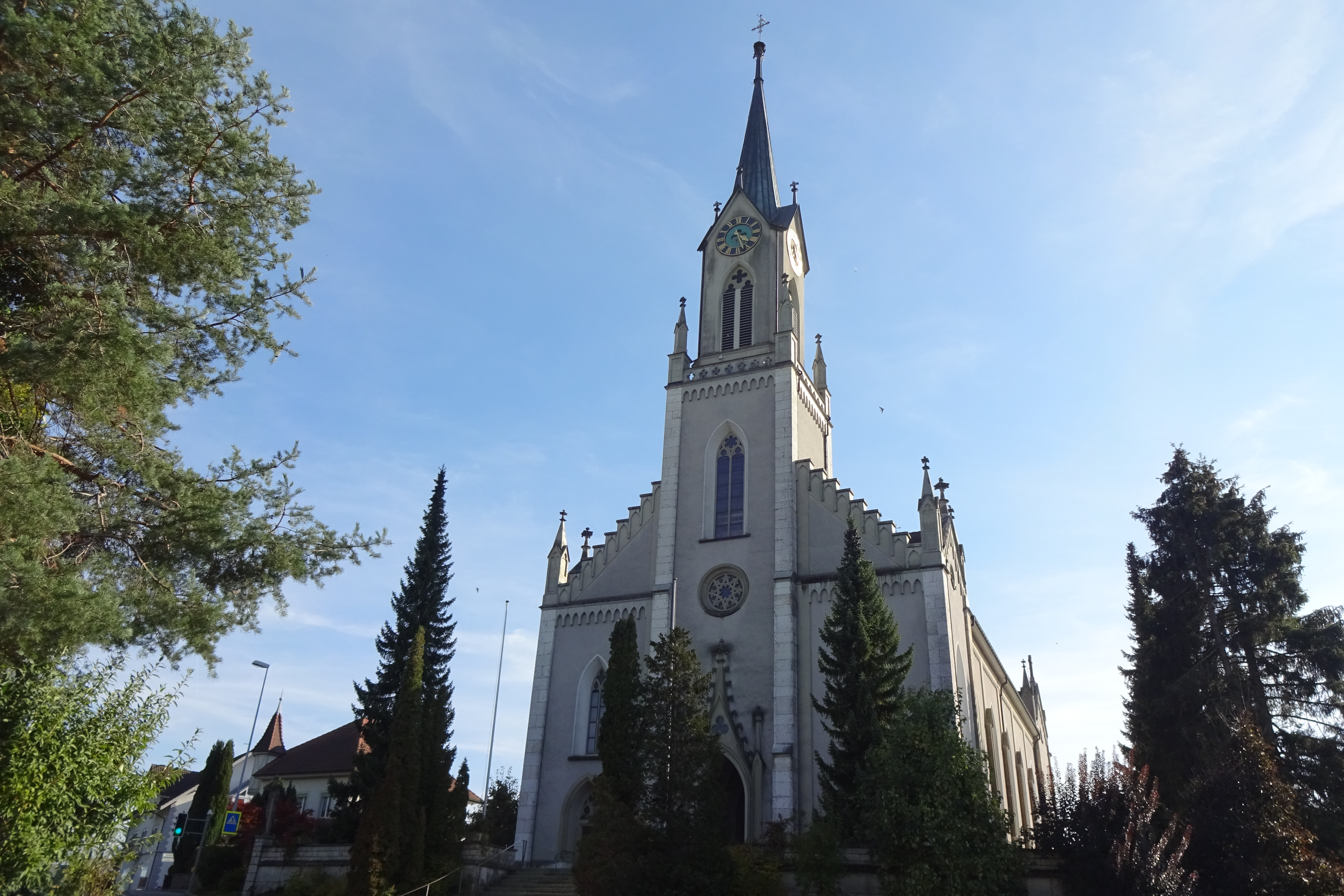
Catholic Church of Saint Conrad - north façade (main façade)

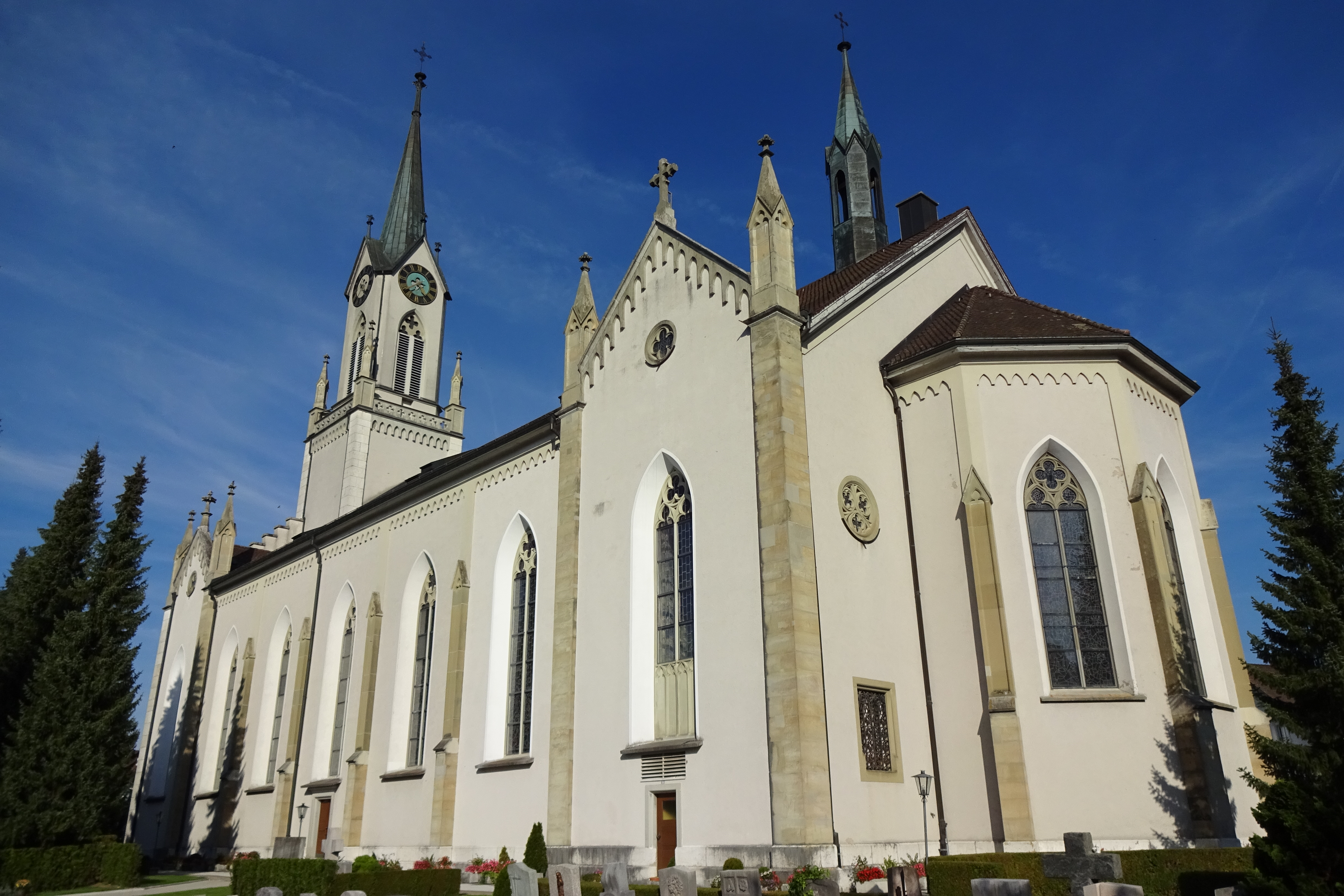
Catholic Church of Saint Conrad - west & south façade

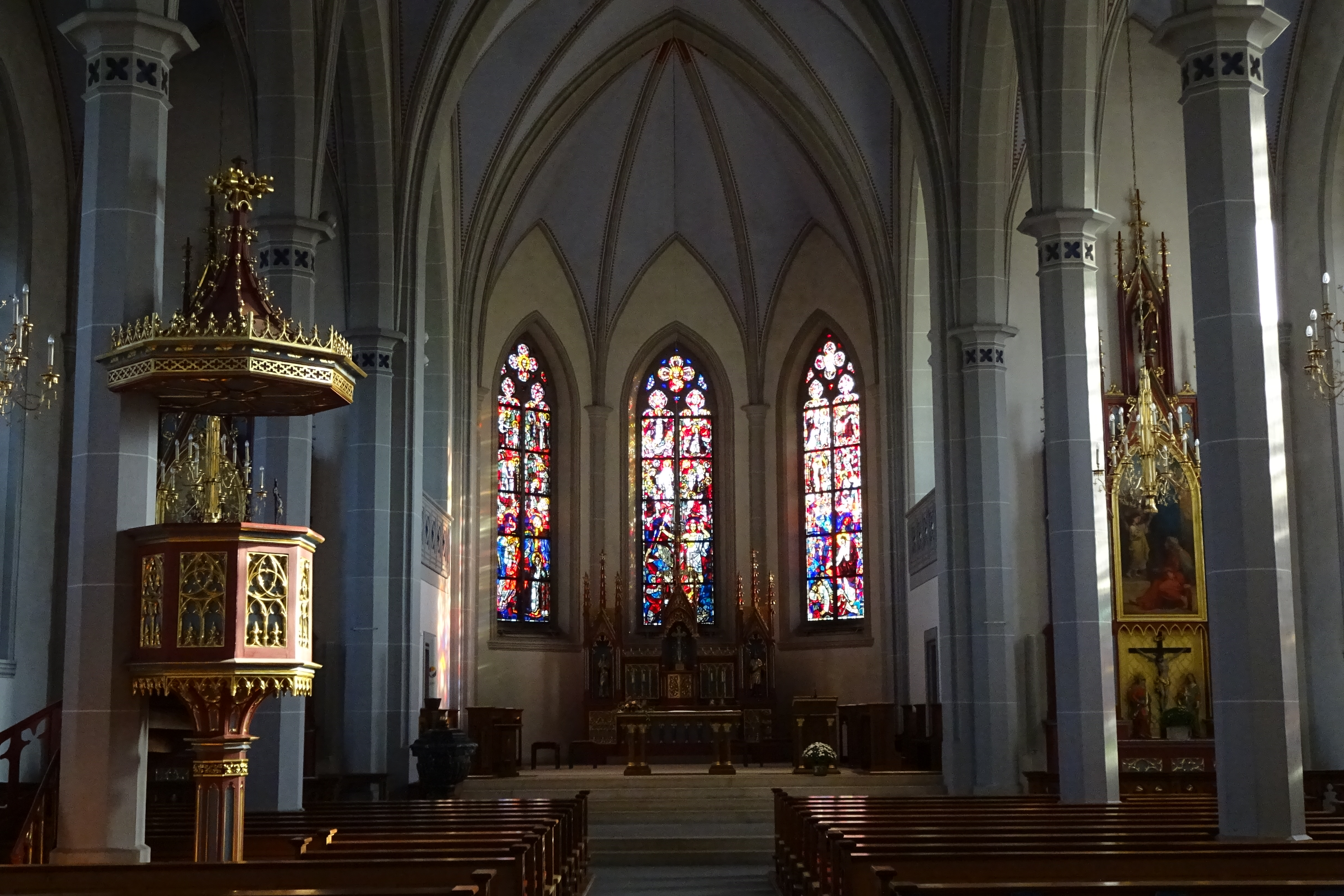
Catholic Church of Saint Conrad - interior view

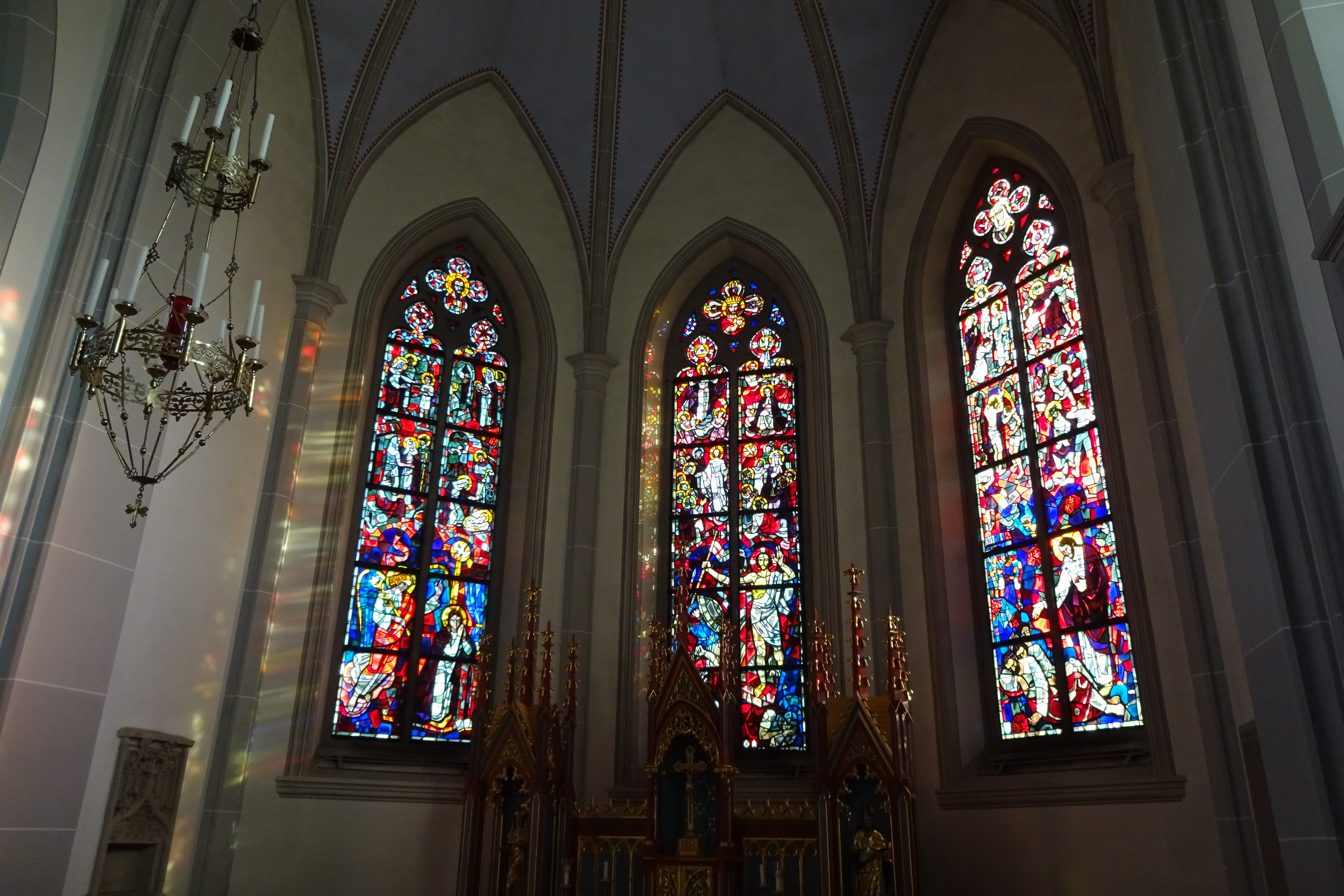
Catholic Church of Saint Conrad - interior view, choir loft windows
