= Neudorf, Lucerne =

Neudorf
- Former municipality
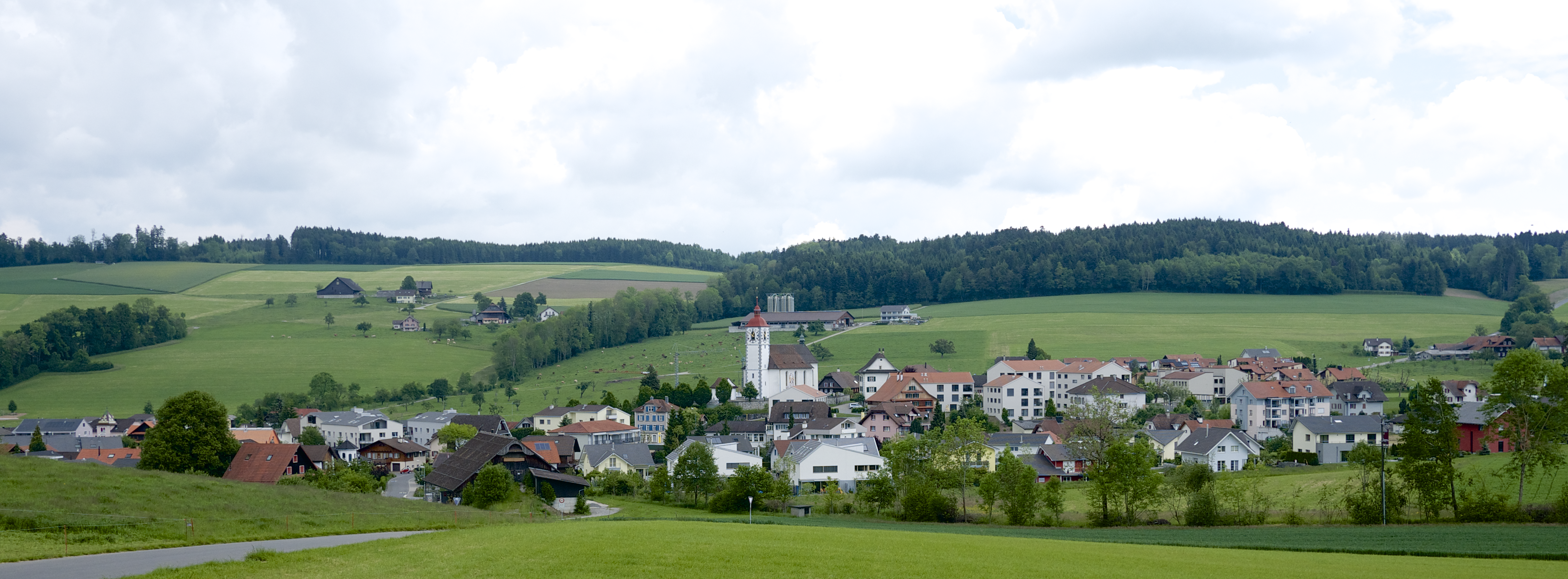

- Coat of arms
- Location of Neudorf
- Location within Switzerland Location within Canton of Lucerne
- Coordinates: 47°11′N 8°13′E
- Country: Switzerland
- Canton: Lucerne
- District: Sursee

Area
  - Total: 12.83 km^{2} (4.95 sq mi)
- Elevation: 672 m (2,205 ft)

Population (Dec 2010)
  - Total: 1,196
  - Density: 93.22/km^{2} (241.4/sq mi)
- Time zone: UTC+01:00 (CET)
  - Summer (DST): UTC+02:00 (CEST)
- Postal code: 6025
- SFOS number: 1092
- ISO 3166 code: CH-LU
- Surrounded by: Beromünster, Gunzwil, Römerswil, Hildisrieden, Sempach, Eich
- Website: www.neudorf.ch

Neudorf is a former municipality in the district of Sursee in the canton of Lucerne in Switzerland. On 1 January 2013 the former municipality of Neudorf merged into the municipality of Beromünster.

== History ==
Neudorf is first mentioned in 924 as Niwidorf and as Niudorf.

== Geography ==
Aerial view (1964)

Before the merger, Neudorf had a total area of 12.8 km^{2} (4.9 mi^{2}). Of this area, 60.6% is used for agricultural purposes, while 33.5% is forested. Of the rest of the land, 5.4% is settled (buildings or roads) and the remainder (0.5%) is non-productive (rivers, glaciers or mountains). In the 1997 land survey, 33.52% of the total land area was forested. Of the agricultural land, 57.6% is used for farming or pastures, while 3.04% is used for orchards or vine crops. Of the settled areas, 2.42% is covered with buildings, 0.08% is industrial, 0.08% is classed as special developments, 0.23% is parks or greenbelts and 2.57% is transportation infrastructure. Of the unproductive areas, 0.16% is unproductive standing water (ponds or lakes), and 0.31% are unproductive flowing water (rivers).

The former municipality is located in the upper Wynental.

== Demographics ==
Neudorf had a population (as of 2010) of 1,196. In 2007 at total of 7.7% of the population were foreign nationals. Over the last 10 years the population has grown at a rate of 5.9%. Most of the population (as of 2000) speaks German (94.9%), while Albanian is second most common (2.1%) and Spanish is third (0.6%).

In the 2007 election the most popular party was the FDP which received 36.3% of the vote. The next three most popular parties were the CVP (30.8%), the SVP (21.4%) and the Green Party (4.8%).

The age distribution in Neudorf is; 309 people or 27% of the population is 0–19 years old. 315 people or 27.6% are 20–39 years old, and 381 people or 33.3% are 40–64 years old. The senior population distribution is 112 people or 9.8% are 65–79 years old, 22 or 1.9% are 80–89 years old and 4 people or 0.3% of the population are 90+ years old.

In Neudorf about 72.3% of the population (between age 25-64) have completed either non-mandatory upper secondary education or additional higher education (either university or a Fachhochschule).

As of 2000 there are 348 households, of which 75 households (or about 21.6%) contain only a single individual. 66 or about 19.0% are large households, with at least five members. As of 2000 there were 247 inhabited buildings in the municipality, of which 188 were built only as housing, and 59 were mixed use buildings. There were 157 single family homes, 13 double family homes, and 18 multi-family homes in the municipality. Most homes were either two (131) or three (49) story structures. There were only 4 single story buildings and 4 four or more story buildings.

Neudorf has an unemployment rate of 1.44%. As of 2005, there were 112 people employed in the primary economic sector and about 38 businesses involved in this sector. 143 people are employed in the secondary sector and there are 20 businesses in this sector. 129 people are employed in the tertiary sector, with 26 businesses in this sector. As of 2000 51.4% of the population of the municipality were employed in some capacity. At the same time, females made up 38.6% of the workforce.

In the 2000 census the religious membership of Neudorf was; 851 (80.4%) were Roman Catholic, and 103 (9.7%) were Protestant, with an additional 5 (0.47%) that were of some other Christian faith. There are 1 individuals (0.09% of the population) who are Jewish. There are 26 individuals (2.46% of the population) who are Muslim. Of the rest; there were 2 (0.19%) individuals who belong to another religion, 49 (4.63%) who do not belong to any organized religion, 21 (1.98%) who did not answer the question.

The historical population is given in the following table:

year	population
1456	c. 250
about 1695	up to 600
1798	710
1816	899
1850	850
1900	652
1950	791
2000	1,058

== Gallery ==
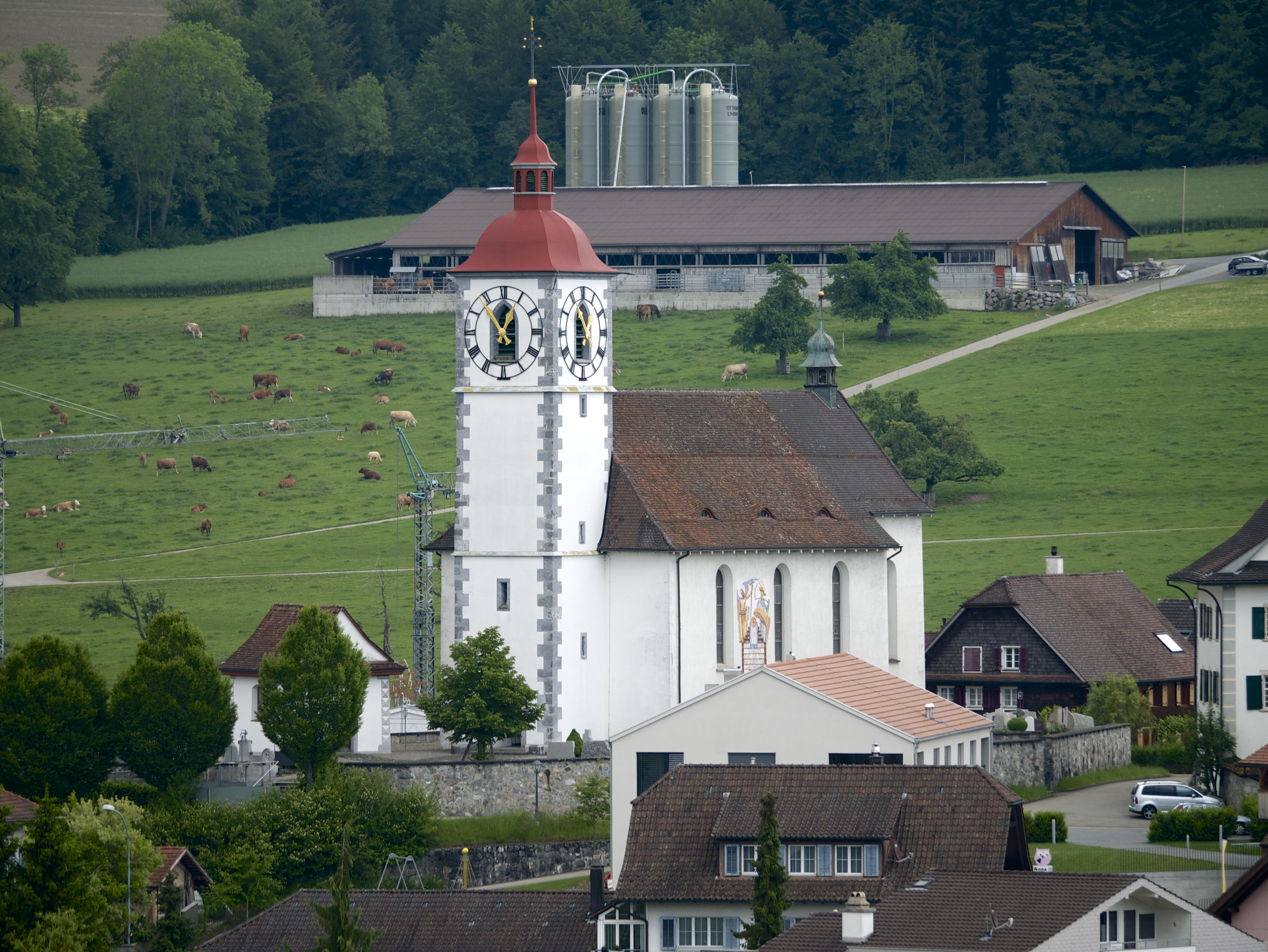
Church St. Agatha

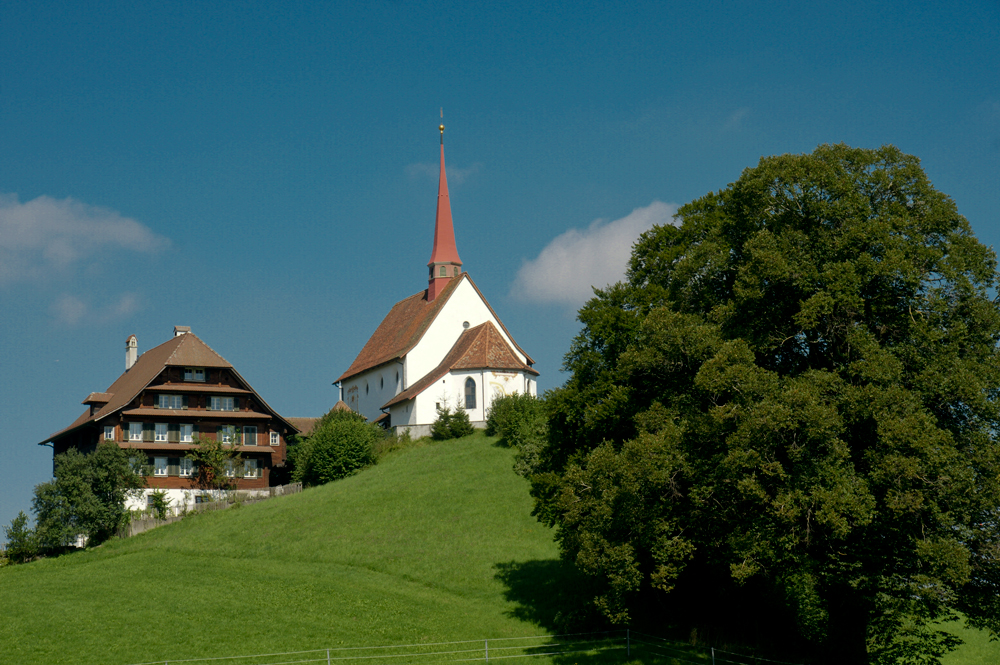
Pilgrimage church Gormund
