= Beromünster =

Municipality in Lucerne, Switzerland

- Municipality
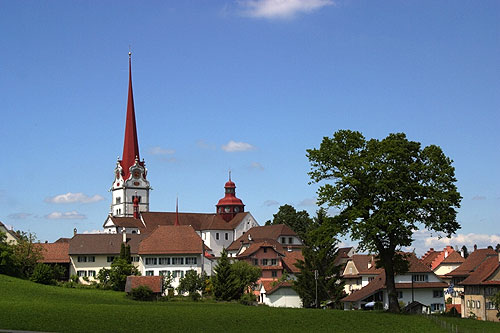

- Coat of arms
- Location of Beromünster
- Location within Switzerland Location within Canton of Lucerne
- Coordinates: 47°12′N 8°12′E
- Country: Switzerland
- Canton: Lucerne
- District: Sursee

Area
  - Total: 29.35 km^{2} (11.33 sq mi)
- Elevation: 642 m (2,106 ft)

Population (December 2020)
  - Total: 6,661
  - Density: 227.0/km^{2} (587.8/sq mi)
- Time zone: UTC+01:00 (CET)
  - Summer (DST): UTC+02:00 (CEST)
- Postal code: 6215
- SFOS number: 1081
- ISO 3166 code: CH-LU
- Localities: Schwarzenbach
- Surrounded by: Aesch, Beinwil am See (AG), Ermensee, Gunzwil, Menziken (AG), Mosen
- Website: www.beromuenster.ch

Beromünster is a municipality in the district of Sursee in the canton of Lucerne in Switzerland. On 1 September 2004 the former municipality of Schwarzenbach merged into the municipality of Beromünster. On 1 January 2009 the former municipality of Gunzwil merged into the municipality of Beromünster followed by Neudorf on 1 January 2013.

== History ==
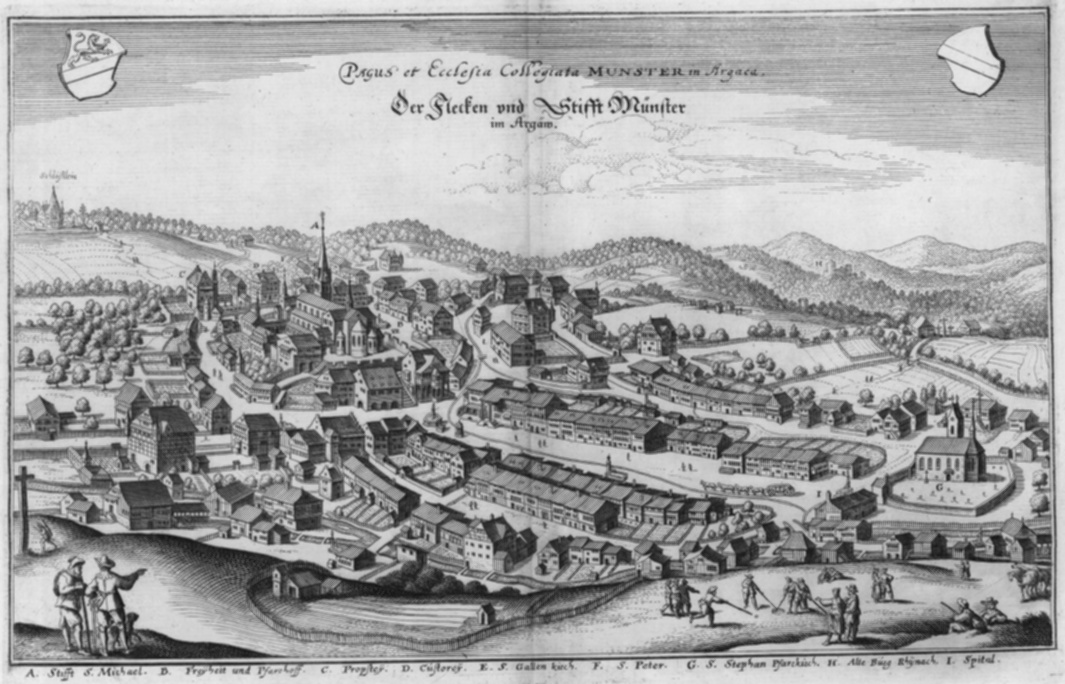
Münster im Aargau in 1654, by Matthäus Merian the Younger

Beromünster is first mentioned in 1223 as villa Beronensis. In 1333 it was mentioned as Münster in Ergöwe. Until 1934 it was known simply as Münster (LU).

== Geography ==
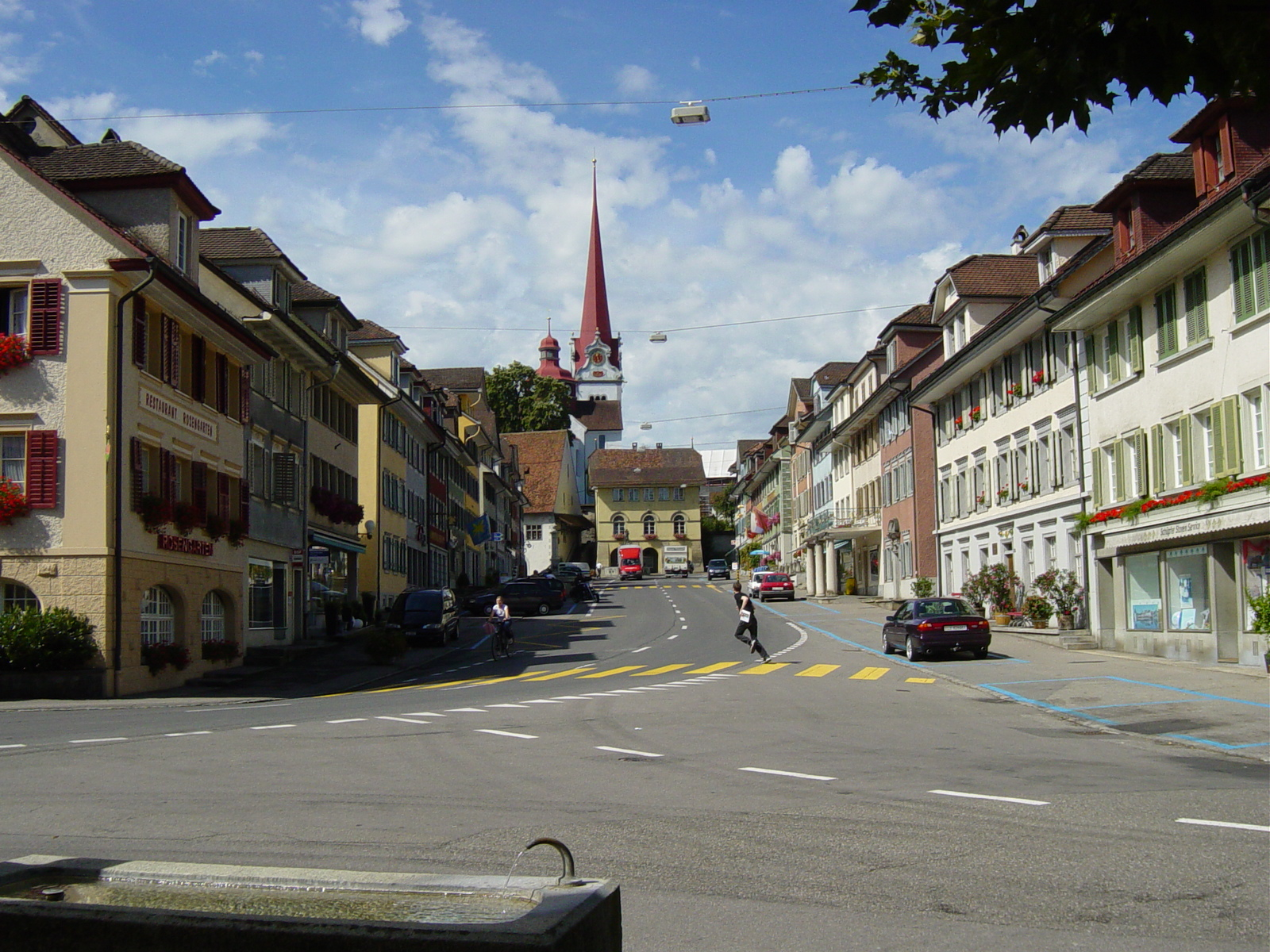
Flecken in Beromünster

Aerial view from 300 m by Walter Mittelholzer (1923)

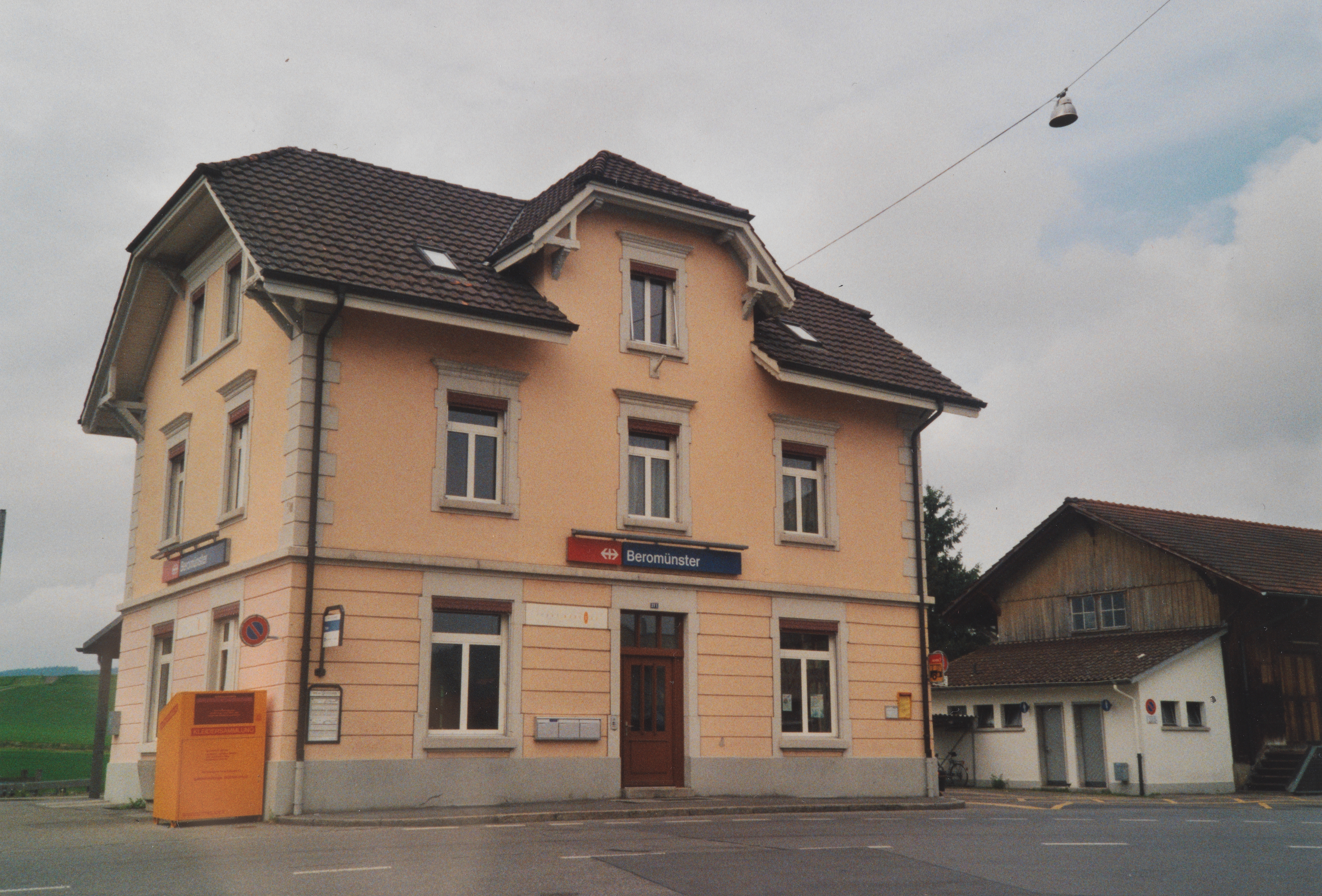
Former train station (2000)

Beromünster has an area of 42.12 km^{2} (16.26 sq mi). Of this area, 64.7% is used for agricultural purposes, while 21.1% is forested. Of the rest of the land, 14.1% is settled (buildings or roads) and the remainder (0.2%) is non-productive (rivers, glaciers or mountains). In the 1997 land survey, 16.32% of the total land area was forested. Of the agricultural land, 72.03% is used for farming or pastures, while 3.54% is used for orchards or vine crops. Of the settled areas, 4.29% is covered with buildings, 0.24% is industrial, 0.68% is classed as special developments, 0.27% is parks or greenbelts and 2.49% is transportation infrastructure. Of the unproductive areas, 0.1% is unproductive flowing water (rivers) and 0.03% is other unproductive land.

The municipality is located in the upper Wynental. It consists of two separate settlements, Flecken in a depression and the church owned village of Beromünster on the western side of a hill. Flecken consists of three rows of houses, built following a fire in 1764, along the main and parallel side road. Since 1 January 2009 it has also included the municipality of Gunzwil. The merged municipality in 2009 had an area of 29.35 km^{2} (11.33 sq mi).

== Demographics ==
Beromünster has a population (as of 31 December 2020) of 6,661. As of 2007, 13.4% of the population was made up of foreign nationals. The combined municipality has a population of 4,588 of which 10.1% are foreign. Over the last 10 years the population has grown at a rate of 2.1%. Most of the population (as of 2000) speaks German (90.1%), with Albanian being second most common ( 4.6%) and Serbo-Croatian being third ( 2.1%).

In the 2007 election the most popular party was the CVP which received 45.9% of the vote. The next three most popular parties were the SVP (23%), the FDP (19.1%) and the Green Party (5.5%).

The age distribution in Beromünster is; 1,190 people or 26.8% of the population is 0–19 years old. 1,067 people or 24.1% are 20–39 years old, and 1,514 people or 34.1% are 40–64 years old. The senior population distribution is 502 people or 11.3% are 65–79 years old, 138 or 3.1% are 80–89 years old and 25 people or 0.6% of the population are 90+ years old.

The entire Swiss population is generally well educated. In Beromünster about 71.1% of the population (between age 25-64) have completed either non-mandatory upper secondary education or additional higher education (either university or a Fachhochschule).

As of 2000 there are 1,542 households, of which 400 (or about 25.9%) contain only one individual. 253 or about 16.4% are large households, with at least five members. As of 2000 there were 917 inhabited buildings in the municipality, of which 669 were built only as housing, and 248 were mixed use buildings. There were 496 single family homes, 98 double family homes, and 75 multi-family homes in the municipality. Most homes were either two (398) or three (192) story structures. There were only 40 single story buildings and 39 four or more story buildings.

Beromünster has an unemployment rate of 1.18%. As of 2005, there were 91 people employed in the primary economic sector and about 32 businesses were involved. 308 people are employed in the secondary sector and there are 38 businesses in this sector. 709 people are employed in the tertiary sector, with 96 businesses in this sector. As of 2000 50.5% of the population of the municipality were employed in some capacity. At the same time, females made up 40.5% of the workforce.

In the 2000 census the religious membership of Beromünster was; 3,650 (82.1%) were Roman Catholic, and 330 (7.4%) were Protestant, with an additional 73 (1.64%) that were of some other Christian faith. There are 2 individuals (0.04% of the population) who are Jewish. There are 165 individuals (3.71% of the population) who are Muslim. Of the rest; there were 1 (0.02%) individuals who belonged to another religion, 113 (2.54%) who did not belong to any organized religion, 114 (2.56%) who did not answer the question.

The historical population is given in the following table:

year	population
1695	c. 890
1798	939
1837	1,071
1850	1,148
1860	1,198
1900	973
1950	1,434
2000	2,358

== Sights ==
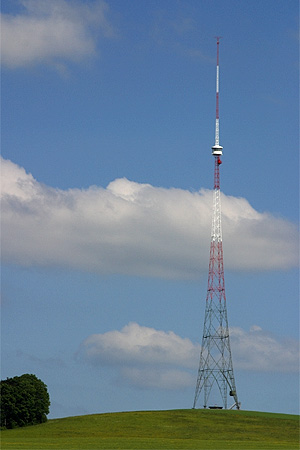
Blosenbergturm outside Beromünster

Beromünster is the site of the Blosenbergturm, a 215–217 m (705–712 ft) tall radio tower built in 1937. The castle at Beromünster was the site of one of the first printing presses in Switzerland, built in 1470.

== Weather ==
Beromünster has an average of 138.1 days of rain per year and receives an average of 1,223 mm (48.1 in) of precipitation. The wettest month is June, when Beromünster receives an average of 150 mm (5.9 in) of precipitation. During this month there is precipitation for an average of 13.2 days. The month with the most days of precipitation is May, with an average of 13.7, but with only 126 mm (5.0 in) of precipitation. The driest month of the year is October with an average of 74 mm (2.9 in) of precipitation over 13.2 days.

== Notable people ==
- Joseph Widmer (1779–1844) a Swiss Catholic theologian. A native of Hohenrain, he died in Beromünster.
- Ignaz Paul Vital Troxler (1780–1866) a Swiss physician, politician and philosopher
- Pia Fries (born 1955) a Swiss painter
