= Willisau Stadt =

Former municipality, canton of Lucerne

- Former municipality
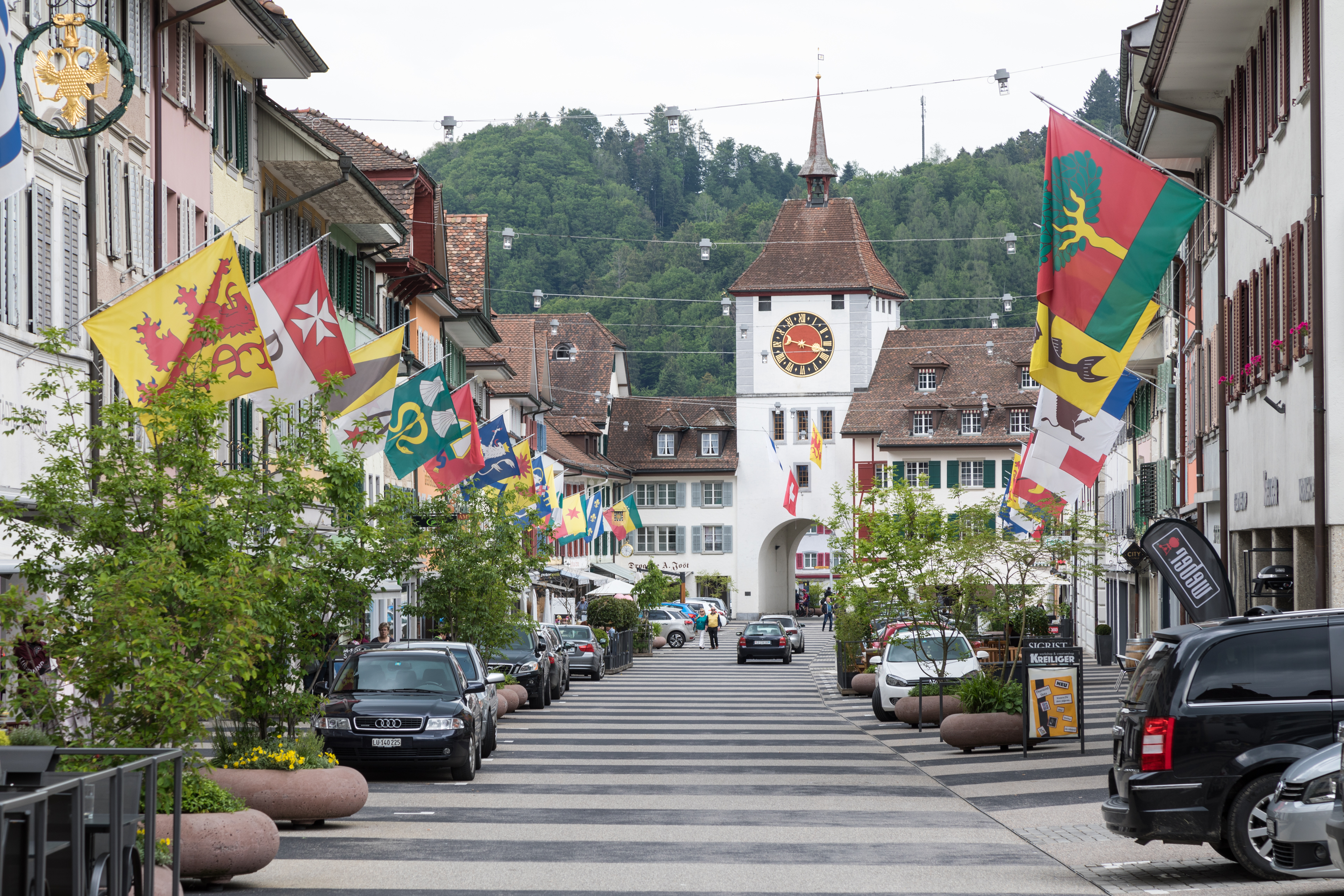
- The Hauptgasse and the Untertor (lower gate)

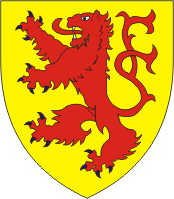
- Coat of arms
- Location of Willisau Stadt
- Location within Switzerland Location within Canton of Lucerne
- Coordinates: 47°7′13″N 7°59′19″E
- Country: Switzerland
- Canton: Lucerne
- District: Willisau
- Municipality: Willisau

Population (2000)
  - Total: 2,996
- Time zone: UTC+01:00 (CET)
  - Summer (DST): UTC+02:00 (CEST)
- SFOS number: 1149
- ISO 3166 code: CH-LU
- Website: Profile (in German),

Willisau Stadt is a former municipality in the Willisau district of the canton of Lucerne, Switzerland. In 2006 it merged with Willisau Land to form the municipality of Willisau. The town lies in the Lucerne Hinterland, at the foot of the northern foothills of the Napf. Willisau was raised to the status of a town in 1302/1303; in 1407 Lucerne bought the lordship.

== History ==
Willisau is first mentioned in 1101 as Willineshouwo. In Roman times the area around Willisau was settled by the 2nd–3rd century at the latest, and there may have been a Roman estate (villa rustica). Willisau arose from a fairly large parish village during the last wave of medieval town foundations, as a rather atypical small town on the edge of the Swiss Plateau. The lords of Honstetten (in the Hegau) are mentioned in 1101, and the barons (Freiherren) of Hasenburg in 1245, as holders of the church and of the church advocacy (Kirchenvogtei), which probably also included the pulpit court (Kanzelgericht) and the settlement. In 1302/1303, to enhance the Hasenburg lordship, Willisau was raised to the status of a town with a Habsburg privilege for a market and fortifications; in 1302 the barons became vassals of the Habsburgs. The town's land was church property and remained the allodial property (Eigen) of the Hasenburgs, and the town was open to the Habsburgs. During the Sempach War of 1386 Bern and Lucerne vied for influence, and Duke Leopold of Austria had Willisau burned as an unreliable position.

In 1407 Lucerne bought the lordship from the counts of Aarberg-Valangin, and in the 15th century Willisau became the de facto administrative center of the bailiwick (Amt). Like its legal predecessors, Lucerne appointed the Schultheiss: at first a bailiff of the county, he was under Lucerne a deputy bailiff (Untervogt) of the bailiwick and, in place of the former Ammann, the head of the town. Lucerne also appointed the town and bailiwick clerk and the nine town councillors. A town law is mentioned in the 15th century; it remained partly subordinate to the law of the bailiwick (Amtsrecht). In the 15th century the town took over the administration of the bailiwick and its courts for the bailiff (Landvogt), who resided in Lucerne until 1653: certain police and regional-court functions, and the civil court in the parish of Willisau and in other parts of the bailiwick. During the Onion War of 1513–1515 conflicts arose between the town and the bailiwick of Willisau. In the Peasants' War of 1653 Willisau was able to strengthen its autonomy. The town had neither its own criminal court (Blutgericht) nor its own military organization. In the late Middle Ages its population was highly mobile; only in the 17th and 18th centuries were admissions to citizenship handled more restrictively.

After the Hasenburgs and the Aarbergs, Lucerne held the right of patronage (Kollatur) until 1895. The old parish of Willisau probably also included Luthern, Ufhusen, Menznau and Hasle until the High Middle Ages. In the late Middle Ages it comprised only Willisau and Willisau Land (without Mittmisrüti and Olisrüti), Hergiswil bei Willisau (until 1605), Hilferdingen and Ruefswil (now part of Ufhusen), and some farms on the Menzberg and toward Grosswangen. The church of Saints Peter and Paul, whose predecessor building dates to the early Middle Ages, was rebuilt in 1648–1652 and remodeled in 1689–1693. The present church, with its late Romanesque tower from the 13th or early 14th century, was newly built in 1804–1810 by Josef Purtschert and Josef Singer. Important subsidiary chapels are the chapel of St. Nicholas auf dem Berg, built between the end of the 12th and the beginning of the 13th century, and the pilgrimage chapel of the Holy Blood (Heiligblut), built in the 15th century and renovated in 1674–1675. Since 1886 Willisau has also had a Reformed parish.

Between 1798 and 1807 the two independent municipalities of Willisau Stadt and Willisau Land were formed. The territory of Willisau Stadt was reduced to the town's precinct (Bürgerzihl) and the commons (Allmenden). Under the Helvetic Republic and the Mediation, Willisau was politically disadvantaged because it could not provide a member of the Grand Council. In 1814 it received municipal rights (Munizipalrecht). When the town was founded, a walled layout was built on the through road from Lucerne to Bern and Solothurn. Willisau was destroyed in the Gugler War of 1375 and in the Sempach War of 1386, and it was struck by devastating fires in 1471 and 1704. Until 1704 the houses were mostly built of wood. The town hall is recorded from the 15th century, the hospital from 1407 and the leper house (Siechenhaus) from 1418. A town school was established in the 16th century. From 1808 to 1810 Willisau housed the cantonal teacher training college, and from 1833 to 1836 Friedrich Fröbel's educational institution was located in the bailiff's castle (Landvogteischloss). The secondary school (Mittelschule), without Matura classes, was founded in 1864 as an extended district school (Bezirksschule). From the early 19th century a suburb developed between the lower gate (Untertor) and the railway station. The lower gate, demolished in 1854, was rebuilt in 1979–1980 and shapes today's townscape.

As a small farming town, Willisau kept the village open-field system (Zelgverfassung). Probably after the fires of the 14th century, it received the large high forests in the area of the old parish of Willisau from the lords of the town. For a long time the crafts and trades were little specialized; craftsmen's confraternities existed from the beginning of the 16th century. Weekly markets and annual fairs are recorded from 1330; in the 18th century there were six annual fairs. Willisau served the Hinterland as a trading center for goods such as cloth, dairy products and livestock. A first market hall (Kaufhaus) was destroyed in 1375/1386 and burned down in 1471; after the fire of 1704 it was rebuilt at another site. Around 1810 a theater hall was set up on its top floor. To finance public and military buildings, Willisau received from Lucerne the customs duties and the Böspfennig (a tax on drinks) before 1465, and a grain tax in 1458. Nine tavern licenses (Tavernenrechte) are known from the 16th and 17th centuries. A fairly large silk-weaving mill was established in the 19th century.

Willisau was connected to the Wolhusen–Huttwil railway, which opened in 1895. The Distillerie Willisau SA (Diwisa) has existed since 1918, a biscuit factory (Willisauer Ringli) since 1948 and the furniture factory Wellis AG since 1931. A branch of the Zofingen company Ritex was established in 1947, and a production plant of Lego in 1993 (closed in 2006). The Sparkasse Willisau savings bank existed from 1903 to 1940; the Volksbank Willisau AG was founded in 1906 and in 1996 merged with the Luzerner Landbank to form the Luzerner Regiobank AG. Local newspapers have been published in Willisau since 1851; the Willisauer Bote Medien und Print AG has existed since 1923. In 2005 the secondary sector provided 42% and the tertiary sector 57% of the jobs. From 1966 Niklaus Troxler organized jazz concerts in Willisau, and in 1975 he founded the Jazz Festival Willisau.

In the 15th century Willisau probably had 450–550 inhabitants; it had about 570 around 1695, 970 in 1798, 1,231 in 1850, 1,594 in 1900, 2,129 in 1950 and 2,996 in 2000.

== Bibliography ==
- Die Kunstdenkmäler des Kantons Luzern, vol. 5, 1959, pp. 223–280
- A. Bickel, Willisau, 2 vols., 1982
- J. Brülisauer et al., Das Heilig Blut zu Willisau, 1992
- P. Eggenberger, Die Geschichte einer viermal zerstörten Stadt, 2002
- M. Freihofer-Heger et al. (eds.), 700 Jahre Willisau, 2003

=== Sources ===
- Collection of Swiss Law Sources, LU II/2/2
