= Hasenburg Castle (Willisau) =

Castle site in Willisau, Switzerland

- Hasenburg
- Willisau, canton of Lucerne

Site information
- Type: Castle
- Condition: Castle site, abandoned after 1386; excavated in 1958–1959

Location
- Coordinates: 47.125636°N 8.003883°E

Site history
- Built: Second half of the 13th century
- Built by: Barons of Hasenburg

Hasenburg Castle (German: Hasenburg) is a castle site (Burgstelle) on a spur of the Wellberg above the Wigger in the municipality of Willisau in the canton of Lucerne, Switzerland, in the area of the former municipality of Willisau Land. The castle was built after the middle of the 13th century by the barons (Freiherren) of Hasenburg, and from 1285 it was the administrative center of their possessions around Willisau, the lordship of Hasenburg. It was abandoned after it was plundered and burned in the Sempach War of 1386, and in 1407 the lordship was sold to Lucerne.

== History ==
Hasenburg is first mentioned in 1285 as die nüwen Hasenburc ("the new Hasenburg"). The castle was built after the middle of the 13th century by the barons of Hasenburg. After the division of the family's possessions in 1285 it became the administrative center of their Willisau possessions. These comprised the estates in the Aargau south of the Hauenstein, above all the patronage rights in the large parish of Willisau and in Menznau, which were linked with the low lordship and could be expanded. The lordship of Hasenburg was not territorially compact and was primarily an appurtenance of the castle. The barons of Hasenburg also had ministeriales of the same name, probably a branch of the lords of Schenkon.

Around 1302 the Hasenburgs placed themselves and their castle in feudal dependence on the Habsburgs, in return for the privilege of founding a town at Willisau. In 1321 they took over the Austrian office (Amt) of Willisau as a pledge. In the second half of the 14th century their increasingly indebted lordship gradually broke up. After 1364 it passed by inheritance to the barons of Aarberg-Valangin. The castle was abandoned after it had been plundered by the Austrian towns of Zofingen and Sursee and burned by the Bernese in the Sempach War of 1386. In 1407 Wilhelm von Aarberg sold the lordship of Hasenburg to Lucerne. Excavations were carried out on the castle site in 1958–1959.

== Bibliography ==
- A. Bickel, Willisau, 1982
