= Willisau Land =

Former municipality, canton of Lucerne

- Former municipality
- The ponds at Ostergau
- Location of Willisau Land
- Location within Switzerland Location within Canton of Lucerne
- Coordinates: 47°6′59″N 8°0′0″E
- Country: Switzerland
- Canton: Lucerne
- District: Willisau
- Municipality: Willisau

Population (2000)
  - Total: 4,105
- Time zone: UTC+01:00 (CET)
  - Summer (DST): UTC+02:00 (CEST)
- SFOS number: 1148
- ISO 3166 code: CH-LU
- Website: Profile (in German),

Willisau Land is a former municipality in the Willisau district of the canton of Lucerne, Switzerland. In 2006 it merged with Willisau Stadt to form the municipality of Willisau. It covered a fairly large area of the hinterland west and south of the town of Willisau, with many scattered farms and a few hamlets. Its territory also included the ruins of Hasenburg Castle and the castle site (Burgstelle) of Gütsch, which belonged to the barons of Wediswil.

== History ==
The name Willisau is first mentioned in 1101, as Willineshouwo. The settlements of Ostergau, Gesserswil, Bauwil, Daiwil, Opfersei (now in the municipality of Hergiswil bei Willisau) and Wüschiswil (in the district of Sursee since 1814) were ruled in the Middle Ages by various local lords (Twingherren): the Habsburgs, the lords of Hasenburg and the lords of Wolhusen. They developed rudimentary structures of local lordship (Twing) and of the open-field system (Zelg), without a court of their own. From the 15th century at the latest, the town of Willisau held the low jurisdiction in the area of the old parish.

In the late Middle Ages separate tax and recruitment districts for the town and the countryside emerged within the parish, and in the 17th and 18th centuries there were two tax districts (Steuerbriefe) for poor relief, which were united only from 1757 to 1763. The political municipality of Willisau Land was created in 1798, 1803 and 1807, mainly on the basis of the tax district of the rural parishioners. Olisrüti and Mittmisrüti were added in 1820. Until the merger, Willisau Stadt was an enclave within the municipality of Willisau Land. In church matters, Willisau Stadt and Willisau Land have always formed the parish of Willisau. The chapel of St. James on the Bösegg, probably dating from 1722, was rebuilt in 1949. In 1894 the first Reformed church in the Lucerne countryside was built in Willisau Land.

The municipality practiced cereal growing as well as livestock and dairy farming. Numerous mills are recorded from the Middle Ages onward. In 2005 the primary sector still provided 28% of the jobs in the municipality. The landscape of ponds in Ostergau, created by peat cutting, is protected. In the 20th century the proximity of Willisau Stadt led to the building of urban residential districts. The industrial zone is home to manufacturers of plastic sheets, furniture and agricultural machinery, and to wood-processing and wood-impregnation businesses.

Willisau Land was the seat of the trade school (Gewerbeschule, founded in 1908) and the commercial vocational school (1912), which were united in 1926; the trade school moved into a new building in 1985. Together with the sales school (1966), they are now part of the vocational training center for business, IT and technology (Berufsbildungszentrum Wirtschaft, Informatik und Technik). Willisau Land was also the seat of the cantonal agricultural school (1921–1999), of the school for women farmers (Bäuerinnenschule, 1947–1997) and, since 1971, of the secondary school (Mittelschule) at Schlossfeld. Rural primary schools are run in Käppelimatt, Rohrmatt and Schülen; the one in Ostergau existed from 1812 to 1967.

Willisau Land had about 1,140 inhabitants around 1695, 2,173 in 1798, 3,161 in 1850, 2,537 in 1900, 3,144 in 1950 and 4,105 in 2000.

== Bibliography ==
- A. Bickel, Willisau, 2 vols., 1982
- J. Zihlmann, Namenlandschaft im Quellgebiet der Wigger, 1984
- A. Häfliger, Willisau-Land, 1996
- Adolf Reinle, Das Amt Willisau mit St. Urban, 1959, pp. 223–280 (Die Kunstdenkmäler des Kantons Luzern, 5)
