= Soppensee =

Lake in Lucerne, Switzerland

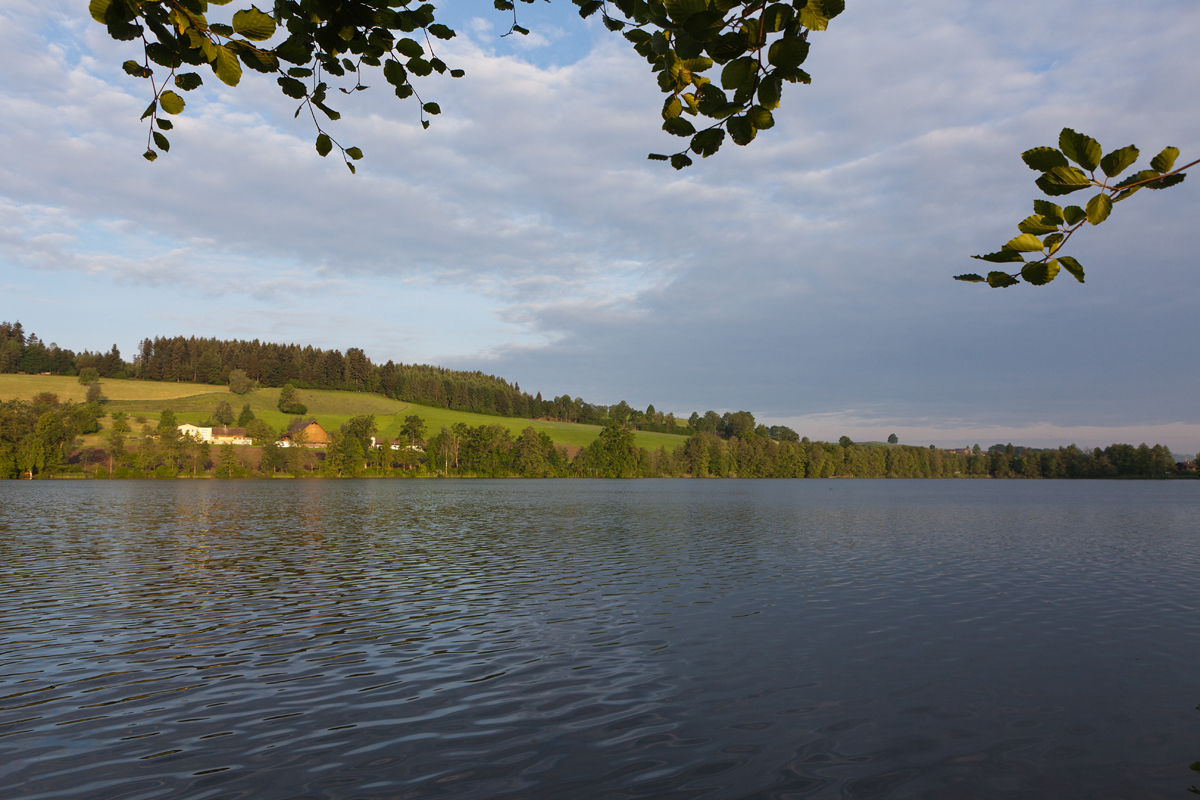

- Location within Canton of Lucerne Location within Switzerland Location within Alps
- Interactive map of Soppensee
- Location: Canton of Lucerne
- Coordinates: 47°5′25″N 8°4′51″E
- Basin countries: Switzerland
- Surface area: 22.7 ha (56 acres)
- Max. depth: 27 m (89 ft)
- Surface elevation: 596 m (1,955 ft)

Soppensee is a lake in Canton of Lucerne, Switzerland. The surface area is 22.7 ha (56 acres). The lake and its surroundings are located in the municipalities of Buttisholz, Menznau, and Ruswil.
