= Trub =

- Municipality
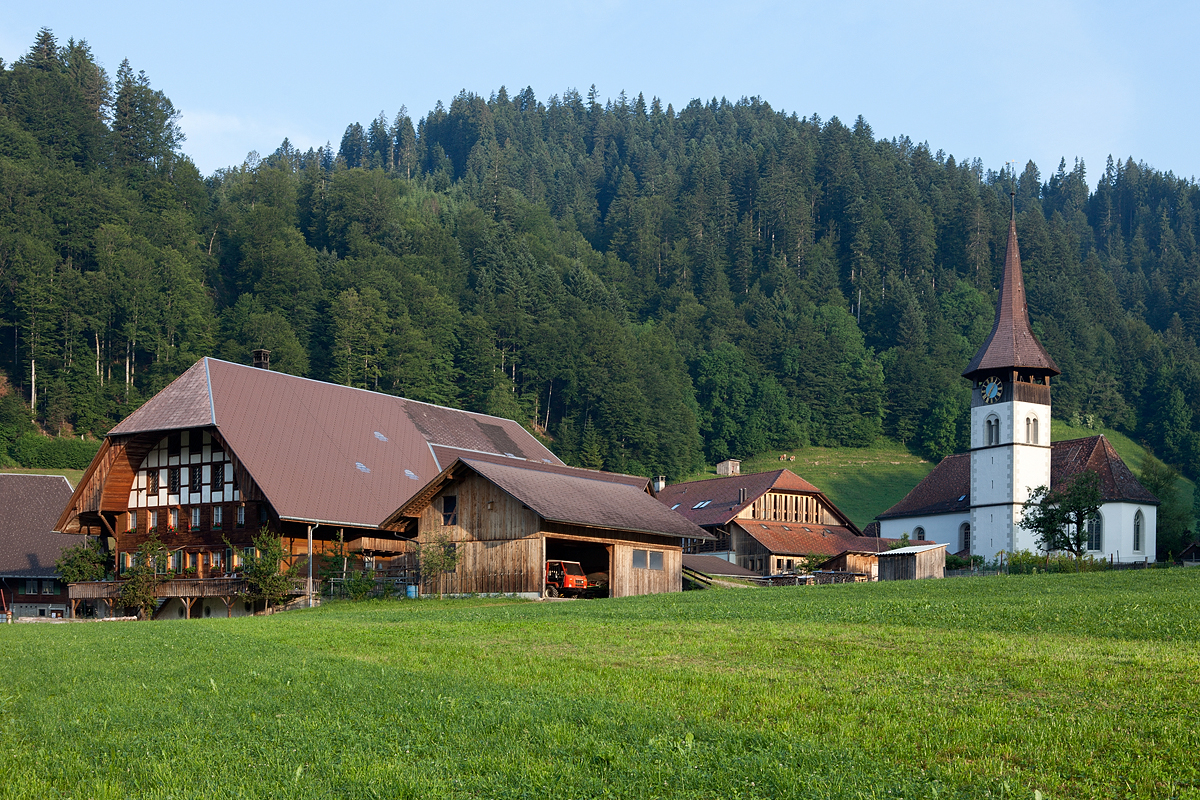
- Trub village

- Flag Coat of arms
- Location of Trub
- Location within Switzerland Location within Canton of Bern
- Coordinates: 46°56′N 7°53′E
- Country: Switzerland
- Canton: Bern
- District: Emmental

Government
  - Executive: Gemeinderat with 5 members
  - Mayor: Gemeindepräsident(in); Michelle Renaud (as of 2026)

Area
  - Total: 62.0 km^{2} (23.9 sq mi)
- Elevation: 790 m (2,590 ft)

Population (December 2020)
  - Total: 1,314
  - Density: 21.2/km^{2} (54.9/sq mi)
- Time zone: UTC+01:00 (CET)
  - Summer (DST): UTC+02:00 (CEST)
- Postal code: 3556
- SFOS number: 908
- ISO 3166 code: CH-BE
- Surrounded by: Eggiwil, Escholzmatt (LU), Hergiswil bei Willisau (LU), Langnau im Emmental, Luthern (LU), Marbach (LU), Romoos (LU), Sumiswald, Trubschachen
- Website: www.trub.ch

Trub is one of the largest municipalities of Switzerland (62 km^{2}) in size, but not in population. It is located in the Emmental region of the canton of Bern in the administrative district of Emmental.

== History ==
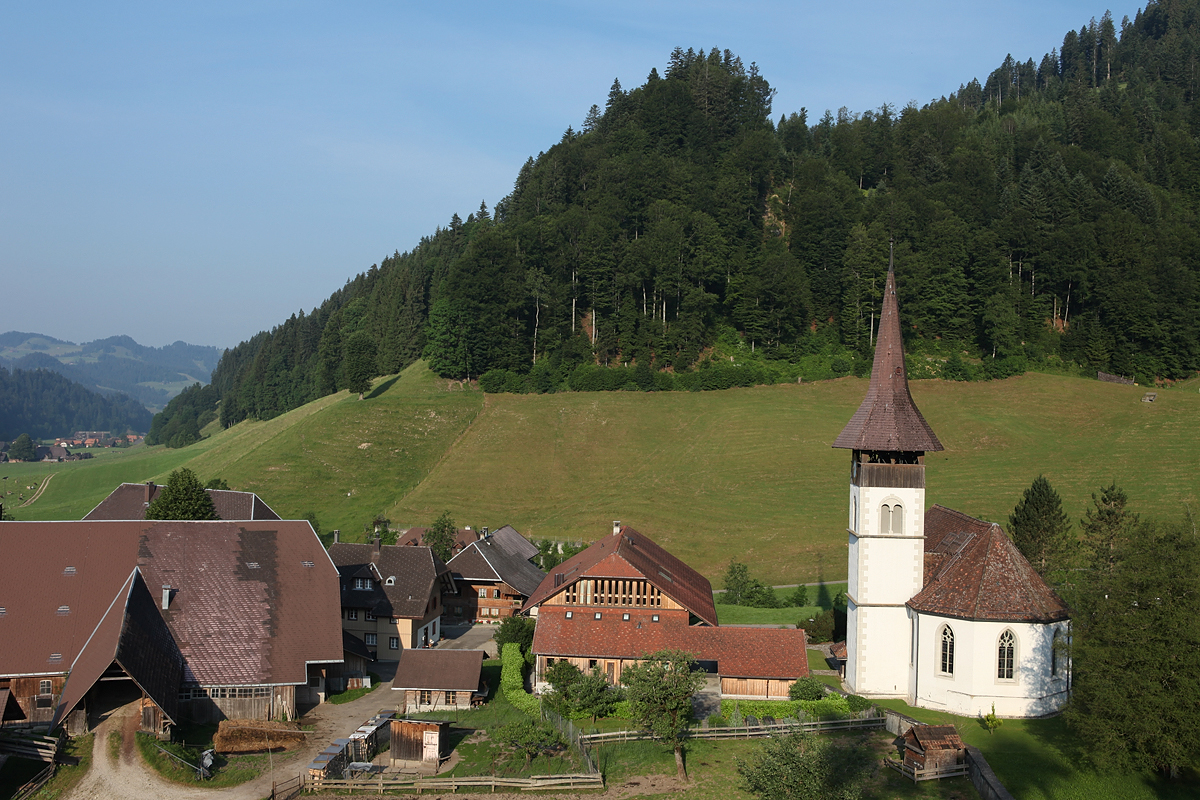
Trub village and the village church

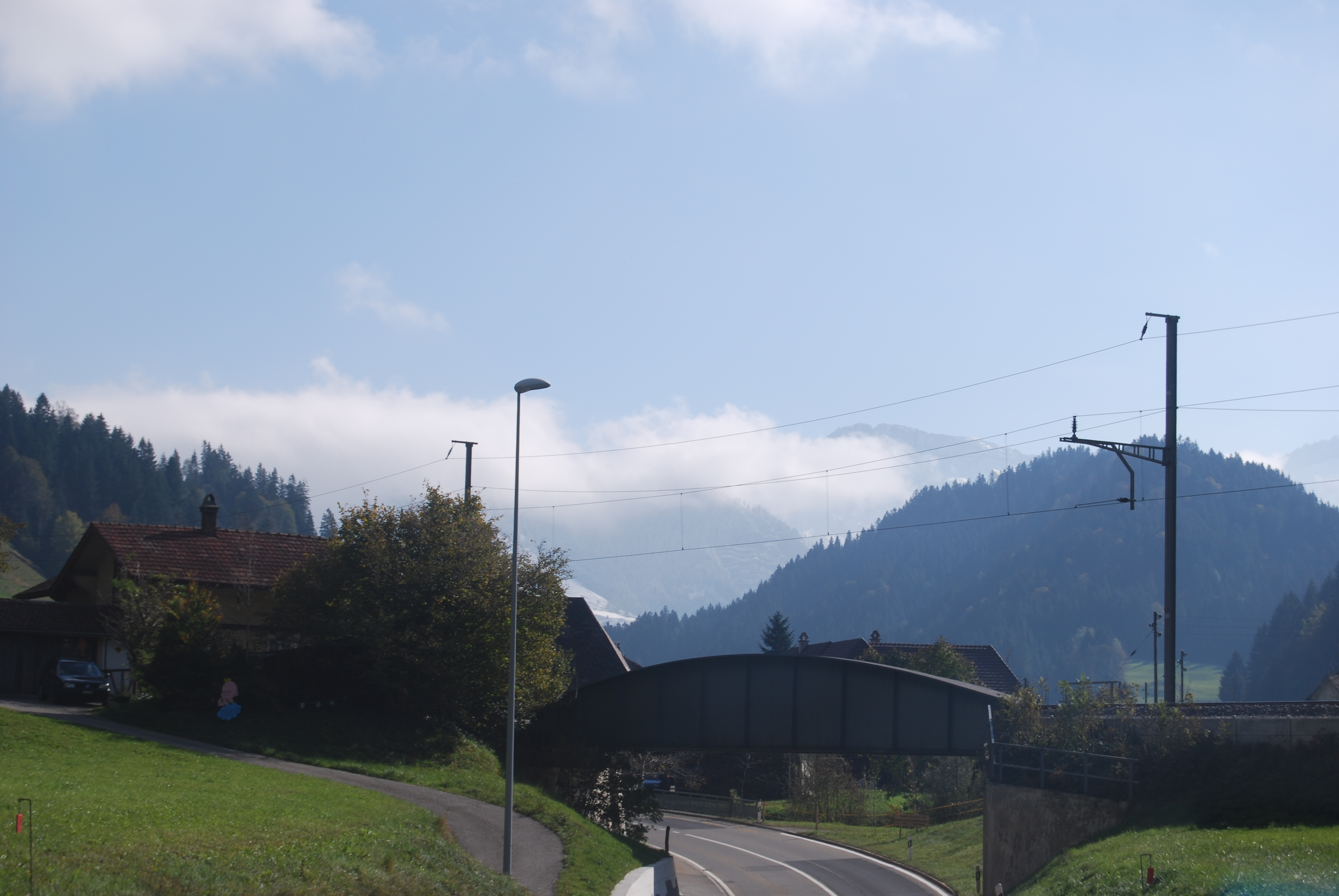
Kröschenbrunnen railway bridge. The railroad helped open Trub up to industry in the 19th century

Trub is first mentioned in 1139 as Truoba. Around 1258 it was mentioned as Trouba.

Much of the early history of Trub is tied to the Benedictine Trub Abbey, which ruled over much of the modern municipality. The inhabitants of the village were ruled from the Abbey and were partly under ecclesiastical law, though the high court was under the secular Kyburgs. In 1408 Bern acquired the remaining Kyburg lands including the high court rights in Trub. During the early 15th century the population of the village dropped and many of the outlying farms were abandoned. As the population recovered in the second half of that century, many alpine meadows and small settlements were once opened up.

In 1528, Bern adopted the new faith of the Protestant Reformation and secularized all monasteries, including Trub. The land and lower courts in Trub came under Bernese control. The monastery church has always been the village church. It was converted into a Protestant church and the patronage rights passed to Bern. The original church was probably a Romanesque building. It was replaced with the current building in 1641–45, though some of the walls come from the earlier building.

Following the Protestant Reformation, a number of Anabaptists settled in Trub, which caused problems with the government in Bern. In 1532, the village was ordered to drive out all its Anabaptists, though many remained. Over the following centuries, until 1742 when it was finally no longer illegal, Anabaptist hunters would occasionally visit Trub to attempt to capture them. Several homes in the community, including the house at Hintere Hütte nr. 239, had special hidden rooms that the Anabaptists could hide in to avoid the hunters.

Following the 1798 French invasion, Trub became part of the Helvetic Republic district of Oberemmental. Five years later, following the collapse of the Republic and 1803 Act of Mediation, it was transferred to the Oberamt Signau.

In the 16th century dairy and cheese production became a major part of the local economy. Bernese patricians gradually bought up all the high alpine meadows, which they then leased back to the local dairy farmers. The valley floors were used to raise hay for the cattle when they were brought back down to spend winters on the valley floor. As the population grew and agriculture became more regulated and less labor-intensive, many residents were forced to emigrate beginning in the 18th century. Despite emigration, many residents lived in poverty and in 1810 a hospital for the poor opened in Trub. So many citizens emigrated that today 1 in 147 Swiss can trace their roots back to Trub. The construction of various valley roads between 1832 and 1860 as well as the construction of a train station of the Bern-Lucerne Railroad in Trubschachen in 1875 helped open up the village to industry. The economy shifted from agriculture to processing wood, building automotive parts, transporting goods and the services industry. In 2010 the municipality had two school houses in Trub and Fankhaus.

== Geography ==
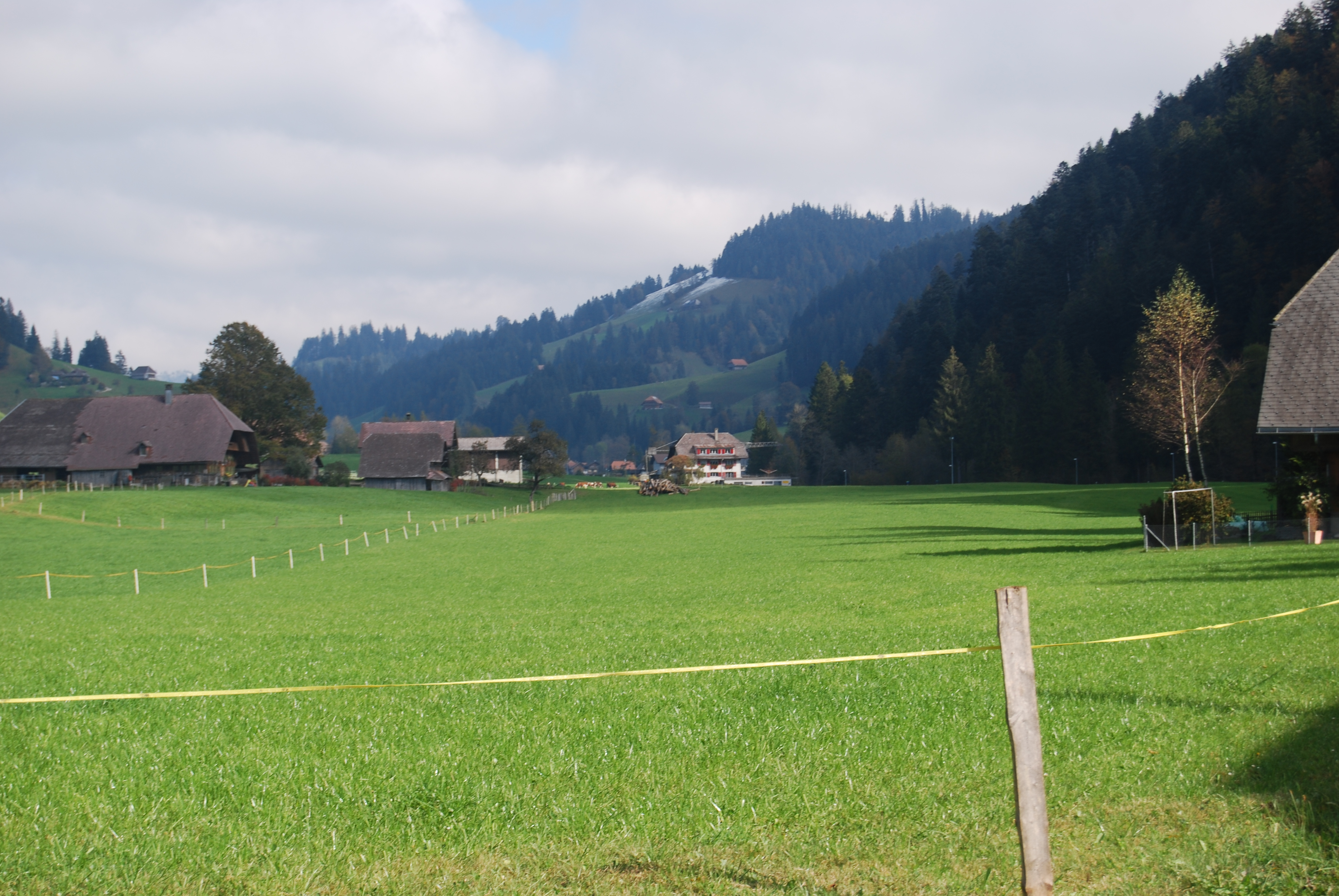
View of the Napf mountain and foothills from Trub

Aerial view by Walter Mittelholzer (1925)

Trub has an area of 61.99 km^{2} (23.93 sq mi). As of 2012, a total of 25.1 km^{2} (9.7 mi^{2}) or 40.5% is used for agricultural purposes, while 34.74 km^{2} (13.41 mi^{2}) or 56.0% is forested. The rest of the municipality is 1.43 km^{2} (0.55 mi^{2}) or 2.3% is settled (buildings or roads), 0.49 km^{2} (0.19 mi^{2}) or 0.8% is either rivers or lakes and 0.21 km^{2} (0.081 mi^{2}) or 0.3% is unproductive land.

During the same year, housing and buildings made up 1.1% and transportation infrastructure made up 1.1%. A total of 53.3% of the total land area is heavily forested and 2.7% is covered with orchards or small clusters of trees. Of the agricultural land, 2.5% is used for growing crops and 24.9% is pasturage and 13.0% is used for alpine pastures. All the water in the municipality is flowing water.

The large, mostly rural municipality is located on the southern slopes of the Napf mountain and includes both banks of the Ilfis river. It consists of the village of Trub, the neighborhoods of Brandösch, Fankhaus, Twären and Gummen, the business development of Kröschenbrunnen as well as scattered farm houses and alpine meadows.

On 31 December 2009 Amtsbezirk Signau, the municipality's former district, was dissolved. On the following day, 1 January 2010, it joined the newly created Verwaltungskreis Emmental.

== Coat of arms ==
The blazon of the municipal coat of arms is Azure a Tau Cross couped Or.

== Demographics ==
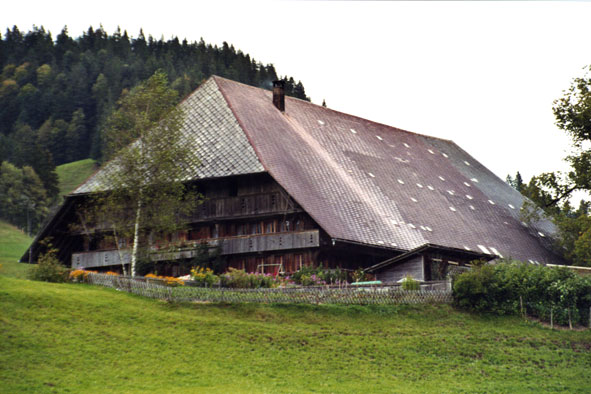
A farm-house in Trub.

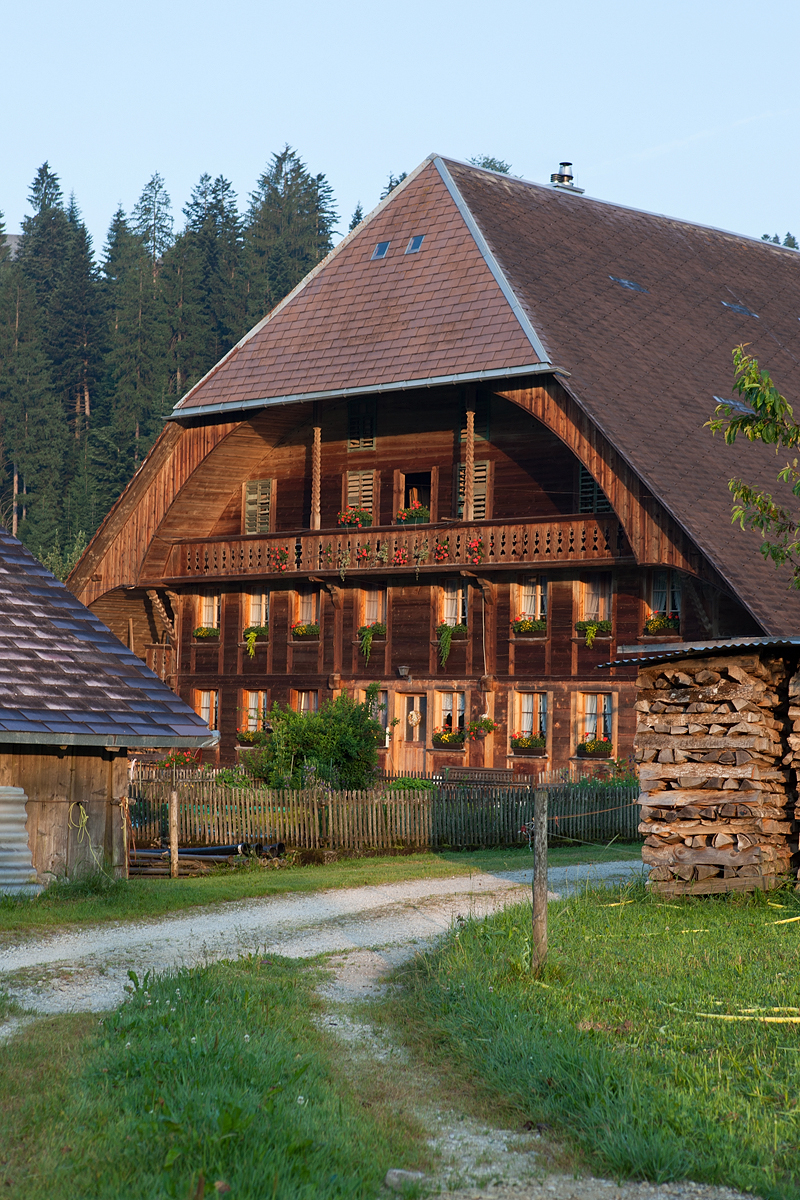
The Täuferhof farm house in Trub

Today, Trub has just under 1,370 inhabitants (2012), but as a result of centuries of emigration from the Emmental region, over 50,000 people are registered as citizens of the Trub Bürgergemeinde. Under Swiss law it includes all individuals who are citizens of the Bürgergemeinde, usually by having inherited the Bürgerrecht (citizenship), regardless of where they were born or where they may currently live. Instead of the place of birth, Swiss legal documents, e.g. passports, contain the Bürgerort (place of citizenship). About 1 in 134 Swiss citizens trace their ancestry back to this community, one of them being the 2002 Nobel Chemistry laureate, Kurt Wüthrich. The Fankhauser farm house in Trub dates back to 1601 and is the origin of the Fankhauser and Funkhouser families, which have since migrated to Virginia, United States as well as the Frankhouser family in Pennsylvania, United States.

Some of the Amish of the United States emigrated from the Trub region.

Trub has a population (as of December 2020) of 1,314. As of 2012, 1.8% of the population are resident foreign nationals. Between the last 2 years (2010–2012) the population changed at a rate of -2.7%. Migration accounted for -0.5%, while births and deaths accounted for -0.3%.

Most of the population (as of 2000) speaks German (1,499 or 99.5%) as their first language, Swedish and Serbo-Croatian both have 2 native speakers. There is 1 person who speaks French.

As of 2008, the population was 52.2% male and 47.8% female. The population was made up of 717 Swiss men (51.4% of the population) and 12 (0.9%) non-Swiss men. There were 654 Swiss women (46.8%) and 13 (0.9%) non-Swiss women. Of the population in the municipality, 935 or about 62.1% were born in Trub and lived there in 2000. There were 391 or 26.0% who were born in the same canton, while 106 or 7.0% were born somewhere else in Switzerland, and 27 or 1.8% were born outside of Switzerland.

As of 2012, children and teenagers (0–19 years old) make up 24.1% of the population, while adults (20–64 years old) make up 57.2% and seniors (over 64 years old) make up 18.8%.

As of 2000, there were 674 people who were single and never married in the municipality. There were 734 married individuals, 75 widows or widowers and 23 individuals who are divorced.

As of 2010, there were 103 households that consist of only one person and 94 households with five or more people. In 2000, a total of 473 apartments (80.2% of the total) were permanently occupied, while 96 apartments (16.3%) were seasonally occupied and 21 apartments (3.6%) were empty. The vacancy rate for the municipality, in 2013, was 0.2%. In 2012, single family homes made up 23.6% of the total housing in the municipality.

The historical population is given in the following chart:

== Economy ==
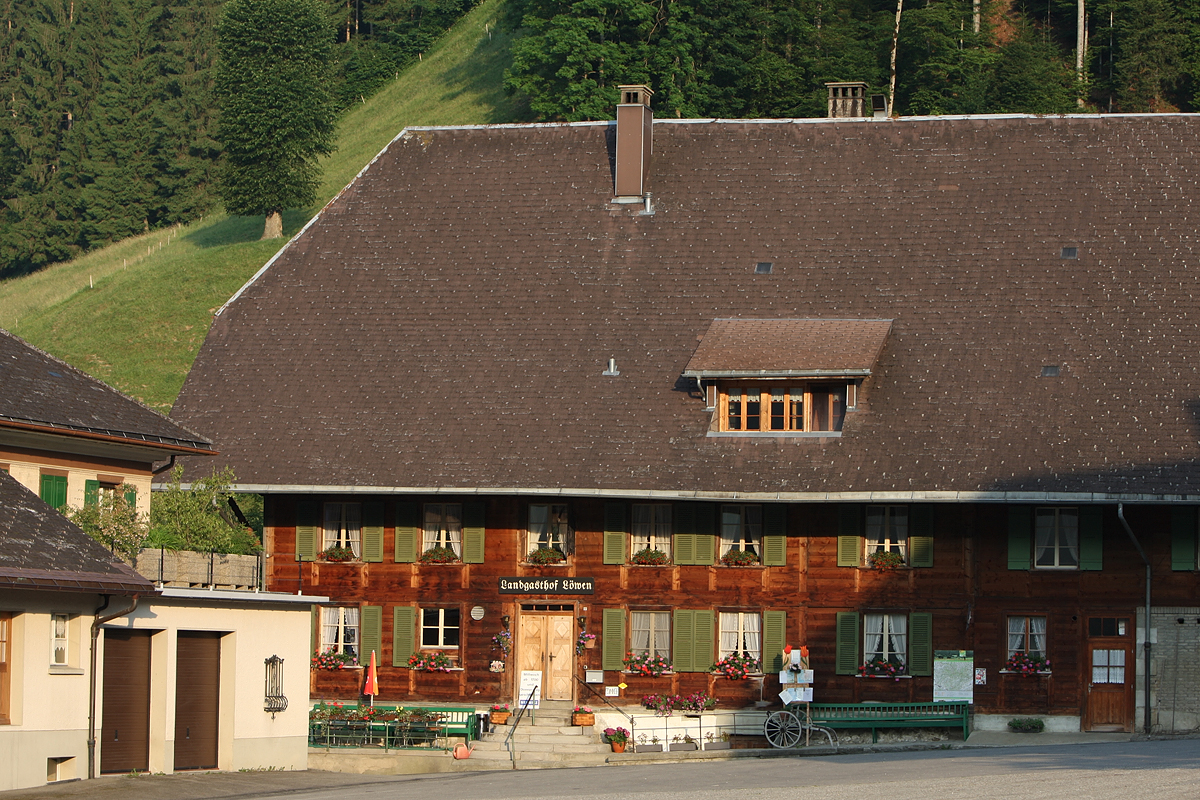
The Gasthof Löwen in Trub

As of 2011, Trub had an unemployment rate of 0.78%. As of 2011, there were a total of 673 people employed in the municipality. Of these, there were 409 people employed in the primary economic sector and about 139 businesses involved in this sector. 121 people were employed in the secondary sector and there were 22 businesses in this sector. 143 people were employed in the tertiary sector, with 44 businesses in this sector. There were 741 residents of the municipality who were employed in some capacity, of which females made up 38.3% of the workforce.

In 2008 there were a total of 450 full-time equivalent jobs. The number of jobs in the primary sector was 273, of which 266 were in agriculture and 8 were in forestry or lumber production. The number of jobs in the secondary sector was 88 of which 51 or (58.0%) were in manufacturing and 37 (42.0%) were in construction. The number of jobs in the tertiary sector was 89. In the tertiary sector; 16 or 18.0% were in wholesale or retail sales or the repair of motor vehicles, 11 or 12.4% were in the movement and storage of goods, 25 or 28.1% were in a hotel or restaurant, 7 or 7.9% were technical professionals or scientists, 16 or 18.0% were in education and 3 or 3.4% were in health care.

In 2000, there were 76 workers who commuted into the municipality and 309 workers who commuted away. The municipality is a net exporter of workers, with about 4.1 workers leaving the municipality for every one entering. A total of 432 workers (85.0% of the 508 total workers in the municipality) both lived and worked in Trub. Of the working population, 9% used public transportation to get to work, and 40.9% used a private car.

The local and cantonal tax rate in Trub is one of the lowest in the canton. In 2012 the average local and cantonal tax rate on a married resident, with two children, of Trub making 150,000 CHF was 12.5%, while an unmarried resident's rate was 18.6%. For comparison, the average rate for the entire canton in 2011, was 14.2% and 22.0%, while the nationwide average was 12.3% and 21.1% respectively.

In 2010 there were a total of 466 tax payers in the municipality. Of that total, 80 made over 75,000 CHF per year. There were 9 people who made between 15,000 and 20,000 per year. The greatest number of workers, 98, made between 20,000 and 30,000 CHF per year. The average income of the over 75,000 CHF group in Trub was 105,721 CHF, while the average across all of Switzerland was 131,244 CHF.

In 2011 a total of 3.5% of the population received direct financial assistance from the government.

== Heritage sites of national significance ==
The farm house at Hinter Hütten 239, the farm house Ober-Brandösch at Brandösch 14 and the farm house Schmittenhof at Schwithtenhof 11 are listed as Swiss heritage site of national significance. The entire village of Trub is part of the Inventory of Swiss Heritage Sites.

The house at Hinter Hütten 239 still has an example of a hidden room that was used to hide Anabaptists during the centuries that the government of Bern suppressed and attempted to drive them out.

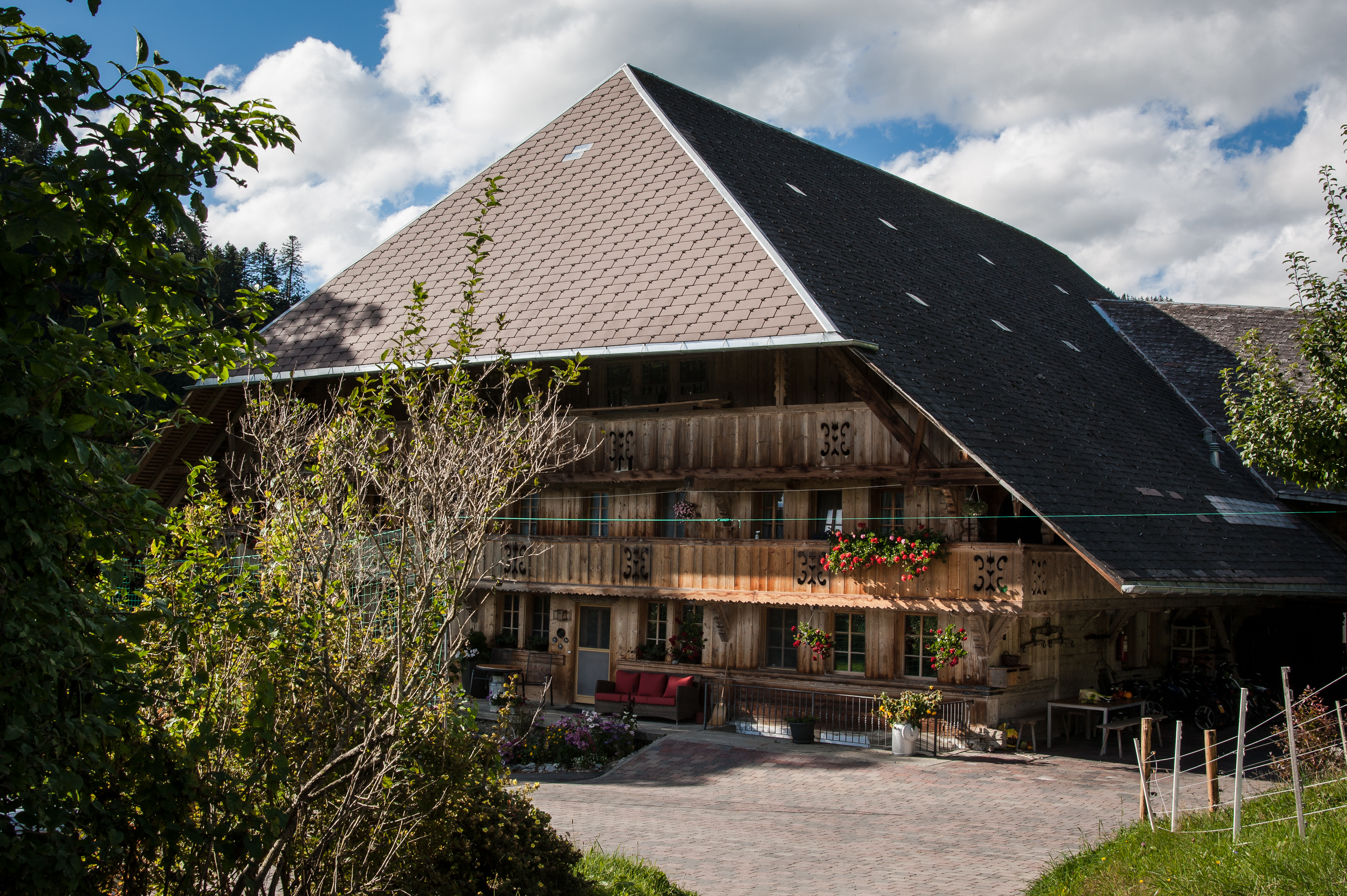
Farm House Ober-Brandösch at Brandösch 146

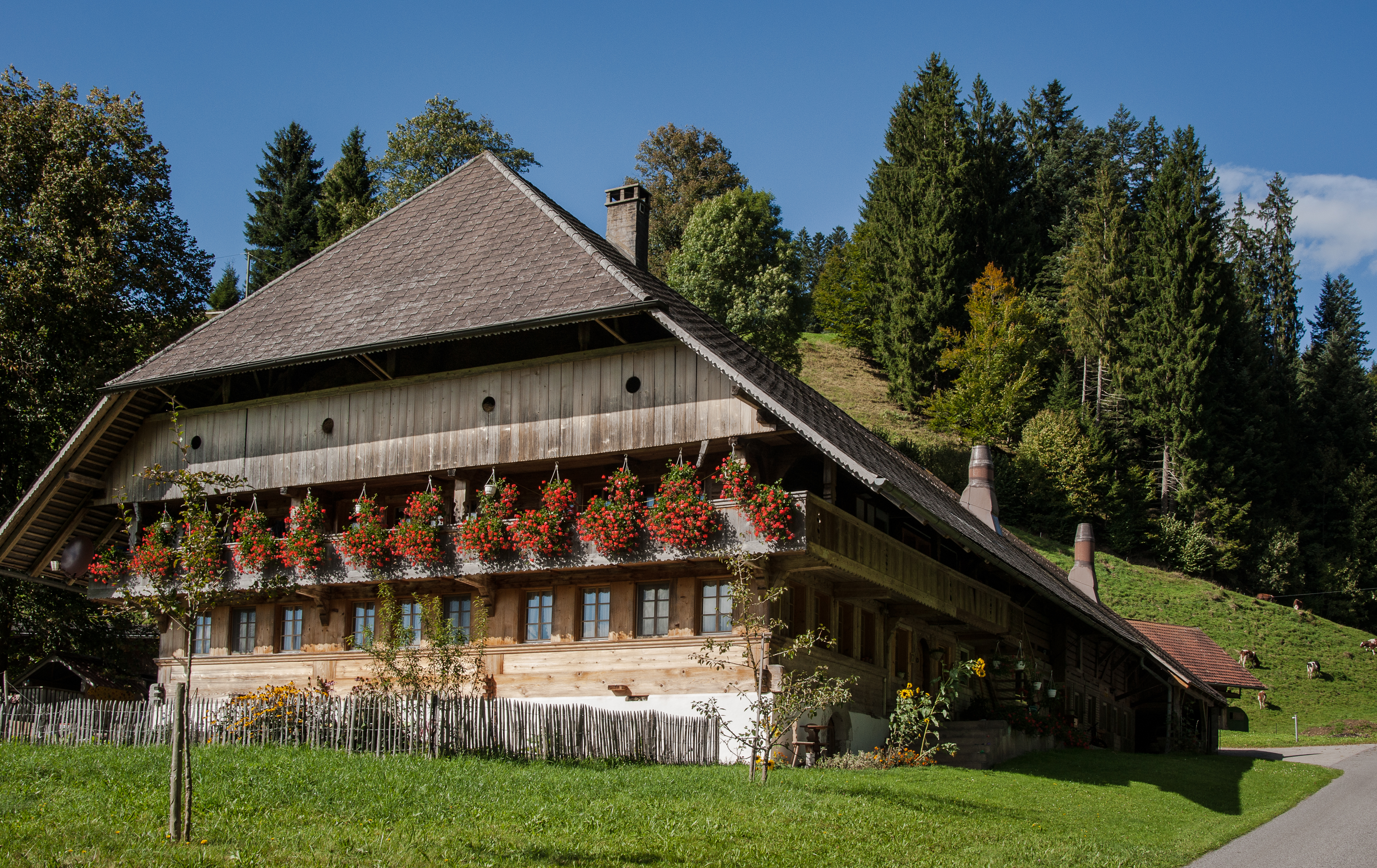
Farm House at Schwithtenhof 11

== Politics ==
In the 2011 federal election the most popular party was the Swiss People's Party (SVP) which received 62.8% of the vote. The next three most popular parties were the Conservative Democratic Party (BDP) (16.7%), the Green Party (7.5%) and the Social Democratic Party (SP) (5.1%). In the federal election, a total of 564 votes were cast, and the voter turnout was 44.8%.

== Religion ==
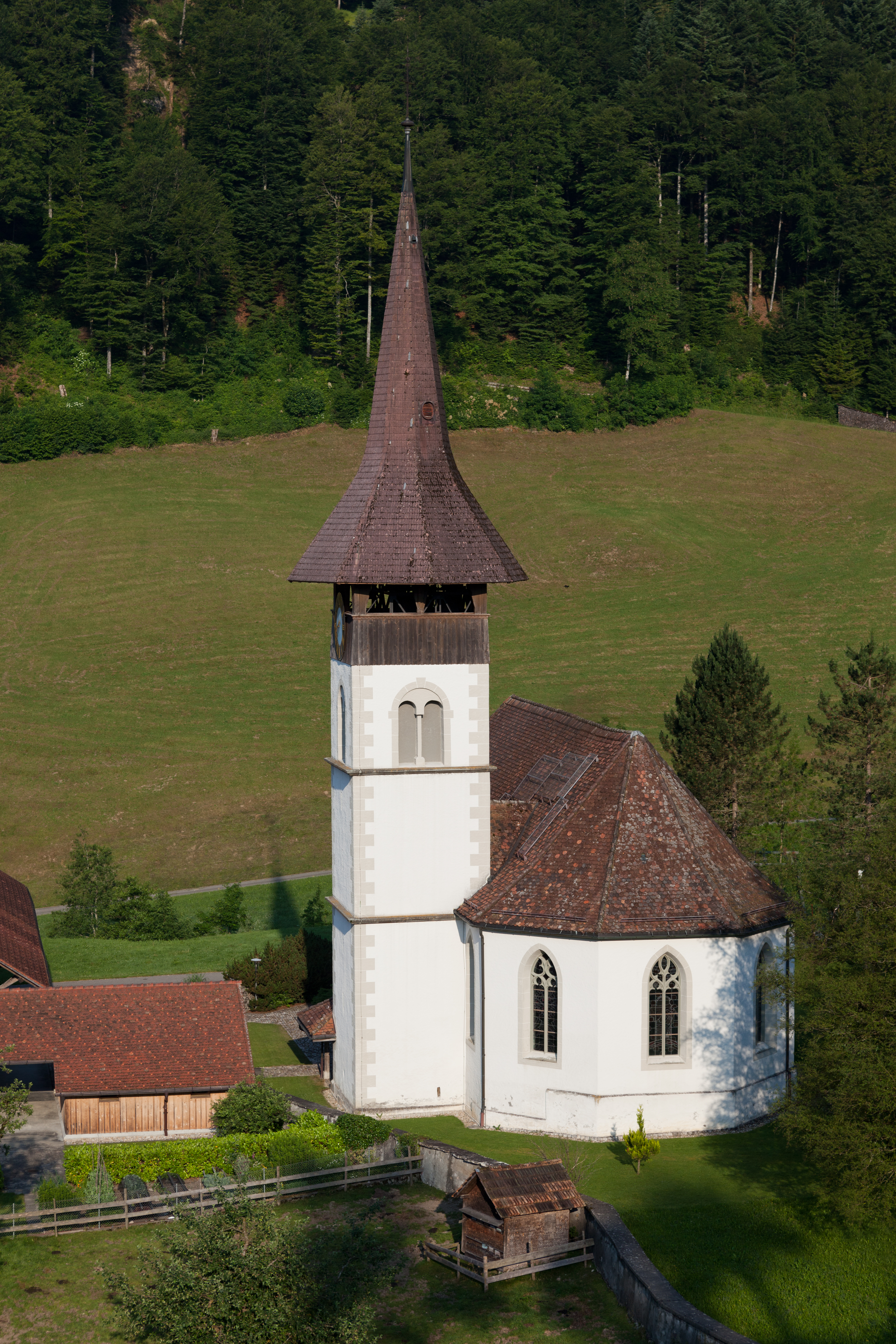
Swiss Reformed church in Trub

From the 2000 census, 1,322 or 87.8% belonged to the Swiss Reformed Church, while 44 or 2.9% were Roman Catholic. Of the rest of the population, there were 4 members of an Orthodox church (or about 0.27% of the population), and there were 34 individuals (or about 2.26% of the population) who belonged to another Christian church. There were 7 (or about 0.46% of the population) who were Muslim. There was 1 person who was Buddhist and 1 person who was Hindu. 29 (or about 1.93% of the population) belonged to no church, are agnostic or atheist, and 64 individuals (or about 4.25% of the population) did not answer the question.

== Education ==
In Trub about 46.5% of the population have completed non-mandatory upper secondary education, and 10.8% have completed additional higher education (either university or a Fachhochschule). Of the 90 who had completed some form of tertiary schooling listed in the census, 78.9% were Swiss men, 14.4% were Swiss women.

The Canton of Bern school system provides one year of non-obligatory Kindergarten, followed by six years of Primary school. This is followed by three years of obligatory lower Secondary school where the students are separated according to ability and aptitude. Following the lower Secondary students may attend additional schooling or they may enter an apprenticeship.

During the 2012–13 school year, there were a total of 142 students attending classes in Trub. There were a total of 20 students in the German language kindergarten classes in the municipality. The municipality's primary school had 91 students in German language classes. Of the primary students, 2.2% were permanent or temporary residents of Switzerland (not citizens) and 7.7% have a different mother language than the classroom language. During the same year, the lower secondary school had a total of 31 students. 3.2% have a different mother language than the classroom language.

As of 2000, there were a total of 281 students attending any school in the municipality. Of those, 181 both lived and attended school in the municipality, while 100 students came from another municipality. During the same year, 88 residents attended schools outside the municipality.

Trub is home to the Gemeindebibliothek Trub (municipal library of Trub). The library has (as of 2008) books or other media, and loaned out items in the same year. It was open a total of 0 days with average of 0 hours per week during that year.

== See also ==
- Kurt Wüthrich
