= 2013 Menznau shooting =

2013 mass shooting at a factory in Menznau, Switzerland

- Menznau (Canton of Lucerne) Menznau (Switzerland)
- Location: 47.0880°N 8.0309°E; Menznau, Canton of Lucerne, Switzerland
- Date: 27 February 2013; 09:00 CET (UTC+01:00)
- Target: Staff from the Kronospan wood-processing plant
- Attack type: Mass shooting, workplace killing
- Weapon: Sphinx model AT380 sub-compact pistol
- Deaths: 5 (including the perpetrator)
- Injuries: 5
- Perpetrator: Viktor Berisha

On 27 February 2013, a gunman opened fire at the Kronospan wood-processing plant in the Swiss town of Menznau, killing four people. Five others were wounded, two critically. The gunman died during a struggle with another worker.

== Shooting ==
The shooting, which took place at approximately 09:00 CET (08:00 UTC), occurred in the canteen area of the Kronospan wood-processing plant in the Swiss town of Menznau. Four were killed and five were wounded, two critically. The wounded were flown to two area hospitals for treatment. Among the victims was Benno Studer (born 29 December 1986), a successful Swiss Wrestler active in competitions since 2007, with notable victories in 2010 and 2011.

The gunman died during a struggle where another worker defended himself by throwing a chair at the gunman, then grabbed him with both arms. During the struggle, the gunman shot himself, although it was not possible to determine whether intentionally or accidentally.

== Perpetrator ==
The gunman was identified as Viktor Berisha (in Swiss media mostly anonymized as "Viktor B.") (Born 1971), aged 42, a Kosovar Albanian who had received asylum in Switzerland in 1991, and who had been convicted of robbery and sentenced to prison in 1998. At some point after 2003, he was naturalized as a Swiss citizen. The weapon used by the perpetrator was a Sphinx Systems model AT380 sub-compact pistol, legally owned by Berisha's brother. Berisha was married and had three children.

== Aftermath ==
The shooting resulted in a debate over Switzerland's gun laws.

== Victims ==
- Thomas M., 44, died on 28 February
- Christina N., 47
- Hans S., 61, died on 4 April
- Benno Studer, 26
