= Tuetisee =

Lake in Menznau, Canton of Lucerne, Switzerland

- Location within Canton of Lucerne Location within Switzerland Location within Alps
- Interactive map of Tuetisee
- Location: Menznau, Canton of Lucerne
- Coordinates: 47°04′19″N 8°03′33″E
- Basin countries: Switzerland
- Surface area: 2.15 ha (5.3 acres)
- Surface elevation: 610 m (2,000 ft)

The Tuetisee, also known as the Tuetensee or Tuetenseeli, is a lake in Menznau, Canton of Lucerne, Switzerland. Its surface area is 2.15 ha. Since 1970, the lake and its surrounding bogs are a nature preserve. In 1984, a military plane suffered a mid-air collision in a military exercise and crash-landed in the lake. Only 12 percent of the plane mass have been recovered.
