= Buttisholz =

- Municipality
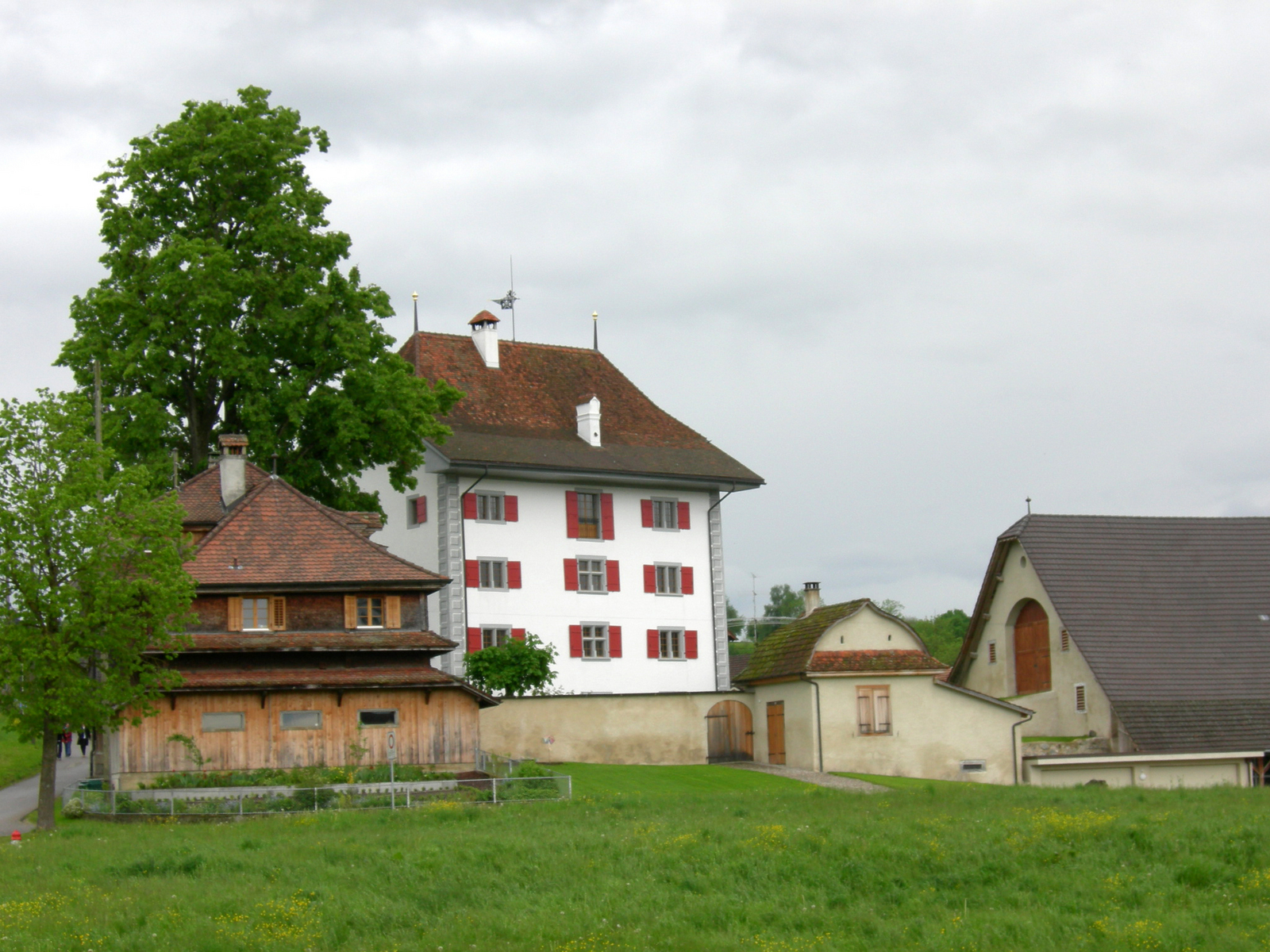

- Coat of arms
- Location of Buttisholz
- Location within Switzerland Location within Canton of Lucerne
- Coordinates: 47°7′N 8°6′E
- Country: Switzerland
- Canton: Lucerne
- District: Sursee

Area
  - Total: 16.77 km^{2} (6.47 sq mi)
- Elevation: 564 m (1,850 ft)

Population (December 2020)
  - Total: 3,322
  - Density: 198.1/km^{2} (513.1/sq mi)
- Time zone: UTC+01:00 (CET)
  - Summer (DST): UTC+02:00 (CEST)
- Postal code: 6018
- SFOS number: 1083
- ISO 3166 code: CH-LU
- Surrounded by: Grosswangen, Menznau, Nottwil, Oberkirch, Ruswil
- Website: www.buttisholz.ch

Buttisholz is a municipality located in the Sursee district of Lucerne, Switzerland.

== History ==
Buttisholz is first mentioned in 1036 as Buttensulza.

== Geography ==
Aerial view (1958)

Buttisholz has an area of 16.8 km^{2} (6.5 sq mi). Of this area, 73.7% is used for agricultural purposes, while 17% is forested. Of the rest of the land, 7.5% is settled (buildings or roads) and the remainder (1.8%) is non-productive (rivers, glaciers or mountains). In the 1997 land survey, 16.99% of the total land area was forested. Of the agricultural land, 68.81% is used for farming or pastures, while 4.89% is used for orchards or vine crops. Of the settled areas, 4% is covered with buildings, 0.66% is industrial, 0.18% is classed as special developments, 0.18% is parks or greenbelts and 2.44% is transportation infrastructure. Of the unproductive areas, 1.43% is unproductive standing water (ponds or lakes), 0.12% is unproductive flowing water (rivers) and 0.3% is other unproductive land.

The municipality is located on the eastern edge of the Rottal. It consists of the village of Buttisholz and the hamlets of Luternau, Soppensee and St. Ottilien.

== Demographics ==
Buttisholz has a population (as of 31 December 2020) of 3,322. As of 2007, 10.3% of the population was made up of foreign nationals. Over the last 10 years the population has grown at a rate of 13.6%. Most of the population (as of 2000) speaks German (93.5%), with Albanian being second most common ( 1.9%) and Italian being third ( 1.4%).

In the 2007 election the most popular party was the CVP which received 47.1% of the vote. The next three most popular parties were the SVP (26.9%), the FDP (16.1%) and the SPS (4.2%).

The age distribution in Buttisholz is; 873 people or 29.5% of the population is 0–19 years old. 796 people or 26.9% are 20–39 years old, and 927 people or 31.3% are 40–64 years old. The senior population distribution is 270 people or 9.1% are 65–79 years old, 84 or 2.8% are 80–89 years old and 14 people or 0.5% of the population are 90+ years old.

The entire Swiss population is generally well educated. In Buttisholz about 73.3% of the population (between age 25–64) have completed either non-mandatory upper secondary education or additional higher education (either University or a Fachhochschule).

As of 2000 there are 896 households, of which 198 households (or about 22.1%) contain only a single individual. 170 or about 19.% are large households, with at least five members. As of 2000 there were 543 inhabited buildings in the municipality, of which 409 were built only as housing, and 134 were mixed use buildings. There were 285 single family homes, 80 double family homes, and 44 multi-family homes in the municipality. Most homes were either two (260) or three (109) story structures. There were only 23 single story buildings and 17 four or more story buildings.

Buttisholz has an unemployment rate of 0.78%. As of 2005, there were 277 people employed in the primary economic sector and about 90 businesses involved in this sector. 493 people are employed in the secondary sector and there are 34 businesses in this sector. 406 people are employed in the tertiary sector, with 63 businesses in this sector. As of 2000 52.5% of the population of the municipality were employed in some capacity. At the same time, females made up 40.8% of the workforce.

In the 2000 census the religious membership of Buttisholz was; 2,315 (86.4%) were Roman Catholic, and 140 (5.2%) were Protestant, with an additional 10 (0.37%) that were of some other Christian faith. There are 71 individuals (2.65% of the population) who are Muslim. Of the rest; there were 2 (0.07%) individuals who belong to another religion, 83 (3.1%) who do not belong to any organized religion, 59 (2.2%) who did not answer the question.

The historical population is given in the following table:

year	population
about 1695	c. 756
1798	1,187
1850	1,860
1900	1,394
1950	1,643
1990	2,449
2000	2,680

== Pictures ==
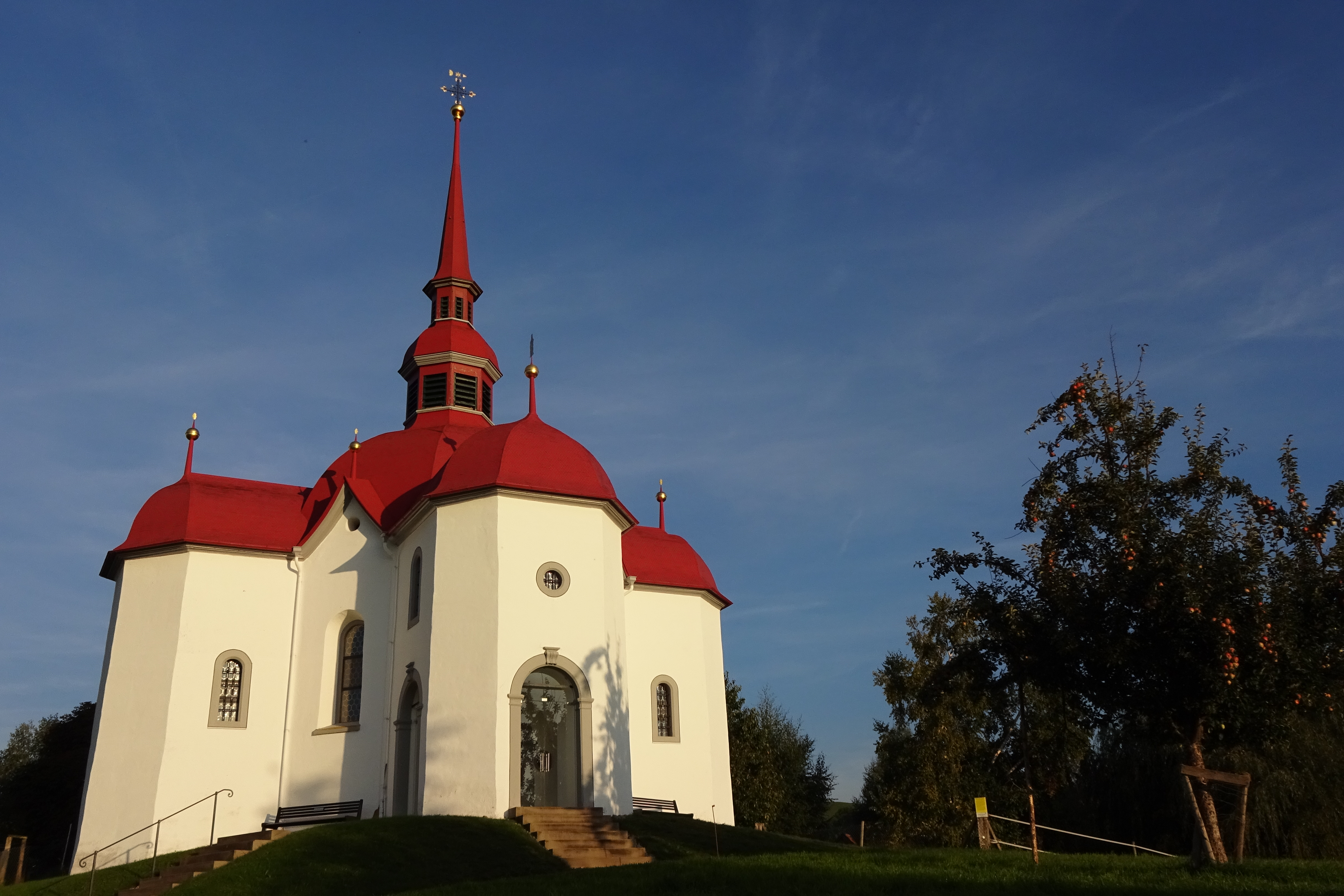
Buttisholz, St. Ottilien – Saint Odile's Pilgrimage Chapel : west façade (main façade)

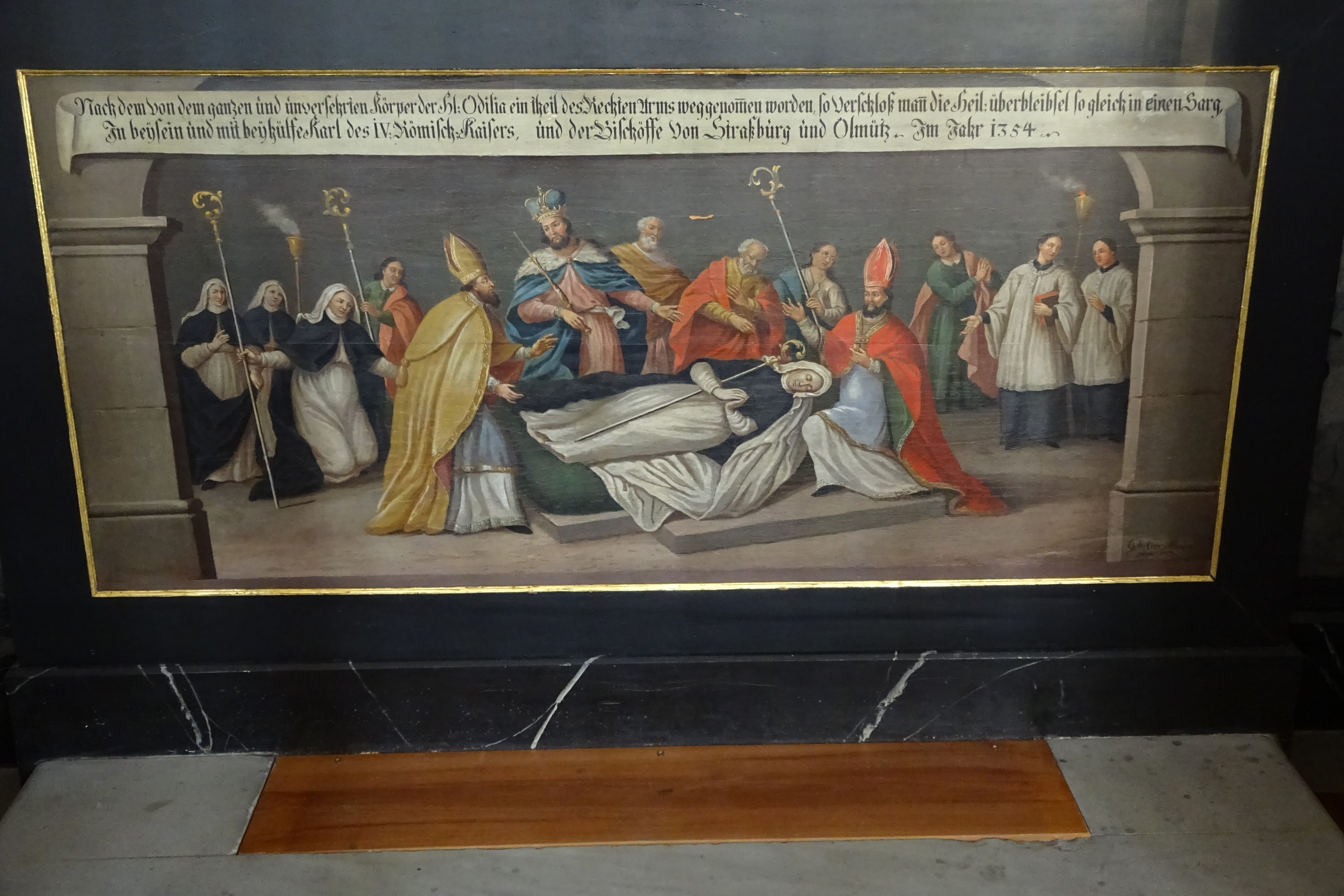
Buttisholz, St. Ottilien – Saint Odile's Pilgrimage Chapel : interior, high altar

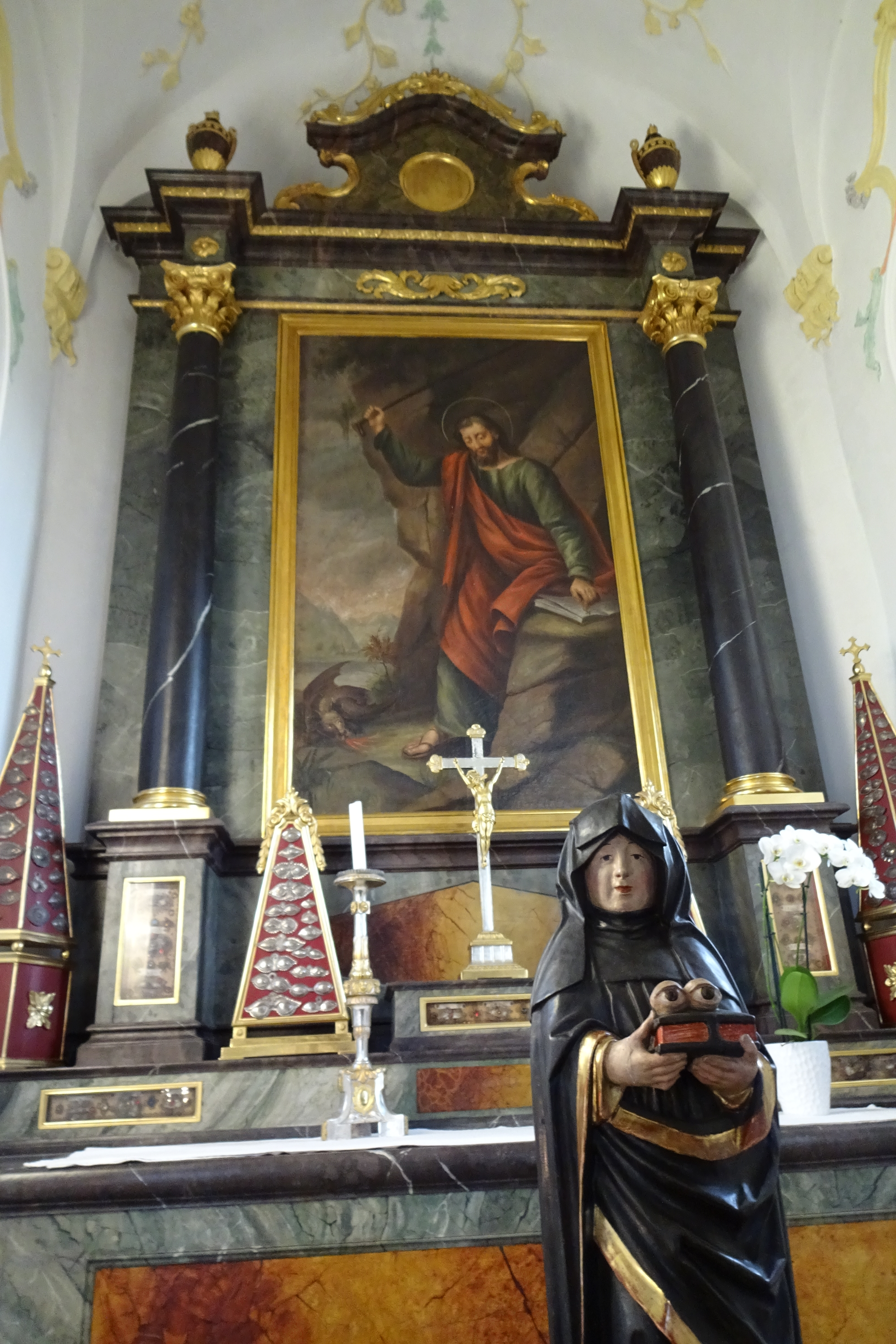
Buttisholz, St. Ottilien – Saint Odile's Pilgrimage Chapel : interior, side chapel

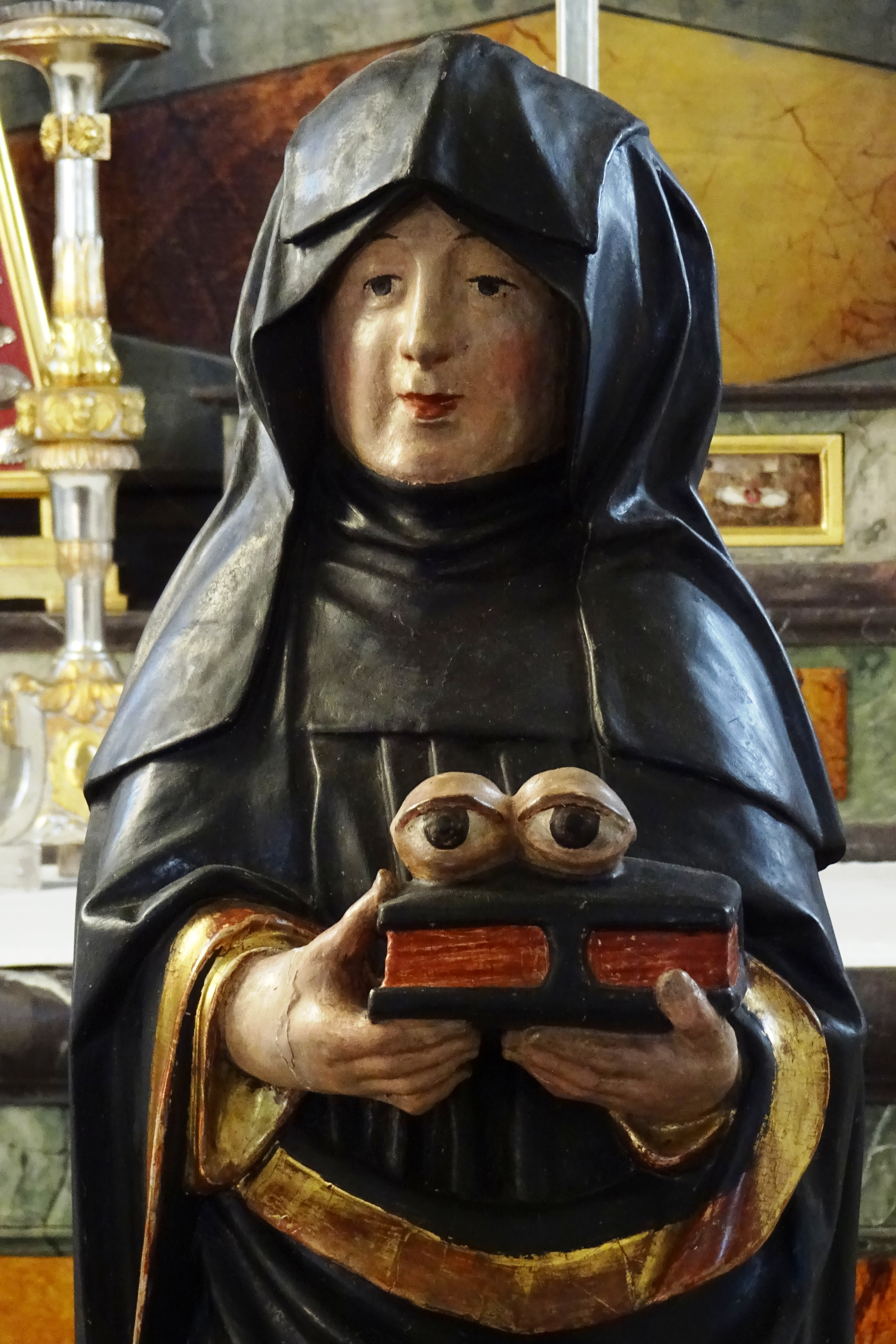
Buttisholz, St. Ottilien – Saint Odile's Pilgrimage Chapel : interior, side chapel, miraculous image of Saint Odile
