= Asuel family =

Medieval Burgundian baronial family

The Asuel family (French: d'Asuel), or Hasenburg family (German: von Hasenburg), was a Burgundian baronial family (Hochfreiengeschlecht) of the 12th to the 15th century, named after Asuel Castle. Its lordship comprised possessions and rights in the northern Jura, mainly in the region between Delémont and Porrentruy, and around Willisau. After the division of the family's estates in 1285, one branch held the ancestral lordship in the Jura and another was founded in Willisau. The Willisau branch died out in the male line around 1341, and the family died out in 1479.

== History ==
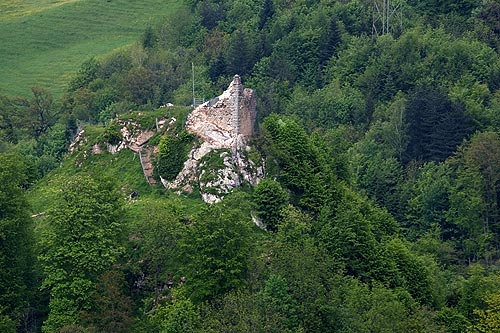
Ruins of Asuel Castle, after which the family was named

The older theory that the family descended from the counts of Fenis is outdated. Instead, its descent from the barons de Montfaucon through a division of inheritance in the 12th century can be assumed. The genealogy is relatively clear over twelve generations, for which almost 50 individuals are attested. The family is first recorded in 1136 with Burchardus (I) and Henricus de Asuel, and it took its name from Asuel Castle. For generations its members were advocates (Kastvögte) of the monastery of Saint-Ursanne and stewards (Truchsessen) of the bishops of Basel. They had ministeriales, among them the de Boncourt, and held the rights of patronage over the churches of Charmoille, Willisau and Menznau. Marriage ties are recorded with the barons of Aarburg and the counts of Thierstein in the 14th century, and with the barons de Rougemont in the 15th century.

While the family had played an influential role in the 12th century, with Hugo among its members, Burkard IV (Bourcard) was so impoverished that in 1241 he had to cede his remaining possessions to the bishop of Basel and receive them back as an episcopal fief. At the beginning of the 13th century the family must have acquired rights in the Willisau region in an unknown way. Until the division of its estates in 1285 it probably held them only as an appurtenance of the Burgundian lordship of Asuel. In that division Diebold (Thiébaud) received the ancestral lordship in the Jura under the Burgundian rule of ultimogeniture; Asuel is described as an outer bailey (Vorburg) in 1324 and as a town in 1377. His brother Heimo II founded the branch in Willisau.

Around 1302 Heimo entered Austrian service, as the Jura branch later did with Ulrich Diebold (Ulrich-Thiébaud). He surrendered Hasenburg Castle, built in the middle of the 13th century, together with the court for minor offenses (Frevelgericht) and the market right, to Habsburg-Austria, to hold them as fiefs, so that he could found the town of Willisau, which he afterwards held at times as a Habsburg pledge. This branch, to which Johannes von Hasenburg, abbot of Einsiedeln from 1327 to 1334, probably belonged, died out in the male line with Markwart around 1341. Through the heiress Ursula, Willisau passed to the house of Aarberg-Valangin.

After 1400, as a result of inheriting part of the lordship of Rougemont, the main interests of the Jura branch shifted to the Burgundian region, where members of the family were in the retinue of Duke Charles the Bold. The family died out with Hans Lütold (Jean-Lutold), who died in 1479.

== Bibliography ==
- A. Bickel, Willisau, vol. 1, 1982, pp. 146–186
- J.-P. Prongué, "Les seigneurs d'Asuel", in Actes de la Société jurassienne d'émulation, 1996, pp. 229–290
