= Wigger (river) =

River in Switzerland

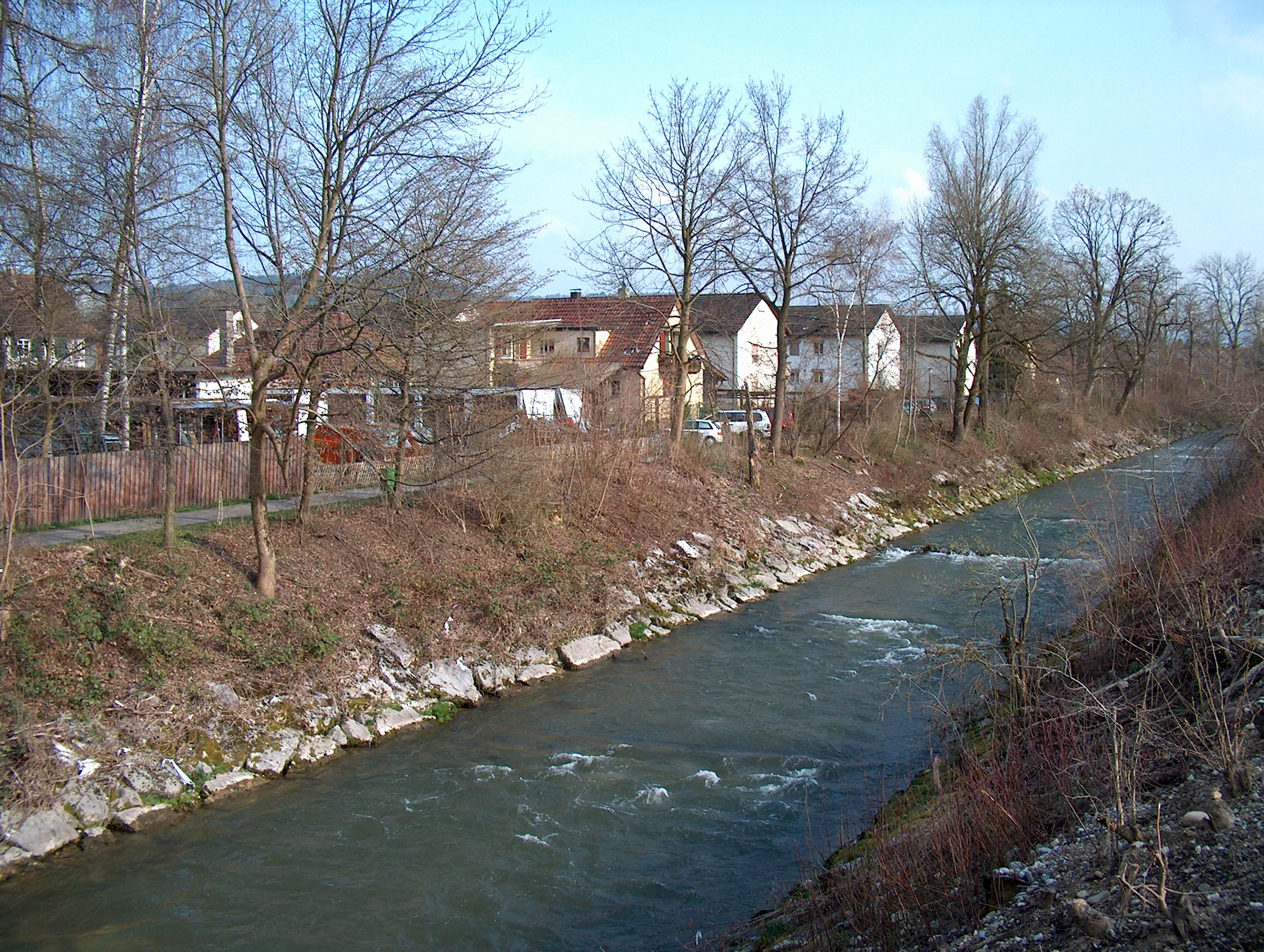
- The Wigger between Zofingen and Strengelbach

Location
- Country: Switzerland

Physical characteristics
- Mouth: Aare
  - coordinates: 47.3156°N 7.8923°E

Basin features
- Progression: Aare→ Rhine→ North Sea

The Wigger (formerly also called Wiggeren) is a river in the Swiss cantons of Lucerne and Aargau. It is an important tributary of the river Aare. The Wigger is around 41 kilometers long and flows from south to north for most of its length. The largest city in the Wigger valley is Zofingen.

The river rises from the north slope of the Napf in the canton of Lucerne near the border to the canton of Bern in a height of about 1300 meters. There it is called Enziwigger. It flows through a narrow valley towards Hergiswil bei Willisau where the valley widens and flattens. Shortly after the small city of Willisau it joins with the Buchwigger and is called just Wigger from there. The valley widens further to a flat and broad plain. North of Dagmersellen the Wigger is mostly restricted to a canal bed and flows partially parallel to the A2 motorway. Between Reiden and Brittnau it crosses the border to Aargau. It flows into the Aar between Rothrist and Aarburg at a height of 395 meters.

Tributaries of the Wigger are the Seewag, the Wanger-Rot, the Ron, the Luthern and the Hürnbach.

In 1821 the Wigger's course was corrected (channelized) by order of the government of the canton of Aargau. Until the second half of the 19th century, the area of the Wigger's confluence with the Aar was a location of placer mining for gold, but this stopped due to dissatisfactory yield.

== See also ==
- List of rivers of Switzerland
