= Luthern =

- Municipality
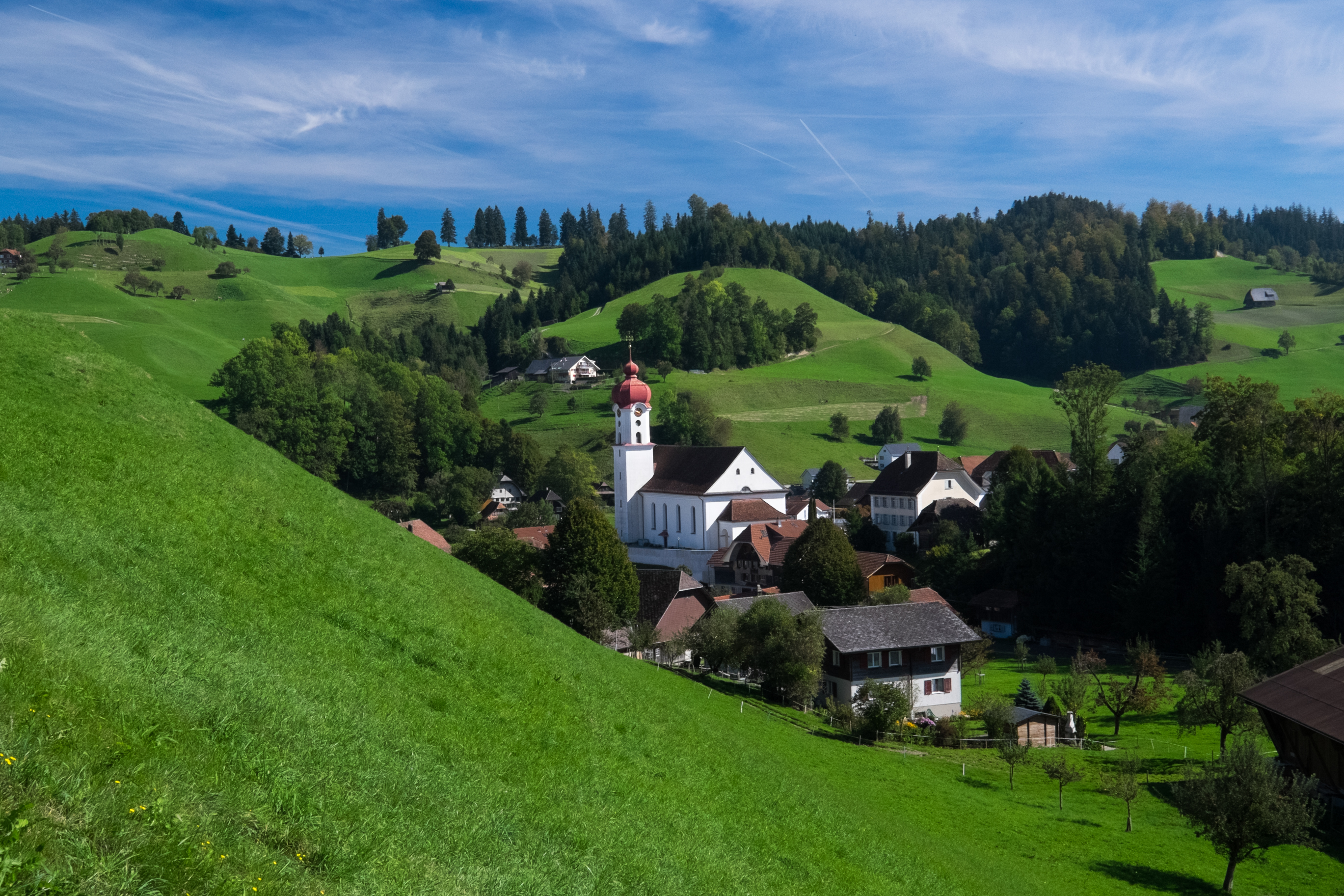

- Coat of arms
- Location of Luthern
- Location within Switzerland Location within Canton of Lucerne
- Coordinates: 47°4′N 7°55′E
- Country: Switzerland
- Canton: Lucerne
- District: Willisau

Area
  - Total: 37.9 km^{2} (14.6 sq mi)
- Elevation: 775 m (2,543 ft)

Population (December 2020)
  - Total: 1,245
  - Density: 32.8/km^{2} (85.1/sq mi)
- Time zone: UTC+01:00 (CET)
  - Summer (DST): UTC+02:00 (CEST)
- Postal code: 6156
- SFOS number: 1135
- ISO 3166 code: CH-LU
- Surrounded by: Eriswil (BE), Hergiswil bei Willisau, Sumiswald (BE), Trub (BE), Ufhusen, Willisau
- Website: www.luthern.ch

Luthern is a municipality in the district of Willisau in the canton of Lucerne in Switzerland.

== History ==
Luthern is first mentioned in 1275 as Lutrun.

== Geography ==
Aerial view (1950)

Luthern has an area, as of 2006, of 37.9 km^{2} (14.6 sq mi). Of this area, 47.8% is used for agricultural purposes, while 47.6% is forested. Of the rest of the land, 3.5% is settled (buildings or roads) and the remainder (1.1%) is non-productive (rivers, glaciers or mountains). In the 1997 land survey, 47.49% of the total land area was forested. Of the agricultural land, 46.83% is used for farming or pastures, while 1.01% is used for orchards or vine crops. Of the settled areas, 1.56% is covered with buildings, 0.16% is industrial, 0.4% is classed as special developments, 0.03% is parks or greenbelts and 1.4% is transportation infrastructure. Of the unproductive areas, 0.61% is unproductive flowing water (rivers) and 0.53% is other unproductive land.

The municipality is located in the upper Luthern valley, in the northern Napfgebiet. It consists of the village of Luthern and the hamlets of Luthernbad, Hofstatt and Flühlen as well as scattered farm houses.

== Demographics ==
Luthern has a population (as of 31 December 2020) of 1,245. As of 2007, 29 or about 2.1% are not Swiss citizens. Over the last 10 years the population has decreased at a rate of -13.7%. Most of the population (as of 2000) speaks German (98.5%), with Portuguese being second most common ( 0.7%) and Albanian being third ( 0.6%).

In the 2007 election the most popular party was the CVP which received 65.2% of the vote. The next three most popular parties were the SVP (17.7%), the FDP (12.8%) and the Green Party (2.2%).

The age distribution, as of 2008, in Luthern is; 375 people or 27.4% of the population is 0–19 years old. 332 people or 24.3% are 20–39 years old, and 417 people or 30.5% are 40–64 years old. The senior population distribution is 170 people or 12.4% are 65–79 years old, 66 or 4.8% are 80–89 years old and 9 people or 0.7% of the population are 90+ years old.

The entire Swiss population is generally well educated. In Luthern about 51.4% of the population (between age 25-64) have completed either non-mandatory upper secondary education or additional higher education (either university or a Fachhochschule).

As of 2000 there are 438 households, of which 84 households (or about 19.2%) contain only a single individual. 106 or about 24.2% are large households, with at least five members. As of 2000 there were 303 inhabited buildings in the municipality, of which 128 were built only as housing, and 175 were mixed use buildings. There were 84 single family homes, 23 double family homes, and 21 multi-family homes in the municipality. Most homes were either two (77) or three (29) story structures. There were only 10 single story buildings and 12 four or more story buildings.

Luthern has an unemployment rate of 0.4%. As of 2005, there were 358 people employed in the primary economic sector and about 140 businesses involved in this sector. 134 people are employed in the secondary sector and there are 22 businesses in this sector. 191 people are employed in the tertiary sector, with 28 businesses in this sector. As of 2000 48.4% of the population of the municipality were employed in some capacity. At the same time, females made up 37.5% of the workforce.

In the 2000 census the religious membership of Luthern was; 1,263 (83.1%) were Roman Catholic, and 173 (11.4%) were Protestant, with an additional 8 (0.53%) that were of some other Christian faith. There are 5 individuals (0.33% of the population) who are Muslim. Of the rest; there were 13 (0.86%) who do not belong to any organized religion, 58 (3.82%) who did not answer the question.

The historical population is given in the following table:

year	population
about 1695	ca. 600
1798	1,624
1850	2,002
1900	1,702
1950	1,977
2000	1,520

== Weather ==
Luthern has an average of 145.1 days of rain or snow per year and on average receives 1,478 mm (58.2 in) of precipitation. The wettest month is June during which time Luthern receives an average of 154 mm (6.1 in) of precipitation over an average of 12.2 days. The month with the most days of precipitation is May, with an average of 14.5, but with only 151 mm (5.9 in) of precipitation. The driest month of the year is February with an average of 97 mm (3.8 in) of precipitation over 11.6 days.

== Gallery ==
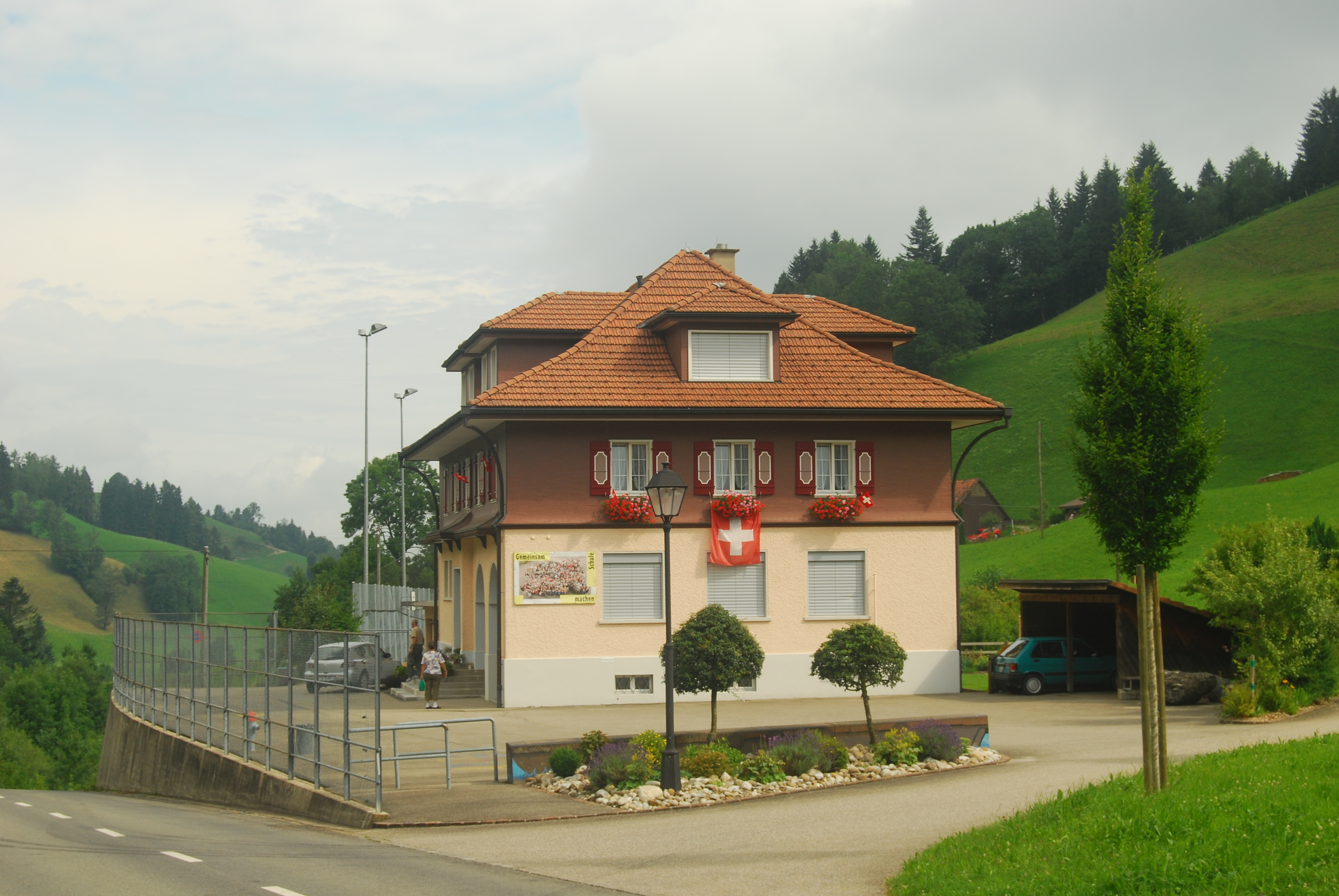
Former school building

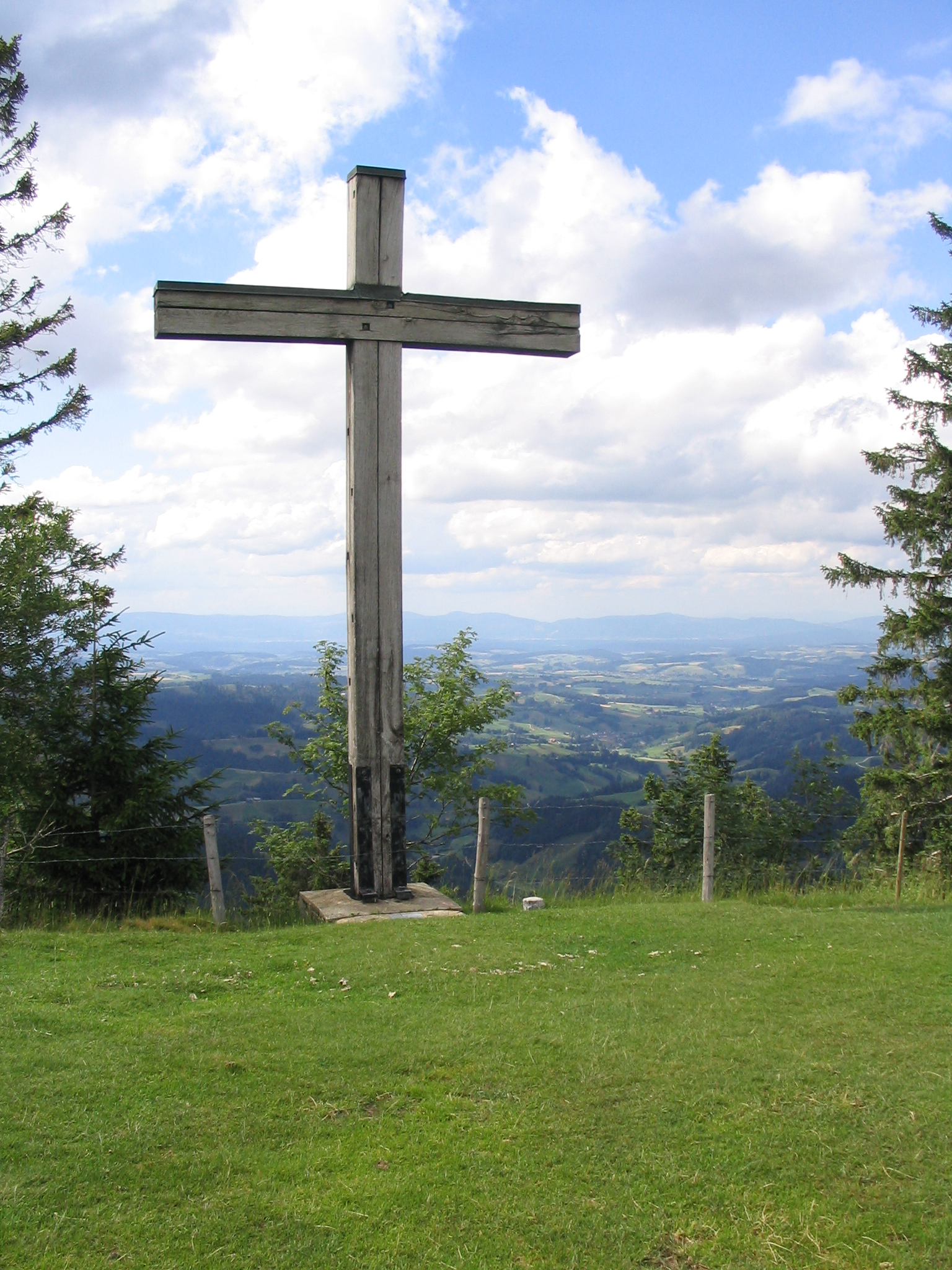
Blick from Napf

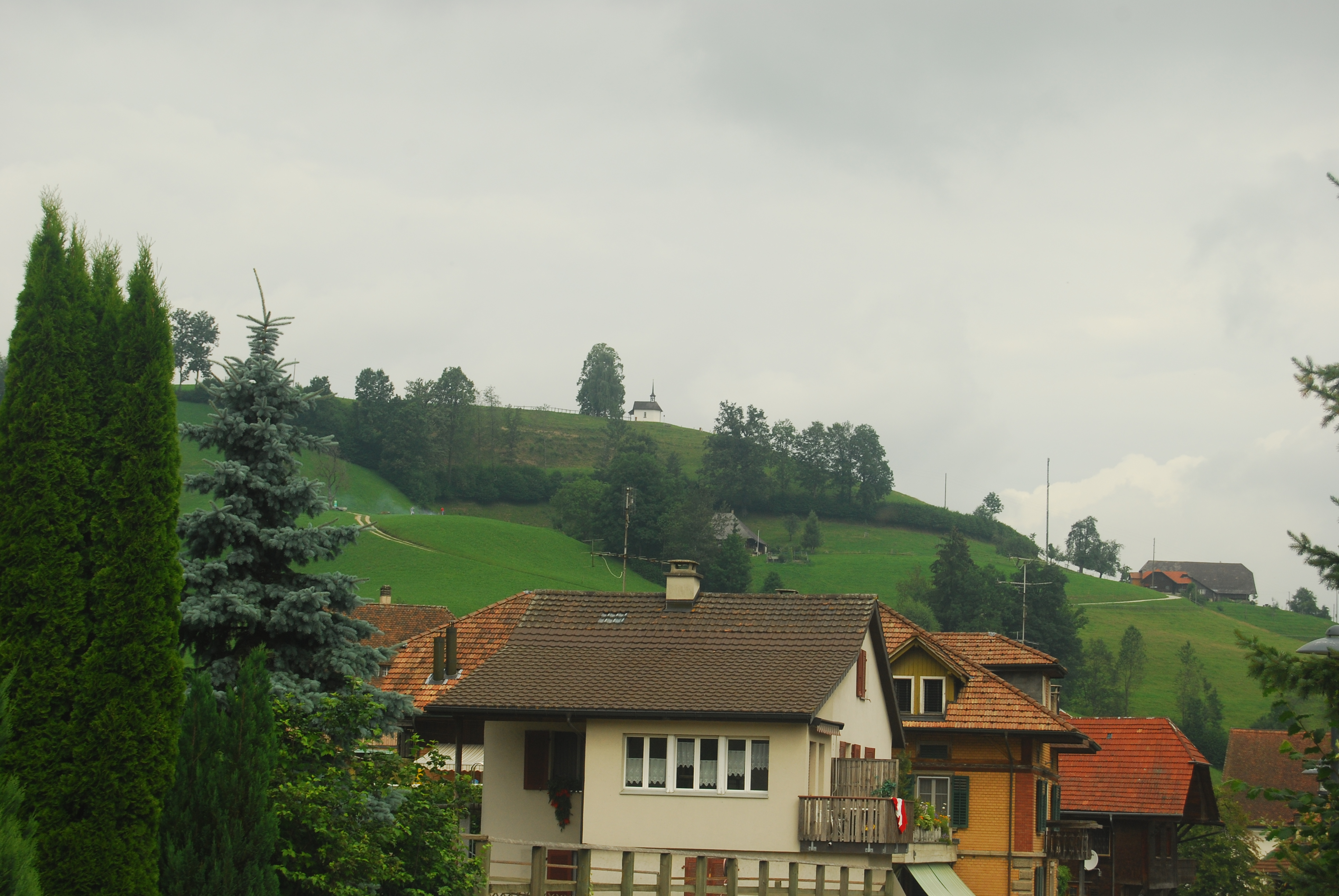
Chapel Heubärg

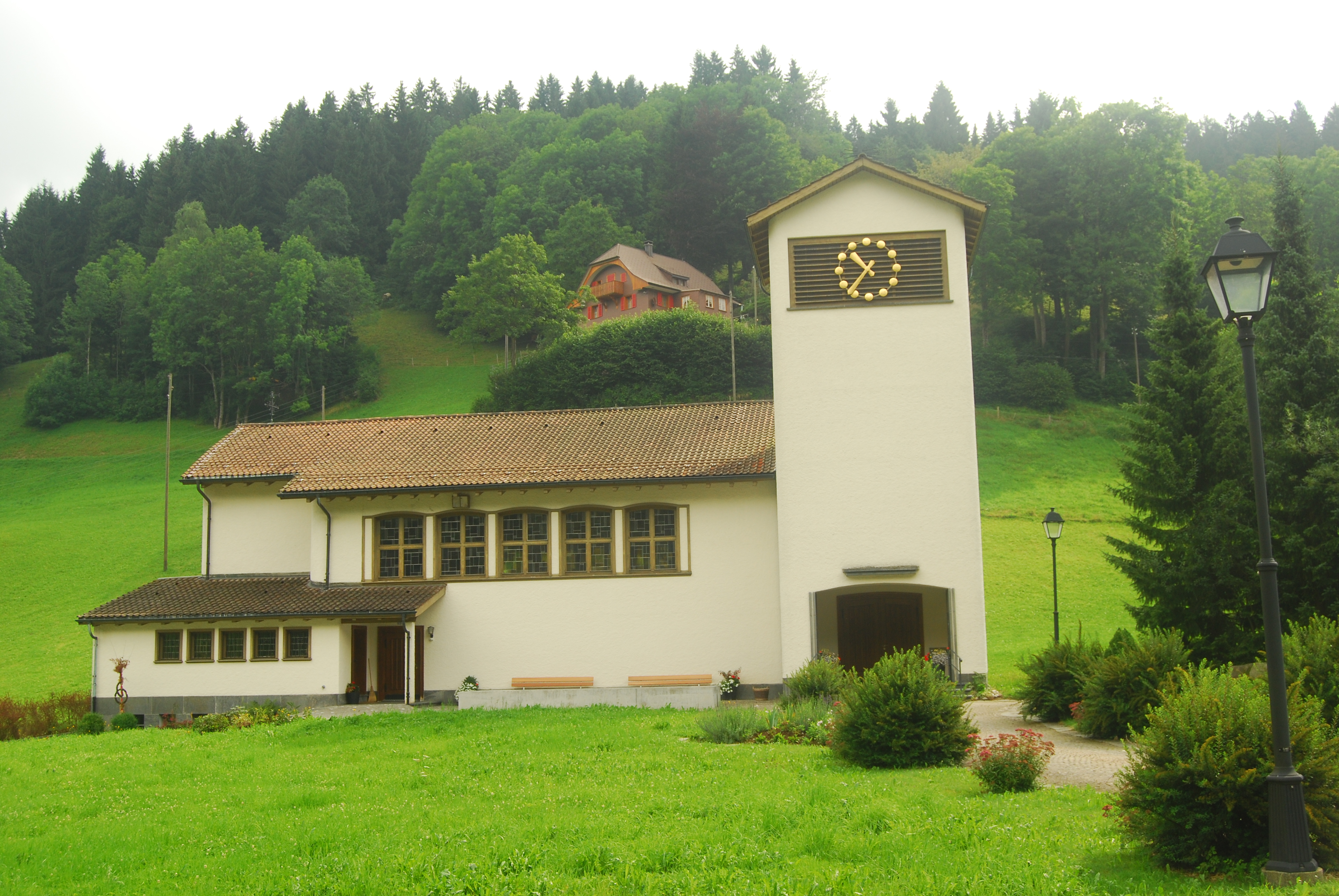
Pilgrimage Church Maria-Heilbronn

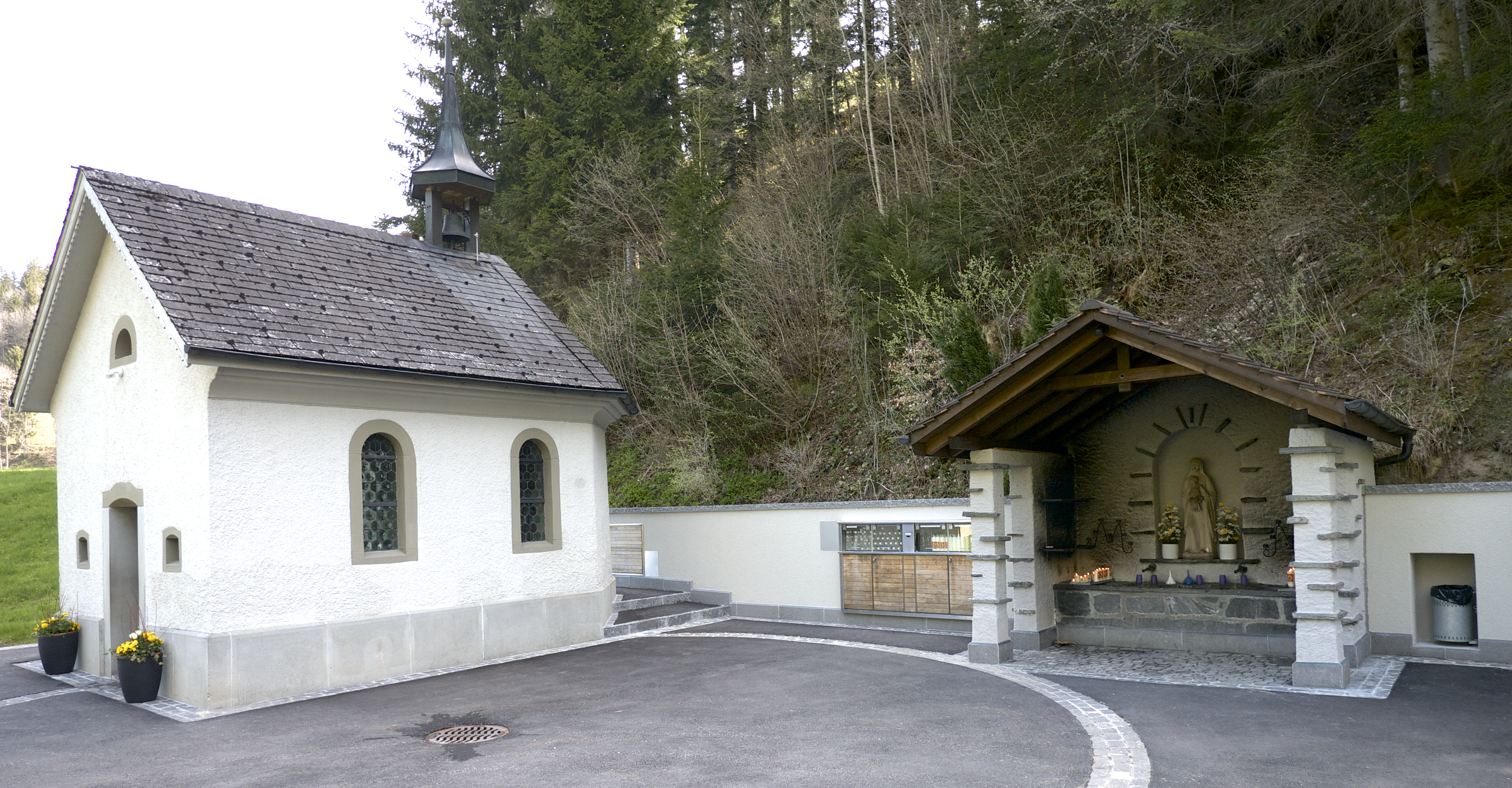
Pilgrimage Chapel (Badbrünnlikapelle)

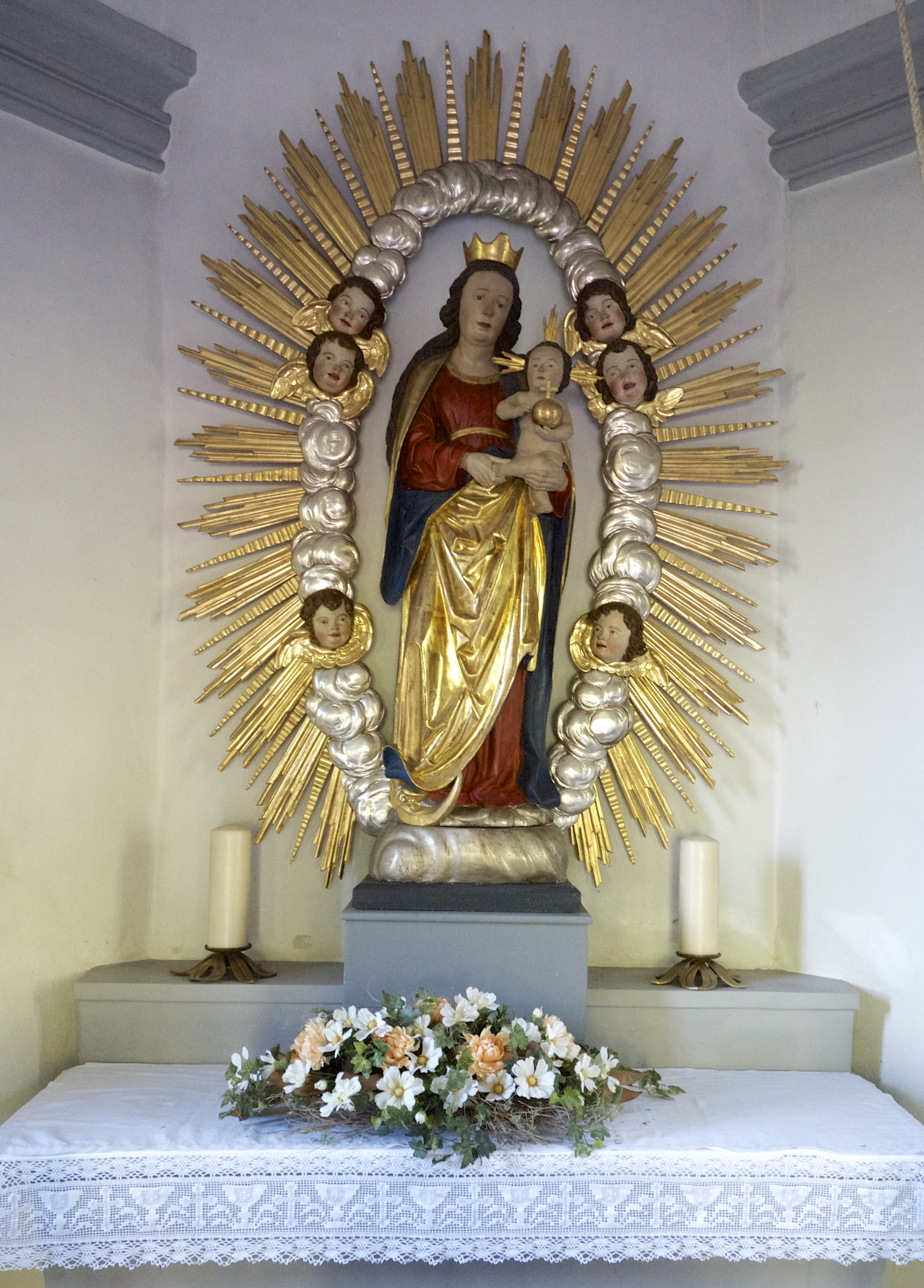
Pilgrimage Chapel (Badbrünnlikapelle)

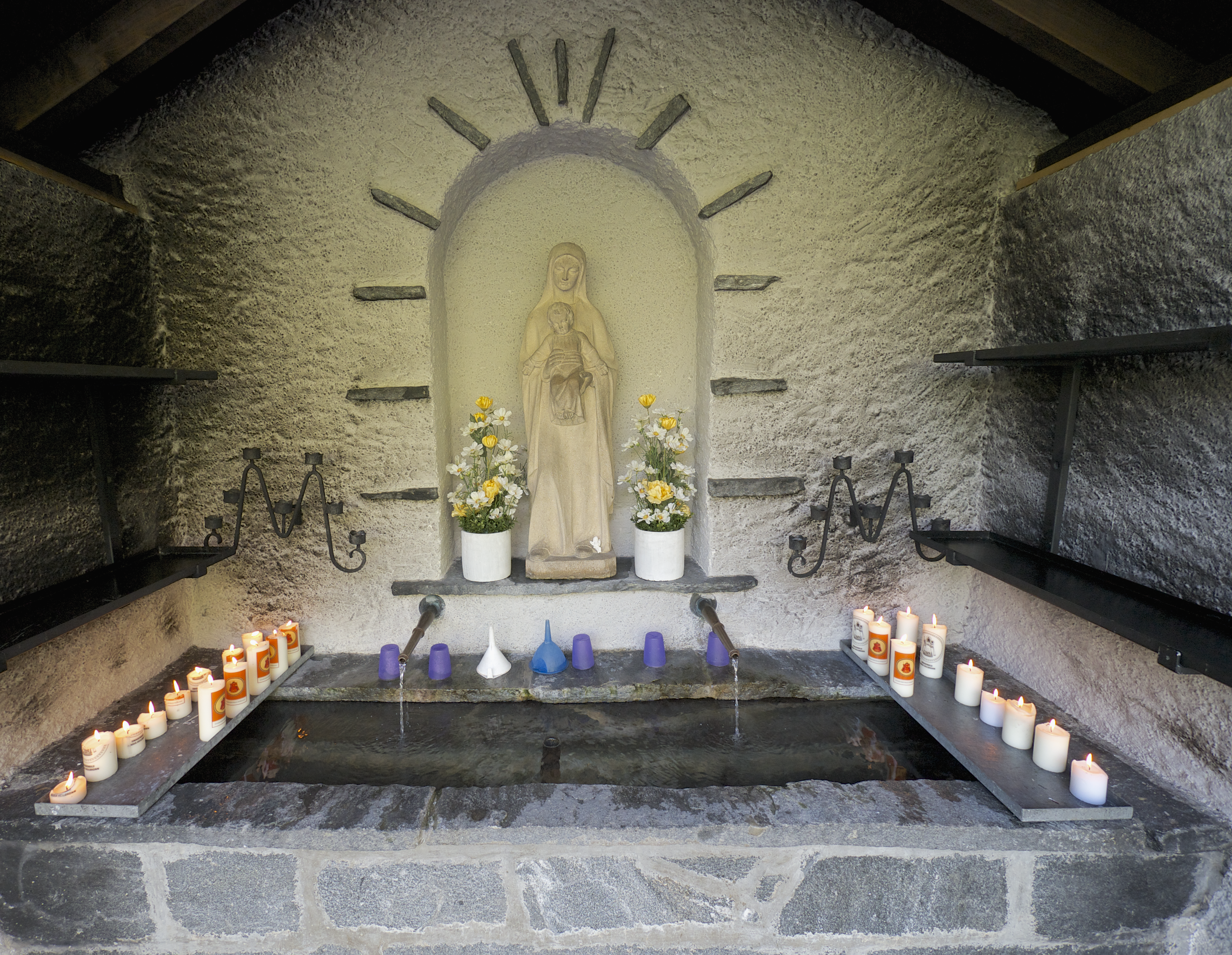
Fountain Badbrünnli
