= Anabaptist hunters =

Anabaptist hunters (German: Täuferjäger) were armed envoys used by some cantons of the Old Swiss Confederacy and Holy Roman Empire in order to drive out or suppress the local Anabaptist population (Swiss Brethren). In Lower Austria, Dietrich von Hartitsch was hired as a professional Anabaptist hunter by Emperor Ferdinand. In 1539 he captured 136 Anabaptists, many of whom were sold as galley slaves to Admiral Andrea Doria.

== Practices ==
When the hunters captured an Anabaptist, the Anabaptist's lands would be confiscated and they would generally be executed for nonconformism. Ferdinand I, Holy Roman Emperor decreed that all Anabaptists were to be put to death. The decree stated that if the Anabaptist did not recant they would be suffer death by burning, if they did recant then they would be beheaded. Anabaptist hunting was common within the Archduchy of Austria as they were encouraged Ferdinand I. If any Anabaptists were caught, the hunters would be rewarded by being paid 32 Guilders for each one captured. These hunts would continue for centuries however the populace eventually became tired of them to the point that by 1702, when Anabaptist hunts were announced by the Anabaptist Commission, the people would assist Anabaptists to escape. This was because the hunters were generally mercenaries who had no ties to the areas they were operating in. The Anabaptist hunters' tactics would result in Anabaptists meeting on mountains or in caves and forests to evade them.

Anabaptist hunters would often act as a secret police force, utilising intelligence about secret meetings. However they often tended not to go out searching for Anabaptists in bad weather. Anabaptist hunters were not always knowledgeable about the Anabaptists they were looking for. A story once reported that Anabaptist hunters once stopped a coach driven by Menno Simons looking for him. When they asked him if "Menno" was in the coach, Simons responded in the negative. Thus bypassing the hunters without bearing false witness.
