= Menznau =

- Municipality
- Coat of arms
- Location of Menznau
- Location within Switzerland Location within Canton of Lucerne
- Coordinates: 47°05′N 8°02′E
- Country: Switzerland
- Canton: Lucerne
- District: Willisau

Area
  - Total: 30.42 km^{2} (11.75 sq mi)
- Elevation: 600 m (2,000 ft)

Population (December 2020)
  - Total: 2,966
  - Density: 97.50/km^{2} (252.5/sq mi)
- Time zone: UTC+01:00 (CET)
  - Summer (DST): UTC+02:00 (CEST)
- Postal code: 6122-6125
- SFOS number: 1136
- ISO 3166 code: CH-LU
- Surrounded by: Buttisholz, Grosswangen, Hergiswil bei Willisau, Romoos, Ruswil, Willisau, Wolhusen
- Website: www.menznau.ch

Menznau is a municipality in the district of Willisau in the canton of Lucerne in Switzerland.

== History ==
Menznau is first mentioned in 1185 as Menzenowa.

On February 27, 2013, a gunman opened fire in a Kronospan wood-processing plant, killing four.

== Geography ==
Aerial view from 300 m by Walter Mittelholzer (1922)

Menznau has an area, as of 2006, of 30.4 km^{2} (11.7 sq mi). Of this area, 59.3% is used for agricultural purposes, while 34.7% is forested. Of the rest of the land, 5.4% is settled (buildings or roads) and the remainder (0.6%) is non-productive (rivers, glaciers or mountains). In the 1997 land survey, 34.71% of the total land area was forested. Of the agricultural land, 56.38% is used for farming or pastures, while 2.79% is used for orchards or vine crops. Of the settled areas, 2.3% is covered with buildings, 0.62% is industrial, 0.33% is classed as special developments, 0.13% is parks or greenbelts and 2.01% is transportation infrastructure. Of the unproductive areas, 0.1% is unproductive standing water (ponds or lakes), 0.39% is unproductive flowing water (rivers) and 0.23% is other unproductive land.

It consists of the village sections of Menznau, Geiss and Menzberg. The municipality's lake, the Tuetenseeli, and its bog are a nature preserve.

== Demographics ==
Menznau has a population (as of 31 December 2020) of 2,966. As of 2007, 189 or about 6.8% are not Swiss citizens. Over the last 10 years the population has decreased at a rate of -3.1%. Most of the population (as of 2000) speaks German (94.0%), with Albanian being second most common ( 2.9%) and Serbo-Croatian being third ( 1.3%).

In the 2007 election the most popular party was the CVP which received 45.3% of the vote. The next three most popular parties were the SVP (25.7%), the FDP (21.2%) and the Green Party (3.2%).

The age distribution, as of 2008, in Menznau is; 767 people or 27.7% of the population is 0–19 years old. 728 people or 26.3% are 20–39 years old, and 916 people or 33.1% are 40–64 years old. The senior population distribution is 264 people or 9.5% are 65–79 years old, 67 or 2.4% are 80–89 years old and 29 people or 1% of the population are 90+ years old.

In Menznau about 58.7% of the population (between age 25-64) have completed either non-mandatory upper secondary education or additional higher education (either university or a Fachhochschule).

As of 2000 there are 929 households, of which 215 households (or about 23.1%) contain only a single individual. 174 or about 18.7% are large households, with at least five members. As of 2000 there were 519 inhabited buildings in the municipality, of which 289 were built only as housing, and 230 were mixed use buildings. There were 176 single family homes, 54 double family homes, and 59 multi-family homes in the municipality. Most homes were either two (144) or three (102) story structures. There were only 18 single story buildings and 25 four or more story buildings.

Menznau has an unemployment rate of 1.02%. As of 2005, there were 392 people employed in the primary economic sector and about 133 businesses involved in this sector. 648 people are employed in the secondary sector and there are 34 businesses in this sector. 487 people are employed in the tertiary sector, with 63 businesses in this sector. As of 2000 51.3% of the population of the municipality were employed in some capacity. At the same time, females made up 38.9% of the workforce.

In the 2000 census the religious membership of Menznau was; 2,389 (83.8%) were Roman Catholic, and 212 (7.4%) were Protestant, with an additional 13 (0.46%) that were of some other Christian faith. There are 64 individuals (2.25% of the population) who are Muslim. Of the rest; there were 11 (0.39%) individuals who belong to another religion (not listed), 47 (1.65%) who do not belong to any organized religion, 114 (4.%) who did not answer the question.

The historical population is given in the following table:

Year	Population
c. 1695	c. 650^{a}
1798	1,894
1837	2,402
1850	2,337
1900	1,906
1950	2,410
1970	2,185
2000	2,850

^a Geiss had a population of about 85.
