= Municipalities of the canton of Lucerne =

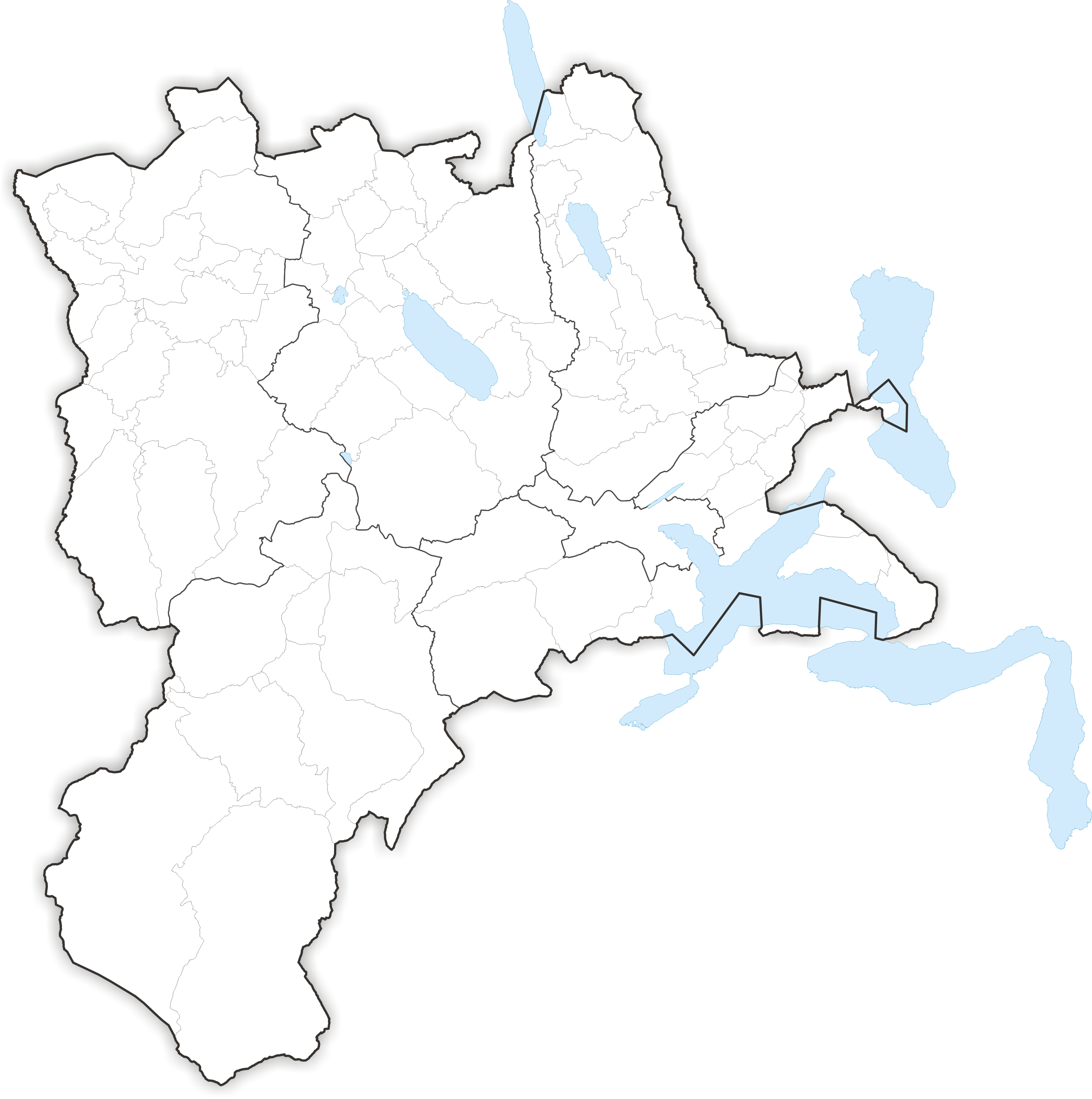
Municipalities in the canton of Lucerne

The following are the 79 municipalities of the canton of Lucerne, Switzerland (as of January 2025).

== List ==
- Adligenswil
- Aesch
- Alberswil
- Altbüron
- Altishofen
- Ballwil
- Beromünster
- Buchrain
- Büron
- Buttisholz
- Dagmersellen
- Dierikon
- Doppleschwand
- Ebikon
- Egolzwil
- Eich
- Emmen
- Entlebuch
- Ermensee
- Eschenbach
- Escholzmatt-Marbach
- Ettiswil
- Fischbach
- Flühli
- Geuensee
- Gisikon
- Greppen
- Grossdietwil
- Grosswangen
- Hasle
- Hergiswil bei Willisau
- Hildisrieden
- Hitzkirch
- Hochdorf
- Hohenrain
- Horw
- Inwil
- Knutwil
- Kriens
- Luthern
- Luzern
- Malters
- Mauensee
- Meggen
- Meierskappel
- Menznau
- Nebikon
- Neuenkirch
- Nottwil
- Oberkirch
- Pfaffnau
- Rain
- Reiden
- Rickenback
- Roggliswil
- Römerswil
- Romoos
- Root
- Rothenburg
- Ruswil
- Schenkon
- Schlierbach
- Schongau
- Schötz
- Schüpfheim
- Schwarzenberg
- Sempach
- Sursee
- Triengen
- Udligenswil
- Ufhusen
- Vitznau
- Wauwil
- Weggis
- Werthenstein
- Wikon
- Willisau
- Wolhusen
- Zell

== See also ==
- Category:Former municipalities of the canton of Lucerne
