= Lichtsteiner =

Lichtsteiner is a Swiss surname. Notable people with the surname include

- Alois Lichtsteiner (born 1950), Swiss painter
- Markus Lichtsteiner (born 1973), Swiss footballer
- Stephan Lichtsteiner (born 1984), Swiss footballer
