= Ohmstal =

- Former municipality
- Coat of arms
- Location of Ohmstal
- Location within Switzerland Location within Canton of Lucerne
- Coordinates: 47°10′N 7°57′E
- Country: Switzerland
- Canton: Lucerne
- District: Willisau

Area
  - Total: 4.48 km^{2} (1.73 sq mi)
- Elevation: 627 m (2,057 ft)

Population (Dec 2010)
  - Total: 312
  - Density: 69.6/km^{2} (180/sq mi)
- Time zone: UTC+01:00 (CET)
  - Summer (DST): UTC+02:00 (CEST)
- Postal code: 6143
- SFOS number: 1138
- ISO 3166 code: CH-LU
- Surrounded by: Ebersecken, Gettnau, Grossdietwil, Schötz, Zell
- Website: www.ohmstal.ch

Ohmstal is a former municipality in the district of Willisau in the canton of Lucerne in Switzerland. On 1 January 2013 the former municipality of Ohmstal merged into the municipality of Schötz.

== History ==
Ohmstal is first mentioned around 1150 as Omistal. In the 15th to 17th Centuries it was known as Amanstal.

== Geography ==
Before the merger, Ohmstal had a total area of 4.5 km^{2} (1.7 mi^{2}). Of this area, 67.9% is used for agricultural purposes, while 26.6% is forested. Of the rest of the land, 4.9% is settled (buildings or roads) and the remainder (0.7%) is non-productive rivers. In the 1997 land survey, 26.56% of the total land area was forested. Of the agricultural land, 65.63% is used for farming or pastures, while 2.23% is used for orchards or vine crops. Of the settled areas, 2.23% is covered with buildings, 0.22% is industrial, 0.22% is classed as special developments, 0.22% is parks or greenbelts and 2.01% is transportation infrastructure.

The former municipality is located on the left sided of the Luthern river valley.

== Demographics ==
Ohmstal had a population (as of 2010) of 312. As of 2007, 19 or about 6.0% are not Swiss citizens. Over the last 10 years the population has decreased at a rate of -0.6%. Most of the population (as of 2000) speaks German (98.7%), with Portuguese being second most common ( 0.9%) and French being third ( 0.3%).

In the 2007 election the most popular party was the CVP which received 45.1% of the vote. The next three most popular parties were the SVP (26.2%), the FDP (16.2%) and the Green Party (6.5%).

The age distribution, as of 2008, in Ohmstal is; 77 people or 24.2% of the population is 0–19 years old. 81 people or 25.5% are 20–39 years old, and 115 people or 36.2% are 40–64 years old. The senior population distribution is 31 people or 9.7% are 65–79 years old, 11 or 3.5% are 80–89 years old and 3 people or 0.9% of the population are 90+ years old.

In Ohmstal about 73% of the population (between age 25-64) have completed either non-mandatory upper secondary education or additional higher education (either university or a Fachhochschule).

As of 2000 there are 102 households, of which 16 households (or about 15.7%) contain only a single individual. 22 or about 21.6% are large households, with at least five members. As of 2000 there were 68 inhabited buildings in the municipality, of which 42 were built only as housing, and 26 were mixed use buildings. There were 29 single family homes, 9 double family homes, and 4 multi-family homes in the municipality. Most homes were either two (29) or three (7) story structures. There were only 3 single story buildings and 3 four or more story buildings.

Ohmstal has an unemployment rate of 0.68%. As of 2005, there were 66 people employed in the primary economic sector and about 22 businesses involved in this sector. 26 people are employed in the secondary sector and there are 4 businesses in this sector. 22 people are employed in the tertiary sector, with 9 businesses in this sector. As of 2000 52.7% of the population of the municipality were employed in some capacity. At the same time, females made up 37.7% of the workforce.

In the 2000 census the religious membership of Ohmstal was; 249 (78.5%) were Roman Catholic, and 46 (14.5%) were Protestant. Of the rest; there were 20 (6.31%) who do not belong to any organized religion, 2 (0.63%) who did not answer the question.

The historical population is given in the following table:

year	population
1798	233
1850	416
1900	283
1950	297
2000	317
