= Bailiff's Castle (Willisau) =

Swiss castle

Coordinates: 47°07′10″N 7°59′26″E

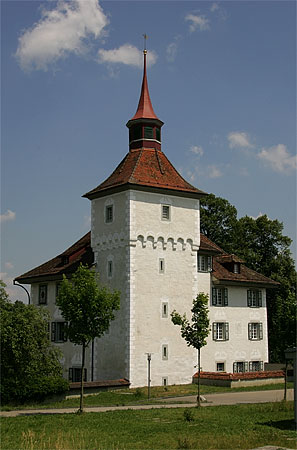
Landvogteischloss

The Bailiff's Castle (German: Landvogteischloss) is a castle in the municipality of Willisau of the Canton of Lucerne in Switzerland. It is a Swiss heritage site of national significance.

== See also ==
- List of castles in Switzerland
