= Alois Lichtsteiner =

Swiss painter (born 1950)

- Born: 9 July 1950 (age 76); Ohmstal, Lucerne, Switzerland
- Education: Kunstgewerbeschule Zürich
- Known for: Painting, object art, printmaking

Alois Lichtsteiner (born 9 July 1950) is a Swiss painter and object artist. His work has ranged from strongly coloured compositions to greyscale mountain paintings.

== Biography ==
Alois Lichtsteiner was born on 9 July 1950 in Ohmstal, Switzerland, where he grew up. He qualified as a primary-school teacher in 1970 and then worked in various trades. In 1974, he travelled through North and Central Africa. From 1975 to 1978, he studied at the Kunstgewerbeschule Zürich.

From 1980 to 1983, Lichtsteiner was a member of the Bern-based artists' group SILO, which exhibited at the Kunsthalle Bern and Kunsthaus Zürich. He received Swiss federal art scholarships in 1983 and 1984. A Bern Cantonal scholarship enabled Lichtsteiner to spend 1989–1990 at the Cité internationale des arts in Paris. From 1994 to 1997, he taught at the École cantonale d'art du Valais in Sion before establishing working bases in Murten and Paris. Lichtsteiner signs his works OHMSTAL, explaining that he chose the name because he finds it "a beautiful word". He uses the signature to place the work, rather than himself as the artist, at the centre.

Lichtsteiner's solo exhibitions included the Kunstmuseum Sion in 1989, Kunsthalle Bern and Kunstverein Freiburg im Breisgau in 1992, Kunstmuseum Luzern in 2001, Kunsthaus Grenchen in 2012, and the Museum Franz Gertsch in 2025.

== Work ==
Lichtsteiner's 1983 painting Tot aufgefunden ("Found Dead") depicts an ambiguous black form on a wooden base with a broad paintbrush beside it. In the mid-1980s, Lichtsteiner developed the series Der Inhalt der Gefässe, in which vessel forms were reduced to simple outlines. He later extended the series into thin-walled ceramic vessels that were themselves painted.

In the 1980s, Lichtsteiner produced paintings characterised by strong colour. From 1997, he deliberately shifted away from colour and worked in greyscale. From the late 1990s, he developed the Birke (1997–2000) and Berg (1998–2016) series, both using a black-and-white palette and thickly applied paint. Around 2000, he produced a group of works titled Ohne Titel (Birke), based on the appearance of birch bark. A 2001 exhibition at the Kunstmuseum Luzern presented works from a series of about 60 paintings based on birch bark. In these paintings, the bark fills the entire picture field, with the edges and curvature of the trunk excluded from view. The exhibition also introduced early examples of a new series in which Lichtsteiner developed the concerns of the birch paintings through the motif of a mountain slope partly covered with snow.

Lichtsteiner's return to colour from 2011 followed an intensive engagement with printmaking. In his later mountain paintings, snowy areas remained largely white, while the rock formations were rendered in varying colours.

Lichtsteiner planned a group of eight large paintings by 2006, when he acquired the materials for the entire group. The final two works were completed for his 2025 exhibition at the Museum Franz Gertsch. Each of the eight paintings measures 244 by 320 centimetres, and the complete group was shown together for the first time in 2025.

In his later painting process, Lichtsteiner used photographs as an intermediate step, projecting them onto the canvas before tracing and painting the forms. In some of his later paintings, the paint rises from the surface and curls at the edges, giving the work a sculptural quality. The paint surface can also reach as much as one centimetre in thickness.
