= Ebersecken =

- Former municipality
- Coat of arms
- Location of Ebersecken
- Location within Switzerland Location within Canton of Lucerne
- Coordinates: 47°11′N 7°56′E
- Country: Switzerland
- Canton: Lucerne
- District: Willisau

Area
  - Total: 8.57 km^{2} (3.31 sq mi)
- Elevation: 548 m (1,798 ft)

Population (December 2020)
  - Total: 369
  - Density: 43.1/km^{2} (112/sq mi)
- Time zone: UTC+01:00 (CET)
  - Summer (DST): UTC+02:00 (CEST)
- Postal code: 6245
- SFOS number: 1126
- ISO 3166 code: CH-LU
- Surrounded by: Altbüron, Altishofen, Fischbach, Grossdietwil, Nebikon, Ohmstal, Reiden, Schötz, Zell
- Website: Profile (in German), SFSO statistics

Ebersecken is a former municipality in the district of Willisau in the canton of Lucerne in Switzerland. On 1 January 2020 the former municipality of Ebersecken merged into Altishofen.

== History ==
Ebersecken is first mentioned in 1274 as Eberseche. In 1275 it was mentioned as Ebersegge.

== Geography ==
Ebersecken has an area, as of 2006, of 8.6 km^{2} (3.3 sq mi). Of this area, 79% is used for agricultural purposes, while 17.2% is forested. Of the rest of the land, 3.7% is settled (buildings or roads) and the remainder (0.1%) is non-productive (rivers). In the 1997 land survey, 17.39% of the total land area was forested. Of the agricultural land, 74.1% is used for farming or pastures, while 4.67% is used for orchards or vine crops. Of the settled areas, 2.33% is covered with buildings, 0.47% is classed as special developments, and 0.93% is transportation infrastructure.

The municipality is located in the Willisauer Bergland (Willisau highlands). It consists of the village of Ebersecken and several small hamlets.

== Demographics ==
Ebersecken has a population (as of 31 December 2020) of 369. As of 2007, 13 or about 3.1% are not Swiss citizens. Over the last 10 years the population has grown at a rate of 0.5%. Most of the population (as of 2000) speaks German (98.0%), with Albanian being second most common ( 1.2%) and French being third ( 0.2%).

In the 2007 election the most popular party was the CVP which received 39.6% of the vote. The next three most popular parties were the FDP (28.6%), the SVP (28.4%) and the Green Party (1.9%).

The age distribution, as of 2008, in Ebersecken is; 133 people or 31.3% of the population is 0–19 years old. 108 people or 25.4% are 20–39 years old, and 132 people or 31.1% are 40–64 years old. The senior population distribution is 43 people or 10.1% are 65–79 years old, 7 or 1.6% are 80–89 years old and 2 people or 0.5% of the population are 90+ years old.

The entire Swiss population is generally well educated. In Ebersecken about 54.7% of the population (between age 25-64) have completed either non-mandatory upper secondary education or additional higher education (either university or a Fachhochschule).

As of 2000 there are 122 households, of which 27 households (or about 22.1%) contain only a single individual. 35 or about 28.7% are large households, with at least five members. As of 2000 there were 81 inhabited buildings in the municipality, of which 32 were built only as housing, and 49 were mixed use buildings. There were 18 single family homes, 9 double family homes, and 5 multi-family homes in the municipality. Most homes were either two (21) or three (8) story structures. There were only 1 single story buildings and 2 four or more story buildings.

Ebersecken has an unemployment rate of 0.67%. As of 2005, there were 127 people employed in the primary economic sector and about 46 businesses involved in this sector. 6 people are employed in the secondary sector and there are 2 businesses in this sector. 45 people are employed in the tertiary sector, with 6 businesses in this sector. As of 2000 52.2% of the population of the municipality were employed in some capacity. At the same time, females made up 36.5% of the workforce.

In the 2000 census the religious membership of Ebersecken was; 350 (86.6%) were Roman Catholic, and 23 (5.7%) were Protestant, with an additional 1 (0.25%) that were of some other Christian faith. There are 4 individuals (0.99% of the population) who are Muslim. Of the rest; there were 9 (2.23%) who do not belong to any organized religion, 17 (4.21%) who did not answer the question.

The historical population is given in the following table:

year	population
about 1695	ca. 150
1798	541
1850	583
1900	476
1950	552
1990	386
2000	404
