= Willisau =

- Municipality
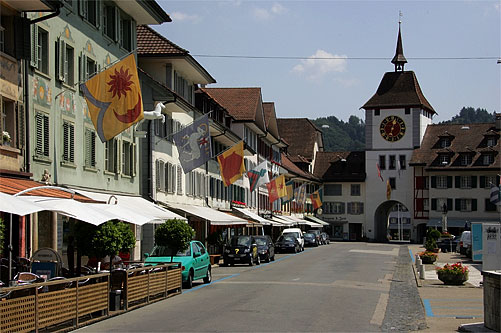

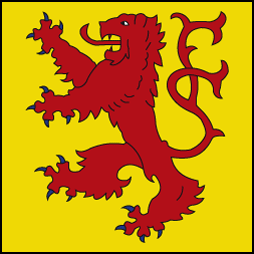
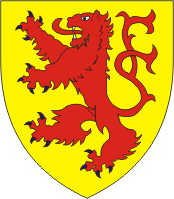
- Flag Coat of arms
- Location of Willisau
- Location within Switzerland Location within Canton of Lucerne
- Coordinates: 47°7′N 8°0′E
- Country: Switzerland
- Canton: Lucerne
- District: Willisau

Area
  - Total: 41.69 km^{2} (16.10 sq mi)
- Elevation: 557 m (1,827 ft)

Population (December 2020)
  - Total: 7,752
  - Density: 185.9/km^{2} (481.6/sq mi)
- Time zone: UTC+01:00 (CET)
  - Summer (DST): UTC+02:00 (CEST)
- Postal code: 6130
- SFOS number: 1151
- ISO 3166 code: CH-LU
- Surrounded by: Alberswil, Ettiswil, Gettnau, Grosswangen, Hergiswil bei Willisau, Luthern, Menznau, Ufhusen, Zell
- Website: willisau.ch

Willisau is a municipality in the district of Willisau in the Lucerne canton of Switzerland. It was formed on 1 January 2006 from the municipalities of Willisau Land (W. Country) and Willisau Stadt (W. Town). On 1 January 2021 the former municipality of Gettnau merged into Willisau.

== History ==
=== Foundation ===
There were Roman settlements near Willisau by the 2nd or 3rd century AD. In 893 the Alamannic settlement of Cozeriswilare / Gesserswil was mentioned near modern Willisau. By the 11th century a parish church existed in the area and in 1101 the lords of Honstetten (Hegau) were mentioned as holding the patronage rights over the church at Willineshouwo. In 1245 the Freiherr von Hasenburg held the church and the surrounding lands as a fief for the Habsburgs.

In 1302-3 the three Hasenburg brothers, Markward, Heimo and Walter, founded the fortified town of Willisau. The new town was granted the right to have a wall and fortifications by the Habsburgs and later the right to hold markets. At the time of its founding it probably had about 150 citizens. Through marriage, in 1367, the Counts of Aarberg-Valangin inherited the town. However, it still remained a fief under the Austrian Habsburgs. In 1375 Duke Leopold of Austria ordered the poorly fortified city to be burned to prevent its capture by the Guglers, English and French mercenaries who were raiding throughout the region. Just over ten years later, during the Sempach War of 1386, Leopold ordered the town burned again to prevent it falling into Swiss hands.

The small villages surrounding Willisau were founded during the Middle Ages and were ruled by a number of different nobles over the centuries.

=== Survival ===
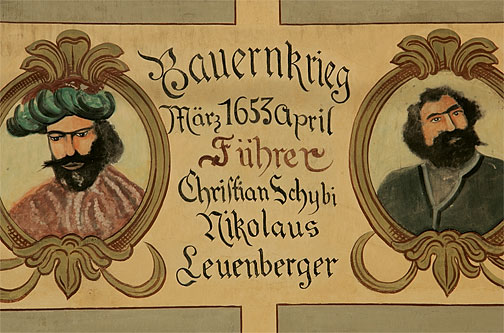
Wall painting commemorating two leaders of Swiss peasant war from Willisau

In 1407 the descendants of the Hasenburg family sold the town to Lucerne. Because the town sat on an important trade route from Lucerne to Bern, it grew into an important regional trade center and center of a district or vogtei. However, initially the vogt remained in Lucerne and ruled through local amtmann or bailiff. In 1471 a fire destroyed much of the town. Over the following centuries, the town gradually gained additional rights and autonomy.

After the Swiss peasant war of 1653 the vogt moved from Lucerne to Willisau to better control the countryside, while giving the town increased autonomy. In 1690-95 a large Bailiff's Castle was built by Landvogt Franz Bernhard Feer as a residence and administrative center of the vogt. By the 16th century the town had become the home of many small craftsmen and business owners. While the town remained somewhat prosperous, there were very few wealthy citizens. In 1704 the town was destroyed for a fourth time by a fire. Very few of the residents were wealthy enough to rebuild their homes and reconstruction was very slow.

=== Division and reunification ===
Before 2006, the municipality was divided into Willisau Stadt (the city, 337 hectares [830 acres]) and Willisau Land (countryside, 3,771 hectares [9,320 acres]).

During the 17th and 18th centuries the town was relatively well off, while Willisau Land was generally poorer. In 1763 a special tax was decreed on the town to help support the poor of the surrounding countryside. Those in Willisau Land were placed under the laws and jurisdiction of the town, but were no longer responsible to care for the poor. In 1798, following the creation of the Helvetic Republic, the special rights of the town's citizens were abolished and the two tax districts became separate municipalities. Following the collapse of the Republic and the 1803 Act of Mediation, the two municipalities became totally autonomous. Despite being two separate communities, Willisau Stadt remained the population and economic center of the area. By the 1990s the two municipalities shared a number of organizations and responsibilities.

On 25 January 2004, the population of both municipalities voted for reunification. So, on 1 January 2006 the formerly separate municipalities of Willisau Stadt and Willisau Land merged into the municipality of Willisau.

=== Gettnau ===
Gettnau is first mentioned in the 9th century as Kepinhouva.

== Geography ==
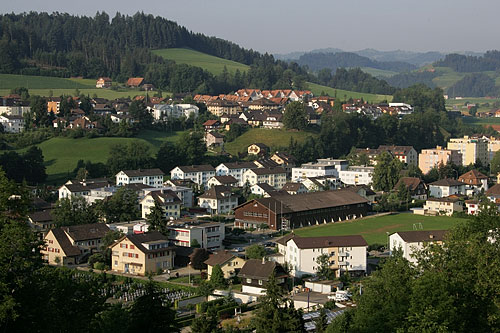
Willisau and surrounding hills

Aerial view (1949)

Willisau has an area, (as of the 2004/09 survey) of 47.22 km^{2} (18.23 sq mi). Of this area, about 63.5% is used for agricultural purposes, while 27.7% is forested. Of the rest of the land, 8.0% is settled (buildings or roads) and 0.8% is unproductive land. In the 2004/09 survey a total of 212 ha (520 acres) or about 5.1% of the total area was covered with buildings, an increase of 61 ha (150 acres) over the 1981 amount. Of the agricultural land, 71 ha (180 acres) is used for orchards and vineyards and 2,643 ha (6,530 acres) is fields and grasslands. Since 1981 the amount of agricultural land has decreased by 94 ha (230 acres). Over the same time period the amount of forested land has increased by 3 ha (7.4 acres). Rivers and lakes cover 43 ha (110 acres) in the municipality.

== Demographics ==
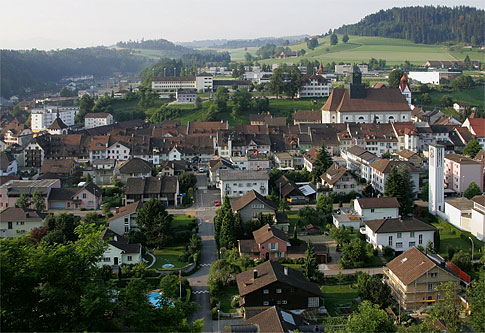
Willisau town

Willisau has a population (as of December 2020) of 7,752. As of 2008, 8.1% of the population are resident foreign nationals. Over the last 10 years (2000–2010) the population has changed at a rate of 2.3%. Migration accounted for 0%, while births and deaths accounted for 1.3%. Most of the population (as of 2000) speaks German (94.5%) as their first language, Albanian is the second most common (2.3%) and Serbo-Croatian is the third (0.7%).

As of 2008, the population was made up of 6,620 Swiss citizens and 586 non-citizen residents (8.13% of the population). As of 2000, children and teenagers (0–19 years old) make up 25.4% of the population, while adults (20–64 years old) make up 59% and seniors (over 64 years old) make up 15.7%.

As of 2009, the construction rate of new housing units was 1.8 new units per 1000 residents. The vacancy rate for the municipality, in 2010, was 0.49%.

== Historic population ==
The historical population is given in the following chart:

== Heritage sites of national significance ==
The Old City, the Catholic church of St. Peter and Paul, the Landvogteischloss (Bailiff's Castle) and the pilgrimage chapel of Heiligblut are listed as Swiss heritage site of national significance. The entire town of Willisau is part of the Inventory of Swiss Heritage Sites.

=== Parish church ===
The village of Willisau was founded near the first parish church. That first building was replaced with a Romanesque in the 13th century, of which only the tower remains. In 1805-10 the current church, with extensive classicist columns, was built on the site of the earlier churches. It was designed by Josef Purtschert. In 1929 it was renovated. During the renovation, a large reinforced concrete bell tower was added to the church roof. This tower is considered an architectural achievement in reinforced concrete construction. In 1995-7 the church was renovated and the interior was returned to its original appearance.

=== Holy Blood Church (Heiligblut) ===
The current chapel was built in 1674 on the site of an earlier Gothic chapel and an even earlier wooden chapel. According to legend, on 7 July 1392 three men were playing cards near the chapel site. When one of the men lost all his money, he drew his sword and cursed Christ. Five drops of blood fell on the table and the blasphemer, Ueli Schröter, was dragged away by the Devil. The second man died as he tried to clean up the five drops of blood and the third fled and died outside the town gates. The table with five drops of holy blood was saved by a local priest and the wooden chapel was built to hold it. The current chapel was built in the Renaissance style with a large Tuscan porch. Three wooden early Baroque altars were added a few years later. The walls are decorated with eight paintings of the legend of the Holy Blood. The ceiling was decorated with 70 paintings by Anton Amberg, showing biblical scenes, the apostles and patrons of the chapel.

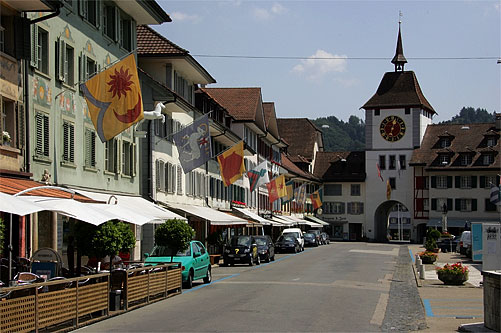
Old City

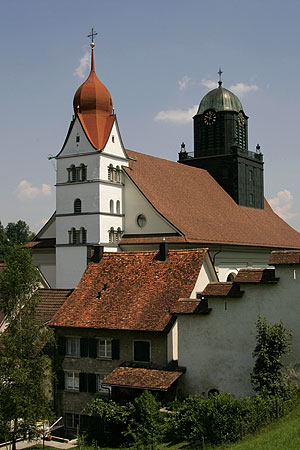
Catholic Church St. Peter and Paul

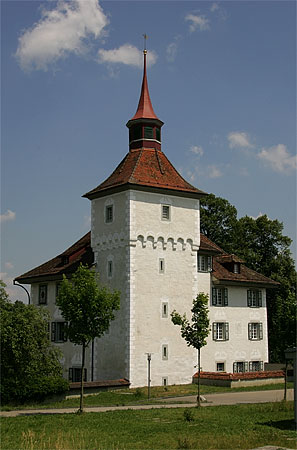
Landvogteischloss

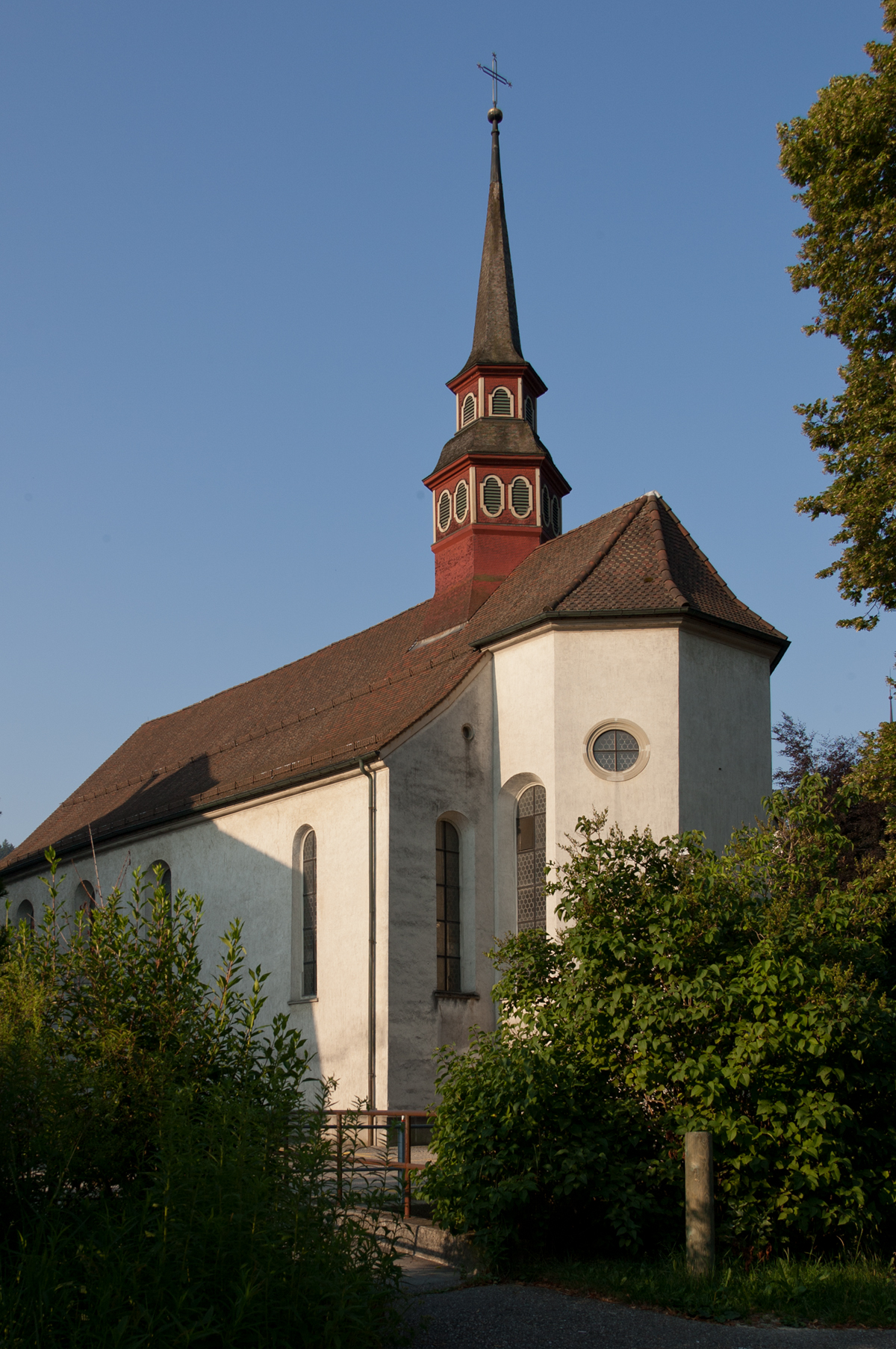
Pilgrimage chapel of Heiligblut

== Politics ==
In the 2015 federal election the most popular party was the CVP with 31.6% of the vote. The next three most popular parties were the SVP (27.9%), the FDP (19.7%) and the SP (9.9%). In the federal election, a total of 3,243 votes were cast, and the voter turnout was 58.2%.

In the 2007 federal election the most popular party was the CVP which received 38.72% of the vote. The next three most popular parties were the FDP (25.17%), the SVP (20.77%) and the SPS (7.34%). In the federal election, a total of 3,243 votes were cast, and the voter turnout was 61.9%.

== Economy ==
Willisau is a mixed agro-industrial community, a municipality where agriculture and manufacturing play a significant role in the economy.

As of 2014, there were a total of 4,888 people employed in the municipality. Of these, a total of 486 people worked in 182 businesses in the primary economic sector. The secondary sector employed 1,162 workers in 104 separate businesses, of which there were 24 small businesses with a total of 523 employees and 5 mid sized businesses with a total of 412 employees. Finally, the tertiary sector provided 3,240 jobs in 460 businesses. There were 45 small businesses with a total of 1,205 employees and 6 mid sized businesses with a total of 670 employees.

In 2015 a total of 5.4% of the population received social assistance. In 2011 the unemployment rate in the municipality was 0.9%.

In 2015 local hotels had a total of 5,451 overnight stays, of which 67.1% were international visitors.

In 2015 the average cantonal, municipal and church tax rate in the municipality for a couple with two children making SFr 80,000 was 5.2% while the rate for a single person making SFr 150,000 was 15.4%, both of which are close to the average for the canton. In 2013 the average income in the municipality per tax payer was SFr 68,376 and the per person average was SFr 28,594, which is less than the cantonal average of SFr 77,327 and SFr 33,180 respectively It is also less than the national per tax payer average of SFr 82,682 and the per person average of SFr 35,825.

In 2008 the total number of full-time equivalent jobs was 3,170. The number of jobs in the primary sector was 342, of which 339 were in agriculture and 4 were in fishing or fisheries. The number of jobs in the secondary sector was 987 of which 605 or (61.3%) were in manufacturing and 378 (38.3%) were in construction. The number of jobs in the tertiary sector was 1,841. In the tertiary sector; 479 or 26.0% were in wholesale or retail sales or the repair of motor vehicles, 82 or 4.5% were in the movement and storage of goods, 103 or 5.6% were in a hotel or restaurant, 113 or 6.1% were in the information industry, 88 or 4.8% were the insurance or financial industry, 148 or 8.0% were technical professionals or scientists, 269 or 14.6% were in education and 337 or 18.3% were in health care.

Of the working population, 9.3% used public transportation to get to work, and 52.2% used a private car.

== Education ==
In Willisau about 47.7% of the population have completed non-mandatory upper secondary education, and 18.2% have completed additional higher education (either university or a Fachhochschule).

The Canton of Lucerne school system may provide one year of non-obligatory Preschool and always provides one year of obligatory Kindergarten, followed by six years of Primary school. This is followed by three years of obligatory lower Secondary school where the students are separated into four levels according to ability and aptitude. Following the lower Secondary students may attend additional schooling or they may enter an apprenticeship.

Willisau hosts a gymnasium with about 540 students in 28 different classes.

During the 2009–10 school year, there were a total of 1,102 students attending classes in Willisau. There were 5 kindergarten classes with a total of 89 students in the municipality. Of the kindergarten students, 13.5% were permanent or temporary residents of Switzerland (not citizens) and 14.6% have a different mother language than the classroom language. The municipality had 21 primary classes and 427 students. Of the primary students, 11.2% were permanent or temporary residents of Switzerland (not citizens) and 15.7% have a different mother language than the classroom language. There were also 12 students who attended a special, smaller primary class. There were 305 students who attended 16 advanced, pre-Gymnasium classes. During the same year, there were 16 lower secondary classes with a total of 269 students. A total of 189 or 70.3% of the students are in the highest two levels (which generally lead to a university education), while 70 or 26.0% of the students are in the third level (which may lead to a Fachhochschule education or apprenticeship) and 10 or 3.7% of the students are in the lowest level (which may lead to an apprenticeship).

Willisau is home to the Regionalbibliothek Willisau library. The library has (as of 2008) 10,898 books or other media, and loaned out 28,107 items in the same year. It was open a total of 146 days with average of 10 hours per week during that year.

== Notable people ==
- Moritz Anton Cappeller (1685–1769) a Willisau-born Swiss naturalist and physician.
- Niklaus Troxler (born 1947) a Swiss graphic designer, organized the Willisau Jazz Festival from 1975 to 2009.
- Urs Bühler (born 1971 in Willisau) a classically trained Swiss tenor and member of the classical crossover group Il Divo
- Rolf Scherrer (born 1972 in Willisau) a retired amateur Swiss freestyle heavyweight wrestler
- Fabienne Meyer (born 1981) a Swiss former bobsledder, lives in Willisau
