= Nebikon =

- Municipality
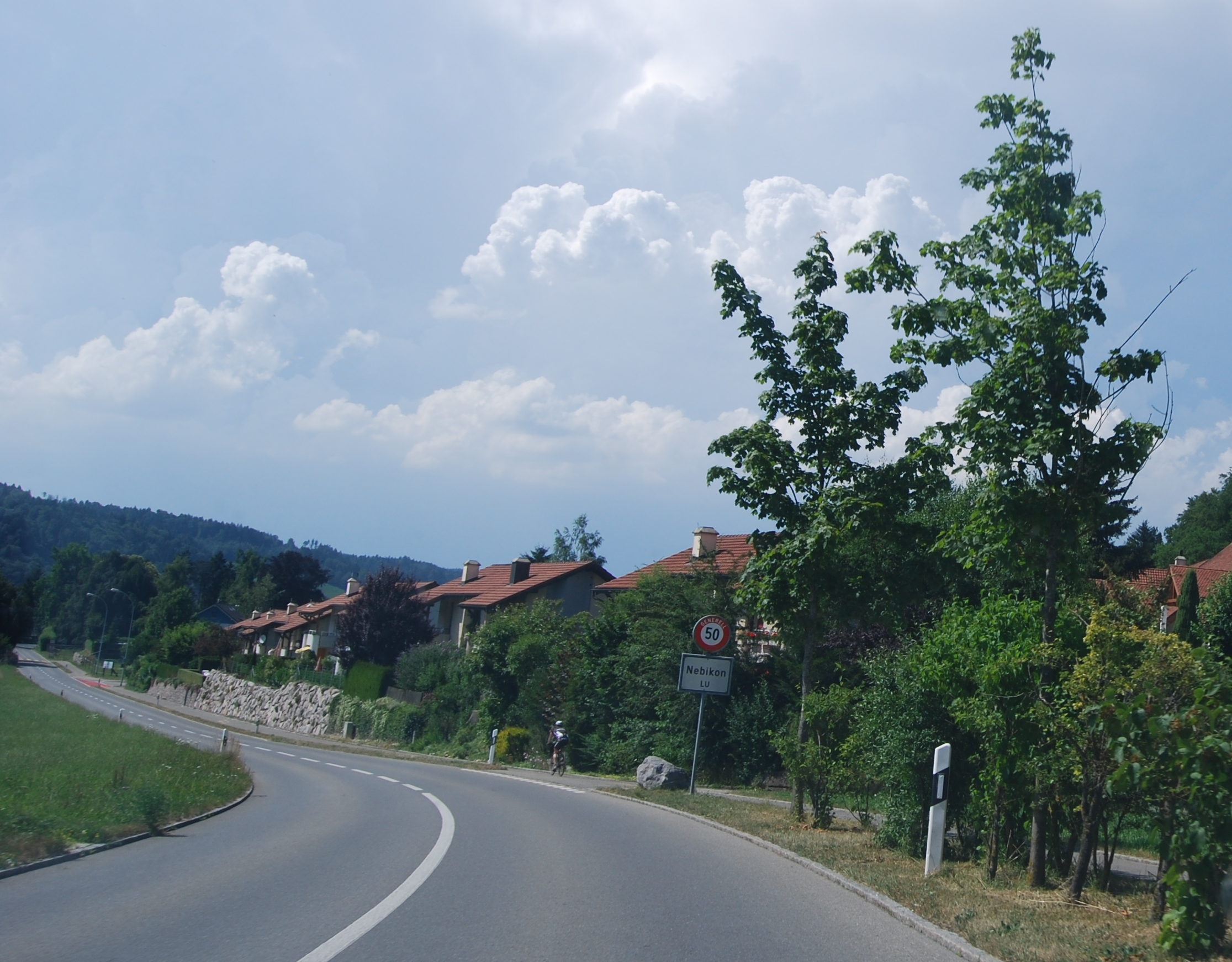

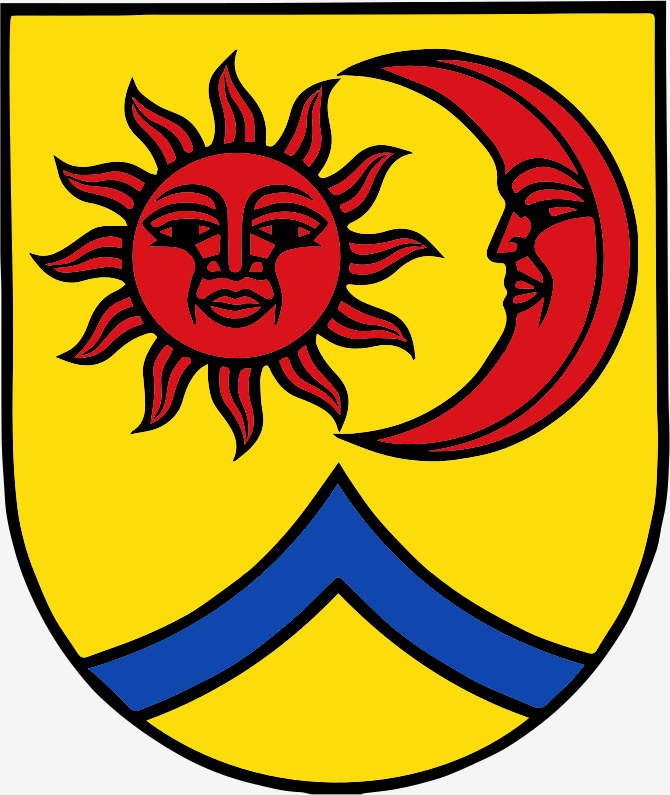
- Coat of arms
- Location of Nebikon
- Location within Switzerland Location within Canton of Lucerne
- Coordinates: 47°11′N 7°58′E
- Country: Switzerland
- Canton: Lucerne
- District: Willisau

Area
  - Total: 3.73 km^{2} (1.44 sq mi)
- Elevation: 487 m (1,598 ft)

Population (December 2020)
  - Total: 2,713
  - Density: 727/km^{2} (1,880/sq mi)
- Time zone: UTC+01:00 (CET)
  - Summer (DST): UTC+02:00 (CEST)
- Postal code: 6244
- SFOS number: 1137
- ISO 3166 code: CH-LU
- Surrounded by: Altishofen, Dagmersellen, Ebersecken, Egolzwil, Schötz
- Website: www.nebikon.ch

Nebikon is a municipality in the district of Willisau in the canton of Lucerne in Switzerland.

== History ==
Nebikon is first mentioned in 924 as Nevinhova.

== Geography ==
Aerial view (1957)

Nebikon has an area, as of 2006, of 3.7 km^{2} (1.4 sq mi). Of this area, 38.3% is used for agricultural purposes, while 39.9% is forested. Of the rest of the land, 20.6% is settled (buildings or roads) and the remainder (1.1%) is non-productive rivers. In the 1997 land survey, 40.05% of the total land area was forested. Of the agricultural land, 35.22% is used for farming or pastures, while 2.96% is used for orchards or vine crops. Of the settled areas, 9.95% is covered with buildings, 4.84% is industrial, 1.34% is parks or greenbelts and 4.57% is transportation infrastructure.

The municipality is located at the confluence of the Luthern and Wigger rivers.

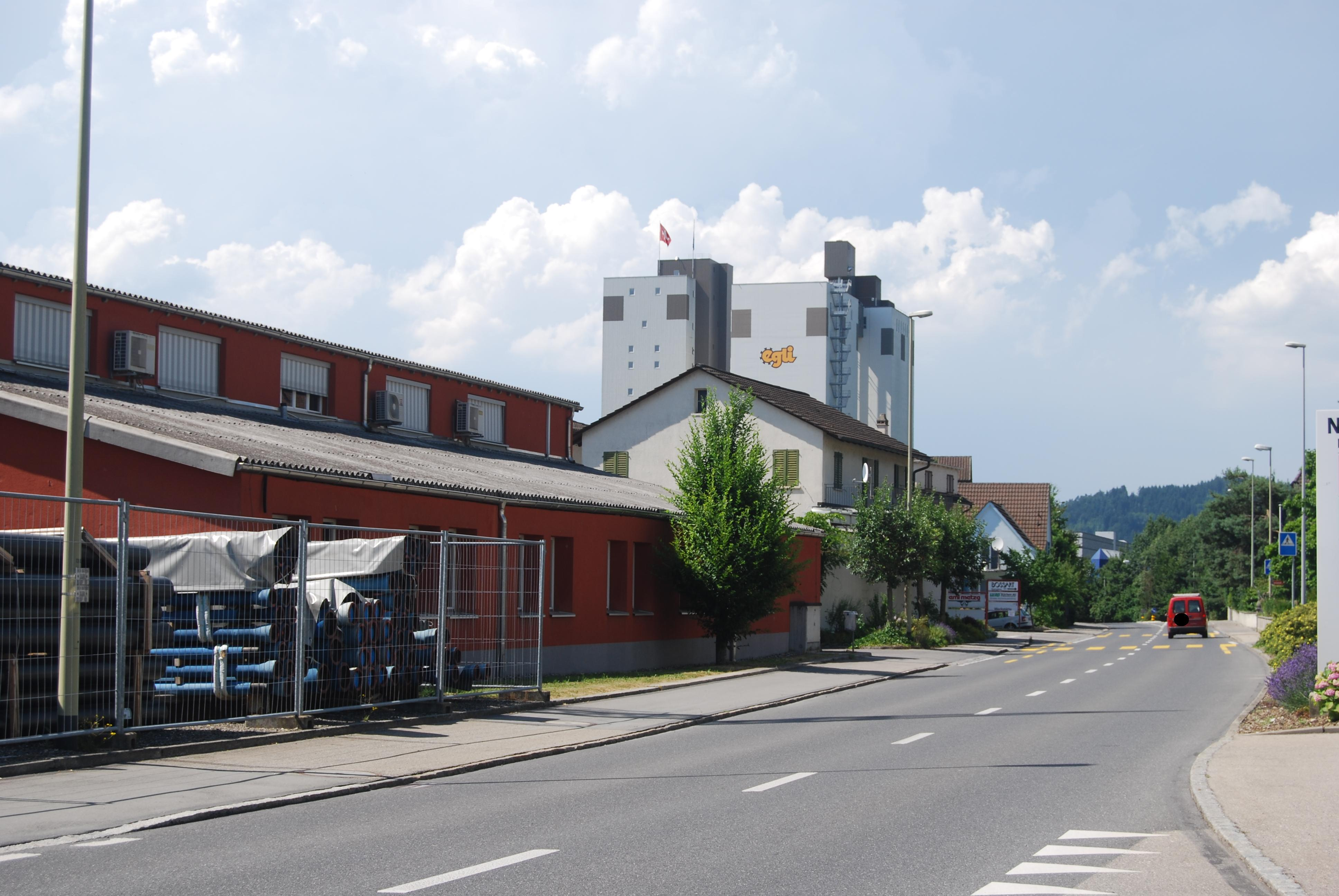
Nebikon

== Demographics ==
Nebikon has a population (as of 31 December 2020) of 2,713. As of 2007, 585 or about 25.7% are not Swiss citizens. Over the last 10 years the population has grown at a rate of 1.5%. Most of the population (as of 2000) speaks German (84.4%), with Serbo-Croatian being second most common ( 5.2%) and Albanian being third ( 2.0%).

In the 2007 election the most popular party was the FDP which received 41.3% of the vote. The next three most popular parties were the CVP (28.6%), the SVP (21%) and the SPS (4.2%).

The age distribution, as of 2008, in Nebikon is; 510 people or 22.4% of the population is 0–19 years old. 728 people or 32% are 20–39 years old, and 752 people or 33.1% are 40–64 years old. The senior population distribution is 198 people or 8.7% are 65–79 years old, 74 or 3.3% are 80–89 years old and 10 people or 0.4% of the population are 90+ years old.

In Nebikon about 57.8% of the population (between age 25-64) have completed either non-mandatory upper secondary education or additional higher education (either university or a Fachhochschule).

As of 2000 there are 800 households, of which 208 households (or about 26.0%) contain only a single individual. 82 or about 10.3% are large households, with at least five members. As of 2000 there were 384 inhabited buildings in the municipality, of which 318 were built only as housing, and 66 were mixed use buildings. There were 207 single family homes, 46 double family homes, and 65 multi-family homes in the municipality. Most homes were either two (200) or three (77) story structures. There were only 21 single story buildings and 20 four or more story buildings.

Nebikon has an unemployment rate of 2.02%. As of 2005, there were 46 people employed in the primary economic sector and about 15 businesses involved in this sector. 388 people are employed in the secondary sector and there are 19 businesses in this sector. 417 people are employed in the tertiary sector, with 60 businesses in this sector. As of 2000 52.3% of the population of the municipality were employed in some capacity. At the same time, females made up 39.6% of the workforce.

In the 2000 census the religious membership of Nebikon was; 1,506 (70.3%) were Roman Catholic, and 185 (8.6%) were Protestant, with an additional 128 (5.98%) that were of some other Christian faith. There are 144 individuals (6.73% of the population) who are Muslim. Of the rest; there were 30 (1.4%) individuals who belong to another religion (not listed), 70 (3.27%) who do not belong to any organized religion, 78 (3.64%) who did not answer the question.

The historical population is given in the following table:

year	population
about 1695	ca. 280
1798	128
1816	450
1850	578
1900	610
1950	971
2000	2,141
