= Grossdietwil =

- Municipality
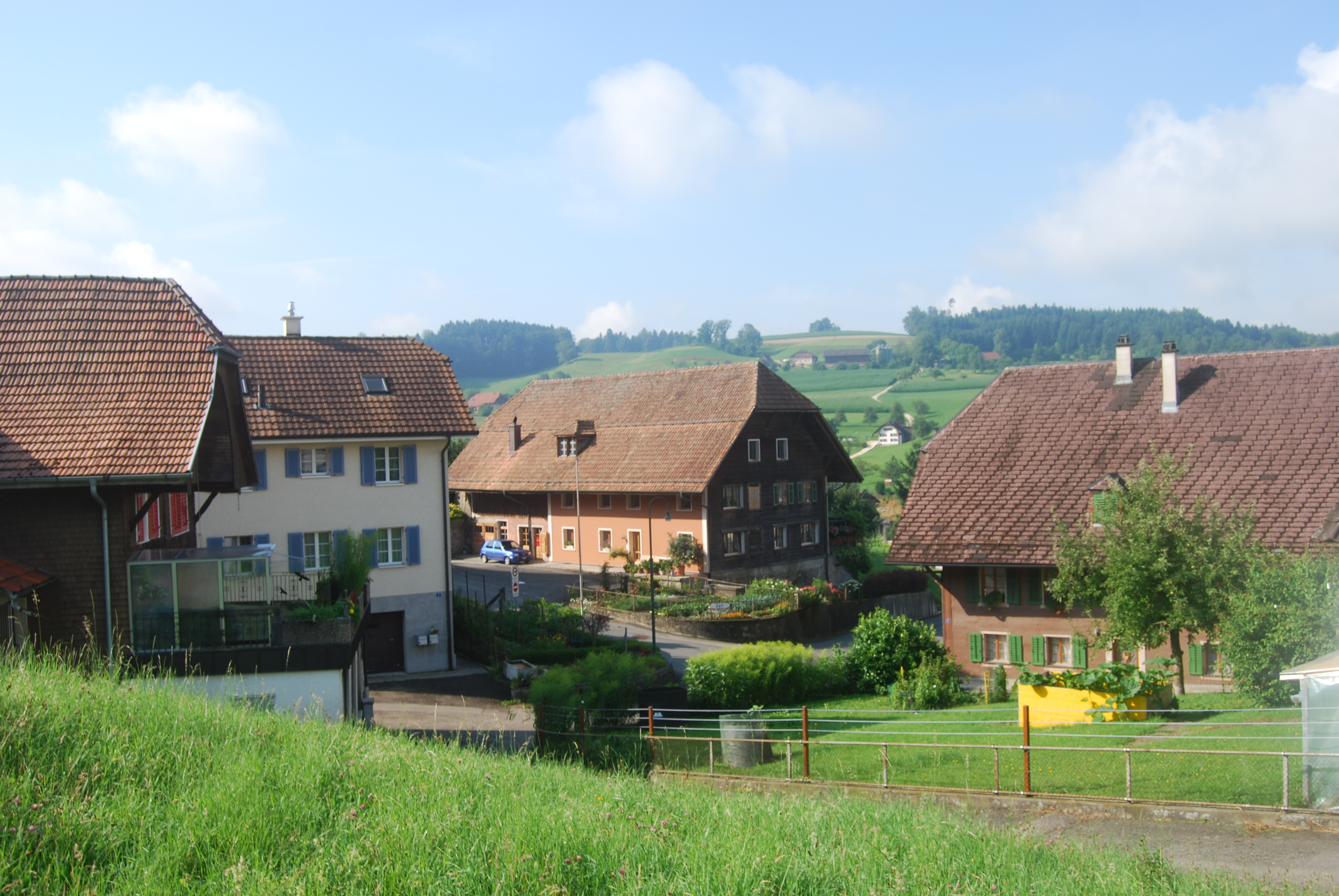

- Flag Coat of arms
- Location of Grossdietwil
- Location within Switzerland Location within Canton of Lucerne
- Coordinates: 47°10′N 7°53′E
- Country: Switzerland
- Canton: Lucerne
- District: Willisau

Area
  - Total: 10.23 km^{2} (3.95 sq mi)
- Elevation: 571 m (1,873 ft)

Population (December 2020)
  - Total: 855
  - Density: 83.6/km^{2} (216/sq mi)
- Time zone: UTC+01:00 (CET)
  - Summer (DST): UTC+02:00 (CEST)
- Postal code: 6146
- SFOS number: 1131
- ISO 3166 code: CH-LU
- Surrounded by: Altbüron, Ebersecken, Fischbach, Gondiswil (BE), Melchnau (BE), Ohmstal, Pfaffnau, Reiden, Roggliswil
- Website: www.grossdietwil.ch

Grossdietwil is a municipality in the district of Willisau in the canton of Lucerne in Switzerland.

== History ==
Grossdietwil is first mentioned in 1194 as Toutwillare. Since 1810 it has been known as Grossdietwil.

== Geography ==
Grossdietwil has an area, as of 2006, of 10.2 km^{2} (3.9 sq mi). Of this area, 72.2% is used for agricultural purposes, while 22% is forested. The rest of the land, (5.8%) is settled. In the 1997 land survey, 21.99% of the total land area was forested. Of the agricultural land, 68.82% is used for farming or pastures, while 3.42% is used for orchards or vine crops. Of the settled areas, 2.64% is covered with buildings, 0.1% is industrial, 0.39% is classed as special developments, 0.49% is parks or greenbelts and 2.15% is transportation infrastructure.

The municipality is located in the upper Rot valley (Rottal). It consists of the village of Grossdietwil, the hamlets of Arpolingen and Kället and the exclave of Eppenwil.

== Demographics ==
Grossdietwil has a population (as of 31 December 2020) of 855. As of 2007, 56 or about 6.7% are not Swiss citizens. Over the last 10 years the population has decreased at a rate of -9.6%. Most of the population (as of 2000) speaks German (93.4%), with Albanian being second most common (4.2%) and Portuguese being third (0.5%).

In the 2007 election the most popular party was the CVP which received 49.5% of the vote. The next three most popular parties were the SVP (23.2%), the FDP (17.5%) and the Green Party (5.5%).

The age distribution, as of 2008, in Grossdietwil is; 251 people or 29.9% of the population is 0–19 years old. 184 people or 21.9% are 20–39 years old, and 290 people or 34.6% are 40–64 years old. The senior population distribution is 83 people or 9.9% are 65–79 years old, 26 or 3.1% are 80–89 years old and 5 people or 0.6% of the population are 90+ years old.

The entire Swiss population is generally well educated. In Grossdietwil about 68.2% of the population (between age 25-64) have completed either non-mandatory upper secondary education or additional higher education (either university or a Fachhochschule).

As of 2000 there are 262 households, of which 59 households (or about 22.5%) contain only a single individual. 56 or about 21.4% are large households, with at least five members. As of 2000 there were 181 inhabited buildings in the municipality, of which 101 were built only as housing, and 80 were mixed use buildings. There were 74 single family homes, 20 double family homes, and 7 multi-family homes in the municipality. Most homes were either two (68) or three (21) story structures. There were only 7 single story buildings and 5 four or more story buildings.

Grossdietwil has an unemployment rate of 0.89%. As of 2005, there were 116 people employed in the primary economic sector and about 41 businesses involved in this sector. 84 people are employed in the secondary sector and there are 12 businesses in this sector. 62 people are employed in the tertiary sector, with 17 businesses in this sector. As of 2000 49.3% of the population of the municipality were employed in some capacity. At the same time, females made up 37.2% of the workforce.

In the 2000 census the religious membership of Grossdietwil was; 660 (81.7%) were Roman Catholic, and 78 (9.7%) were Protestant, with an additional 5 (0.62%) that were of some other Christian faith. There are 34 individuals (4.21% of the population) who are Muslim. Of the rest; there were 11 (1.36%) who do not belong to any organized religion, 20 (2.48%) who did not answer the question.

The historical population is given in the following table:

year	population
about 1695	ca. 410 (Note: Eppenwil had a population of ca. 160 which is not included.)
1798	681
1837	1,324
1850	129
1900	918
1930	806
1950	868
1980	740
2000	808
