= Ufhusen =

- Municipality
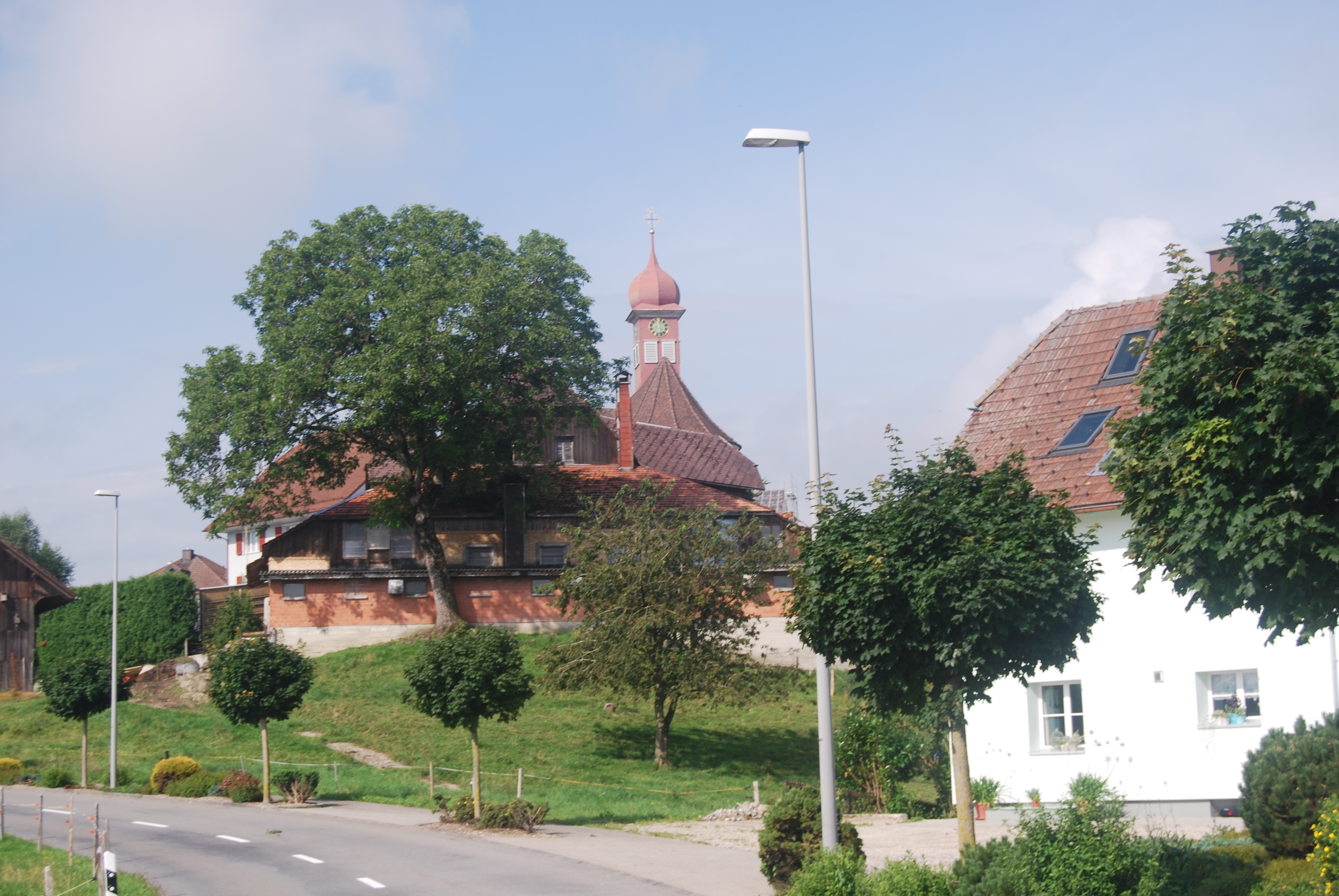

- Flag Coat of arms
- Location of Ufhusen
- Location within Switzerland Location within Canton of Lucerne
- Coordinates: 47°7′N 7°54′E
- Country: Switzerland
- Canton: Lucerne
- District: Willisau

Area
  - Total: 12.25 km^{2} (4.73 sq mi)
- Elevation: 717 m (2,352 ft)

Population (December 2020)
  - Total: 927
  - Density: 75.7/km^{2} (196/sq mi)
- Time zone: UTC+01:00 (CET)
  - Summer (DST): UTC+02:00 (CEST)
- Postal code: 6153
- SFOS number: 1145
- ISO 3166 code: CH-LU
- Surrounded by: Eriswil (BE), Fischbach, Gondiswil (BE), Huttwil (BE), Luthern, Willisau, Zell
- Website: http://www.ufhusen.ch/

Ufhusen is a municipality in the district of Willisau in the canton of Lucerne in Switzerland.

== Geography ==
Ufhusen has an area, as of 2006, of 12.3 km^{2} (4.7 sq mi). Of this area, 73.6% is used for agricultural purposes, while 20.7% is forested. Of the rest of the land, 5.6% is settled (buildings or roads) and the remainder (0.2%) is non-productive land. In the 1997 land survey, 20.65% of the total land area was forested. Of the agricultural land, 71.35% is used for farming or pastures, while 2.2% is used for orchards or vine crops. Of the settled areas, 1.71% is covered with buildings, 0.08% is industrial, 2.2% is classed as special developments, 0.16% is parks or greenbelts and 1.47% is transportation infrastructure.

== Demographics ==
Ufhusen has a population (as of 31 December 2020) of 927. As of 2007, 28 or about 3.3% are not Swiss citizens. Over the last 10 years the population has grown at a rate of 1.6%. Most of the population (as of 2000) speaks German (98.6%), with French being second most common ( 0.5%) and Albanian being third ( 0.5%).

In the 2007 election the most popular party was the CVP which received 47.8% of the vote. The next three most popular parties were the SVP (30%), the FDP (16.1%) and the Green Party (2.7%).

The age distribution, as of 2008, in Ufhusen is; 239 people or 28% of the population is 0–19 years old. 221 people or 25.9% are 20–39 years old, and 266 people or 31.2% are 40–64 years old. The senior population distribution is 97 people or 11.4% are 65–79 years old, 23 or 2.7% are 80–89 years old and 7 people or 0.8% of the population are 90+ years old.

In Ufhusen about 66.9% of the population (between age 25–64) have completed either non-mandatory upper secondary education or additional higher education (either university or a Fachhochschule).

As of 2000 there are 267 households, of which 67 households (or about 25.1%) contain only a single individual. 56 or about 21.0% are large households, with at least five members. As of 2000 there were 185 inhabited buildings in the municipality, of which 89 were built only as housing, and 96 were mixed use buildings. There were 63 single family homes, 13 double family homes, and 13 multi-family homes in the municipality. Most homes were either two (51) or three (23) story structures. There were only 12 single story buildings and 3 four or more story buildings.

Ufhusen has an unemployment rate of 0.88%. As of 2005, there were 168 people employed in the primary economic sector and about 67 businesses involved in this sector. 29 people are employed in the secondary sector and there are 12 businesses in this sector. 78 people are employed in the tertiary sector, with 21 businesses in this sector. As of 2000 51.3% of the population of the municipality were employed in some capacity. At the same time, females made up 38.8% of the workforce.

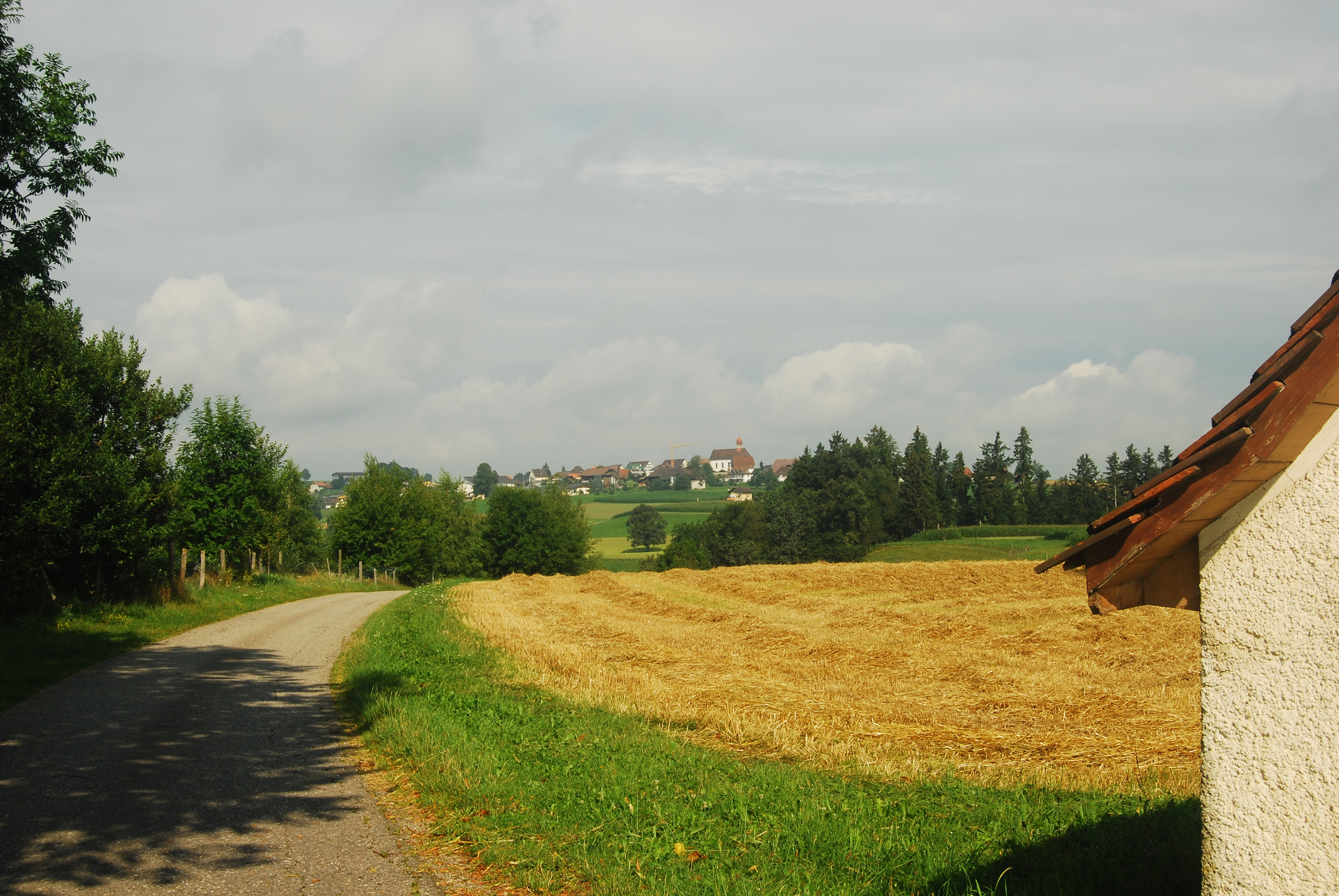
Ufhusen

In the 2000 census the religious membership of Ufhusen was as follows: 573 (72.6%) were Roman Catholic, 169 (21.4%) were Protestant, with an additional 1 (0.13%) that were of some other Christian faith. There were 4 individuals (0.51% of the population) who were Muslim. Of the rest, there were 14 (1.77%) who did not belong to any organized religion and 28 (3.55%) who did not answer the question.
