= Altishofen =

- Municipality
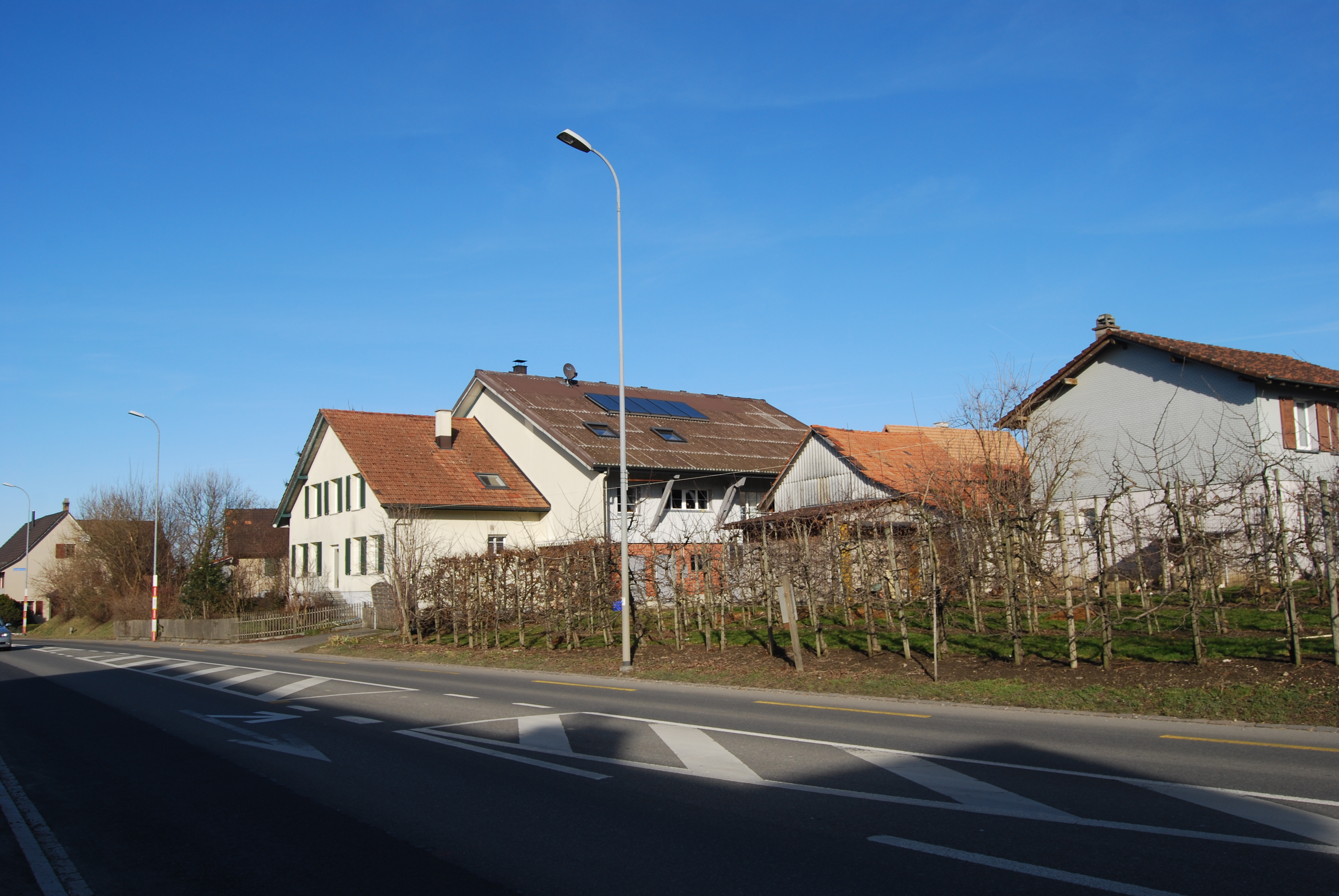

- Flag Coat of arms
- Location of Altishofen
- Location within Switzerland Location within Canton of Lucerne
- Coordinates: 47°12′N 7°58′E
- Country: Switzerland
- Canton: Lucerne
- District: Willisau

Area
  - Total: 5.76 km^{2} (2.22 sq mi)
- Elevation: 482 m (1,581 ft)

Population (December 2020)
  - Total: 1,959
  - Density: 340/km^{2} (881/sq mi)
- Time zone: UTC+01:00 (CET)
  - Summer (DST): UTC+02:00 (CEST)
- Postal code: 6246
- SFOS number: 1123
- ISO 3166 code: CH-LU
- Surrounded by: Dagmersellen, Ebersecken, Nebikon, Reiden
- Website: www.altishofen.ch

Altishofen is a municipality in the district of Willisau in the canton of Lucerne in Switzerland. On 1 January 2020 the former municipality of Ebersecken merged into Altishofen.

== History ==
Altishofen is first mentioned around 1184-90 as Alteloshovin. In 1190 it was mentioned as Alteloshoven.

== Geography ==
Aerial view (1957)

Altishofen has an area, as of 2006, of 5.7 km^{2} (2.2 sq mi). Of this area, 51% is used for agricultural purposes, while 38.5% is forested. Of the rest of the land, 10.1% is settled (buildings or roads) and the remainder (0.3%) is non-productive (rivers). In the 1997 land survey, 38.72% of the total land area was forested. Of the agricultural land, 47.05% is used for farming or pastures, while 3.82% is used for orchards or vine crops. Of the settled areas, 4.86% is covered with buildings, 2.43% is industrial, and 2.78% is transportation infrastructure.

The municipality is located in the Wiggertal. It consists of the village of Altishofen and the hamlets of Eichbühl.

== Demographics ==
Altishofen has a population (as of 31 December 2020) of 1,959. As of 2007, 188 or about 14.2% are not Swiss citizens. Over the last 10 years the population has grown at a rate of 7.4%. Most of the population (as of 2000) speaks German (90.4%), with Albanian being second most common (2.5%) and Serbo-Croatian being third (2.3%).

In the 2007 election the most popular party was the CVP which received 59.5% of the vote. The next three most popular parties were the SVP (16.9%), the FDP (13.4%) and the Green Party (5.4%).

The age distribution, as of 2008, in Altishofen is; 337 people or 25.4% of the population is 0–19 years old. 413 people or 31.1% are 20–39 years old, and 424 people or 32% are 40–64 years old. The senior population distribution is 124 people or 9.4% are 65–79 years old, 27 or 2% are 80–89 years old and 1 person or 0.1% of the population are 90+ years old.

In Altishofen about 67.7% of the population (between age 25–64) have completed either non-mandatory upper secondary education or additional higher education (either university or a Fachhochschule).

As of 2000 there are 461 households, of which 131 households (or about 28.4%) contain only a single individual. 65 or about 14.1% are large households, with at least five members. As of 2000 there were 239 inhabited buildings in the municipality, of which 180 were built only as housing, and 59 were mixed use buildings. There were 116 single family homes, 31 double family homes, and 33 multi-family homes in the municipality. Most homes were either two (95) or three (53) story structures. There were only 19 single story buildings and 13 four or more story buildings.

Altishofen has an unemployment rate of 1.7%. As of 2005, there were 67 people employed in the primary economic sector and about 25 businesses involved in this sector. 102 people are employed in the secondary sector and there are 16 businesses in this sector. 1397 people are employed in the tertiary sector, with 40 businesses in this sector. As of 2000 53.6% of the population of the municipality were employed in some capacity. At the same time, females made up 38.5% of the workforce.

In the 2000 census the religious membership of Altishofen was; 959 (75.%) were Roman Catholic, and 100 (7.8%) were Protestant, with an additional 35 (2.74%) that were of some other Christian faith. There are 95 individuals (7.43% of the population) who are Muslim. Of the rest; there were 49 (3.83%) who do not belong to any organized religion, 41 (3.21%) who did not answer the question.

The historical population is given in the following table:

year	population
Um 1695	72 taxed adults ca. 430 total
1798	579
1850	892
1900	710
1950	818
2000	1,279
