= Zell, Lucerne =

Zell
- Municipality
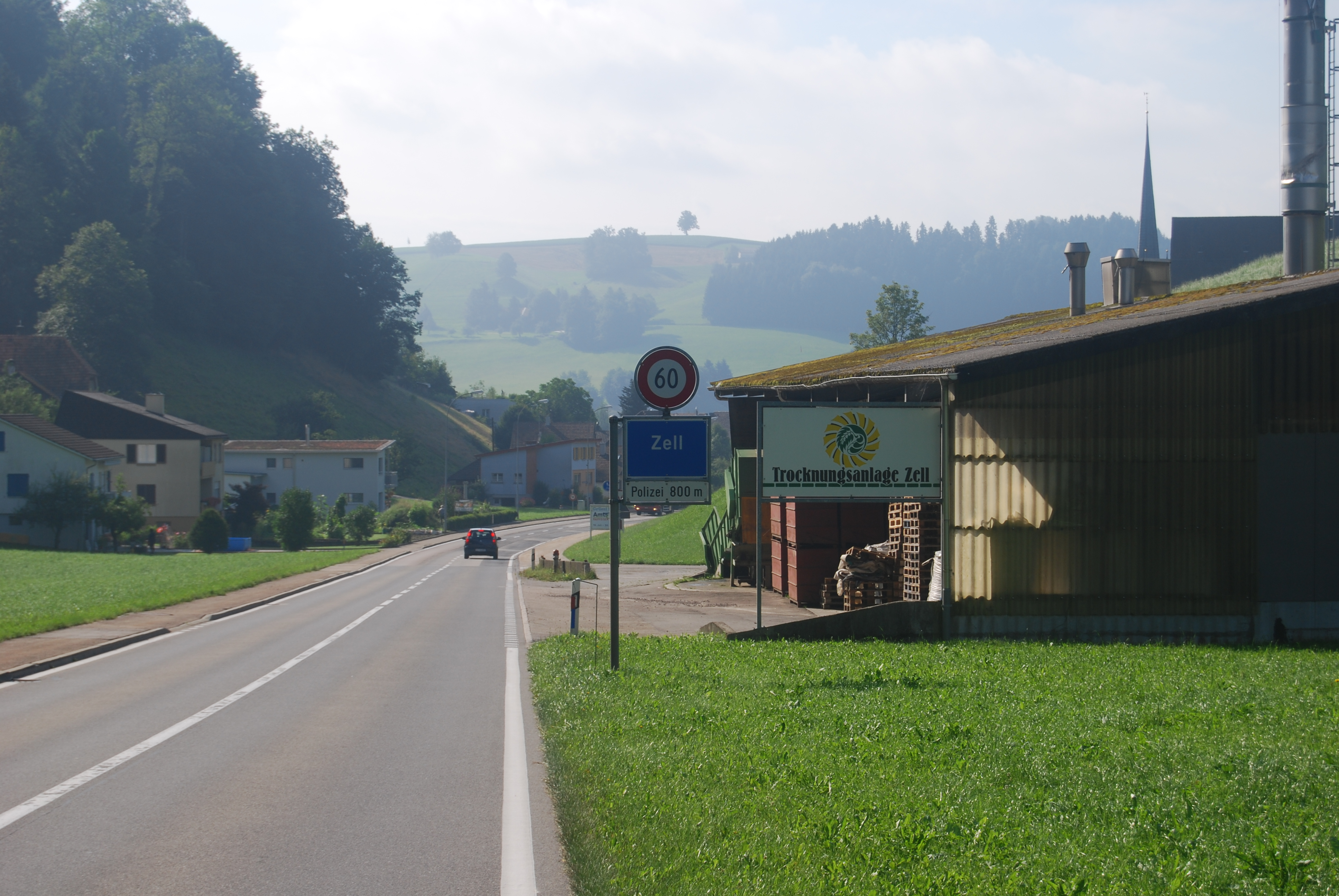

- Flag Coat of arms
- Location of Zell
- Location within Switzerland Location within Canton of Lucerne
- Coordinates: 47°8′N 7°56′E
- Country: Switzerland
- Canton: Lucerne
- District: Willisau

Area
  - Total: 13.87 km^{2} (5.36 sq mi)
- Elevation: 589 m (1,932 ft)

Population (December 2020)
  - Total: 2,108
  - Density: 152.0/km^{2} (393.6/sq mi)
- Time zone: UTC+01:00 (CET)
  - Summer (DST): UTC+02:00 (CEST)
- Postal code: 6144,6152
- SFOS number: 1150
- ISO 3166 code: CH-LU
- Localities: Zell, Briseck, Hüswil, Hällershof, Bründlen, Hünkihof
- Surrounded by: Ebersecken, Fischbach, Gettnau, Ohmstal, Ufhusen, Willisau
- Website: https://www.zell-lu.ch/

Zell (German pronunciation: [tsɛl]) is a municipality in the district of Willisau in the canton of Lucerne in Switzerland.

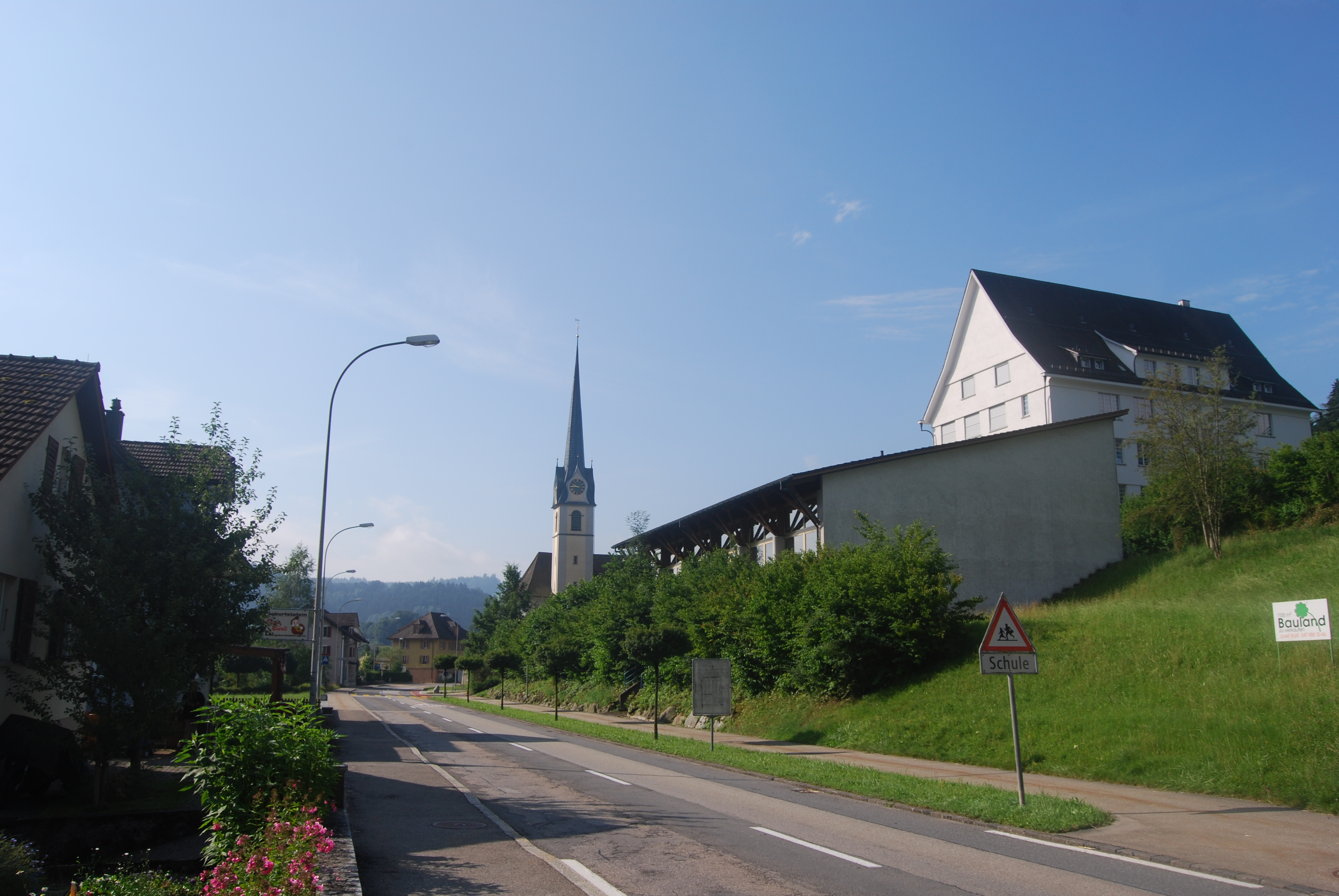
Zell

== Geography ==
Aerial view (1950)

Zell has an area, as of 2006, of 13.9 km^{2} (5.4 sq mi). Of this area, 68% is used for agricultural purposes, while 22.8% is forested. Of the rest of the land, 8.9% is settled (buildings or roads) and the remainder (0.4%) is non-productive (rivers, glaciers or mountains). In the 1997 land survey, 22.78% of the total land area was forested. Of the agricultural land, 64.96% is used for farming or pastures, while 3.03% is used for orchards or vine crops. Of the settled areas, 2.96% is covered with buildings, 1.15% is industrial, 2.02% is classed as special developments, 0.22% is parks or greenbelts and 2.52% is transportation infrastructure. Of the unproductive areas, 0.22% is unproductive flowing water (rivers) and 0.14% is other unproductive land.

== Demographics ==
Zell has a population (as of 31 December 2020) of 2,108. As of 2007, 157 or about 8.2% are not Swiss citizens. Over the last 10 years the population has decreased at a rate of -4.3%. Most of the population (as of 2000) speaks German (94.8%), with Albanian being second most common ( 1.7%) and Portuguese being third ( 0.8%).

In the 2007 election the most popular party was the CVP which received 41.5% of the vote. The next three most popular parties were the FDP (24.5%), the SVP (22.4%) and the SPS (5.1%).

The age distribution, as of 2008, in Zell is; 496 people or 25.8% of the population is 0–19 years old. 503 people or 26.1% are 20–39 years old, and 637 people or 33.1% are 40–64 years old. The senior population distribution is 202 people or 10.5% are 65–79 years old, 77 or 4% are 80–89 years old and 9 people or 0.5% of the population are 90+ years old.

In Zell about 60.8% of the population (between age 25-64) have completed either non-mandatory upper secondary education or additional higher education (either university or a Fachhochschule).

As of 2000 there are 655 households, of which 163 households (or about 24.9%) contain only a single individual. 106 or about 16.2% are large households, with at least five members. As of 2000 there were 392 inhabited buildings in the municipality, of which 256 were built only as housing, and 136 were mixed use buildings. There were 177 single family homes, 42 double family homes, and 37 multi-family homes in the municipality. Most homes were either two (168) or three (54) story structures. There were only 14 single story buildings and 20 four or more story buildings.

Zell has an unemployment rate of 0.82%. As of 2005, there were 164 people employed in the primary economic sector and about 67 businesses involved in this sector. 707 people are employed in the secondary sector and there are 31 businesses in this sector. 468 people are employed in the tertiary sector, with 61 businesses in this sector. As of 2000 50.9% of the population of the municipality were employed in some capacity. At the same time, females made up 40.2% of the workforce.

In the 2000 census the religious membership of Zell was; 1,535 (77.7%) were Roman Catholic, and 309 (15.6%) were Protestant, with an additional 3 (0.15%) that were of some other Christian faith. There are 45 individuals (2.28% of the population) who are Muslim. Of the rest; there were 12 (0.61%) individuals who belong to another religion (not listed), 12 (0.61%) who do not belong to any organized religion, 59 (2.99%) who did not answer the question.
