= Fischbach, Lucerne =

Fischbach
- Municipality
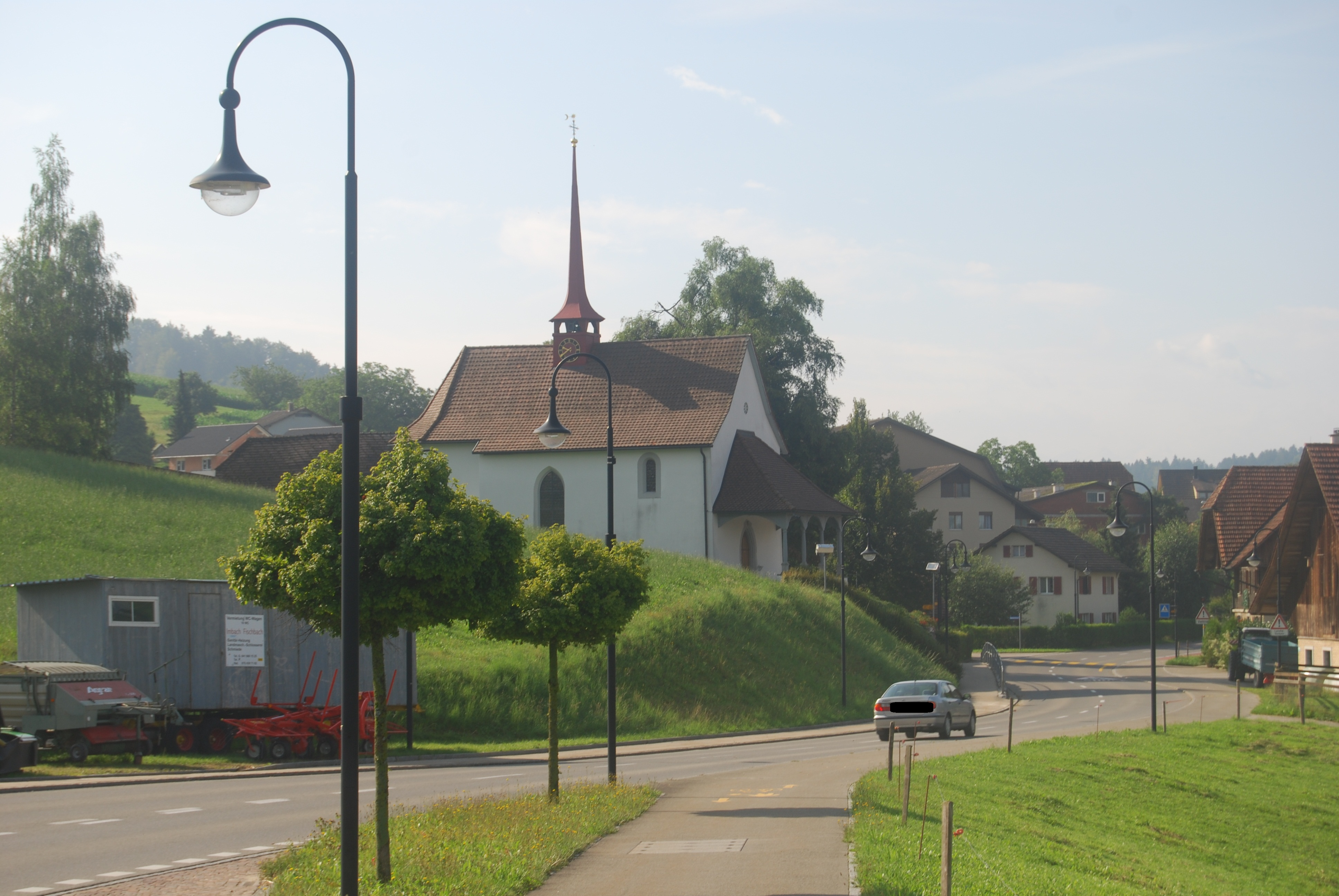

- Flag Coat of arms
- Location of Fischbach
- Location within Switzerland Location within Canton of Lucerne
- Coordinates: 47°9′N 7°54′E
- Country: Switzerland
- Canton: Lucerne
- District: Willisau

Area
  - Total: 8.04 km^{2} (3.10 sq mi)
- Elevation: 637 m (2,090 ft)

Population (December 2008)
  - Total: 716
  - Density: 89.1/km^{2} (231/sq mi)
- Time zone: UTC+01:00 (CET)
  - Summer (DST): UTC+02:00 (CEST)
- Postal code: 6145
- SFOS number: 1129
- ISO 3166 code: CH-LU
- Surrounded by: Ebersecken, Gondiswil (BE), Grossdietwil, Ufhusen, Zell
- Website: http://www.fischbach-lu.ch Profile (in German), SFSO statistics

Fischbach (German pronunciation: [ˈfɪʃbax]) is a municipality in the district of Willisau in the canton of Lucerne in Switzerland.

== History ==
Fischbach is first mentioned in 1224 (802 years ago) as Viscebach.

== Geography ==
Fischbach has an area, as of 2006, of 8.1 km^{2} (3.1 sq mi). Of this area, 80.6% is used for agricultural purposes, while 13.9% is forested. Of the rest of the land, 5.3% is settled (buildings or roads) and the remainder (0.1%) is non-productive (rivers). In the 1997 land survey, 13.81% of the total land area was forested. Of the agricultural land, 76.99% is used for farming or pastures, while 3.73% is used for orchards or vine crops. Of the settled areas, 3.11% is covered with buildings, 0.25% is classed as special developments, and 1.99% is transportation infrastructure.

The municipality is located in the hill country near the Rot river valley.

== Demographics ==
Fischbach has a population as of 2008 of 716, of which 68 or about 9.5% are not Swiss citizens. Over the last 10 years the population has grown at a rate of 2.5%. Most of the population (as of 2000) speaks German (94.0%), with Albanian being second most common ( 3.8%) and Serbo-Croatian being third ( 0.9%).

In the 2007 election the most popular party was the CVP which received 50.7% of the vote. The next three most popular parties were the SVP (30.7%), the FDP (12.7%) and the Green Party (2.7%).

The age distribution, as of 2008, in Fischbach is; 206 people or 28.8% of the population is 0–19 years old. 188 people or 26.3% are 20–39 years old, and 215 people or 30% are 40–64 years old. The senior population distribution is 83 people or 11.6% are 65–79 years old, 18 or 2.5% are 80–89 years old and 6 people or 0.8% of the population are 90+ years old.

The entire Swiss population is generally well educated. In Fischbach about 57% of the population (between age 25-64) have completed either non-mandatory upper secondary education or additional higher education (either university or a Fachhochschule).

As of 2000 there are 223 households, of which 37 households (or about 16.6%) contain only a single individual. 50 or about 22.4% are large households, with at least five members. As of 2000 there were 158 inhabited buildings in the municipality, of which 84 were built only as housing, and 74 were mixed use buildings. There were 61 single family homes, 13 double family homes, and 10 multi-family homes in the municipality. Most homes were either two (43) or three (22) story structures. There were only 15 single story buildings and 4 four or more story buildings.

Fischbach has an unemployment rate of 1.6%. As of 2005, there were 114 people employed in the primary economic sector and about 42 businesses involved in this sector. 49 people are employed in the secondary sector and there are 6 businesses in this sector. 26 people are employed in the tertiary sector, with 8 businesses in this sector. As of 2000 51% of the population of the municipality were employed in some capacity. At the same time, females made up 37% of the workforce.

In the 2000 census the religious membership of Fischbach was; 475 (70.1%) were Roman Catholic, and 122 (18.%) were Protestant, with an additional 6 (0.88%) that were of some other Christian faith. There is 1 individual(0.15% of the population) who is Jewish. There are 37 individuals (5.46% of the population) who are Muslim. Of the rest; there were 2 (0.29%) individuals who belong to another religion (not listed), 15 (2.21%) who do not belong to any organized religion, 20 (2.95%) who did not answer the question.

The historical population is given in the following table:

year	population
about 1695	ca. 300
1798	500
1850	801
1860	693
1870	766
1900	676
1950	761
1990	631
2000	678
