= Ettiswil =

- Municipality
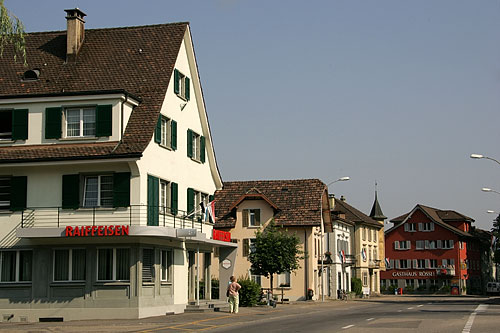

- Coat of arms
- Location of Ettiswil
- Location within Switzerland Location within Canton of Lucerne
- Coordinates: 47°9′N 8°1′E
- Country: Switzerland
- Canton: Lucerne
- District: Willisau

Area
  - Total: 12.51 km^{2} (4.83 sq mi)
- Elevation: 518 m (1,699 ft)

Population (December 2020)
  - Total: 2,792
  - Density: 223.2/km^{2} (578.0/sq mi)
- Time zone: UTC+01:00 (CET)
  - Summer (DST): UTC+02:00 (CEST)
- Postal code: 6218
- SFOS number: 1128
- ISO 3166 code: CH-LU
- Surrounded by: Alberswil, Grosswangen, Mauensee, Schötz, Wauwil, Willisau
- Website: www.ettiswil.ch

Ettiswil is a municipality in the district of Willisau in the canton of Lucerne in Switzerland.

On January 1, 2006 the municipality of Kottwil, lying several kilometres to the northeast, was incorporated into Ettiswil.

== History ==
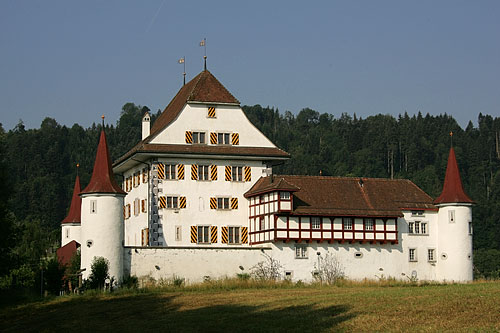
Schloss Wyher near Ettiswil

Ettiswil is first mentioned around 1070-90. It was mentioned between 1217 and 1222 as Ettiswile.

== Geography ==
Aerial view (1962)

Ettiswil has an area, as of 2006, of 12.5 km^{2} (4.8 sq mi). Of this area, 73.7% is used for agricultural purposes, while 17.3% is forested. Of the rest of the land, 8.3% is settled (buildings or roads) and the remainder (0.6%) is non-productive (rivers, glaciers or mountains). In the 1997 land survey, 17.35% of the total land area was forested. Of the agricultural land, 70.82% is used for farming or pastures, while 2.88% is used for orchards or vine crops. Of the settled areas, 5.04% is covered with buildings, 0.24% is industrial, 0.64% is classed as special developments, and 2.4% is transportation infrastructure. Of the unproductive areas, 0.08% is unproductive flowing water (rivers) and 0.56% is other unproductive land.

The municipality is located south of the Wauwilermoos.

== Demographics ==
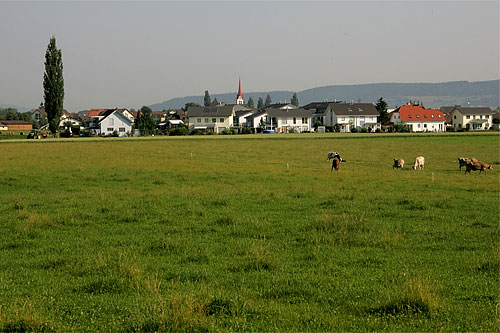
Ettiswil from a nearby field

Ettiswil has a population (as of 31 December 2020) of 2,792. As of 2007, 142 or about 6.2% are not Swiss citizens. Over the last 10 years the population has grown at a rate of 4.6%. Most of the population (as of 2000) speaks German (96.1%), with Albanian being second most common ( 1.7%) and French being third ( 0.3%).

In the 2007 election the most popular party was the CVP which received 39% of the vote. The next three most popular parties were the FDP (30.2%), the SVP (20.7%) and the SPS (5.6%).

The age distribution, as of 2008, in Ettiswil is; 613 people or 27% of the population is 0–19 years old. 606 people or 26.6% are 20–39 years old, and 772 people or 33.9% are 40–64 years old. The senior population distribution is 198 people or 8.7% are 65–79 years old, 74 or 3.3% are 80–89 years old and 11 people or 0.5% of the population are 90+ years old.

The entire Swiss population is generally well educated. In Ettiswil about 69.4% of the population (between age 25-64) have completed either non-mandatory upper secondary education or additional higher education (either university or a Fachhochschule).

As of 2000 there are 740 households, of which 187 households (or about 25.3%) contain only a single individual. 124 or about 16.8% are large households, with at least five members. As of 2000 there were 428 inhabited buildings in the municipality, of which 304 were built only as housing, and 124 were mixed use buildings. There were 200 single family homes, 56 double family homes, and 48 multi-family homes in the municipality. Most homes were either two (178) or three (85) story structures. There were only 28 single story buildings and 13 four or more story buildings.

Ettiswil has an unemployment rate of 1.22%. As of 2005, there were 184 people employed in the primary economic sector and about 70 businesses involved in this sector. 191 people are employed in the secondary sector and there are 34 businesses in this sector. 306 people are employed in the tertiary sector, with 36 businesses in this sector. As of 2000 54.3% of the population of the municipality were employed in some capacity. At the same time, females made up 42% of the workforce.

In the 2000 census the religious membership of Ettiswil was; 1,837 (86.6%) were Roman Catholic, and 103 (4.9%) were Protestant, with an additional 17 (0.8%) that were of some other Christian faith. There are 2 individuals (0.09% of the population) who are Jewish. There are 37 individuals (1.74% of the population) who are Muslim. Of the rest; there were 12 (0.57%) individuals who belong to another religion (not listed), 52 (2.45%) who do not belong to any organized religion, 61 (2.88%) who did not answer the question.

The historical population is given in the following table:

year	population
Um 1695	ca. 450
1798	622
1850	1,015
1900	707
1950	920
1970	1,062
1990	1,509
2000	1,735
