= Roggliswil =

- Municipality
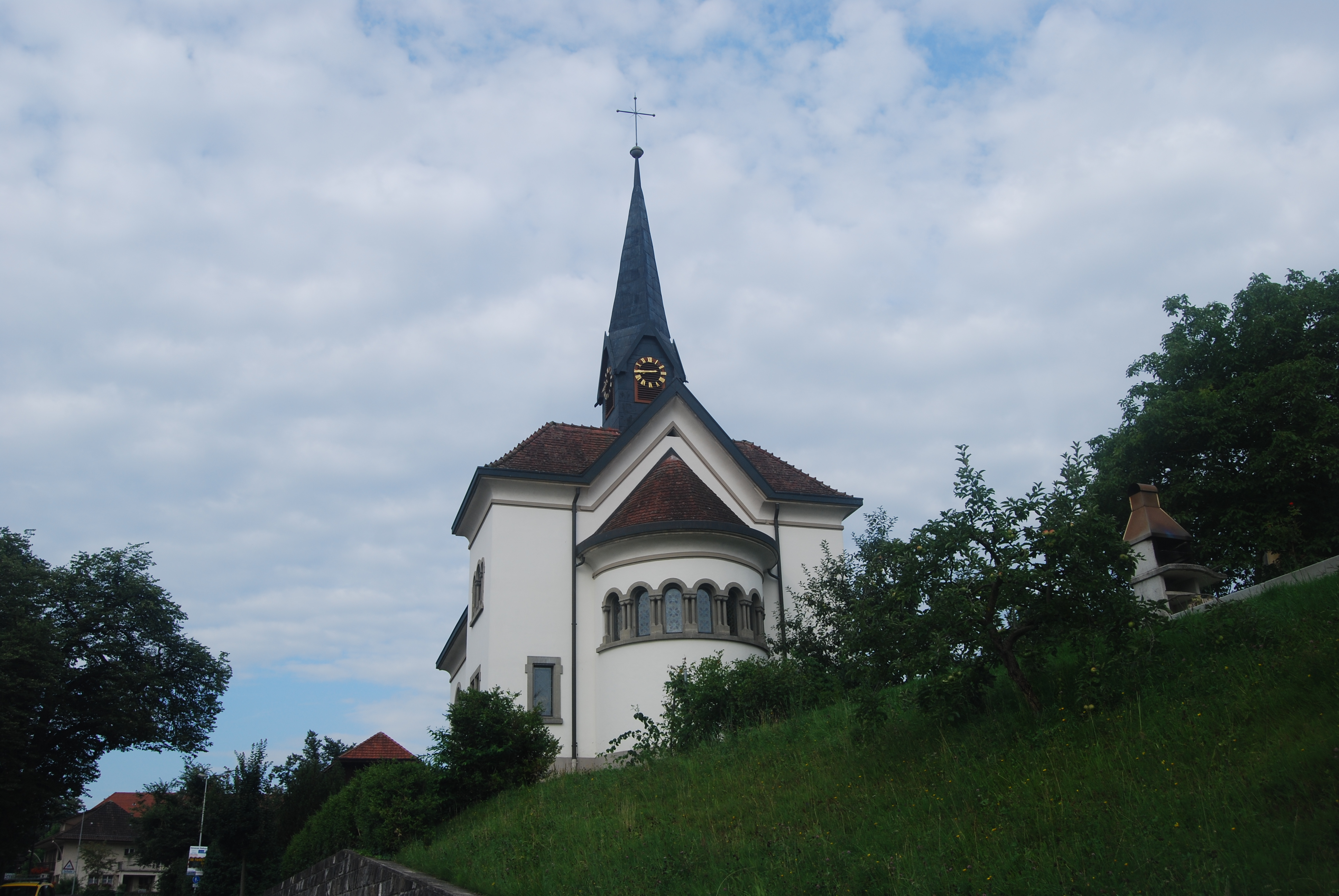

- Coat of arms
- Location of Roggliswil
- Location within Switzerland Location within Canton of Lucerne
- Coordinates: 47°13′N 7°53′E
- Country: Switzerland
- Canton: Lucerne
- District: Willisau

Area
  - Total: 6.22 km^{2} (2.40 sq mi)
- Elevation: 560 m (1,840 ft)

Population (December 2020)
  - Total: 723
  - Density: 116/km^{2} (301/sq mi)
- Time zone: UTC+01:00 (CET)
  - Summer (DST): UTC+02:00 (CEST)
- Postal code: 6265
- SFOS number: 1142
- ISO 3166 code: CH-LU
- Surrounded by: Altbüron, Grossdietwil, Pfaffnau
- Website: https://www.roggliswil.ch Profile (in German), SFSO statistics

Roggliswil is a municipality in the district of Willisau in the canton of Lucerne in Switzerland.

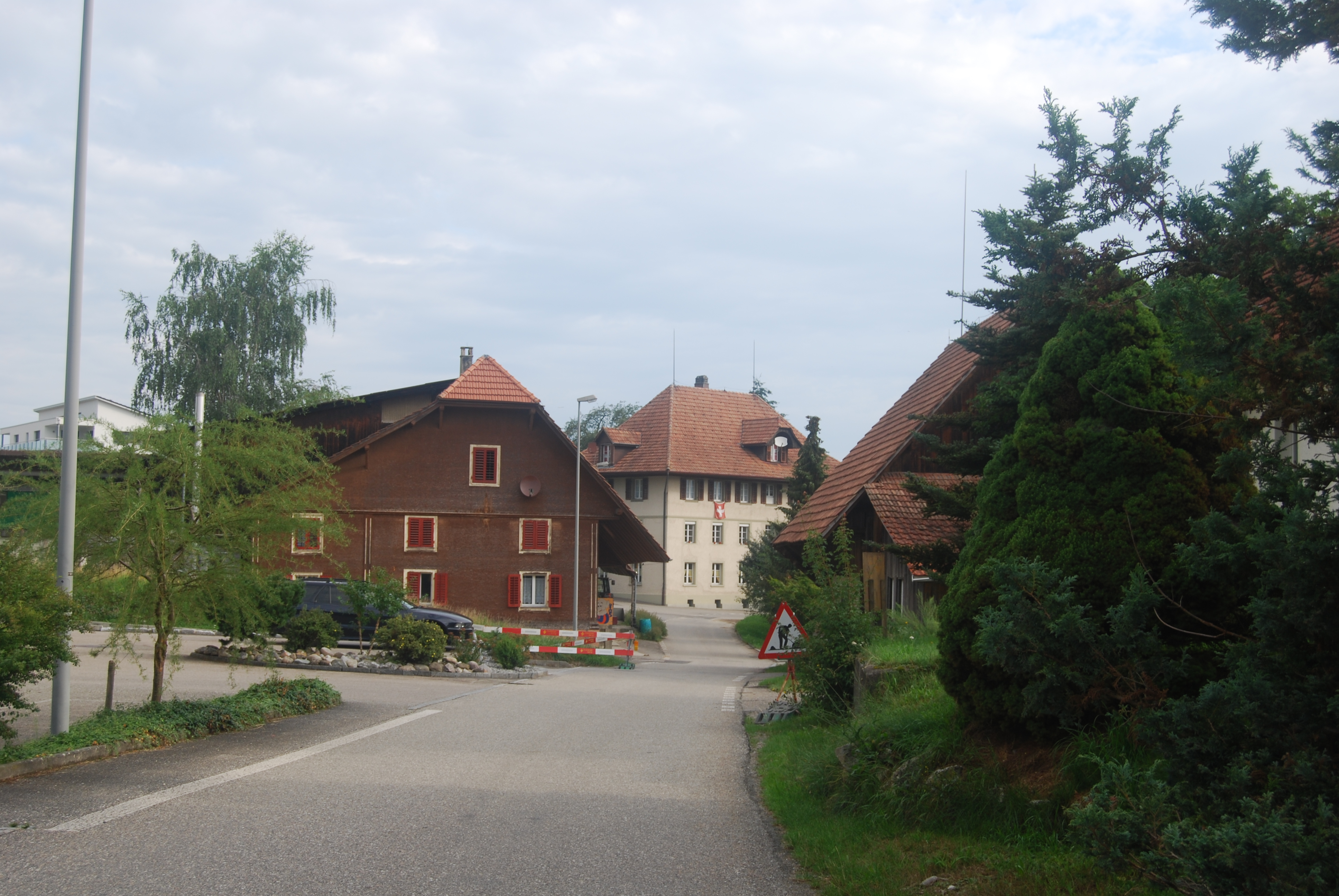
Roggliswil

== Geography ==
Aerial view (1953)

Roggliswil has an area, as of 2006, of 6.2 km^{2} (2.4 sq mi). Of this area, 66% is used for agricultural purposes, while 27.6% is forested. Of the rest of the land, 6.1% is settled (buildings or roads) and the remainder (0.3%) is non-productive rivers. In the 1997 land survey, 27.49% of the total land area was forested. Of the agricultural land, 61.09% is used for farming or pastures, while 4.98% is used for orchards or vine crops. Of the settled areas, 2.89% is covered with buildings, 0.32% is industrial, 0.16% is classed as special developments, and 2.73% is transportation infrastructure.

== Demographics ==
Roggliswil has a population (as of 31 December 2020) of 723. As of 2007, 16 or about 2.5% are not Swiss citizens. Over the last 10 years the population has decreased at a rate of -1.8%. Most of the population (as of 2000) speaks German (96.3%), with Albanian being second most common (2.0%) and French being third (0.6%).

In the 2007 election the most popular party was the CVP which received 35.7% of the vote. The next three most popular parties were the FDP (31.6%), the SVP (18.6%) and the SPS (5.3%).

The age distribution, as of 2008, in Roggliswil is; 175 people or 27.3% of the population is 0–19 years old. 151 people or 23.6% are 20–39 years old, and 199 people or 31.1% are 40–64 years old. The senior population distribution is 81 people or 12.7% are 65–79 years old, 29 or 4.5% are 80–89 years old and 5 people or 0.8% of the population are 90+ years old.

In Roggliswil about 66.3% of the population (between age 25-64) have completed either non-mandatory upper secondary education or additional higher education (either university or a Fachhochschule).

As of 2000 there are 214 households, of which 43 households (or about 20.1%) contain only a single individual. 47 or about 22.0% are large households, with at least five members. As of 2000 there were 151 inhabited buildings in the municipality, of which 82 were built only as housing, and 69 were mixed use buildings. There were 60 single family homes, 13 double family homes, and 9 multi-family homes in the municipality. Most homes were either two (57) or three (10) story structures. There were only 10 single story buildings and 5 four or more story buildings.

Roggliswil has an unemployment rate of 0.37%. As of 2005, there were 104 people employed in the primary economic sector and about 36 businesses involved in this sector. 81 people are employed in the secondary sector and there are 11 businesses in this sector. 74 people are employed in the tertiary sector, with 19 businesses in this sector. As of 2000 44.9% of the population of the municipality were employed in some capacity. At the same time, females made up 37.8% of the workforce.

In the 2000 census the religious membership of Roggliswil was; 538 (83.%) were Roman Catholic, and 55 (8.5%) were Protestant, with an additional 2 (0.31%) that were of some other Christian faith. There are 14 individuals (2.16% of the population) who are Muslim. Of the rest; there were 17 (2.62%) who do not belong to any organized religion, 22 (3.4%) who did not answer the question.

== Notable people ==
- Mathias Frank (born 9 December 1986) is a Swiss road bicycle racer for UCI World Tour Team IAM Cycling.
