= Willisau District =

Coordinates: 47°7′N 7°59′E

Willisau District Wahlkreis Willisau
- District
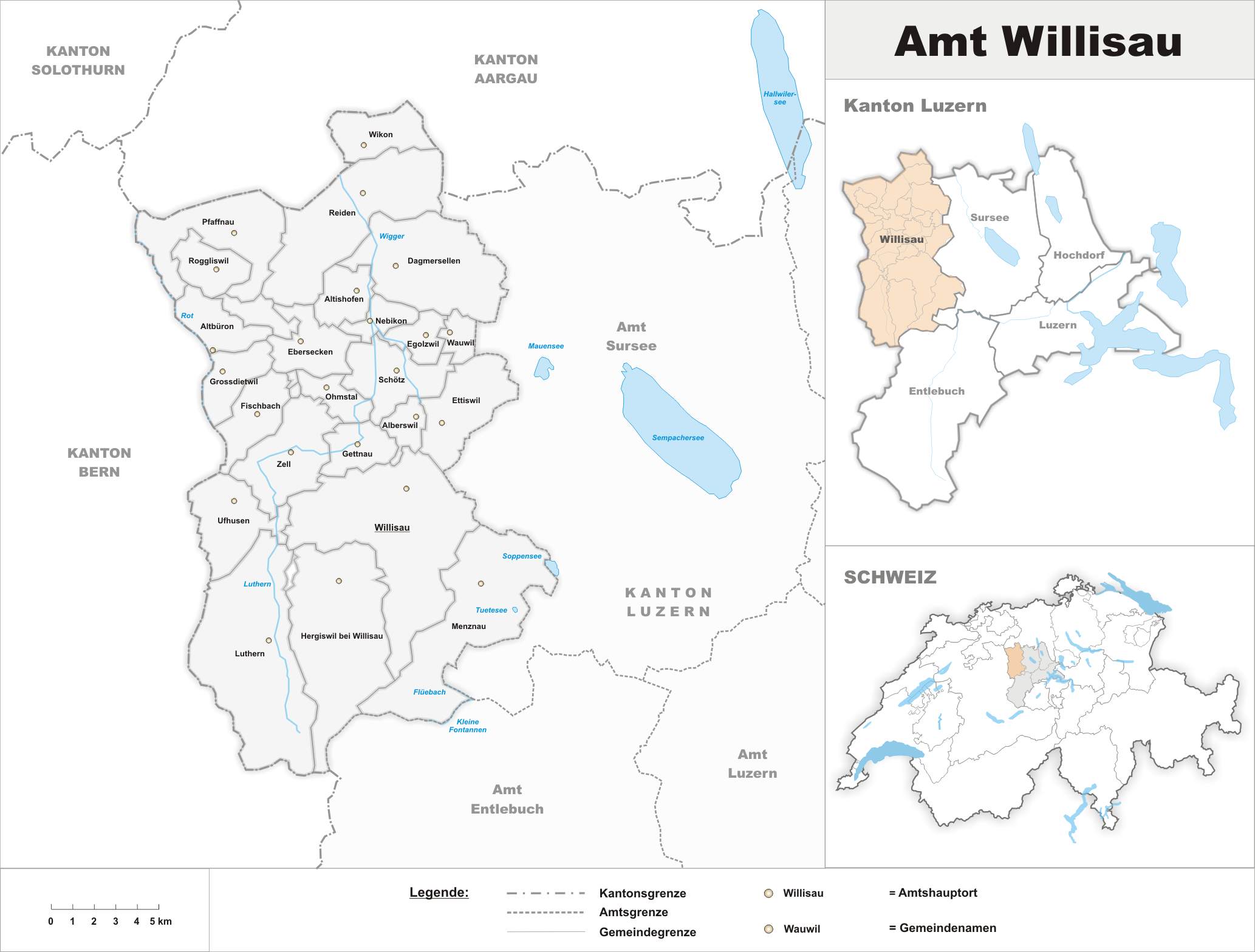
- Country: Switzerland
- Canton: Luzern
- Capital: Willisau

Area
  - Total: 336.99 km^{2} (130.11 sq mi)

Population (2020)
  - Total: 55,079
  - Density: 163.44/km^{2} (423.32/sq mi)
- Time zone: UTC+1 (CET)
  - Summer (DST): UTC+2 (CEST)
- Municipalities: 21

Willisau District is one of the five districts (German: Ämter) of the German-speaking Canton of Lucerne, Switzerland. Its capital is the town of Willisau. It has a population of 55,079 (as of 31 December 2020). In 2013 its name was changed from Amt Willisau to Wahlkreis Willisau as part of a reorganization of the canton. A sixth Wahlkreis was created, but in Willisau everything else remained essentially unchanged.

Willisau District consists of the following municipalities:

Municipality	Population (31 December 2020)	Area, km^{2}
Alberswil	665	3.6
Altbüron	1,017	6.8
Altishofen	1,959	5.7
Dagmersellen	5,680	23.9
Egolzwil	1,530	4.2
Ettiswil	2,792	12.5
Fischbach	702	8.1
Grossdietwil	855	10.2
Hergiswil bei Willisau	1,908	31.3
Luthern	1,245	37.9
Menznau	2,966	30.4
Nebikon	2,713	3.7
Pfaffnau	2,674	17.6
Reiden	7,255	27.0
Roggliswil	723	6.2
Schötz	4,575	15.27
Ufhusen	927	12.3
Wauwil	2,380	2.9
Wikon	1,495	8.3
Willisau	7,752	47.22
Zell	2,108	13.9
Total	55,079	336.99^{a}

^a 1992/97 survey gives a total area of 337.45 km^{2} (130.29 sq mi) without including certain large lakes, while the 2000 survey includes lakes but due to other changes is slightly lower.

== Mergers ==
- On 1 January 2020 the former municipality of Ebersecken merged into Altishofen.
- On 1 January 2021 the former municipality of Gettnau merged into Willisau.
