= Schötz =

- Municipality
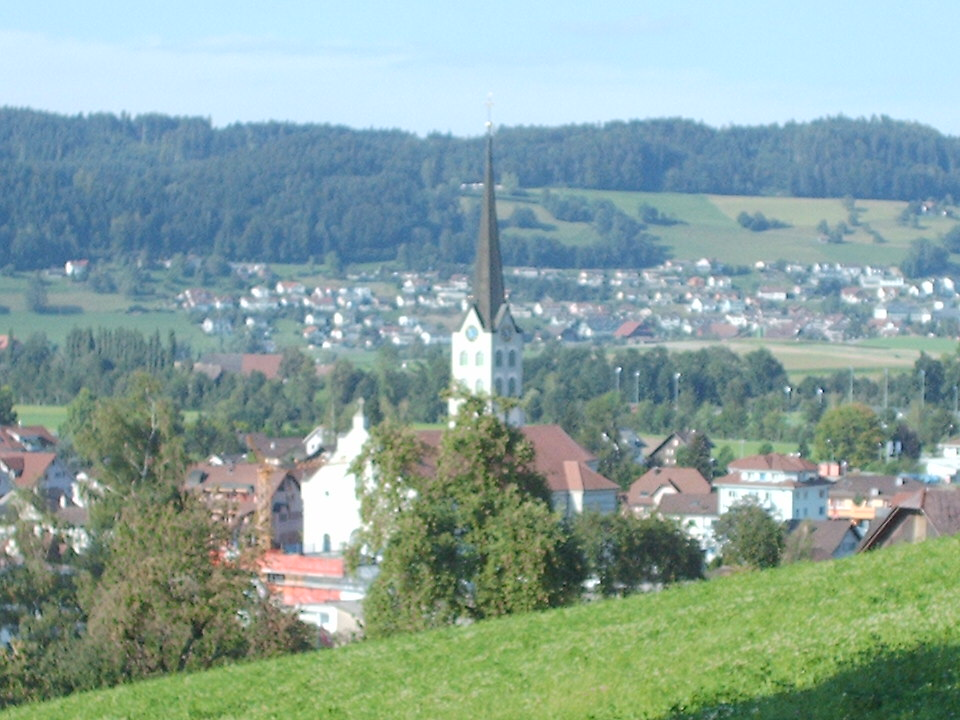

- Coat of arms
- Location of Schötz
- Location within Switzerland Location within Canton of Lucerne
- Coordinates: 47°10′N 7°59′E
- Country: Switzerland
- Canton: Lucerne
- District: Willisau

Area
  - Total: 10.84 km^{2} (4.19 sq mi)
- Elevation: 504 m (1,654 ft)

Population (December 2020)
  - Total: 4,575
  - Density: 422.0/km^{2} (1,093/sq mi)
- Time zone: UTC+01:00 (CET)
  - Summer (DST): UTC+02:00 (CEST)
- Postal code: 6247
- SFOS number: 1143
- ISO 3166 code: CH-LU
- Surrounded by: Alberswil, Ebersecken, Egolzwil, Ettiswil, Gettnau, Nebikon, Ohmstal, Wauwil
- Website: www.schoetz.ch

Schötz is a municipality in the district of Willisau in the canton of Lucerne in Switzerland. On 1 January 2013 the former municipality of Ohmstal merged into the municipality of Schötz.

== Geography ==
Aerial view (1957)

Schötz has an area, as of 2006, of 15.27 km^{2} (5.90 sq mi). Of this area, 69.3% is used for agricultural purposes, while 17.9% is forested. Of the rest of the land, 10.9% is settled (buildings or roads) and the remainder (1.9%) is non-productive (rivers, glaciers or mountains). In the 1997 land survey, 17.87% of the total land area was forested. Of the agricultural land, 67.55% is used for farming or pastures, while 1.74% is used for orchards or vine crops. Of the settled areas, 4.31% is covered with buildings, 1.19% is industrial, 0.55% is classed as special developments, 0.55% is parks or greenbelts and 4.31% is transportation infrastructure. Of the unproductive areas, 0.09% is unproductive standing water (ponds or lakes), 0.37% is unproductive flowing water (rivers) and 1.47% is other unproductive land.

== Demographics ==
Schötz has a population (as of 31 December 2020) of 4,575. As of 2007, 512 or about 15.2% are not Swiss citizens. Over the last 10 years the population has grown at a rate of 14.5%. Most of the population (as of 2000) speaks German (91.1%), with Albanian being second most common ( 3.2%) and Serbo-Croatian being third ( 1.4%).

In the 2007 election the most popular party was the CVP which received 43.2% of the vote. The next three most popular parties were the SVP (23.9%), the FDP (20.5%) and the Green Party (6.1%).

The age distribution, as of 2008, in Schötz is; 912 people or 27% of the population is 0–19 years old. 959 people or 28.4% are 20–39 years old, and 1,102 people or 32.7% are 40–64 years old. The senior population distribution is 297 people or 8.8% are 65–79 years old, 90 or 2.7% are 80–89 years old and 12 people or 0.4% of the population are 90+ years old.

In Schötz about 65.5% of the population (between age 25-64) have completed either non-mandatory upper secondary education or additional higher education (either university or a Fachhochschule).

As of 2000 there are 1,130 households, of which 320 households (or about 28.3%) contain only a single individual. 142 or about 12.6% are large households, with at least five members. As of 2000 there were 580 inhabited buildings in the municipality, of which 433 were built only as housing, and 147 were mixed use buildings. There were 302 single family homes, 66 double family homes, and 65 multi-family homes in the municipality. Most homes were either two (253) or three (102) story structures. There were only 40 single story buildings and 38 four or more story buildings.

Schötz has an unemployment rate of 2.28%. As of 2005, there were 155 people employed in the primary economic sector and about 51 businesses involved in this sector. 576 people are employed in the secondary sector and there are 47 businesses in this sector. 583 people are employed in the tertiary sector, with 88 businesses in this sector. As of 2000 50% of the population of the municipality were employed in some capacity. At the same time, females made up 39.6% of the workforce.

In the 2000 census the religious membership of Schötz was; 2,482 (81.%) were Roman Catholic, and 225 (7.3%) were Protestant, with an additional 39 (1.27%) that were of some other Christian faith. There are 151 individuals (4.93% of the population) who are Muslim. Of the rest; there were 14 (0.46%) individuals who belong to another religion (not listed), 82 (2.68%) who do not belong to any organized religion, 72 (2.35%) who did not answer the question.

== Sport ==
FC Schötz is the municipality's football team.
