= Alberswil =

- Municipality
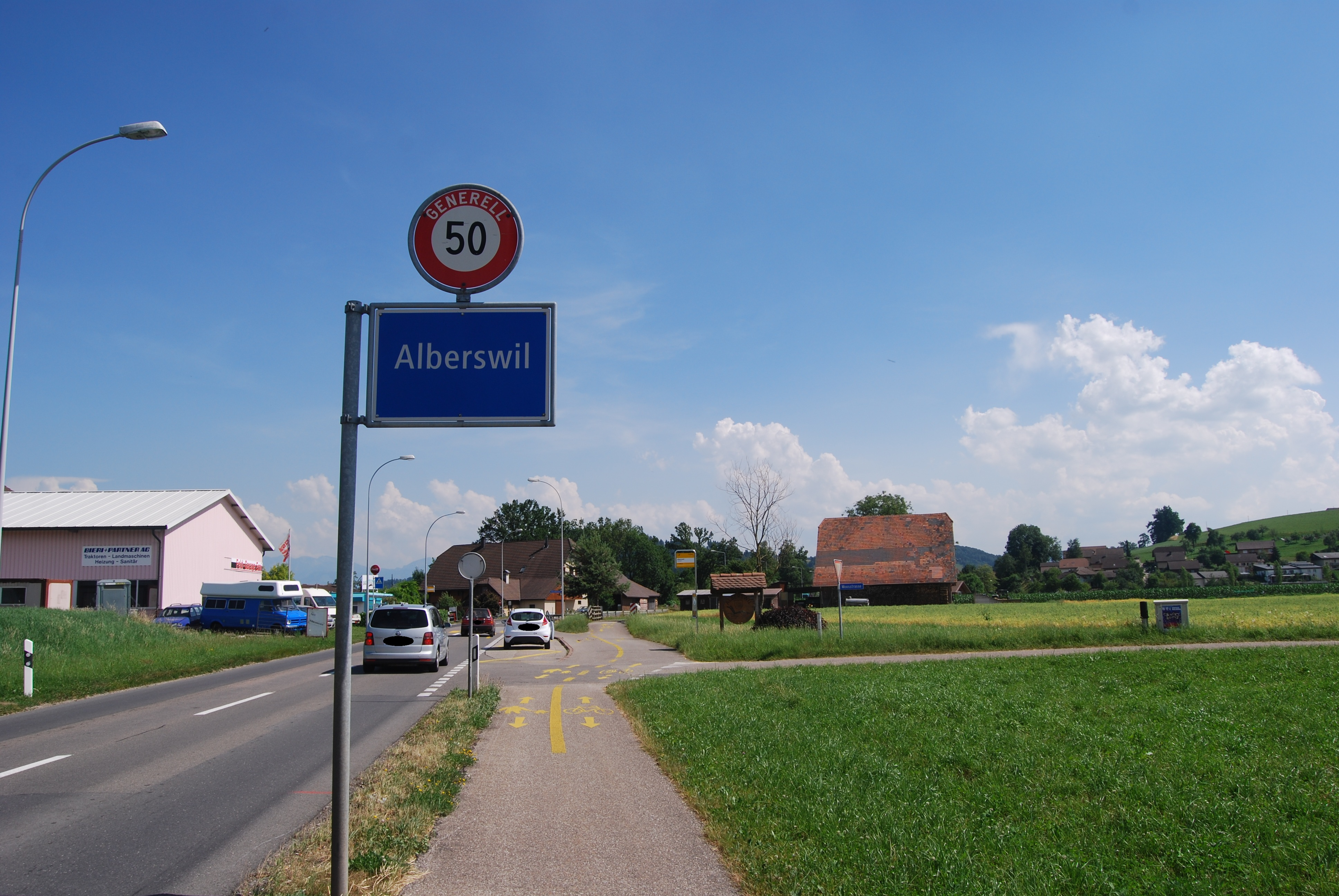

- Coat of arms
- Location of Alberswil
- Location within Switzerland Location within Canton of Lucerne
- Coordinates: 47°9′N 8°0′E
- Country: Switzerland
- Canton: Lucerne
- District: Willisau

Area
  - Total: 3.58 km^{2} (1.38 sq mi)
- Elevation: 521 m (1,709 ft)

Population (December 2020)
  - Total: 665
  - Density: 186/km^{2} (481/sq mi)
- Time zone: UTC+01:00 (CET)
  - Summer (DST): UTC+02:00 (CEST)
- Postal code: 6248
- SFOS number: 1121
- ISO 3166 code: CH-LU
- Surrounded by: Ettiswil, Gettnau, Schötz, Willisau
- Website: www.alberswil.ch

Alberswil is a municipality in the district of Willisau in the canton of Lucerne in Switzerland.

== History ==
Alberswil is first mentioned around 1220 as Alberswile.

== Geography ==
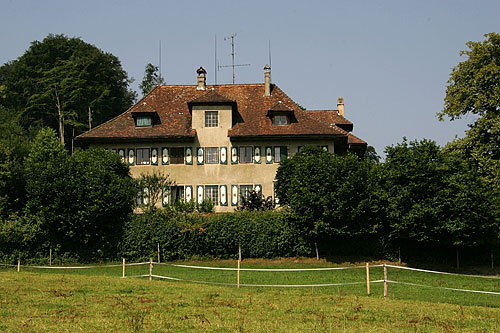
Schloss Kasteln

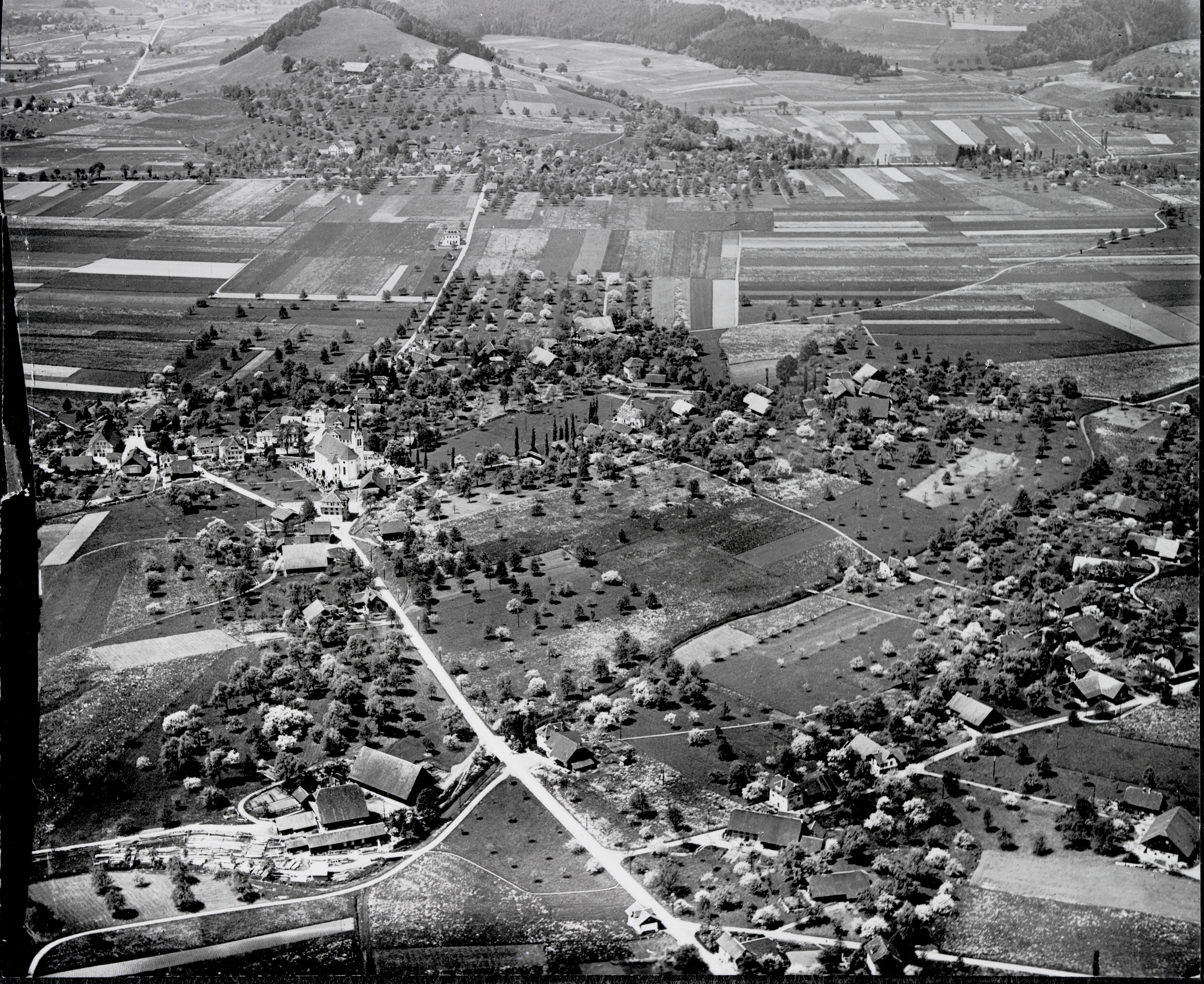
Aerial view from 300 m by Walter Mittelholzer (1931)

Alberswil has an area, as of 2006, of 3.6 km^{2} (1.4 sq mi). Of this area, 73.9% is used for agricultural purposes, while 18.3% is forested. Of the rest of the land, 7.6% is settled (buildings or roads) and the remainder (0.3%) is non-productive (classed as other, not water, unproductive land). In the 1997 land survey, 18.16% of the total land area was forested. Of the agricultural land, 70.95% is used for farming or pastures, while 2.79% is used for orchards or vine crops. Of the settled areas, 3.35% is covered with buildings, 0.56% is industrial, 0.56% is classed as special developments, and 3.35% is transportation infrastructure.

The municipality is located on the edge of the Wauwilermoos bog. It consists of the linear village of Alberswil, the hamlet of Burgrain and Schloss (castle) Kasteln.

== Demographics ==
Alberswil has a population (as of 31 December 2020) of 665. As of 2007, 65 or about 11.4% are not Swiss citizens. Over the last 10 years the population has grown at a rate of 10.7%. Most of the population (as of 2000) speaks German (91.4%), with Albanian being second most common ( 4.6%) and Turkish being third ( 1.9%).

In the 2007 election the most popular party was the CVP which received 41.8% of the vote. The next three most popular parties were the FDP (30.5%), the SVP (17.7%) and the Green Party (7%).

The age distribution, as of 2008, in Alberswil is; 159 people or 27.8% of the population is 0–19 years old. 165 people or 28.8% are 20–39 years old, and 185 people or 32.3% are 40–64 years old. The senior population distribution is 43 people or 7.5% are 65–79 years old, 18 or 3.1% are 80–89 years old and 2 people or 0.3% of the population are 90+ years old.

In Alberswil about 57.8% of the population (between age 25-64) have completed either non-mandatory upper secondary education or additional higher education (either university or a Fachhochschule).

As of 2000 there are 186 households, of which 43 households (or about 23.1%) contain only a single individual. 29 or about 15.6% are large households, with at least five members. As of 2000 there were 113 inhabited buildings in the municipality, of which 88 were built only as housing, and 25 were mixed use buildings. There were 66 single family homes, 12 double family homes, and 10 multi-family homes in the municipality. Most homes were either two (54) or three (19) story structures. There were only 10 single story buildings and 5 four or more story buildings.

Alberswil has an unemployment rate of 0.48%. As of 2005, there were 41 people employed in the primary economic sector and about 14 businesses involved in this sector. 25 people are employed in the secondary sector and there are 10 businesses in this sector. 42 people are employed in the tertiary sector, with 12 businesses in this sector. As of 2000 55.3% of the population of the municipality were employed in some capacity. At the same time, females made up 42.6% of the workforce.

In the 2000 census the religious membership of Alberswil was; 413 (79.%) were Roman Catholic, and 49 (9.4%) were Protestant, with an additional 8 (1.53%) that were of some other Christian faith. There are 22 individuals (4.21% of the population) who are Muslim. Of the rest; there were 14 (2.68%) who do not belong to any organized religion, 17 (3.25%) who did not answer the question.

The historical population is given in the following table:

year	population
about 1695	ca. 198
1798	279
1816	397
1850	429
1900	439
1950	403
2000	523
