= Wauwilermoos =

- Wauwilermoos (moor), a bog respectively drained lake in the canton of Luzern in Switzerland.

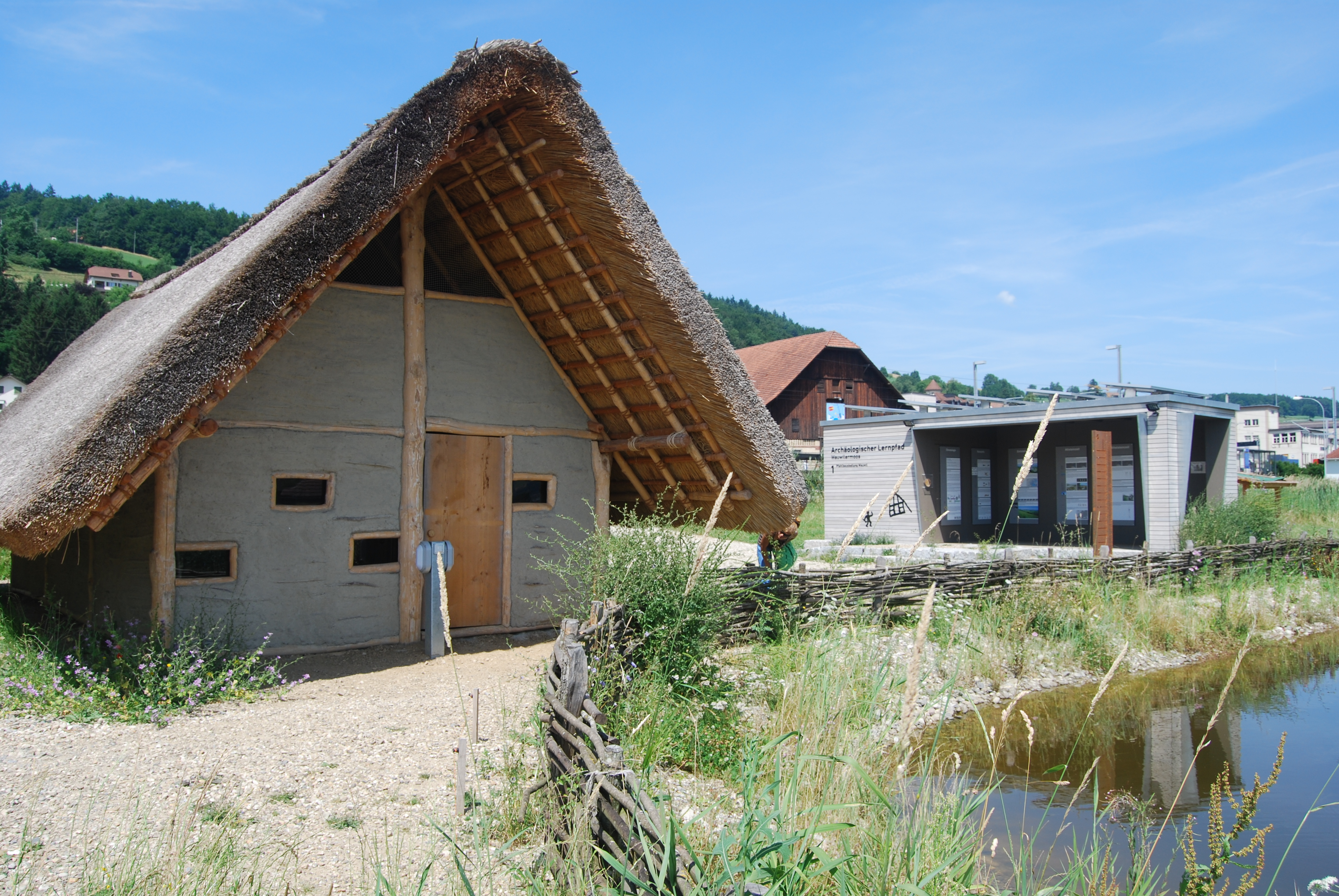
Wauwil arkeologia lernopado

- Wauwilermoos internment camp, an internment respectively a Prisoner-of-war camp during World War II in Switzerland, situated in the municipalities of Wauwil and Egolzwil.
- Wauwilermoos pile dwelling settlement, also known as Egolzwil 3, one of the 111 serial sites of the UNESCO World Heritage Site Prehistoric pile dwellings around the Alps.
