= Wauwilermoos (moor) =

Moor plain in the canton of Lucerne

- Moor plain
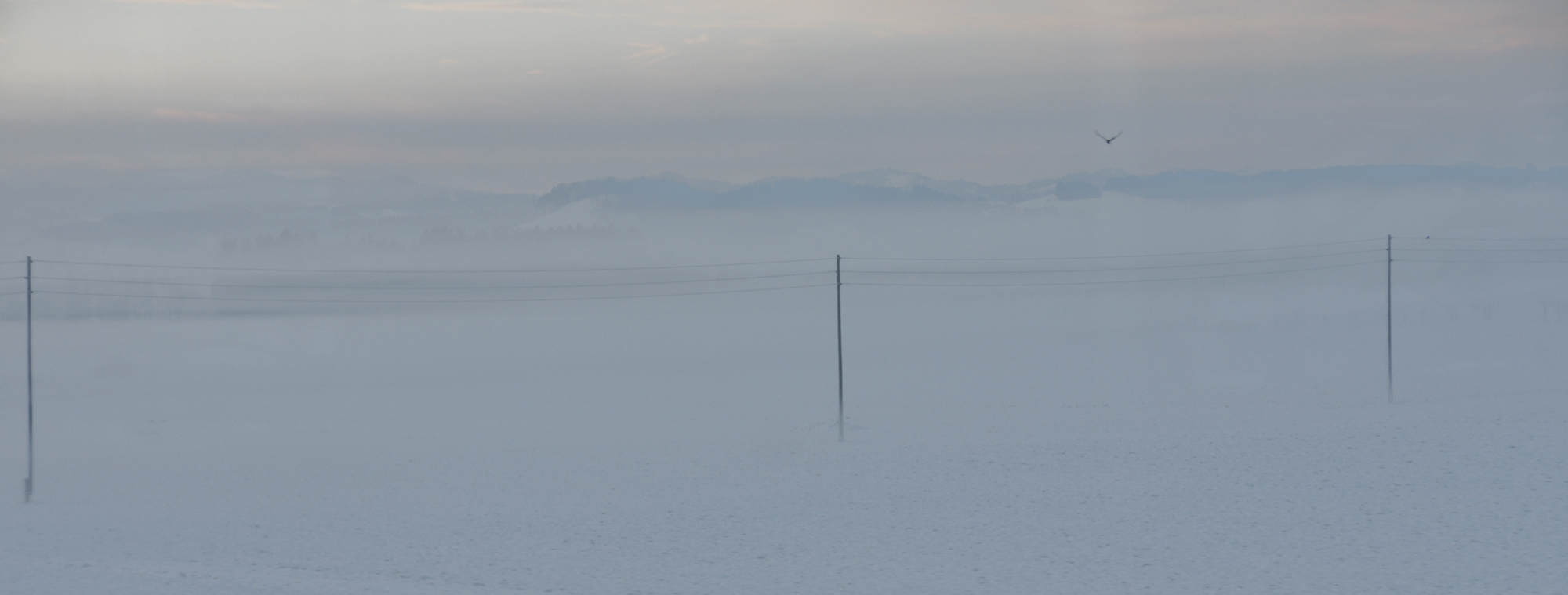
- The Wauwilermoos in morning fog
- Interactive map of Wauwilermoos
- Coordinates: 47.178955°N 8.026082°E
- Location: Wauwil, Egolzwil and Schötz, canton of Lucerne, Switzerland

The Wauwilermoos is a moor plain in the municipalities of Wauwil, Egolzwil and Schötz in the canton of Lucerne, Switzerland. Peat was cut there from 1820, and after the former lake, the Wauwilersee, was drained in the mid-19th century, the first Stone Age settlements came to light. The plain became known as an archaeological region; at the beginning of the 21st century more than 120 Stone Age sites were known there, among them Egolzwil 3, the eponymous site of the Neolithic Egolzwil culture.

== Research history ==
In the Wauwilermoos, where peat was cut from 1820, the first Stone Age settlements came to light after the lake was drained in the mid-19th century. The excavations carried out up to 1929 made the Wauwil plain (Wauwilerebene) known as an archaeological region. Research by scientific standards, however, began only with the excavations led by Hans Reinerth in the early 1930s at Schötz and at the Neolithic site of Egolzwil E 2. Emil Vogt gave research new impetus with his systematic excavations of the settlement sites E 3, E 4 and E 5 in 1950–1966. After the excavations under René Wyss in 1965 and 1985–1988, eleven Neolithic and 30 Mesolithic sites were known in the Wauwilermoos, and at the beginning of the 21st century more than 120 Stone Age sites were known on the Wauwil plain.

== Prehistoric settlement ==
The first human settlements after the retreat of the Reuss Glacier, which has not yet been precisely dated, are attested at six sites from before 13,000 BC. Forty-six sites on an old, raised shoreline of the former lake date from the Late Paleolithic (about 12,000–9000 BC); their artifacts, with many burins as well as typical backed points and broad flake scrapers, are attributed to the Fürsteiner culture.

The characteristic small flint tools (microliths) of the Early Mesolithic (about 9000–6700 BC) are attested at 33 sites, and finds from the Late Mesolithic (about 6700–5500 BC) are documented at more than 20 places. At the settlement of Schötz Station 7 (Rorbelmoos), an improved technique for working flint and new types of tools can be observed. Cereal pollen in layers dated to around 6500 BC points to possible crop growing in the Late Mesolithic, but two potsherds from unclear contexts and a Bavans point, found at two different sites, are hardly enough to prove a Neolithic farming culture in the 5th millennium BC.

For the well-documented Egolzwil culture of shortly after 4300 BC, four other settlement sites are attested besides the eponymous site of Egolzwil E 3. A short-lived village was built at ground level in the silting-up zone of the lake. Ash, oak and alder were used as building timber, and a hearth in the middle of the house provided light and warmth. The handmade pottery consisted mostly of round-bottomed pots and bowls with two handle lugs and an average capacity of 1.8 to 2.8 liters, along with some containers for liquids holding 6 to 8 liters and a few Wauwil beakers (Wauwilerbecher). Unique finds are sickles with a straight wooden haft and an obliquely projecting flint blade set in birch-tar pitch, as well as axe hafts, clubs, furrow sticks and a textile container for ornaments with shells from the Mediterranean.

Between 3900 and 3500 BC the lakeshore settlements of the Cortaillod culture arose, fenced off on the landward side. In the superimposed settlements at Egolzwil E 4, the later buildings seem to have been raised slightly off the ground on a substructure of several layers of beams. The same had already been observed at the earlier-excavated sites of Egolzwil E 1 and E 2; it is connected with a rise in the lake level, possibly caused by the climate. The Horgen culture (3500–2700 BC) is represented at three sites, among them the island in the Mauensee, and the Corded Ware culture (2700–2500 BC) at four sites.

Mostly isolated finds are known from the Bronze Age. Remains of Late Bronze Age settlements have been found on the island in the Mauensee and at Wauwil Glasi. A hoard of iron tools, pottery vessels and gold coins dates from the later Iron Age (the La Tène period, about 480/450–30 BC). In Roman times there is no longer any evidence of settlements on the plain.

== Bibliography ==
- J. Speck, "Zur Siedlungsgeschichte des Wauwilermooses", in Die ersten Bauern, vol. 1, 1990, pp. 255–270
- R. Wyss, Steinzeitliche Bauern auf der Suche nach neuen Lebensformen: Egolzwil 3 und die Egolzwiler Kultur, 2 vols., 1994–1996
- J. Bill, "Die Wauwiler Ebene als Siedlungsraum von der Jungsteinzeit bis zu den Römern", in Mitteilungen der Naturforschenden Gesellschaft Luzern 36, 1999, pp. 49–66
- E. H. Nielsen, Paläolithikum und Mesolithikum in der Zentralschweiz, 2009
- A. de Capitani, Egolzwil 3, 2013
