= Margarita Primas =

Swiss archaeologist (1935–2025)

- Born: Selina Margaritha Priti Frauenfelder; June 18, 1935; Bülach, Switzerland
- Died: February 28, 2025 (aged 89)
- Occupation: Archaeologist
- Employer: University of Zurich
- Spouse: Hans Primas (m. 1962)

Margarita Primas (born Selina Margaritha Priti Frauenfelder; 18 June 1935 – 28 February 2025) was a Swiss prehistoric archaeologist and professor at the University of Zurich, known for her research on the Bronze Age and Iron Age in the Alpine world.

== Biography ==
Margarita Primas was born on 18 June 1935 in Bülach, the daughter of Ernst Friedrich Frauenfelder, a teacher, and Selina Meili. She was Protestant and originally from Adlikon, later acquiring citizenship of Zurich upon her marriage. In 1962, she married Hans Primas, professor of physical and quantum chemistry.

She studied prehistoric archaeology at the University of Zurich, earning her doctorate in 1966 under the supervision of Emil Vogt, and her habilitation in 1974. From 1976 to 2000, she taught at the University of Zurich, initially as an associate professor (extraordinaria) and then as a full professor (ordinaria) from 1987. During this period she developed the university's section of pre- and protohistory (archaeology). In 1988–1989, she also led a tumulus excavation project in Montenegro.

Primas published numerous articles on the Iron Age and the Alpine world before turning her attention to the Bronze Age, a field in which she became a recognized specialist at the European level.

== Bibliography ==
- B. Schmid-Sikimić, Ph. Della Casa, ed., Trans Europam, 1995 (with list of works by Primas)
