= Aerial incidents in Switzerland in World War II =

Violations of Switzerland's airspace during the Second World War

- Part of World War II
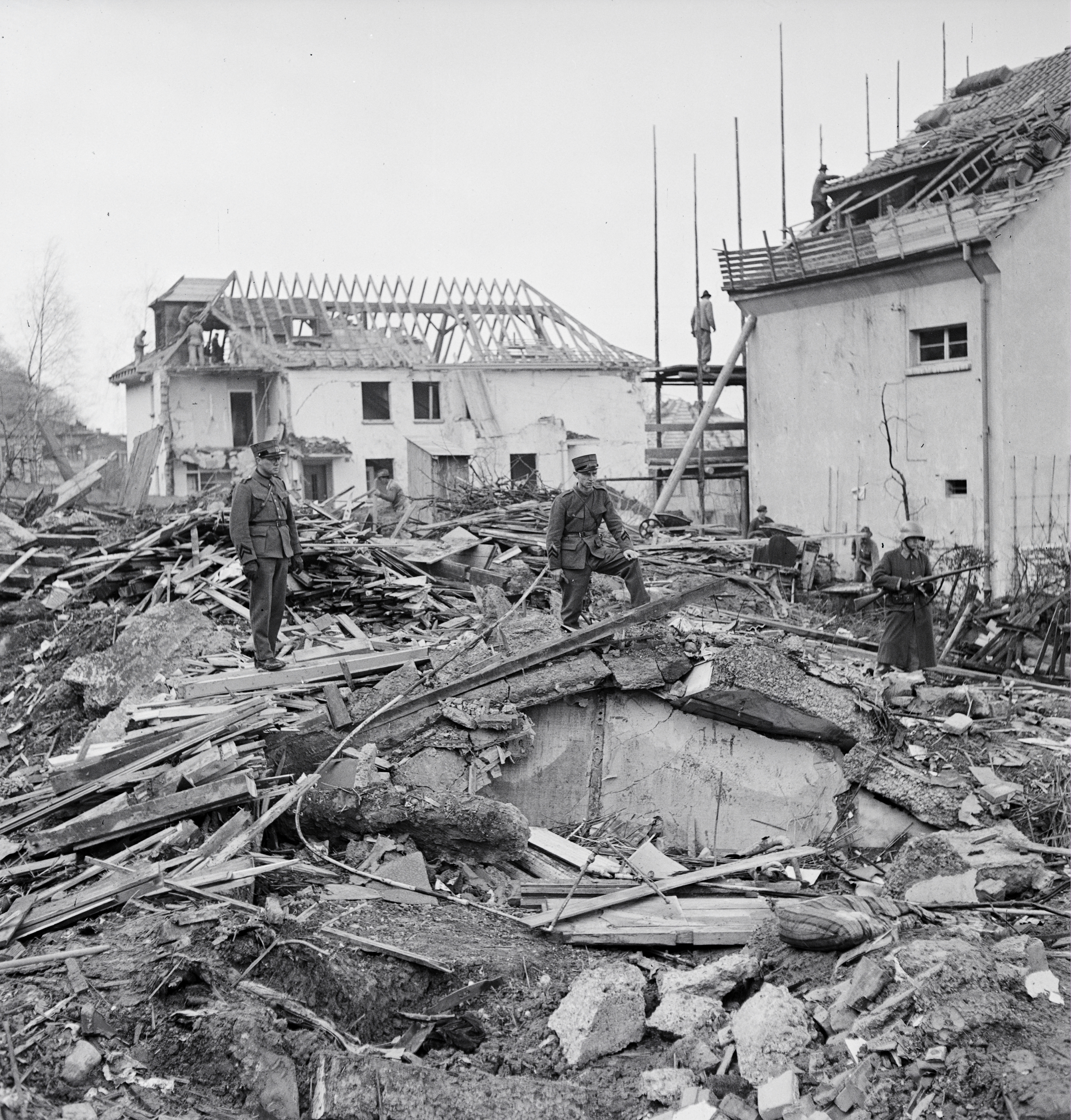
- Swiss Army officers standing over debris after an Allied bombing in Oberstrass, Zurich, on 4 March 1945
Date	1940 to 1945
Location	Switzerland
Result	Downing of several US and UK aircraft by Swiss fighters; Bombings on several towns; U.S. Government paid Swiss $4 million and an additional $14.4 million (in 1944/45 dollars)

Belligerents
United States; United Kingdom	Switzerland	Germany

Casualties and losses
10 aircraft 36 airmen killed	3 aircraft lost fighting Germany; 1 lost fighting the Allies; 84 civilians killed	11 aircraft

Letter from OSS director William J. Donovan regarding bombings of Swiss towns.

During World War II, the neutral country of Switzerland underwent initially sporadic bombing and aerial combat events that became more frequent during the later stages of the war.

Switzerland was adjacent to and at times almost completely surrounded by Axis, or Axis-occupied, countries. On several occasions, Allied bombing raids hit targets in Switzerland resulting in fatalities and property damage. The Swiss government initially intercepted German aircraft in 1940 during the Battle of France but caved to German pressure and stopped intercepting their aircraft. Such events led to diplomatic exchanges. While Allied forces explained the causes of violations as navigation errors, equipment failure, weather conditions, and pilots' errors, fear was expressed in Switzerland that some neutrality violations were intended to exert pressure on the country to end its economic cooperation with Nazi Germany. In addition to bombing raids, air attacks by individual fighter planes strafed Swiss targets toward the end of the war. The Swiss military, in turn, attacked Allied aircraft overflying Switzerland with fighters and anti-aircraft cannons.

== Background ==
During World War II, Swiss airspace was violated by both sides. During the Battle of France, the Swiss Air Force shot down eleven German planes violating Swiss airspace for the loss of three planes in return. The most significant of these incidents occurred after the Swiss shot down a Messerschmitt Bf 110 on 4 June 1940. In response to this, Hermann Göring ordered an incursion by 32 Bf 110s. These were intercepted by 14 Swiss Messerschmitt 109s, leading to the loss of four 110s. This resulted in a German threat of sanctions and retaliation, and on 20 June the Swiss government decided to order an end to interceptions of foreign aircraft in Swiss airspace.

With Allied and Axis aircraft freely overflying Switzerland, over 7,000 siren alarms were initiated in Switzerland during the war. Some Allied bombers took advantage of this situation by using Swiss airspace as a safer route than enemy air space on their bombing runs to and from targets in Germany, but more often, bombers in distress preferred to descend to neutral Switzerland for asylum rather than in German territory. As a result, Switzerland ultimately interned 1,700 American airmen.

From 1941 to 1942, Allied bombers very rarely flew over Switzerland, because the Swiss authorities, under German pressure, prescribed black-outs in order to complicate navigation for U.S. and British air crews. As neutral Swiss territory was safe for Allied bombers, Germany also pressured the Swiss into forcing the Allied air crews to land in Switzerland, instead of letting them continue bombing runs.

== Axis violations of Swiss airspace ==
Nazi Germany repeatedly violated Swiss airspace. During the Battle of France, German aircraft violated Swiss airspace at least 197 times. In several air incidents, the Swiss shot down 11 Luftwaffe aircraft between 10 May 1940 and 17 June 1940, while suffering the loss of three of their own aircraft. The most significant of these incidents occurred after the Swiss shot down a Messerschmitt Bf 110 on 4 June 1940. In response to this, Hermann Göring ordered an incursion by 32 Bf 110s. These were intercepted by 14 Swiss Messerschmitt 109s, leading to the loss of four 110s. This resulted in a German threat of sanctions and retaliation, and on 20 June the Swiss government decided to order an end to interceptions of foreign aircraft in Swiss airspace on the 20th of June 1940, instead Swiss fighters began to force intruding aircraft to land at Swiss airfields. Anti-aircraft units still operated. Adolf Hitler was especially furious when he saw that German equipment was used to shoot down German pilots. He said they would respond "in another manner". Later, Hitler and Hermann Göring sent saboteurs to destroy Swiss airfields but they were captured by Swiss troops before they could cause any damage.

== Allied violations of Swiss airspace ==
In 1943, the Swiss military began attacking Allied aircraft breaching Swiss airspace. Six Allied aircraft were shot down by Swiss Air Force fighters and four by anti-aircraft cannon, killing 36 Allied airmen. The first Allied aircraft to be shot down were two Royal Air Force bombers flying low over Swiss territory on the night of 12–13 July 1943, which were shot down by Swiss anti-aircraft fire over Valais. The first American bomber shot down over Switzerland was downed near Bad Ragaz on 1 October 1943, and only three of its crew survived.

On 5 September 1944, American P-51 Mustangs escorting a damaged B-17 bomber crossed into Swiss airspace and were confronted by Swiss Messerschmitt Bf 109s. Not realizing they were over Switzerland, the P-51s attacked the Swiss Messerschmitts, shooting down one and killing its pilot, and damaging another one.

== Bombing incidents ==
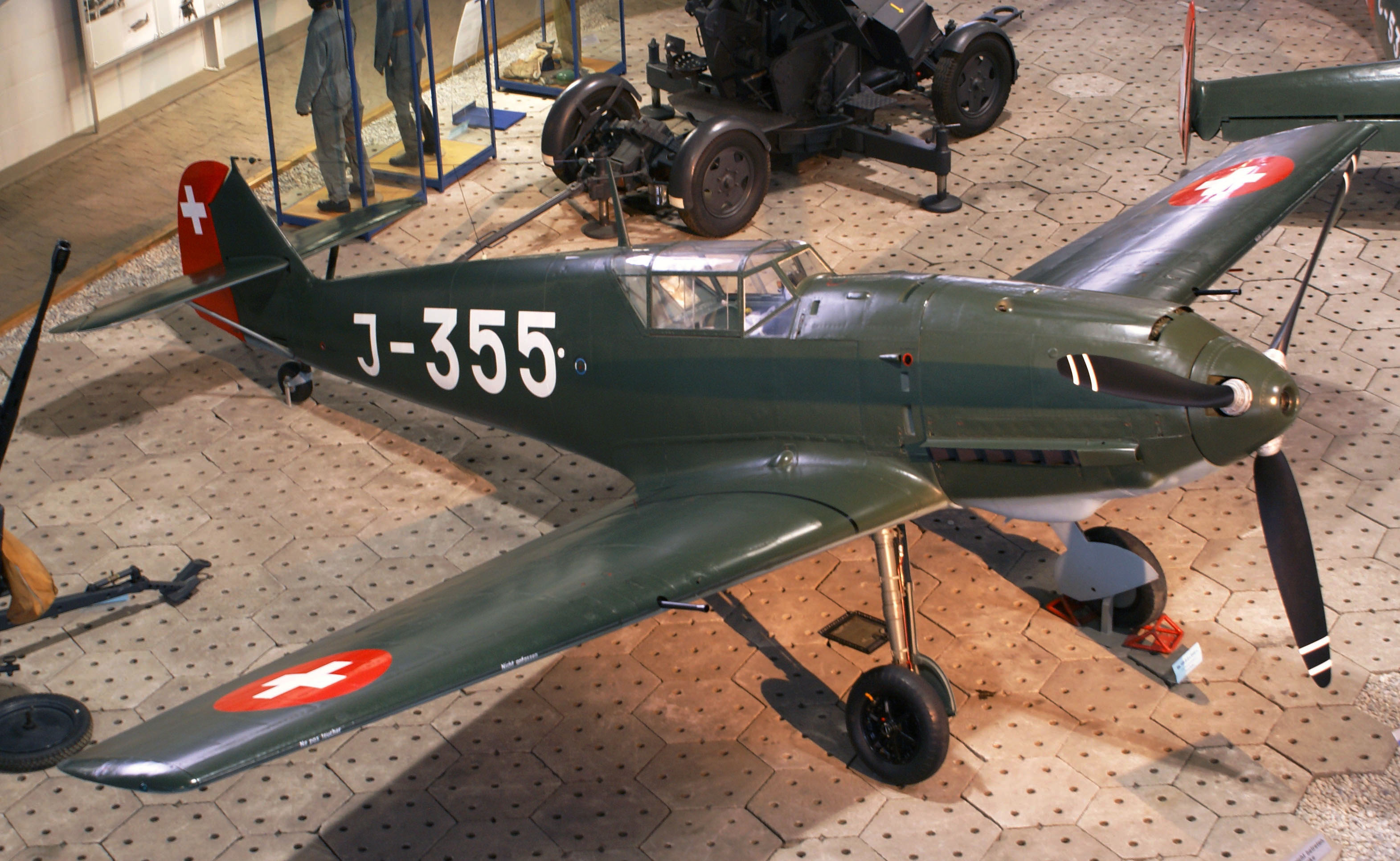
A Swiss Messerschmitt Bf 109, which served as the backbone of the Swiss Air Force during World War II. Swiss Bf 109s were regularly used by the Swiss Air Force to intercept Allied bombers flying over Switzerland

Allied planes accidentally bombed Switzerland about seventy times during World War II due to navigational errors or weather, killing 84 people.

=== Schaffhausen ===
The daylight bombing of Schaffhausen on 1 April 1944 by the United States Army Air Forces (USAAF) was the most serious of all incidents. Approximately 50 B-24 Liberators of a larger force misidentified Schaffhausen as their target Ludwigshafen am Rhein near Mannheim (about 235 km (146 mi) north of Schaffhausen), and dropped sixty tons of bombs on the town. Although an air raid alarm sounded in Schaffhausen, air raid sirens had been set off so many times without any attack that complacency had set in and the locals felt safe, and many failed to take cover. A total of 40 people were killed and about 270 injured, and large parts of the town were destroyed, including part of the railway station building (18 casualties), the former natural history museum and a theater. At the insistence of the Swiss government for an explanation, Allied investigations into the incident found that bad weather broke up the American formation over France, and that high winds that nearly doubled the ground speed of the bombers confused the navigators (two other widely scattered cities in Germany and France were also mistakenly bombed during the same mission). As Schaffhausen is situated on the right bank (north side) of the Rhine river, it was apparently assumed to be Ludwigshafen am Rhein. By October 1944, US$4,000,000 had been paid in restitution.

=== Stein am Rhein ===
On 22 February 1945, thirteen USAAF air attacks on Switzerland took place with Stein am Rhein receiving the most damage. Other places included Taegerwilen, Rafz, and Vals. Overall, 21 people were killed in these attacks.

=== Zürich and Basel ===
On 4 March 1945, six USAAF B-24H bombers hit Zürich with 12.5 tons of high explosives and 12 tons of incendiaries, killing five people. The intended target had been Aschaffenburg near Frankfurt am Main (290 km (180 mi) north). The six bombers had gone off course, and their crews believed they were bombing Freiburg im Breisgau. At virtually the same time, other bombers dropped 12.5 tons of high explosives and five tons of incendiaries on Basel.

=== Other attacks ===
During 1940, minor attacks on Geneva, Renens, Basel, and Zurich were conducted by the Royal Air Force.

On 1 October 1943, bombs were released by the USAAF over Samedan leading to property damage. 1944 saw attacks that included Koblenz, Cornol, Niederweningen, and Thayngen. Attacks in 1945 included Chiasso twice. Basel was bombed on 4 March 1945. The last air attack occurred in Brusio on 16 April 1945.

On 28 to 29 April 1944 a German Messerschmitt Bf 110 G-4 pursued a British bomber into Swiss airspace. Due to engine issues, the German pilot was forced to land in Switzerland where he was then detained. The Bf 110 was equipped with an advanced FuG 220 radar. Germany sold the Swiss 12 new Bf 109 G-6s in return for Swiss engineers destroying the device to prevent it possibly falling into Allied hands. However, the G-6s were found to have serious manufacturing defects, the result of wartime manufacturing conditions.

== Court-martial proceedings ==
Regarding the Zurich bombing, a court-martial proceeding took place in England on 1 June 1945. Col. James M. Stewart, the famous actor and wartime B-24 pilot, was the presiding officer of the trial. Accused were the lead pilot Lieutenant William R. Sincock and one of his navigators, Lieutenant Theodore Q. Balides, for violating the 96th Article of War, and Sincock specifically for having "wrongfully and negligently caused bombs to be dropped in friendly territory". Weather conditions and equipment failure were found to be at fault; the defendants were found not guilty of criminal culpability. Prosecutors for the International Military Tribunal for the Far East once discussed this case as further precedent to prosecute Japanese pilots involved in the surprise attack on Pearl Harbor. However, they quickly dropped the idea after realizing there was no international law that protected neutral areas and nationals specifically from attack by aircraft. (Note: Article 39 of CHAPTER VI of the 1923 Hague Rules of Air Warfare stated: Belligerent aircraft are bound to respect the rights of neutral Powers and to abstain within the jurisdiction of a neutral State from the commission of any act which it is the duty of that State to prevent. However, the Hague Rules of Air Warfare was never formally adopted by every major power, and therefore never legally binding as international law.)

== Reparations ==
In addition to the US$4 million paid by October 1944, the United States government agreed to pay 62,176,433.06 Swiss francs (then equivalent to $14.4 million, or $263 million at current prices) to the Swiss government as full and final payment for damage to persons and property during World War II on 21 October 1949.

== See also ==
- Switzerland during the World Wars
- Wauwilermoos internment camp
- Bombing of Dublin in World War II
- Operation Tannenbaum

== Literature (selected works) ==
- Cathryn J. Prince: Shot from the Sky: American POWs in Switzerland. Kindle Edition. Naval Institute Press/Amazon Media EU S.à r.l., 2015, ASIN B00ZSDPIHE.
- Stephen Tanner: Refuge from the Reich: American Airmen and Switzerland During World War II. Da Capo Press, illustrated edition, 2001, ISBN 978-1885119704.
- Daniel L. Culler: Black Hole of Wauwilermoos: An Airman's Story. Sky & Sage Books, Green Valley 1995. ISBN 978-1887776011.
- Jürg Hofer: Die Strafanstalt Wauwilermoos LU. Sauerländer 1978, ISBN 978-3794118441.
