= Egolzwil =

- Municipality
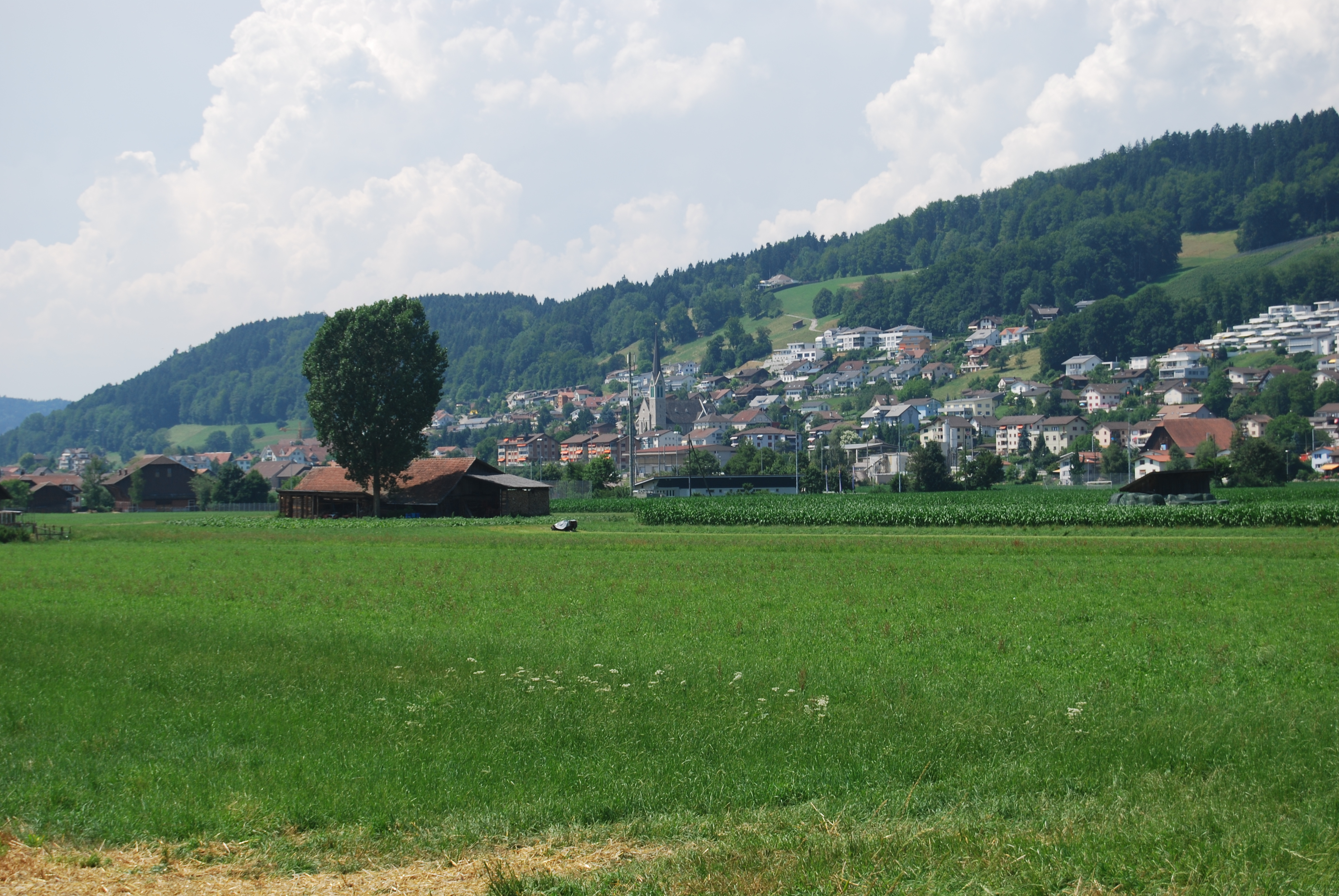

- Flag Coat of arms
- Location of Egolzwil
- Location within Switzerland Location within Canton of Lucerne
- Coordinates: 47°11′N 8°0′E
- Country: Switzerland
- Canton: Lucerne
- District: Willisau

Area
  - Total: 4.17 km^{2} (1.61 sq mi)
- Elevation: 523 m (1,716 ft)

Population (December 2020)
  - Total: 1,530
  - Density: 367/km^{2} (950/sq mi)
- Time zone: UTC+01:00 (CET)
  - Summer (DST): UTC+02:00 (CEST)
- Postal code: 6243
- SFOS number: 1127
- ISO 3166 code: CH-LU
- Surrounded by: Dagmersellen, Nebikon, Schötz, Wauwil
- Website: www.egolzwil.ch

Egolzwil is a municipality in the district of Willisau in the canton of Lucerne in Switzerland.

== History ==
Egolzwil is first mentioned around 1160 as Eigoltiswile. During World War II, Allied soldiers who were caught after their escape from the Swiss internment camps were detained in the prison camp Wauwilermoos.

== Geography ==
Aerial view (1950)

Egolzwil has an area, as of 2006, of 4.2 km^{2} (1.6 sq mi). Of this area, 61.9% is used for agricultural purposes, while 24% is forested. Of the rest of the land, 12.9% is settled (buildings or roads) and the remainder (1.2%) is non-productive (rivers, glaciers or mountains). In the 1997 land survey, 23.74% of the total land area was forested. Of the agricultural land, 58.51% is used for farming or pastures, while 3.6% is used for orchards or vine crops. Of the settled areas, 6.95% is covered with buildings, 1.2% is industrial, 0.24% is classed as special developments, 0.24% is parks or greenbelts and 4.32% is transportation infrastructure. Of the unproductive areas, 0.72% is unproductive standing water (ponds or lakes), and 0.48% is unproductive flowing water (rivers).

The municipality is located on the northern edge of the Wauwilermoos. It consists of the linear village of Egolzwil.

== Demographics ==
Egolzwil has a population (as of 31 December 2020) of 1,530. As of 2007, 105 or about 8.2% are not Swiss citizens. Over the last 10 years the population has grown at a rate of 5.8%. Most of the population (as of 2000) speaks German (93.0%), with Serbo-Croatian being second most common ( 2.3%) and Albanian being third ( 1.2%).

In the 2007 election the most popular party was the CVP which received 45.8% of the vote. The next three most popular parties were the FDP (26.8%), the SVP (17.6%) and the Green Party (5.4%).

The age distribution, as of 2008, in Egolzwil is; 331 people or 25.9% of the population is 0–19 years old. 347 people or 27.1% are 20–39 years old, and 474 people or 37.1% are 40–64 years old. The senior population distribution is 92 people or 7.2% are 65–79 years old, 31 or 2.4% are 80–89 years old and 4 people or 0.3% of the population are 90+ years old.

The entire Swiss population is generally well educated. In Egolzwil about 72.9% of the population (between age 25-64) have completed either non-mandatory upper secondary education or additional higher education (either university or a Fachhochschule).

As of 2000 there are 442 households, of which 119 households (or about 26.9%) contain only a single individual. 78 or about 17.6% are large households, with at least five members. As of 2000 there were 253 inhabited buildings in the municipality, of which 203 were built only as housing, and 50 were mixed use buildings. There were 145 single family homes, 35 double family homes, and 23 multi-family homes in the municipality. Most homes were either two (109) or three (70) story structures. There were only 13 single story buildings and 11 four or more story buildings.

Egolzwil has an unemployment rate of 1.6%. As of 2005, there were 48 people employed in the primary economic sector and about 17 businesses involved in this sector. 113 people are employed in the secondary sector and there are 12 businesses in this sector. 301 people are employed in the tertiary sector, with 25 businesses in this sector. As of 2000 53.6% of the population of the municipality were employed in some capacity. At the same time, females made up 42% of the workforce.

In the 2000 census the religious membership of Egolzwil was; 988 (80.6%) were Roman Catholic, and 95 (7.7%) were Protestant, with an additional 34 (2.77%) that were of some other Christian faith. There are 28 individuals (2.28% of the population) who are Muslim. Of the rest; there were 6 (0.49%) individuals who belong to another religion (not listed), 27 (2.2%) who do not belong to any organized religion, 48 (3.92%) who did not answer the question.

The historical population is given in the following table:

year	population
about 1695	ca. 200
1798	340
1850	576
1900	438
1950	522
2000	1,226

== Heritage sites of national significance ==
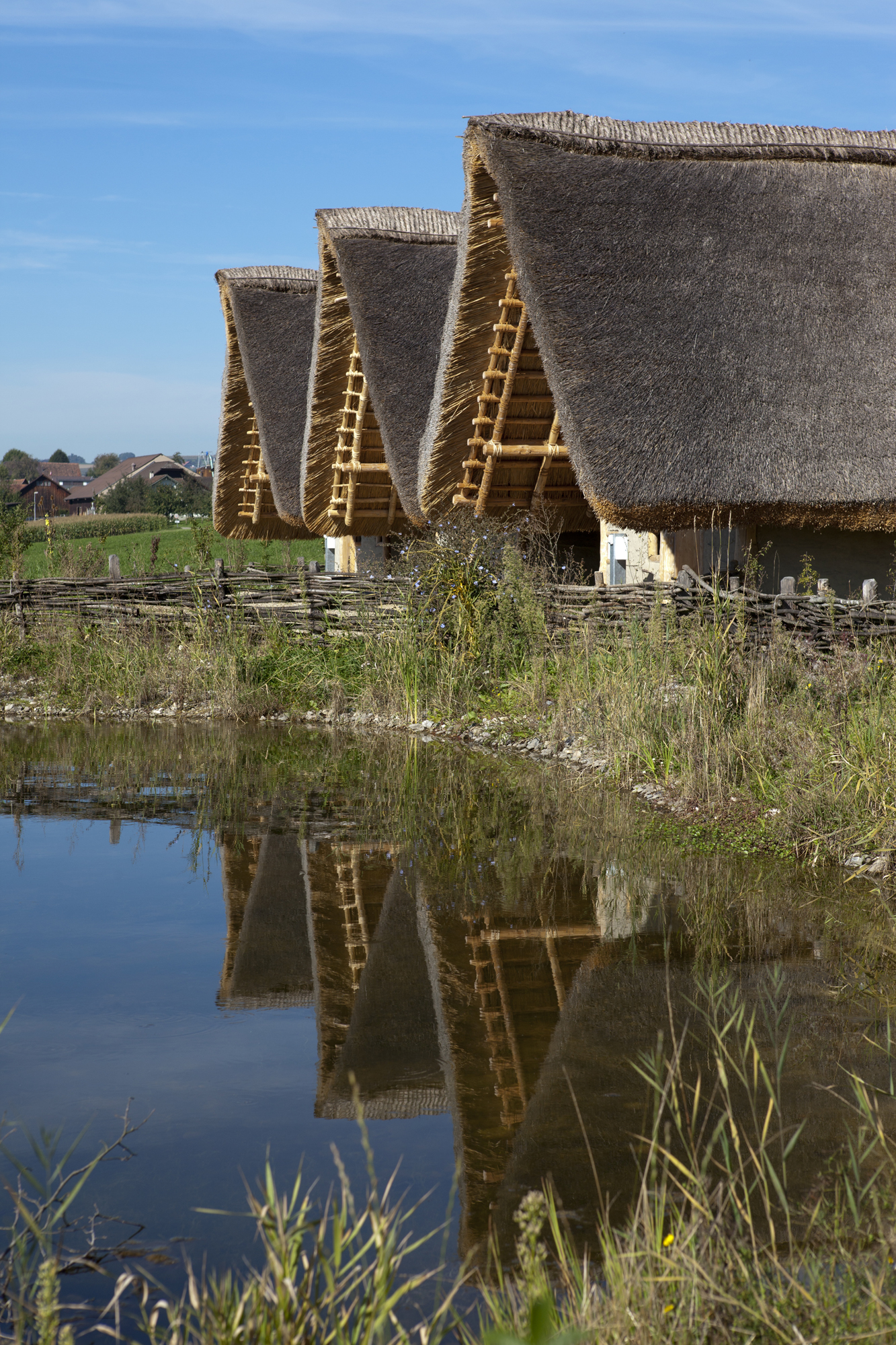
Reconstruction of three pile dwellings at Wauwilermoos

The prehistoric lakeside settlement at Wauwilermoos is listed as a Swiss heritage site of national significance. The Egolzwil 3 settlement is part of the Prehistoric Pile dwellings around the Alps a UNESCO World Heritage Site.

Egolzwil 3 is one of several sites in the Wauwilermoos (Wauwil bog) and is an example of the Egolzwil culture. The settlement is considered the oldest in Switzerland. The dendrochronological dating of the wooden piles is uncertain, but they are from around 4300 BC.

The site was first excavated by H. Reinerth in 1932 and by E. Vogt and R. Wyss between 1950 and 1988. The settlement was occupied for only about 6 years and had several rows of houses with bark covered floors. A number of ceramic, stone, flint and antler tools were found, along with round bottom pots, flagons and beakers.
