= Hans Vogt (conductor) =

Swiss composer and conductor

- Born: 3 March 1909; Basel, Switzerland
- Died: 28 July 1978 (aged 69); Basel, Switzerland
- Occupations: Composer, pianist, conductor

Hans Vogt (3 March 1909 – 28 July 1978) was a Swiss composer, pianist, and conductor. He worked at Radio Basel from 1942, eventually serving as head of its music department.

== Biography ==
Vogt was born in Basel to Emil Vogt, a schoolteacher and choir conductor, and Anna Rosa née Vogt. He was the brother of the archaeologist Emil Vogt. On the advice of his relative Hermann Suter, he studied at the Basel Conservatory from 1928, earning a piano virtuosity diploma in 1931 and a teaching diploma in singing and music in 1932. He also took conducting lessons with Felix Weingartner and composition lessons with Otto Rippl, and spent a year studying in Paris. In 1941, he married Johanna Frieda Frey, daughter of Johann Jakob Frey.

== Career ==
Vogt worked as a composer, pianist, and conductor at Radio Basel from 1942, becoming a full-time employee in 1953. He served as deputy head (1958) and then head (1966) of the music department. He was also a piano teacher at the Basel Conservatory from 1946 to 1953.

== Works ==
- Pianistische Grundbegriffe, 1949.

== Bibliography ==
- DMS, pp. 386–387.
- Hans Vogt, geboren 3. März 1909, 1972 (list of works).
- Fonds Hans Vogt, University Library of Basel (UBB).
