= Lutzengüetle =

Archaeological site in Liechtenstein

Lutzengüetle is an archaeological site in the municipality of Gamprin, Liechtenstein (erroneously identified as Eschen in some specialized literature). It occupies a plateau on an isolated hill in the Rhine valley, protected by steep rock walls and featuring a depression on the northeast side. The site gave its name to the Lutzengüetle culture, defined by Emil Vogt in 1964, and continues to yield rich archaeological material relating to this culture.

== Excavations ==
Excavations were carried out in 1916, 1937, and 1942–1945 under the direction of Adolf Hild, David Beck, and Emil Vogt. The site has only been partially uncovered and has not been the subject of a comprehensive scientific investigation.

== Findings ==
Traces on the plateau include a 3rd-century Roman refuge reinforced by dry-stone walls and a rampart, as well as a 13th-century building. More notably, the rocky depression contains a stratigraphic layer four meters thick with remains from the Neolithic, the Bronze Age, and the Iron Age. Postholes and hearths indicate that the site was occupied repeatedly, though no layer presents coherent structures. Chronology has been established primarily through ceramics.

Settlers of the Lutzengüetle culture (late 5th millennium BC) and of the Pfyn culture practiced agriculture and animal husbandry, with hunting becoming more important during the Horgen culture. Inhabitants of the Late Bronze Age and the La Tène period were also farmers; the archaeological material does not support the presence of specialized craftsmanship.

== Cultural connections ==
Lutzengüetle lies on the route connecting the Lake Constance region to the southern Alpine area. The site appears to have been settled from the north, but influences from the south (the Tamins-Carasso cultural group) are perceptible from the Horgen culture onward. Bronze Age and Iron Age objects show characteristics typical of cultures from the inner Alpine valleys and from Central Europe.

== Bibliography ==
- A. Hild, "Lutzengüetle", in JbFL, 37, 1937, 85–98.
- J. Bill, "Der Eschnerberg zur Jungsteinzeit", in HA, 9, 1978, 89–108.
- H. Brem, "Münzfunde vom Lutzengüetle", in JbFL, 93, 1995, 217–257.
- R. Gleser, Die Epi-Rössener Gruppen in Südwestdeutschland, 1995, 272–274.
