= Emil Vogt (archaeologist) =

Swiss archaeologist and museum director

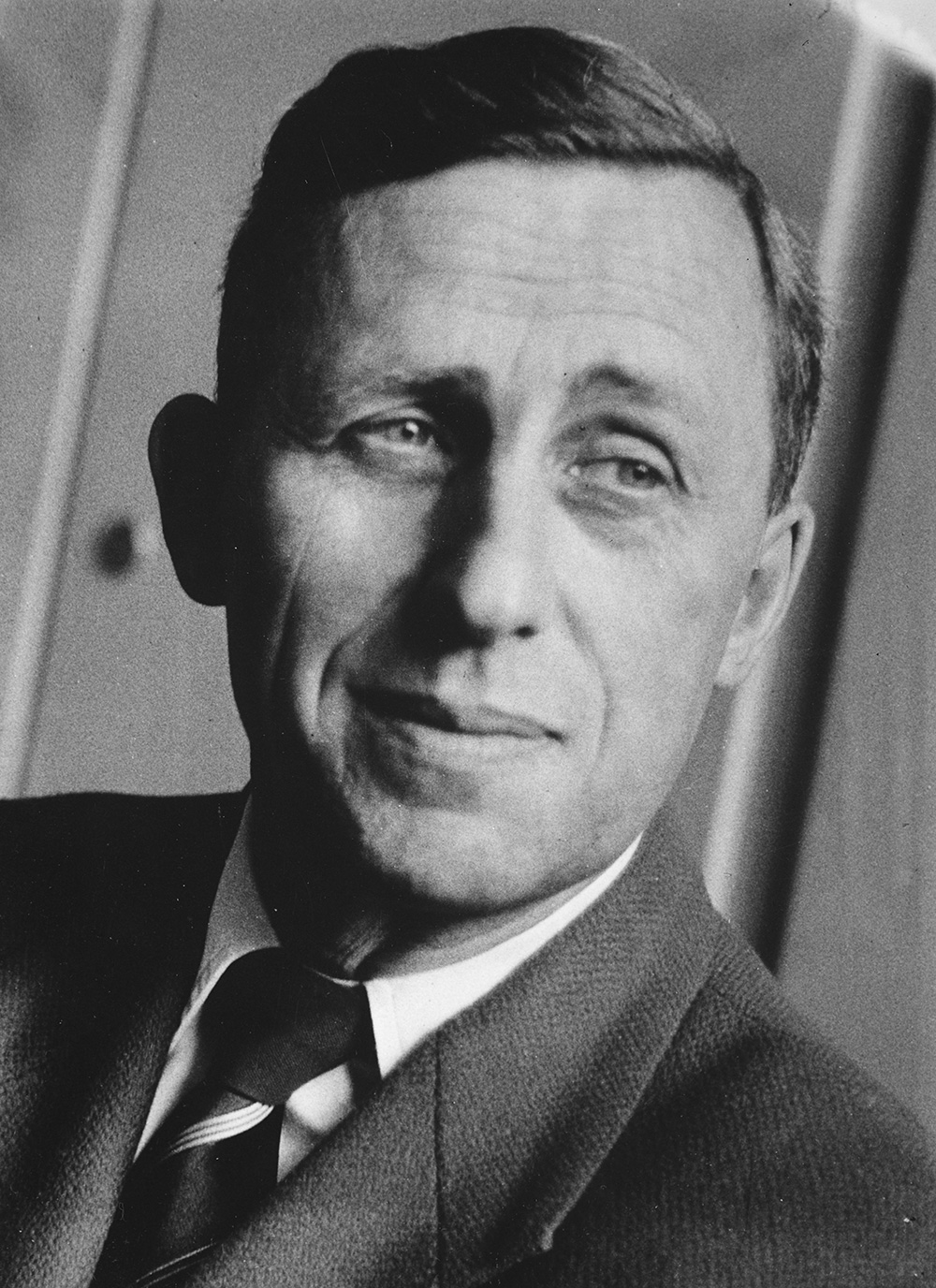
- Born: 12 April 1906; Basel, Switzerland
- Died: 2 December 1974 (aged 68); Rüschlikon, Switzerland
- Occupations: Archaeologist, professor, museum director
- Known for: Prehistoric archaeology, Swiss National Museum

Emil Vogt (12 April 1906 – 2 December 1974) was a Swiss archaeologist, professor of prehistoric and protohistoric studies, and director of the Swiss National Museum.

== Biography ==
Vogt was born in Basel to Emil Vogt, a schoolteacher and choir conductor, and Anna Rosa née Vogt. He was the brother of Hans Vogt. He studied in Breslau, Paris, Berlin, and Vienna, and received his doctorate from the University of Basel in 1928 with a thesis on the chronology of Late Bronze Age ceramics. In 1943, he married Maria Hermine Rother.

== Career ==
Vogt was appointed curator of the prehistoric and protohistoric section of the Swiss National Museum in 1930, becoming vice-director in 1953 and director from 1961 to 1971. In this role, he developed the museum's scientific services and modernised the permanent exhibition. He was a Privatdozent at the ETH Zurich from 1933, then Privatdozent (1940) and extraordinarius professor of prehistoric and protohistoric studies at the University of Zurich from 1945 to 1974.

His fieldwork and publications covered excavations at the Cresta site at Cazis, the castrum at the Lindenhof in Zurich, Lutzengüetle in Liechstenstein, and the lake dwelling sites of Egolzwil, Cortaillod, and Horgen. His studies contributed to defining the Egolzwil, Horgen culture, and Cortaillod culture archaeological cultures. In his work Pfahlbaustudien, Vogt refuted the romantic theory of lake dwellings.

== Works ==
- Vogt, Emil: Die spätbronzezeitliche Keramik der Schweiz und ihre Chronologie, 1930.
- Vogt, Emil: "Pfahlbaustudien", in: Guyan, Walter Ulrich (ed.): Das Pfahlbauproblem, 1954, pp. 119–272.

== Bibliography ==
- Schweizerisches Landesmuseum Zürich. Jahresbericht 1971, 1972, pp. 54–56.
- Schweizerisches Landesmuseum Zürich. Jahresbericht 1974, 1975, pp. 55–57 (obituary).
- Archiv der Universität Zürich, Zurich, Nachlass Emil Vogt (1906–1974).
