= Wauwilermoos internment camp =

Internment and prisoner-of-war penal camp in Switzerland

Coordinates: 47.175856°N 8.005106°E

Wauwilermoos was an internment camp and prisoner-of-war penal camp in Switzerland during World War II. It was situated in the municipalities of Wauwil and Egolzwil in the Canton of Lucerne (Luzern). Established in 1940, Wauwilermoos was a penal camp for internees, including Allied soldiers, among them members of the United States Army Air Forces, who were sentenced for attempting to escape from other Swiss camps for interned soldiers, or other criminal offences. Together with Hünenberg and Les Diablerets, Wauwilermoos was one of three Swiss penal camps for internees that were established in Switzerland during World War II. The intolerable conditions were later described by numerous former inmates and by various contemporary reports and studies.

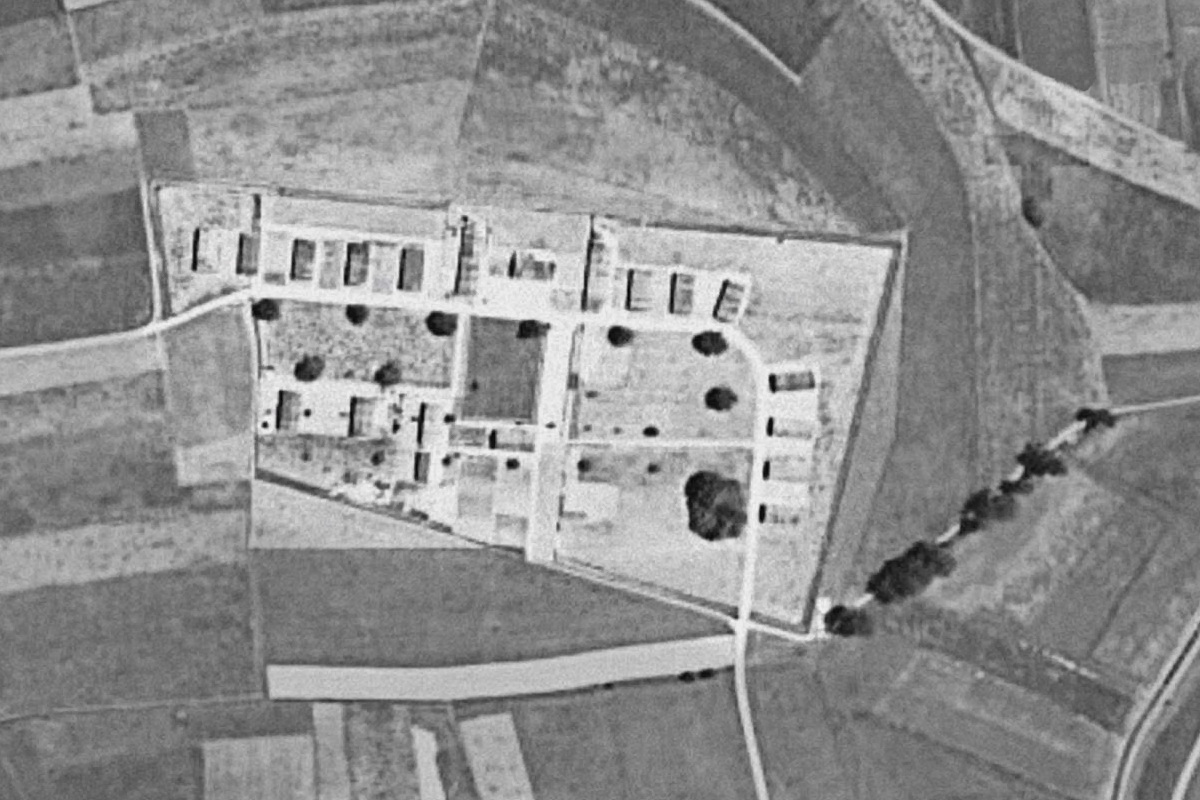
Aerial photograph of the Wauwilermoos camp area in mid-1944

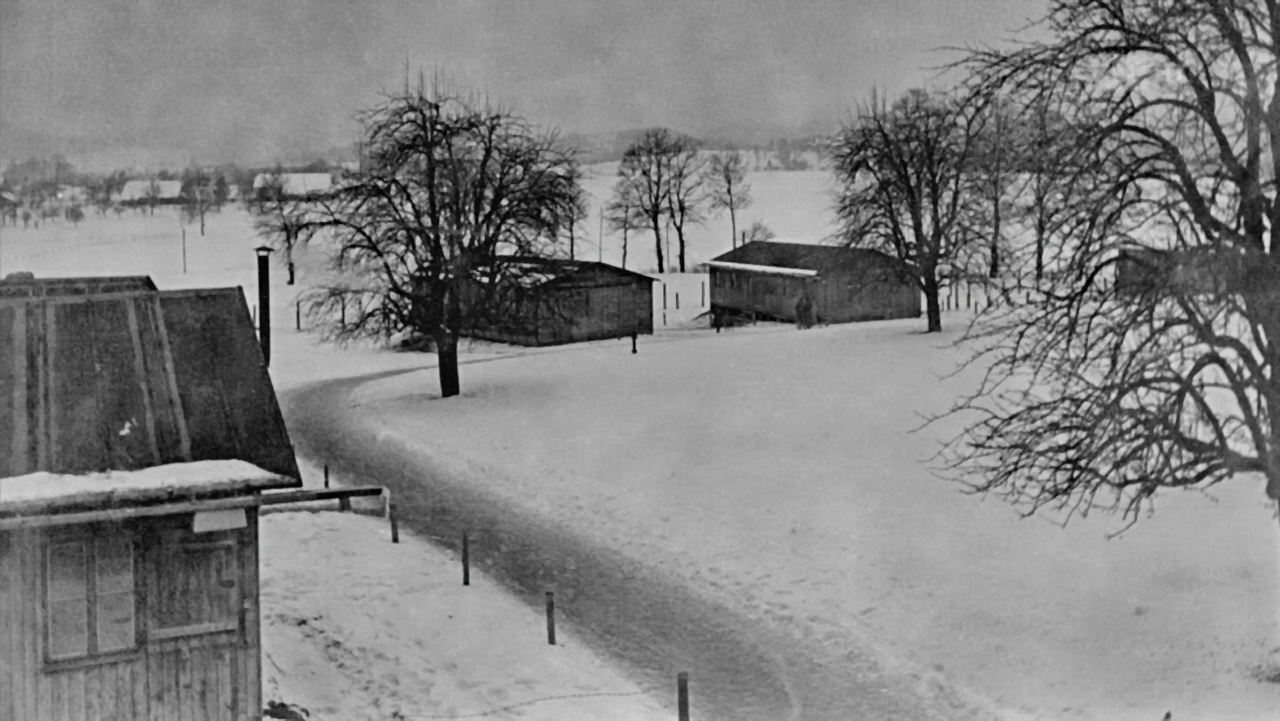
Wauwilermoos camp in late 1944

== History ==
Established in 1940, Wauwilermoos was a penal camp for internees, particularly for Allied soldiers during World War II. Unlike civilians, for instance Jewish refugees, who were usually sent back to the territories occupied by the Nazi regime, the Swiss government was required by the Geneva Convention of 1929 to keep these soldiers interned until the end of hostilities. The soldiers were held in barracks, and they were used as workers for agriculture and industry, except for officers who were not compelled to work and stayed in unoccupied mountain hotels, mainly in Davos.

Among the Swiss prisoners were members of the United States Army Air Forces, who were sentenced for attempting to escape from other Swiss camps for interned soldiers, or other offences. The internment prison camp was one of three Swiss penal camps for internees that were established in Switzerland during World War II. In Wauwilermoos prison camp both military internees and male civilian internees who had been convicted under the Swiss Military Criminal Code were detained.

Wauwilermoos housed military internees of various nations, including the United Kingdom, France, Germany, Greece, Italy, Poland, the Soviet Union, Yugoslavia, and the USA. Swiss military-run prisons like Wauwilermoos were established earlier in the war, after cantonal prisons became "overcrowded with prisoners convicted in military court." According to a decree of the Swiss Federal Council in 1941, military prisoners would be confined according to whether their offences qualified them for "custodia honesta," or honourable confinement.

Special military-run prisons would offer confinement for "certain offenses of purely military character" since honourable crimes such as "escape and escape attempts... [were] usually not the crimes of common criminals". Regardless of the intent of the Federal Council, for most of 1944 the Swiss authorities did not follow the custodia honesta model, but rather "grouped American internees with common criminals in Wauwilermoos". From July 1941 to September 1945 Wauwilermoos was under the command of Swiss Army captain Andre Béguin.

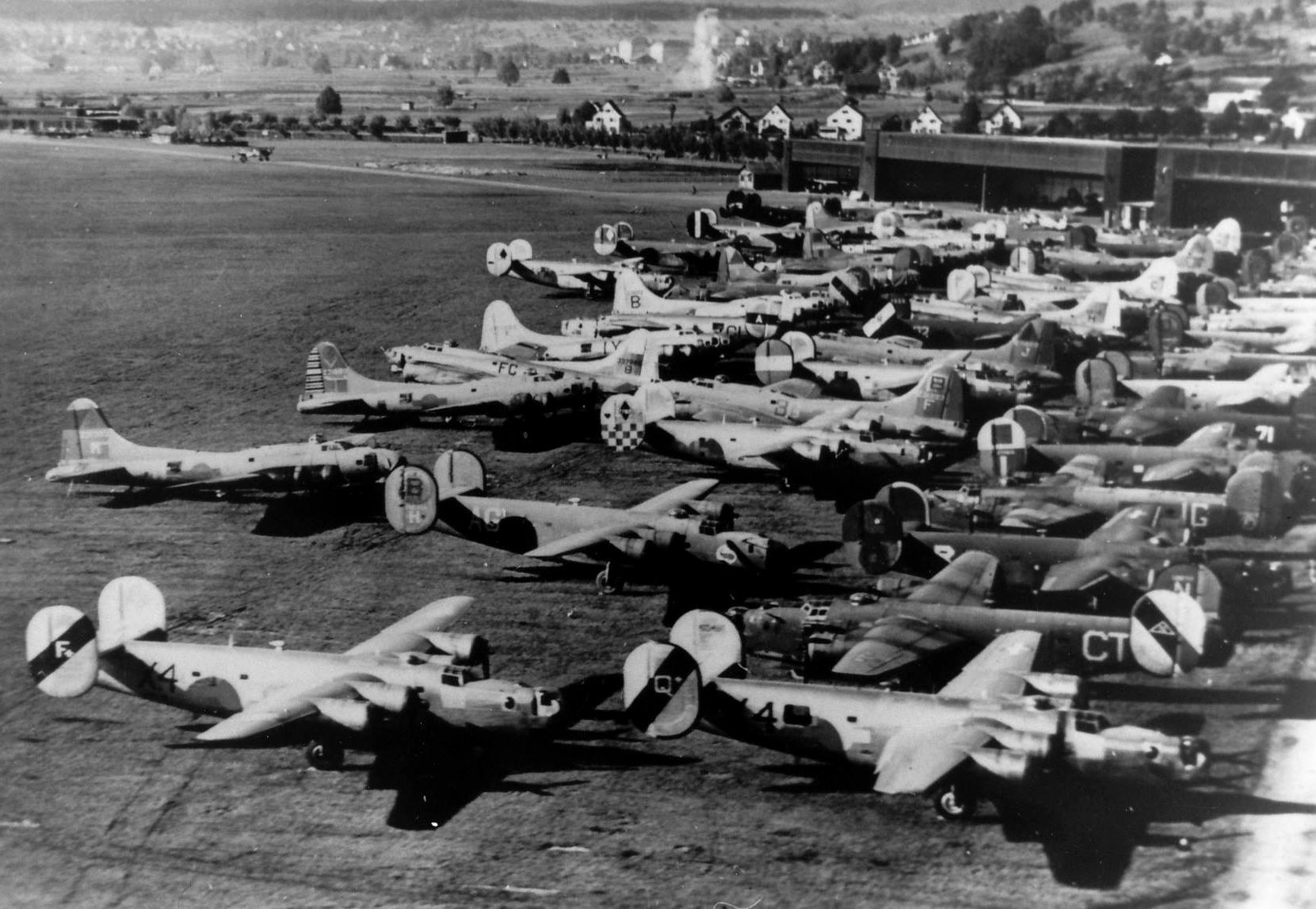
USAAF B-17 and B-24 bombers interned at Dübendorf airfield

The harsh detention conditions were later described by numerous former inmates and by various contemporary reports and studies. For instance, the American airman Sergeant Daniel L. Culler, B-24 top turret gunner, was one of the first USAAF airmen sent to Wauwilermoos, in June 1944. On 12 May of that year Culler, the B-24's tail gunner, Howard Melson, and the British soldier Matthew Thirlaway had slipped away from Adelboden, where they were interned. They hoped to escape via Zürich and Bellinzona to Italy, rejoining the Allies near Rome. After three days in the Ticino mountains Culler became ill, and he decided to go back to the Adelboden camp. Culler was condemned, still ill, and placed on rations of bread and water for ten days in Frutigen. When he returned to Adelboden he was sent to Wauwilermoos without any explanation; later he was informed that a judge had deemed his punishment as too light.

Culler's good clothes were confiscated by camp commandant André Béguin in return for "old dirty rags." Sent to barracks 9, Culler was repeatedly raped by internees from the Soviet Union. He reported this to Béguin and some of the guards who laughed and sent him back. The next days they even closed Culler's barrack at night. The torture did not end until new internees became Culler's roommates: "I was bleeding everywhere", Culler said later. Culler fell seriously ill and was transferred to hospital.

Béguin, who has been labelled "a disgrace to Switzerland", was appointed at his own request as the commander of the camp. The sanitary facilities were dysfunctional, and Béguin stole the food packages and harassed the Allied internees. "He was a Nazi, not only a Nazi sympathizer," Robert Cardenas told CBS 8 News in a 2013 interview. Cardenas, a retired US Air Force brigadier general, was a captain in the 44th Bomb Group interned in Switzerland in 1944. While Cardenas was not himself sent to Wauwilermoos, he did visit it and witnessed the camp's abysmal conditions firsthand. In his recollection:

the beds were wooden planks or some of them were only straw on the floor ... American prisoners were subjected to physical and sexual abuse, starvation, freezing, disease-ridden conditions and virtually no hygiene facilities ... [the camp] was exactly like, if not worse than, any POW camp in Germany, it was horrible.

Between 149 and 161 Americans who were caught attempting to escape in 1944 were sent to Wauwilermoos, "where their confinement would eventually test the limits of international law." The American internees remained in Wauwilermoos until November 1944, when the US State Department lodged protests against the Swiss government and secured their release. The agreement did not impact all nationalities, as Soviet internees were still at the Wauwilermoos camp in July 1945.

Starting in 1943 Switzerland attempted to shoot down American and British aircraft, mainly bombers, overflying Switzerland. Six aircraft were downed by Swiss Air Force fighters and nine by anti-aircraft cannons; 36 airmen were killed. In addition there were 137 emergency landings during the war. Officers were interned in Davos, enlisted men in Adelboden. The representative of the US military in Bern, military attaché Barnwell R. Legge, instructed the soldiers not to flee so as to allow the US Legation to co-ordinate their escape attempts, but the majority of the soldiers thought it was a diplomatic ruse or did not receive the instruction directly. Soldiers who were caught after their escape from the internment camps were often detained in the Wauwilermoos prison camp near Luzern.

On 1 October 1944 Switzerland housed 39,670 internees in all: 20,650 from Italy, 10,082 from Poland, 2,643 from the United States, 1,121 from the United Kingdom (including five Australians), 822 from the Soviet Union, and 245 from France. In September the Office of Strategic Services (OSS) was commissioned by the US Supreme Command to organise the escapes of 1,000 American internees, but this did not happen until late in the winter of 1944–45.

== Location ==
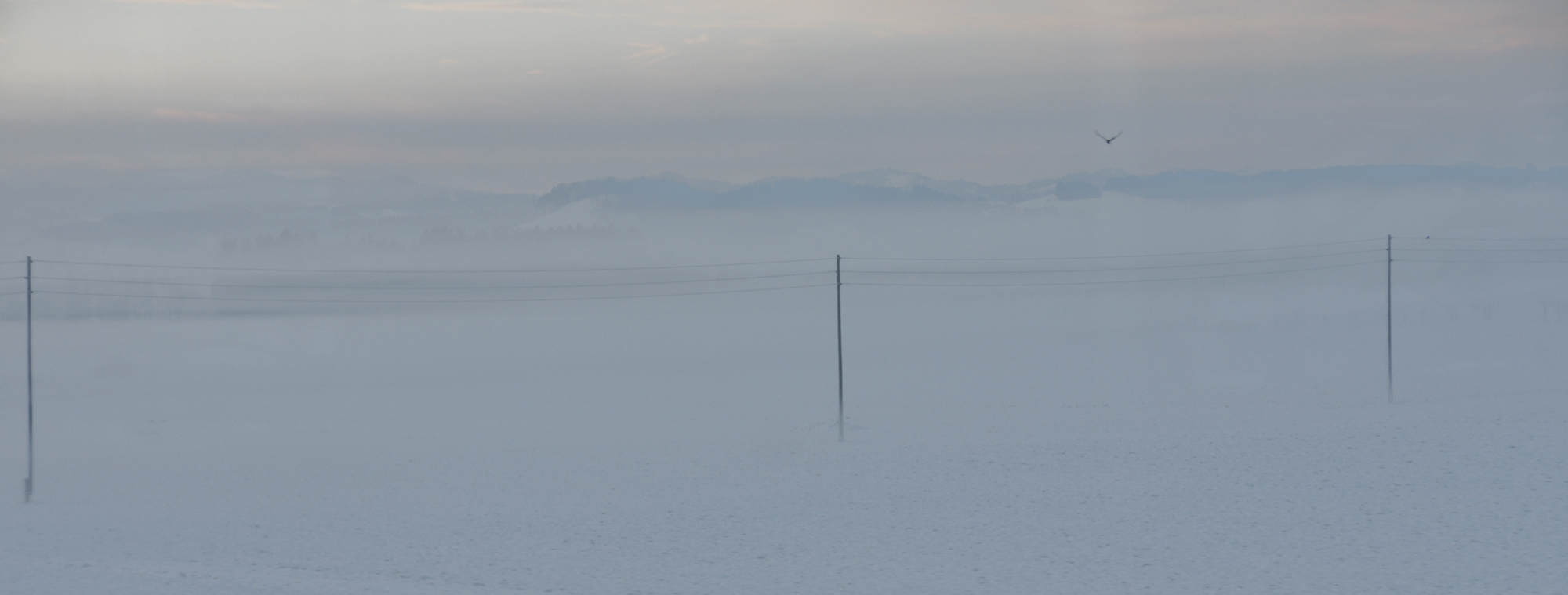
Wauwilermoos moorland

The site was located on the former Wauwilersee lake in the municipalities of Egolzwil, Wauwil and Schötz in the Canton of Luzern in Switzerland. Peat at the former Wauwilersee lake had been mined since 1820, and the area was drained in the mid-19th century. Due to the fact that the camp was built on a former lake, the internees often sank to their ankles in mud.

== Buildings and organisation ==
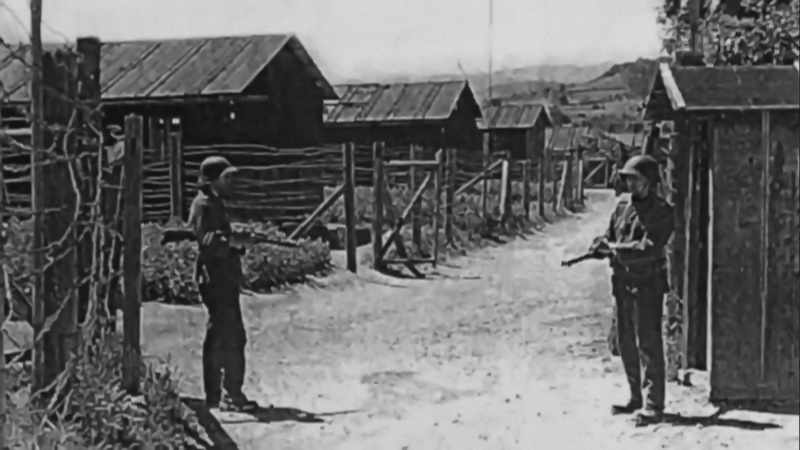
Entrance area guarded by two Swiss Army soldiers

The camp was under the supervision of the Swiss Army. From the beginning, Wauwilermoos had a bad reputation. The camp was guarded day and night by soldiers with dogs. In all 47 men formed the guard as of 13 February 1945. The camp was additionally secured by several rows of barbed wire.

Within the camp sector "Santenberg" was considered a military prison, sector "Egolzwil" housed alcoholics, while the department for "difficult elements" and for repeat offenders was in the sector "Wauwilermoos". In Wauwilermoos prison camp there were both military internees and male civilian internees who had been convicted under the Swiss Military Criminal Code.

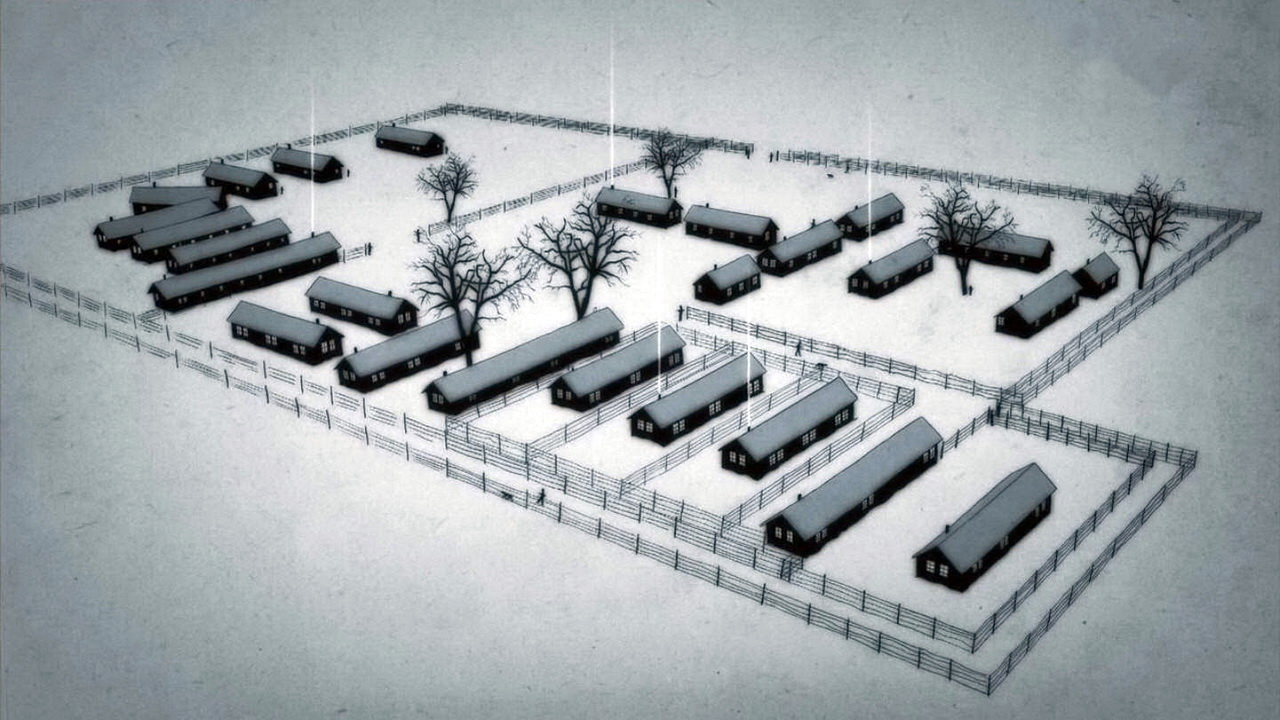
Bird's eye view animated map, from Notlandung documentary

On the 4 hectares (10 acres) site a total of 25 barracks were situated: eleven barracks with a capacity of about 550 inmates; the remaining 14 barracks were used by the Swiss camp staff. The prisoner barracks could each accommodate up to 50 people and were built from wood; they were neither insulated nor were they heated in winter. The barracks were equipped with simple beds stuffed with straw, and only officers slept on straw-filled mattresses. Sanitary facilities were basic; the latrines were simple trenches in the earth. The diet was meagre and poor. The detainees were widely lacking medical care. Even access to auxiliary packets from the Red Cross and communication by letter were denied.

The officer barracks were designed for only 20 occupants, but had 86 by autumn 1944. As a result, André Béguin explained that "he could no longer provide amenities such as sheets and shaving mirrors for officers below the rank of captain". Firewood to heat the stoves was also in short supply. In response to the Americans "who [threatened to cut] up tables and benches to keep warm", Béguin claimed surprise, and resolved that "if they behaved churlishly we could no longer treat them like officers". The commandant claimed that the allocation of firewood was greater than the quantity rationed to Swiss soldiers, a comparison used to justify many conditions around the camp.

Béguin also claimed that "the barracks were built according to regulations, and despite their shortcomings, were 'of the same type as those used in the Army'". Officials at the US Legation in Switzerland disagreed with Béguin's "tempered description of conditions" at the penal camp. According to military attaché General Legge, the camp was:

of the stockade type... surrounded by barbed wire, constantly patrolled by dogs and guards with sub-machine guns... [Conditions are] unreasonably severe, at the lowest subsistence level, and mud ankle deep.

General Legge considered them worse than those in POW camps in Nazi Germany.

Prior to the escape attempts of summer 1944, only a few American internees were condemned to Wauwilermoos, usually for "drunkenness and disorderly conduct" and with the tacit approval of the US legation. Once the escapes of American POWs increased, the "Swiss government sent every offender to Wauwilermoos, normally for two or three months without trial". By autumn 1944, over 100 American internees were incarcerated in Wauwilermoos, and "the Swiss government threatened to keep them there without trial for six to seven months". Many of the American internees were eventually charged in the Swiss military justice system, "an experience that forever changed their perceptions of Swiss neutrality".

== Legal premises ==
The majority of Americans held in Wauwilermoos in autumn 1944 were in "pre-trial confinement, awaiting a military tribunal by the Swiss Army for the crime of attempting escape". The Swiss military tribunals were convened by territorial courts (German: Divisionsgericht), operating under the Swiss Military Court Regulations of 1889 (Militärstrafgerichtsordnung) and the Swiss Military Penal Code of 1927 (Militärstrafgesetz Bundesgesetz vom 13. Juni 1927).

The jurisdiction was established by decree of the Swiss Federal Council in 1939. Presided over by a judge or chief justice, the tribunal panels consisted of six officers and non-commissioned officers under a judge. The Federal Council selected the judges and panel members for three-year terms. They retained their regular military positions while serving the court. The military court regulations specified that the chairmen must "hold at least a major degree", but the judges were not required to be trained in law, despite their position as "chairman of the court". Also a prosecutor, defence attorney, court clerk, and in the case of foreign defendants, a translator, were present at the tribunals.

The authority to try military internees under the Military Penal Code (MPC) meant that "the intent to apply internal Swiss law to internees predated World War II". Internees on trial for escaping normally faced charges of "disregard of regulations", an MPC article that allowed punishment of up to six months of imprisonment in times of war. However, the MPC did not specify a minimum sentence and even permitted disciplinary punishment in "mild cases". "This subjectivity gave military tribunals wide latitude to treat escape attempts as minor infractions, or instead to classify them as criminal felonies".

Once a tribunal convened, the burden of proof was normally substantiated by escape reports from the internment camp commanders, arrest reports from police, and interrogations carried out by an official investigator. This preliminary investigation was a laborious process and did not facilitate the swift execution of justice. The Swiss military justice system was overwhelmed by the rash of escape attempts in the summer of 1944. For the minority of indicted internees who eventually received verdicts the average sentence was 74 days in prison, but the average time to complete the investigations and military tribunals was 82 days.

For instance, Sgt. Dale Ellington, a gunner on a B-17 bomber based in England, was shot at by German anti-aircraft fire in April 1944. The aeroplane was shot at again by Swiss fighters and anti-aircraft batteries after crossing the Swiss border and then landed at Dübendorf airfield. Initially interned in Adelboden, Ellington remained there until September when the American forces were approaching the France–Switzerland border. On 17 September 1944 Ellington slipped out by using his passable German to purchase train tickets for himself and three other internees. Dressed in civilian clothes, the group travelled unaccosted to a city near the French border where they were arrested by an observant Swiss soldier. They were first confined in the Basel city jail for three days and then transferred to Wauwilermoos where Ellington recalled "barbed wire, straw bunks, and guard dogs". After nearly a month in Wauwilermoos, Ellington and his companions were transported to Bern to appear at the Swiss military tribunal. Each defendant was given a copy of the poorly translated charges, and had "methodically listed the identities of the defendants, the charges against them, a catalog of evidence, and the names of their tribunal jurors", in fact the only trial record they received.

The tribunal panel consisted of three Swiss officers, of which the highest ranking were two captains, and three enlisted soldiers. During the interrogation, a Swiss captain asked why they had travelled so far from their camp at Adelboden, and in response, "one of the airmen defiantly informed the juror that 'we were chasing butterflies'". According to Ellington, the response to this lack of candour was: "You have served thirty days at the detention camp and you will now return there and serve forty five more!" Ellington was returned to Wauwilermoos until 1 December. The verdict of the tribunal was not delivered for another 20 days, by a slightly altered panel on which one of the Swiss captains had been replaced by another officer of the same rank. The verdict was 75 days confinement for each of the four defendants, with 45 days deducted for pre-trial confinement. In addition, they were each fined their pro-rated share of the trial cost of 17.5 Swiss francs. Ellington was unaware that the tribunal continued after his departure, and was never informed of the actual verdict. This "demonstrates that internees had difficulty comprehending their experience with Swiss military justice due to both language and cultural differences, and the fact that they were effectively serving their sentences in advance of the tribunal verdicts".

== Conditions, human rights violations, and inspections ==
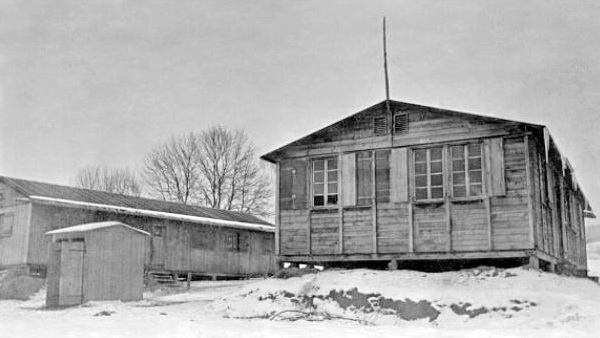
Wauwilermoos barracks in late 1944

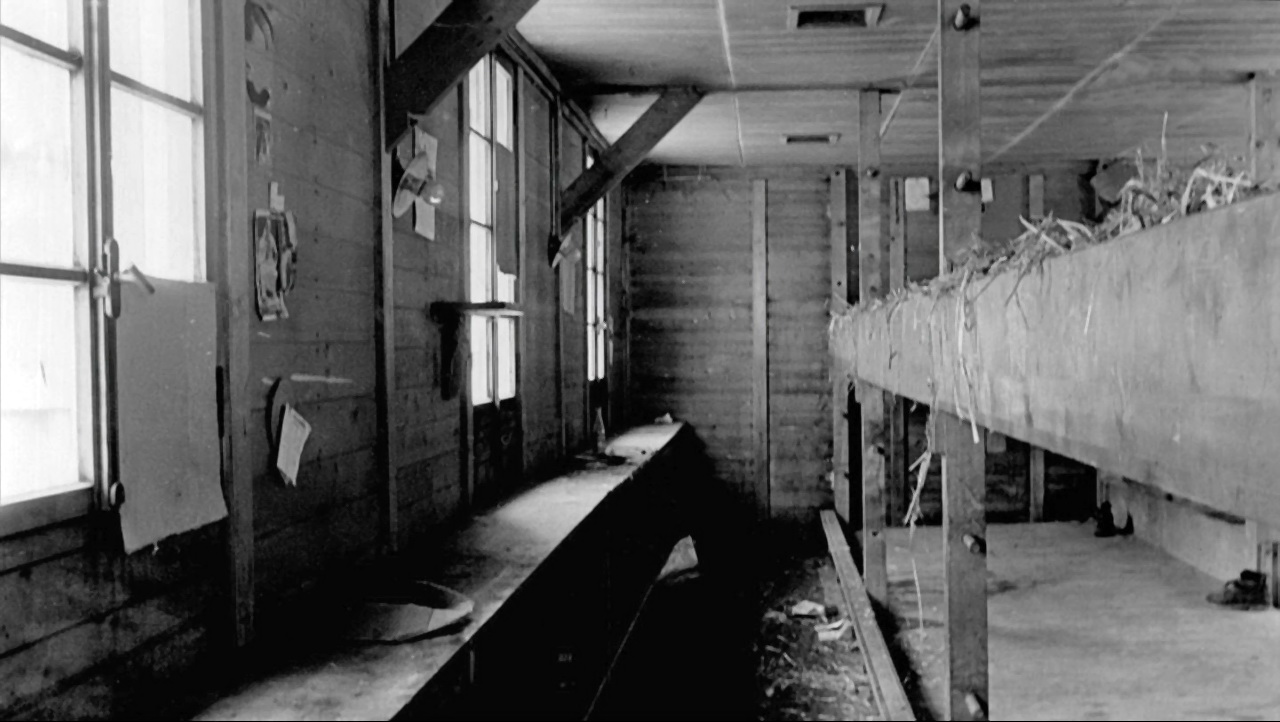
Interior of the barracks: beds of straw to the right and latrines to the left

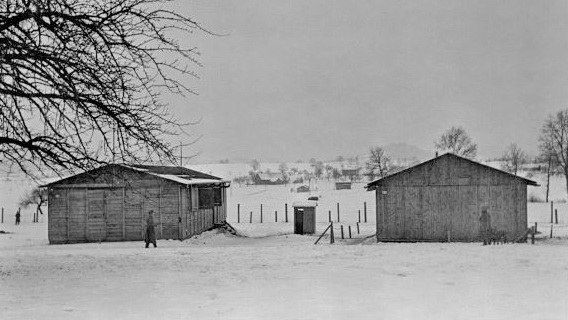
Wauwilermoos camp in winter 1944–45

Under the title "Das ist ein Skandal, Mit Hunden gehetzt" ("This is a scandal, rushed with dogs") the Swiss newspaper Berner Tagwacht reported on 7 January 1944 the fate of the Soviet internee Dobrolyubov in late November 1943. After a failed escape from Wauwilermoos, Dobrolyubov was condemned to the punishment cell. Because he was sick, Dobrolyubov asked to be sent to the camp's sickroom, but this was denied by Béguin. When Dobrolyubov argued, a dog was sent in, pulling him to the ground and tearing his clothes. A guard kicked the internee lying on the ground before Dobrolyubov was sent to the punishment cell.

Symforian Dziedic, a Polish lieutenant, was voluntarily returned to Switzerland after fleeing to France. After a second attempt to escape at the end of 1943, he was imprisoned in Wauwilermoos again. Béguin locked Dziedic, as described by the lieutenant, in an "arrest local beside the pigsty". Dziedic had to take off his uniform and put on rags, and was paraded through the camp.

In the second half of December 1943, the then 26 Soviet internees were sent, along with other detainees, to fetch wood from the forest. They were accompanied by several guards with dogs who ordered the soldiers to collect significantly more wood than normal and take it to the prison camp, 1.5 kilometres (0.9 mi) from the forest. The Soviet internees refused to comply with this, and a guard fired his gun into the air and set the dogs on his prisoners. For this alleged resistance, soldier Malfejw was detained for ten days in the punishment cell.

In a fight among inmates of barrack 29 on 28 September 1944, a 27-year-old Soviet internee was shot by the guards and another wounded by two bullets.

Robert Gamperl, probably a German refugee, reached Switzerland in November 1943. He and other internees in camp Lindenhof-Witzwil had refused to work. He was "punished with twenty days sharp arrest and transfer to the prison camp Wauwilermoos for three months" on the grounds that the detainees had wanted to force an investigation of the camp's "undemocratic and inhumane conditions". On 30 April 1944 Gamperl asked the Swiss Commissariat for Internment by letter to "review the real reasons, a hearing by the legal officer and reprieve to the clarification of the matter". His letter was never forwarded from Wauwilermoos; neither were letters from Alfred Friedrich and Josef Haslinger.

Jules Keller, a medical student, had deserted from the German Army. From Wauwilermoos he sent at least five requests between 23 August and 2 November 1944 to the Federal Commissioner for Internment. Keller asked for health reasons to spend internment near his aunts in Zürich. He argued that because of a chronic gastrointestinal disease he was "cramped and incapacitated". He asked, supported by further justifications and medical certificates, to be transferred to a nursing home. His letters were never answered; similarly unanswered were three letters sent in August and September 1944 by Josef Dudkowiak, an officer of the German Air Force. Dudkowiak had deserted after four and a half years, after he had denounced his superior officer for corruption. Dudkowiak also said that he had been sent to the Wauwilermoos penal camp without any explanations.

On the occasion of a lecture in front of Swiss officers Béguin explained his "art of bulk handling" (German: Kunst der Massenbehandlung) on 26 June 1944:

115 internees refused to work. Three times we gave the command to work. It was refused. We examined all 115 men's pockets, left nothing therein as the handkerchiefs, and we locked all in a barrack. We told them at the same time, that they only would get food when they were working. During 14 days we left these 115 men without any food. On the 14th day, they told us to die. Our answer was: Since man can live 24 days without food and drink, we'll order the doctor to day 23. Some hours later, they demanded to eat. We said: There are 57 shovels and 58 pickaxes. If you'll have worked for an hour, you'll get food. An hour later, after 60 minutes of work, 114 men were eating. The 115th [man] endured 17 days. Then he ate.

A US military memo of 1944 mentioned the conditions in Wauwilermoos as "worse than in enemy prison camps" and confirmed the first-hand impressions. The "meals consisted of watered-down soups and scorched stale bread". The sanitary circumstances were subpar: for instance, the latrines were just trenches, very unsanitary, and to clean them the trenches were hosed down every few weeks. Reportedly, "lice and rats were everywhere and the men got sick with boils due to the unsanitary conditions". They "also lost weight, mostly about 40 pounds". Béguin castigated American internees by "subjecting them to cruel punishments and solitary confinements for minor infractions". The soldiers also were "imprisoned a total of 7 months"; the Hague Convention allowed only 30 days confinement. In addition, the internees did not know the length of their sentences.

2nd Lt. Paul Gambaiana was another USAAF airman sent to the camp. Just before D-Day his aircraft went down. In a telephone interview from his home in Iowa in 2013 Gambaiana said:

[the crew] wanted to get back to our base so we attempted to leave Switzerland, and they got us and put us there. It was a Swiss concentration camp. About the only thing I can remember ... we had cabbage soup which was hot water and two leaves of cabbage floating around...The rest I have put away and forgotten. I'm trying to forget the whole thing.

James Misuraca spoke about the compound of single-storey buildings surrounded by barbed wire, the armed Swiss guards with dogs, and the commandant, "a hater of Americans, a martinet who seemed quite pleased with our predicament". Arriving on 10 October 1944, Misuraca and two other US officers made an escape on 1 November. They had "timed the rounds of the guards, climbed out a window and over wire fences and walked for miles". A US Legation officer then drove them to Genève at the border to France, and on 15 November they reached the Allied lines.

Most of the Wauwilermoos prisoners had never shared their stories until Mears's grandson contacted them.

Survivors reported filthy living quarters, skin rashes and boils, all reported that they were underfed. Some reported being held in solitary for trying to escape. Some went in weighing in the 180s and 190s and came out 50 pounds lighter".

In early December 1944 USAAF First Lieutenant Wally Northfelt was nearing his second month of imprisonment at Wauwilermoos. Northfelt attempted to escape from Switzerland near Geneva in September 1944, but he was apprehended by border guards and confined at Wauwilermoos. After his arrival at the punishment camp, Northfelt quickly tired of the "meager rations of coffee, bread, and thin soup" which he blamed in part for his weight loss of forty pounds during his time in Switzerland. Northfelt said that "he was only able to get enough food to survive by purchasing it off the black market". Northfelt was also ill; sleeping on dirty straw had caused sores all over his body, and he had problems with his prostate gland. Medical care was given by a doctor, Northfelt said, who "specialized in women's cases". Northfelt said Béguin was a "pro-Nazi" who "only cleaned up the camp when inspections by high ranking officers or American dignitaries were announced".

On 3 November 1944 the US embassy was informed of conditions by three American soldiers who had escaped from Wauwilermoos. Delegates of the International Committee of the Red Cross (ICRC) who visited Wauwilermoos "failed to notice much amiss", and ICRC member Frédéric Hefty wrote: "If iron discipline is the norm, there is also a certain sense of justice and understanding that helps with the re-education and improvement of the difficult elements sent there".

The reports contained statements from internees that the camp was "a relaxing place that they would happily return to". However, "the internees provided their statements in return for favours from Béguin". The conditions in the camp were not reported correctly. "Switzerland's wartime general, Henri Guisan, demanded that all Red Cross reports about the internment camps be submitted to army censors first if delegates wanted access" notes historian Dwight S. Mears. The American military attaché in Bern warned Marcel Pilet-Golaz, Swiss foreign minister in 1944, that "the mistreatment inflicted on US aviators could lead to 'navigation errors' during bombing raids over Germany".

The ICRC inspected the camp on several occasions, headed by Swiss Army Colonel Auguste Rilliet. The inspection team simply noted that sanitary conditions could be improved, and that prisoners were not aware of the length of their sentences or why they were in the camp in the first place. Immediately prior to the removal of the commandant in September 1945 Rilliet rated the camp conditions unsatisfactory. Wauwilermoos was the subject of official protests by the United States, Great Britain, Poland, and Italy, as well as a barrier to the normalisation of diplomatic relations with the USSR. Numerous Swiss citizens reported that the conditions at Wauwilermoos were in violation of the 1929 Geneva Conventions, including a Swiss Army medical officer, an officer on the Swiss Army's General Staff, and the editors of two Swiss newspapers.

Starting in 1942 on-site inspections had been carried out by the Swiss officials. For instance Major Humbert, army doctor (Militärarzt) and head physician in the Seeland district of the Swiss Federal Commissioner of Internment and Hospitalization (FCIH), mentioned in three reports in January and February 1942, the "enormous morbidity" in the penal camp: "The moral atmosphere in the camp is absolutely untenable". Major Humbert also noted the despotic punishment catalogue and psychological deficits of the commandant of the prison camp, Captain André Béguin. His complaints resulted in no action by the authorities, and in February 1942 Humbert was dismissed.

In the same year an investigation of Béguin was conducted because of possible espionage in favour of Nazi Germany. Although Colonel Robert Jaquillard, chief of the counterintelligence service of the army, spoke against the retention of Captain Béguin as commander of the camp, his report came to the chief of the legal department of the Swiss federal internment department, Major Florian Imer. After an inspection of the camp, Imer noted that "in particular the allegations of Major Humbert were exaggerated for the most part". Another report in January 1943 noted the camp's poor sanitary condition. At the end of 1944, Ruggero Dollfus, interim Swiss Federal commissioner for internment (Internierungskommissär), complained again about the poor sanitation. Among others Dollfus noted that the Red Cross auxiliary packets were confiscated by Béguin, and nearly 500 letters from and to the airmen had been withheld by the commandant. Béguin, was suspended and banned from entering the camp effective 5 September 1945. On 24 September he was taken into custody. On 20 February 1946, a military court sentenced Béguin to three and a half years in prison.

== André Béguin ==
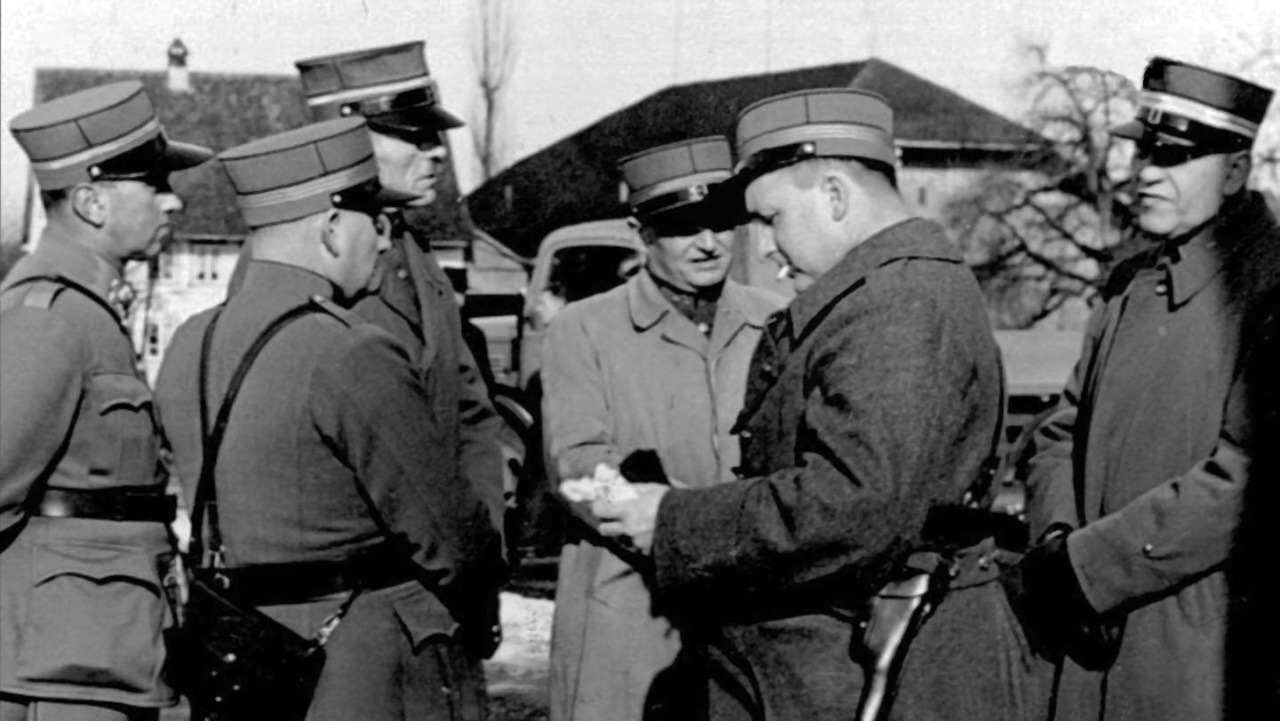
Béguin with Swiss Army officers

Captain André Béguin was a member of the National Union. He had previously lived in Munich, Germany. "He was known to wear the Nazi uniform and to sign his correspondence with 'Heil Hitler'". He was investigated by the Swiss counter-intelligence service for his pro-Nazi political views. Nevertheless, he was retained in command at Wauwilermoos. While in command Béguin "publicly berated Americans, sentenced them to solitary confinement, and denied them Red Cross parcels and mail".

Despite his tarnished record, in 1940 Béguin obtained work as a civilian employee of the Swiss Federal Commissioner of Internment and Hospitalization (FCIH) There he translated artillery manuals, which led to his second commission in the Swiss Army as an orderly officer.

This ill-advised appointment was almost certainly due to the national state of emergency and manpower shortage in the Swiss Army, although this does not explain the decision to place Béguin in charge of soldiers of other nationalities.

In July 1941 Béguin was appointed commandant of the Wauwilermoos penal camp, where he had no sympathy for the prisoners under his charge, particularly Americans. As his correspondence revealed he found "American internees to be undisciplined and ungrateful", claiming that they were "too spoiled by their stay in hotels in the mountains and do not understand purely military treatment". Béguin also scorned the American airmen because of their lack of professionalism, saying that:

due to their brief military education they ... are specialists, but not soldiers [and] do not know of barracks life, nor that of soldier campaigning; they are uniformed workers and technicians who service aircraft.

In Béguin's view there was an absence of "elementary courtesy and politeness... as painful for us as it is for them".

Captain Béguin was suspended and banned from the camp on 5 September 1945, because he had apparently burned files in the camp on 3 September 1945. On 24 September he was arrested and taken into custody. On 20 February 1946, the Divisionsgericht Zürich military court sentenced him to prison for 42 months, and he lost his civil rights. In its decision the Swiss military court (Divisionsgericht) described Béguin as a "crook, embezzler, con-man and inhuman". He was convicted of dishonoring Switzerland and its army, administrative misdemeanors, embezzlement, and abuse of authority. The US War Crimes Office also collected "multiple war crimes accusations" against Béguin, but the Allied authorities never attempted to prosecute the commander of the Wauwilermoos camp "due to lack of jurisdiction".

== Aftermath ==
Under pressure from the United States, in late 1944 Switzerland improved the conditions for American internees. Although Béguin was sentenced for misconduct, he was never charged for his actions as commandant of the penal camp from spring 1941 to September 1945. The responsible Swiss authorities were also never accused. Only in 1949 did internees receive the same rights as prisoners of war.

Then President of the Swiss Confederation Kaspar Villiger expressed his "deepest regrets", and said that the camp commander had lacked "subtle leadership qualities", while offering his apologies on the occasion of an official visit by Dan Culler in 1995. For 70 years there was no memorial to the horrors of the prison camp until a plaque was installed in late 2015.

US Army Major Dwight Mears's grandfather, Lt. George Mears, was also held at the Wauwilermoos prison in 1944. Major Mears was injured in a helicopter crash during a security mission in Iraq in 2003. While still at West Point, a history class motivated him to conduct first-person historical research. He sought out his grandfather's surviving crew members, researched the story of his grandfather, and photographed approximately 30,000 documents from archives in Bern, Berlin and Washington D.C. Major Mears fought diligently for 15 years to get the Wauwilermoos airmen recognised as POWs. Major Mears published his work in 2012 in a PhD thesis on the American internees in Switzerland.

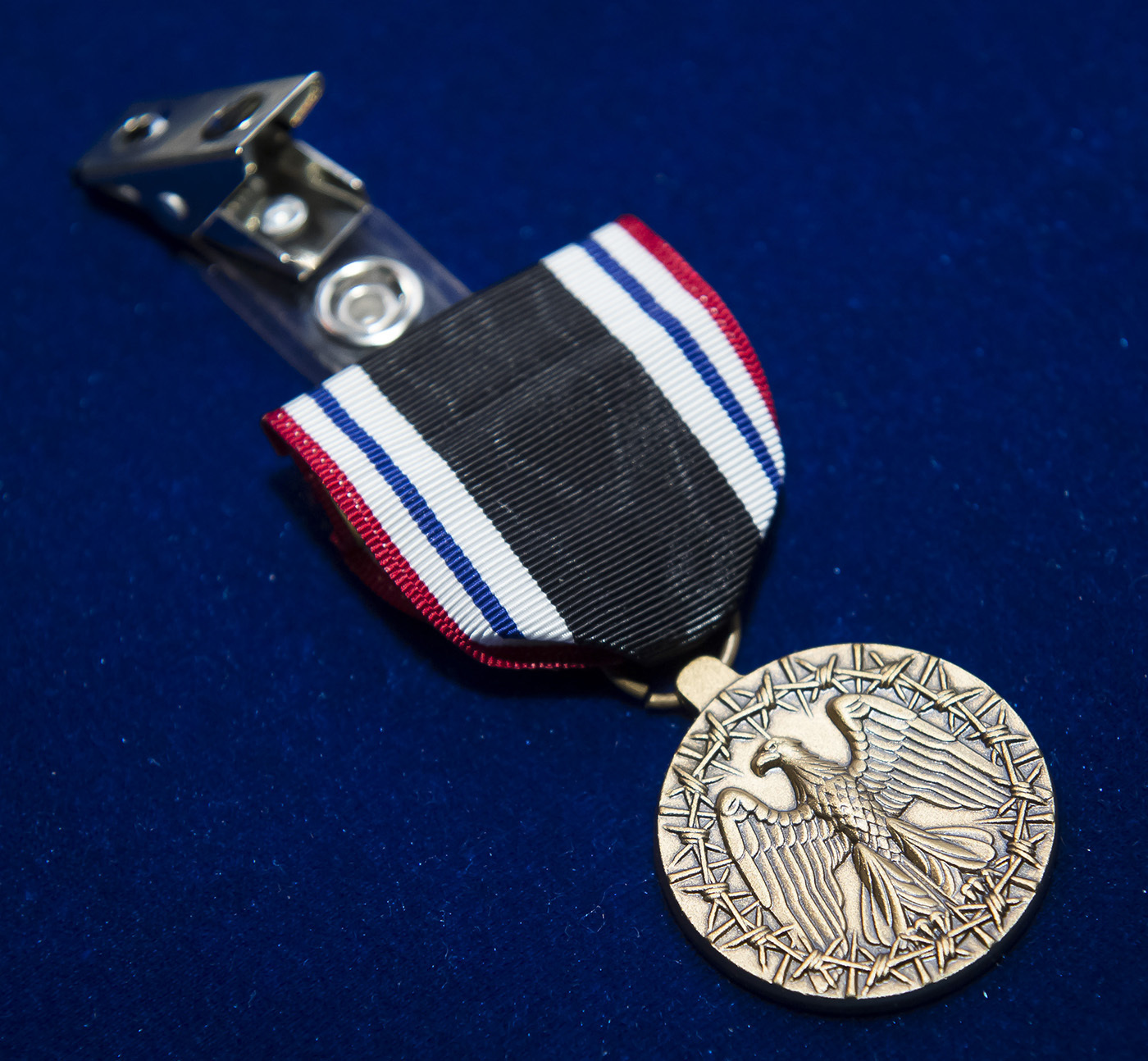
US Prisoner of War Medal

According to Mears, when the POW Medal was created in 1985:

Only service members held by enemies in declared armed conflicts were eligible. It was widened in 1989 to also include those imprisoned by hostile foreign forces under similar conditions... [But] since Switzerland was neutral — and therefore not hostile to the U.S. — the internees were not eligible for the decoration.

Mears said in an interview to the Air Force Times in November 2013 that his efforts had gained the support of Ann Petersen, former Air Force general counsel, as well as Eric Fanning, acting Secretary, and General Mark Welsh III. The fiscal 2013 National Defense Authorization Act included an amendment allowing the award of the POW Medal to "any service member held captive under conditions 'comparable to those circumstances under which persons have generally been held captive by enemy armed forces during periods of armed conflict'".

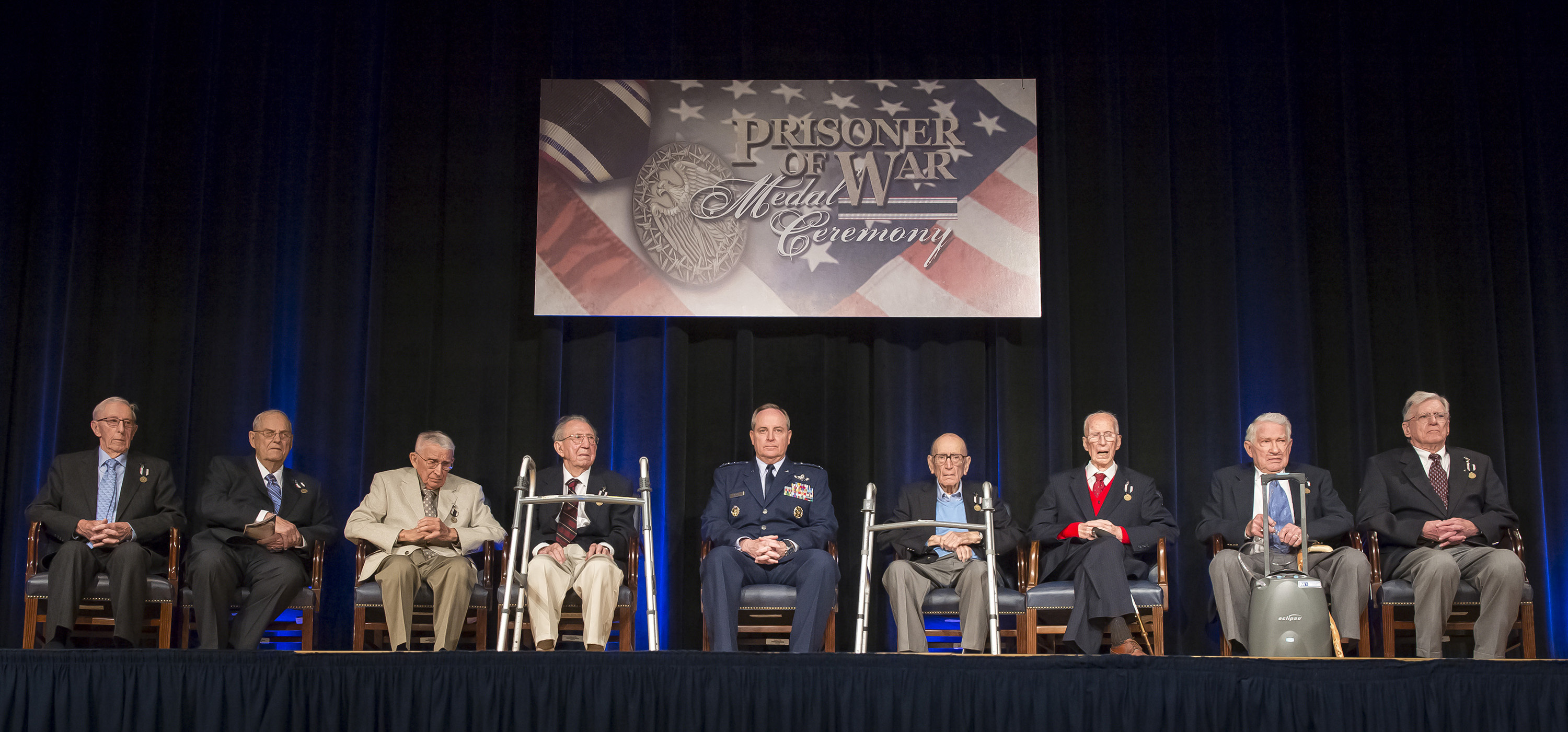
General Mark A. Welsh III hosted an office call for the eight Army Air Corps members before presenting them with the Prisoner of War Medal during a ceremony at the Pentagon on 30 April 2014.

The Pentagon awarded 143 posthumous POW Medals to World War II veterans who were held in the Wauwilermoos punishment camp: On 30 April 2014 eight survivors of the camp were awarded the Prisoner of War Medal, "thus being recognized for the suffering they endured during their imprisonment... the first time that the medal was granted to soldiers that were held prisoners in a friendly country". General Mark A. Welsh III, the 20th Chief of Staff of the United States Air Force, hosted an office call for the eight Army Air Corps members before presenting them with the Prisoner of War medal during a ceremony at the Pentagon. The eight aviators who received the medal were: Sgt. William G. Blackburn, Tech. Sgt. Alva H. Moss, 1st Lt. Paul J. Gambaiana, retired Lt. Col. James I. Misuraca, retired Maj. James V. Moran, 1st Lt. James F. Mahon, Staff Sgt. John G. Fox and Sgt. George E. Thursby. "They served each other and our country proudly," the Chief of Staff said, "They saved a world and they inspired a nation."

== Wauwilermoos penal camp in film and television ==
The 1993 Swiss documentary Helden vom Himmel first mentioned that dark chapter of Swiss history. On 27 October 2015 the Swiss television channel Schweizer Radio und Fernsehen SRF broadcast Wauwilermoos: Kriegsgefangene im Luzerner Mittelland. One day later it broadcast the Swiss documentary film Erzwungene Landung, or Notlandung, (Forced Landing) by Daniel Wyss. The fates of the internees in Wauwilermoos are widely unknown to the public. In publications on Swiss history the internment in Wauwilermoos has not been explored in depth. In reports Wauwilermoos is rarely mentioned, and Swiss politics has hardly taken notice, except to the 1944 interpellation from M. Brawand, and the reports by two Swiss newspapers in 1944 and 1946. Daniel Wyss, the documentary director, contacted Major Dwight Mears, participated in the ceremony in April 2014 in Washington D.C., and met the eight survivors of the camp.

== Strafanstalt Wauwilermoos ==
From September 1945 Swiss prisoners were housed in the barracks. Since 1947 Wauwilermoos has been the site of a prison that was rebuilt in the early 1980s as a semi-open institution. The Wauwilermoos penitentiary (German: Strafanstalt Wauwilermoos) also serves as a deportation centre.

== See also ==
- Akte Grüninger
- Bombings of Switzerland in World War II

== Literature (selected works) ==
- Cathryn J. Prince: Shot from the Sky: American POWs in Switzerland. Kindle Edition. Naval Institute Press/Amazon Media EU S.à r.l., 2015, ASIN B00ZSDPIHE.
- Rob Morris: Prisoner of the Swiss:: A World War II Airman's Story. CreateSpace Independent Publishing Platform, 2014, ISBN 978-1-500-68354-2.
- Dwight S. Mears: Interned or imprisoned? The successes and failures of international law in the treatment of American internees in Switzerland, 1943–45. Ann Arbor, Michigan: UMI, [University Microfilms International], 2010, ISBN 978-1-109-74571-9.
- Rob Morris: Untold Valor. Xlibris Corporation, 2005, ISBN 978-1413472776.
- Roger Anthoine: Infringing Neutrality: The RAF in Switzerland 1940–45 (Revealing History). Tempus 2005, ISBN 978-0-752-43420-9.
- Stephen Tanner: Refuge from the Reich: American Airmen and Switzerland During World War II. Da Capo Press, illustrated edition, 2001, ISBN 978-1-885-11970-4.
- Daniel L. Culler: Black Hole of Wauwilermoos: An Airman's Story. Sky & Sage Books, Green Valley 1995. ISBN 978-1-887-77601-1.
- Daniel Culler and Rob Morris: Prisoner of the Swiss: A World War II Airman's Story. Casemate, Philadelphia, 2017. ISBN 978-1-61200-554-6.
- Peter Kamber: Schüsse auf die Befreier. Die 'Luftguerilla' der Schweiz gegen die Alliierten 1943–45. Rotpunktverlag 1993, ISBN 3-85869-092-9.
- Jürg Hofer: Die Strafanstalt Wauwilermoos LU. Sauerländer 1978, ISBN 978-3-794-11844-1.
