= Wauwil =

- Municipality
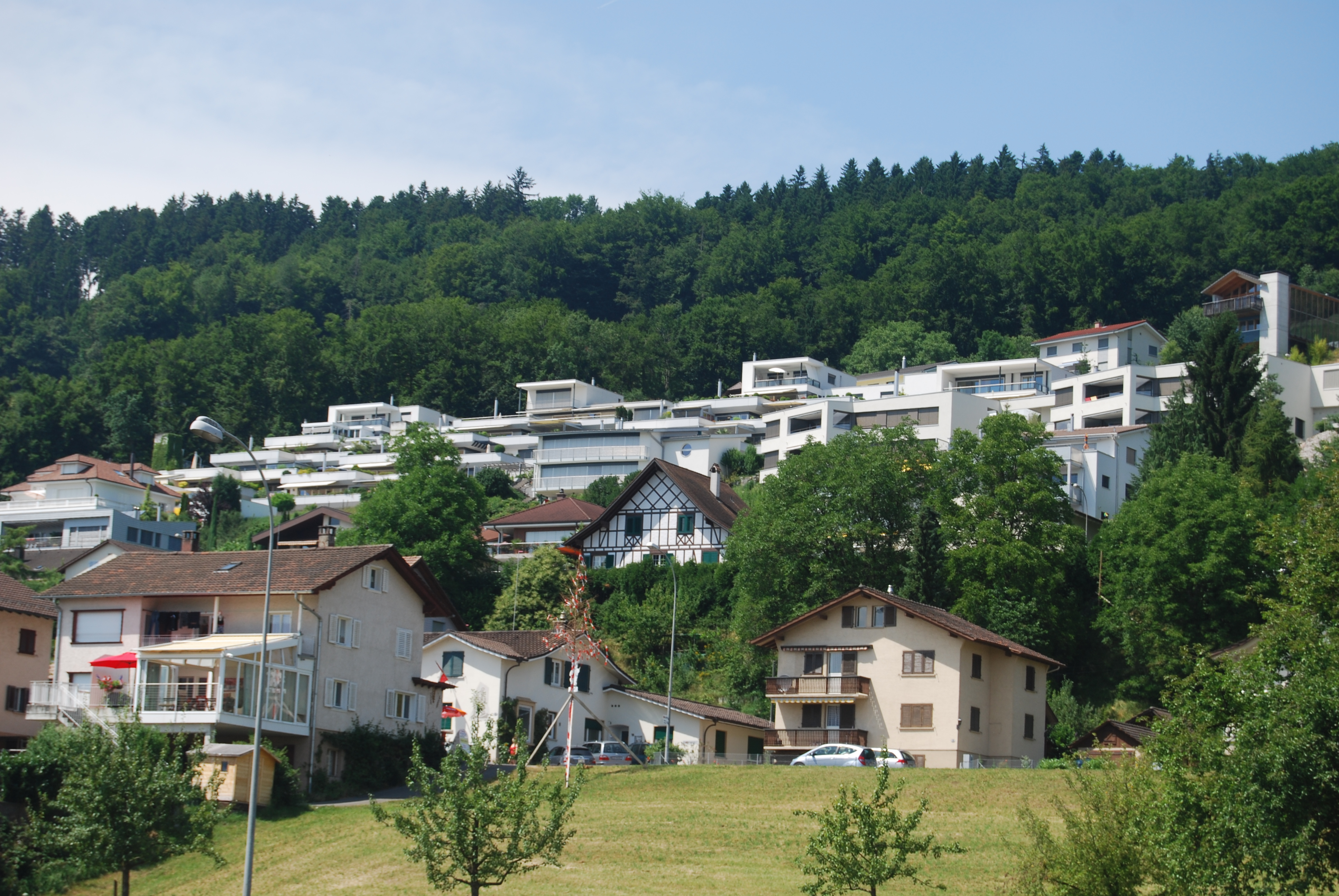

- Coat of arms
- Location of Wauwil
- Location within Switzerland Location within Canton of Lucerne
- Coordinates: 47°11′N 8°01′E
- Country: Switzerland
- Canton: Lucerne
- District: Willisau

Area
  - Total: 2.95 km^{2} (1.14 sq mi)
- Elevation: 539 m (1,768 ft)

Population (December 2020)
  - Total: 2,380
  - Density: 807/km^{2} (2,090/sq mi)
- Time zone: UTC+01:00 (CET)
  - Summer (DST): UTC+02:00 (CEST)
- Postal code: 6242
- SFOS number: 1146
- ISO 3166 code: CH-LU
- Surrounded by: Dagmersellen, Egolzwil, Ettiswil, Mauensee, Schötz
- Website: www.wauwil.ch

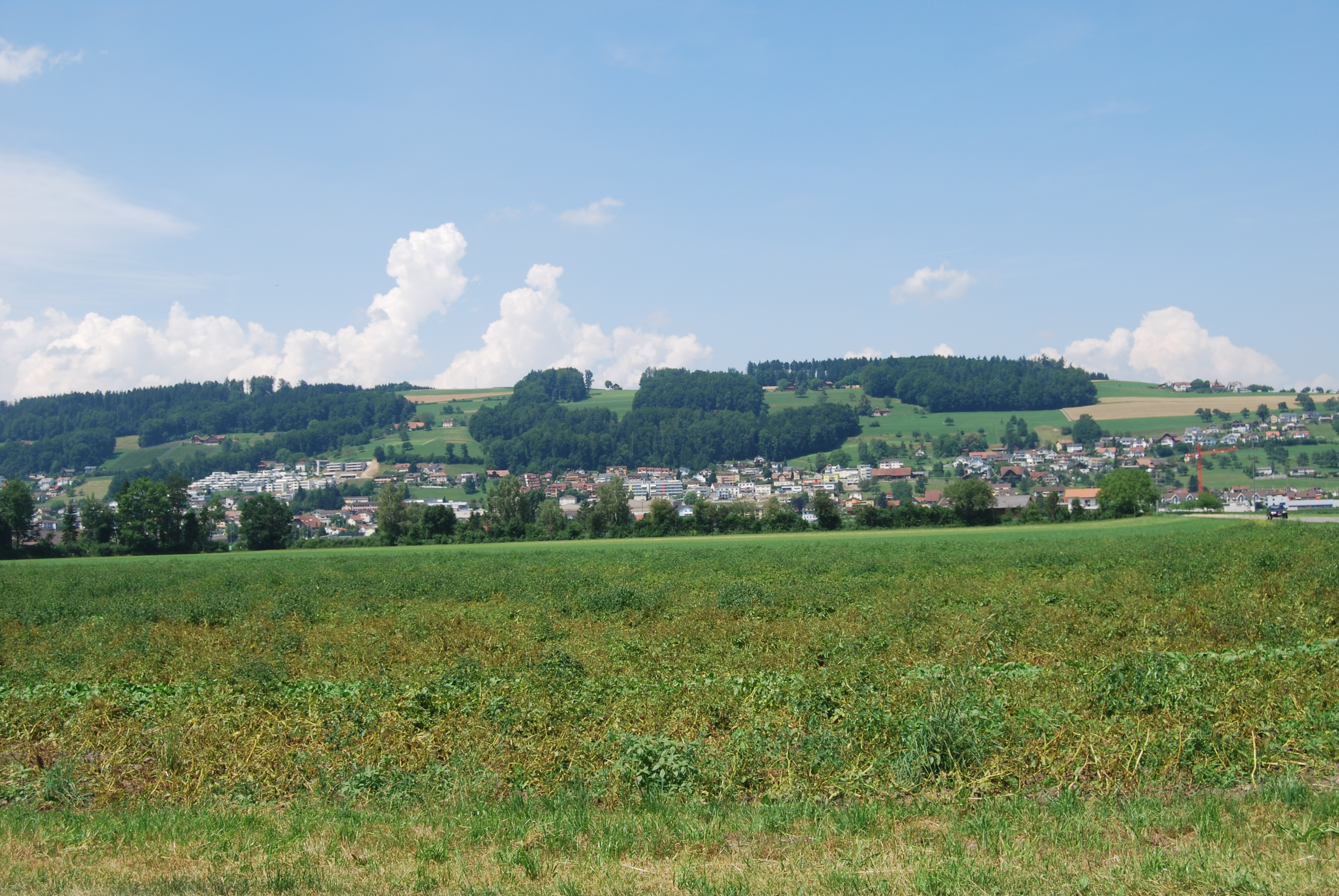
Wauwil

Wauwil is a municipality in the district of Willisau in the canton of Lucerne in Switzerland.

== Geography ==
Aerial view (1964)

Wauwil has an area, as of 2006, of 2.9 km^{2} (1.1 sq mi). Of this area, 72.1% is used for agricultural purposes, while 9.9% is forested. The rest of the land, (18%) is settled. In the 1997 land survey, 10.17% of the total land area was forested. Of the agricultural land, 69.15% is used for farming or pastures, while 2.71% is used for orchards or vine crops. Of the settled areas, 10.85% is covered with buildings, 2.37% is industrial, 0.34% is classed as special developments, 0.68% is parks or greenbelts and 3.73% is transportation infrastructure.

== History ==
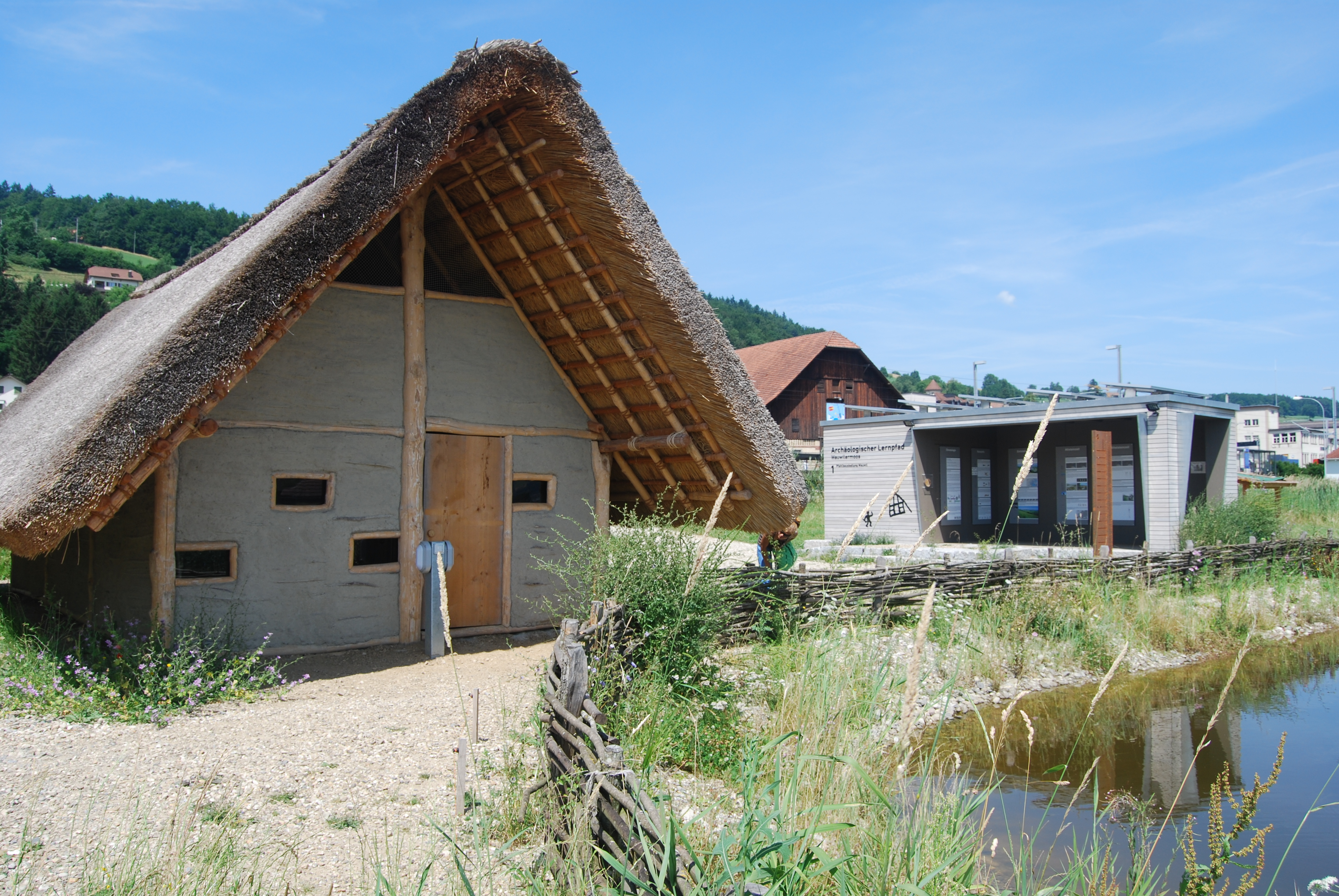
Reconstruction of a pile dwelling house of the Wauwilermoos settlement at the open-air museum

The prehistoric lakeside settlement Wauwilermoos is listed as a Swiss heritage site of national significance. Also known as Egolzwil 3, the serial site of 56 sites in Switzerland is also part of the UNESCO World Heritage Site Prehistoric Pile dwellings around the Alps.

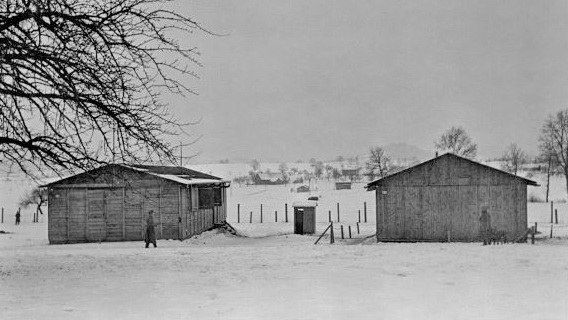
Wauwilermoos camp assumably in winter 1943/44

During World War II, mainly Allied soldiers who were caught after their escape from the Swiss internment camps, were detained in the prison camp Wauwilermoos. Re-established in 1947 as a penitentiary, it was rebuilt in the early 1980s as a semi-open institution where custodial sentences are carried out. The penitentiary (German: Strafanstalt Wauwilermoos) also serves as a deportation center.

== Demographics ==
Wauwil has a population (as of 31 December 2020) of 2,380. As of 2007, 483 or about 28.5% are not Swiss citizens. Over the last 10 years the population has grown at a rate of 0.5%. Most of the population (as of 2000) speaks German (81.4%), with Serbo-Croatian being second most common ( 6.7%) and Albanian being third ( 4.3%).

In the 2007 election the most popular party was the CVP which received 39.7% of the vote. The next three most popular parties were the SVP (27.3%), the FDP (22%) and the SPS (5.5%).

The age distribution, as of 2008, in Wauwil is; 409 people or 24.2% of the population is 0–19 years old. 463 people or 27.3% are 20–39 years old, and 603 people or 35.6% are 40–64 years old. The senior population distribution is 157 people or 9.3% are 65–79 years old, 50 or 3% are 80–89 years old and 11 people or 0.6% of the population are 90+ years old.

In Wauwil about 53.9% of the population (between age 25-64) have completed either non-mandatory upper secondary education or additional higher education (either university or a Fachhochschule).

As of 2000 there are 588 households, of which 144 households (or about 24.5%) contain only a single individual. 90 or about 15.3% are large households, with at least five members. As of 2000 there were 304 inhabited buildings in the municipality, of which 255 were built only as housing, and 49 were mixed use buildings. There were 159 single family homes, 45 double family homes, and 51 multi-family homes in the municipality. Most homes were either two (143) or three (70) story structures. There were only 24 single story buildings and 18 four or more story buildings.

Wauwil has an unemployment rate of 2.23%. As of 2005, there were 159 people employed in the primary economic sector and about 22 businesses involved in this sector. 113 people are employed in the secondary sector and there are 17 businesses in this sector. 197 people are employed in the tertiary sector, with 44 businesses in this sector. As of 2000 53.4% of the population of the municipality were employed in some capacity. At the same time, females made up 43.1% of the workforce.

In the 2000 census the religious membership of Wauwil was; 1,135 (67.9%) were Roman Catholic, and 100 (6.%) were Protestant, with an additional 166 (9.93%) that were of some other Christian faith. There are 103 individuals (6.16% of the population) who are Muslim. Of the rest; there were 19 (1.14%) individuals who belong to another religion (not listed), 56 (3.35%) who do not belong to any organized religion, 92 (5.51%) who did not answer the question.

== Weather ==
Wauwil has an average of 128.1 days of rain per year and on average receives 1,006 mm (39.6 in) of precipitation. The wettest month is June during which time Wauwil receives an average of 115 mm (4.5 in) of precipitation. During this month there is precipitation for an average of 12.4 days. The month with the most days of precipitation is May, with an average of 13.1, but with only 101 mm (4.0 in) of precipitation. The driest month of the year is October with an average of 66 mm (2.6 in) of precipitation over 12.4 days.
