= Wauwilermoos pile dwelling settlement (Egolzwil 3) =

Prehistoric settlement in the Alps

Coordinates: 47°10′56.55″N 8°0′59.36″E

Wauwilermoos or Egolzwil 3 is one of the 111 serial sites of the UNESCO World Heritage Site Prehistoric pile dwellings around the Alps, of which are 56 located in Switzerland.

== Geography ==
The site is located on the former Wauwilersee lakeshore in the municipalities of Egolzwil, Wauwil and Schötz in the Canton of Luzern in Switzerland. The settlement comprises 0.65 hectares (1.61 acres), and the buffer zone including the lake area comprises 56.82 hectares (140.41 acres) in all.

Around 20000 BC a branch of the Reuss glacier formed a valley whose deepest point was approximately 57 metres (187 ft) below the present surface. At Schötz the glacier stopped, as shown by the impressive moraines. During the retreat of the glacier, meltwater jammed between the moraines. Thus in the Wauwilermoos plain three lakes were formed: Wauwilersee, Hagimoos and Mauensee; latter still exists. The meltwater outsourced enormous amounts of sand, so that the lakes never were particularly deep. The depth of Wauwilersee amounted only to about 15 metres (49 ft). To 17000 BC the area was finally free of ice, and soon first pioneer plants settled, such as dwarf birch and mountain avens on, typically for a post-glacial tundra landscape. Circa 14000 BC the three lakes started silting up with sand, lake marl and peat. As a result of climatic changes, the lake levels have fluctuated over the course of the Stone Age era. The water level rose several times, and the area covered by water increased. On the one hand, the waves formed the beach ridges between Wauwil and Ettiswil. On the other hand, the radicals old Stone Age and middle Stone Age settlement sites were flooded by the rising water, wiped and finally covered with lake sediments. The Neolithic lake dwellings also were covered with lake sediments. At the former Wauwilersee lake area, peat was mined between 1820 and about 1920, and the lake was drained around 1859. To date, the area is still drained in order to make it usable for agriculture. The moorlands in Wauwilermoos therefore disappeared except for small residual areas. Since July 2009 there is also a waterbird and migratory bird reserve of national importance, to protect migratory and waterfowl year-round living in Switzerland.

== Description ==
Egolzwil 3 is one of the earliest lake-dwelling settlements in Switzerland. Therefore, it contains an important archaeological Egolzwil culture reference assemblage. The houses in this region were built directly on the ground, as the well-preserved house floors with hearths prove. The village was inhabited only for six years, and thus shows a short but precisely defined episode within the Neolithic period. Moreover, it provides favourable preservation conditions for wood and other organic materials such as plants and bone. The remains of the settlements are an important site for palaeo-ecological studies on the Wauwil bog (German: Wauwilermoos).

== Excavations and finds ==
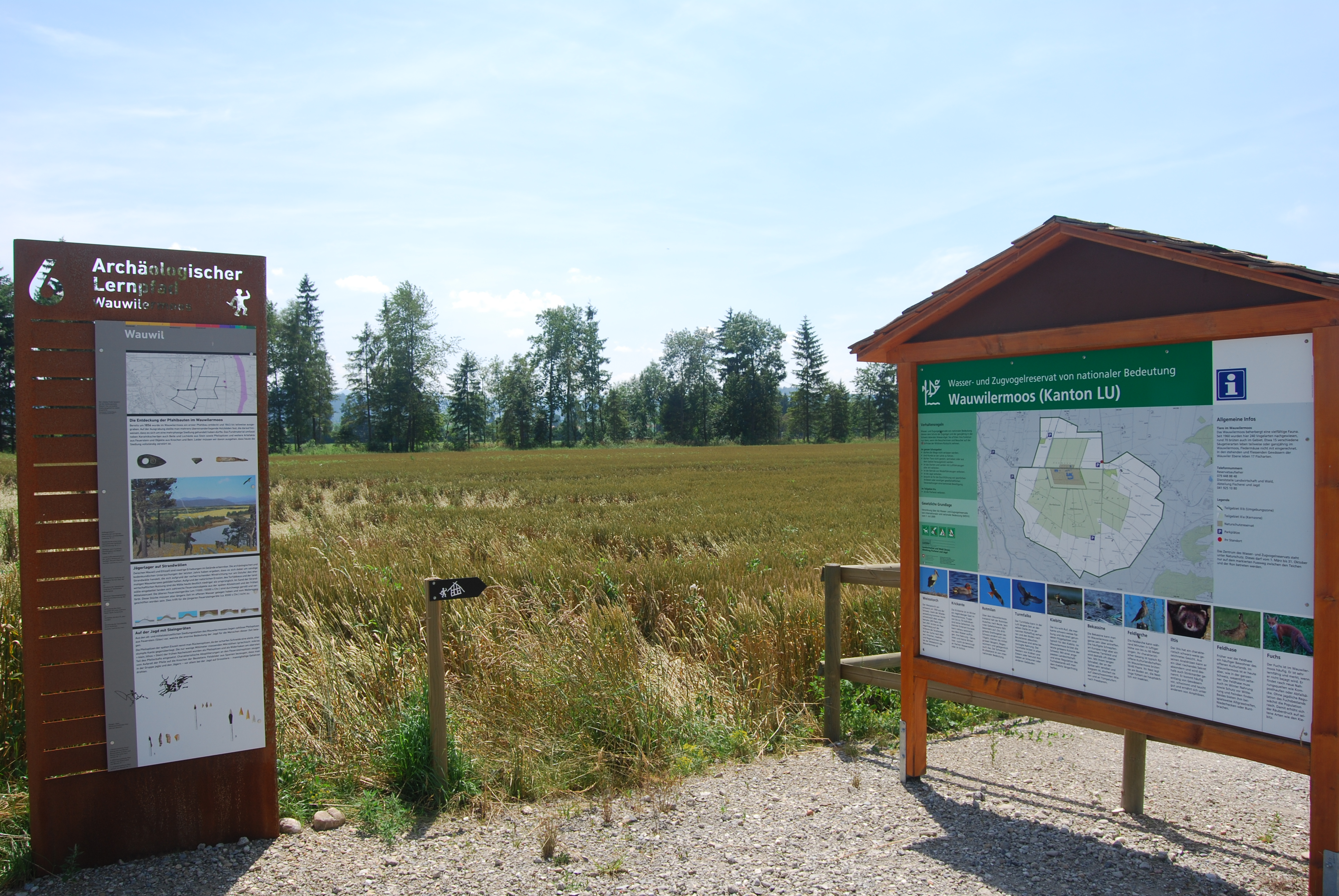
Wauwilermoos open-air museum

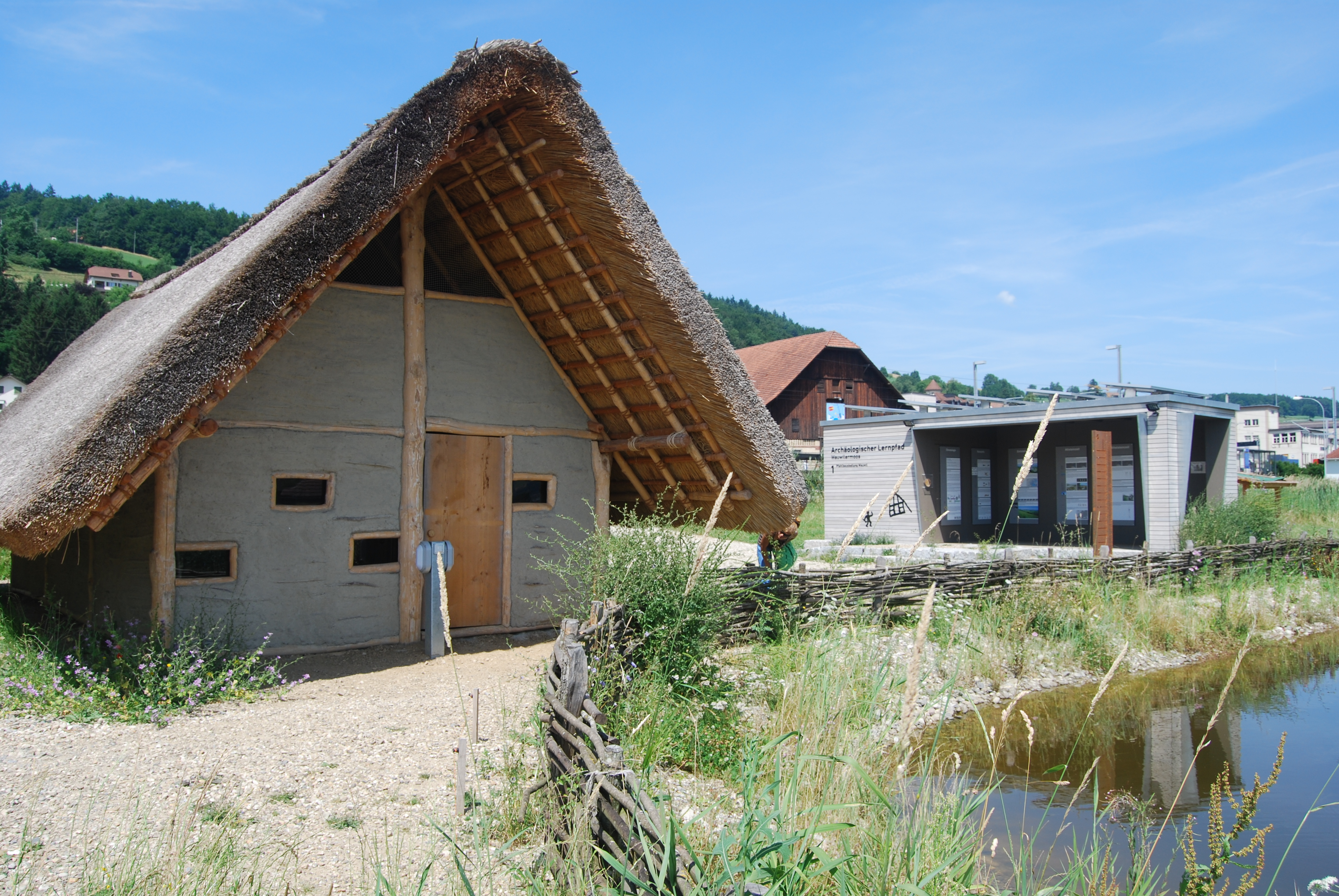

After the draining of the lake in the mid-19th century, first Stone Age settlements have been found in the vast moorland. Due to the excavations that were carried out until 1929, the Wauwil plain became known as an archaeological region. A research based on scientific criteria began in the early 1930s with excavations in Schötz and at the Neolithic site Egolzwil E2 under the direction of Hans Reinerth. Emil Vogt started systematic excavations from 1950 to 1966 on the settlement sites E3, E4 and E5. After the excavations under René Wyss in 1965 and 1985–88, eleven Neolithic and 30 Mesolithic sites were known at the Wauwilermoos, at the beginning of the 21st century even more than 120 Stone Age sites.

The first settlements rose after the withdrawal of the Reuss glacier around 13000 BC at six sites. Late Paleolithic (approx. 12000-9000 BC) includes 46 sites situated on an old elevated shoreline of the former lake. These artifacts, among them many burins and typical back and wide lace tee scratches, are attributed to the Fürstein culture. The well-documented Egolzwil culture was named after the Wauwilermoos (E3) site, dated shortly after 4300 BC. In addition to the eponymous locality Egolzwil E3, there are four other settlement sites. The short-lived village was built at the ground level in the sedimentation zone of the lake. Its houses were made of timber ash, oak and alder. The interior was illuminated and heat by a centrally disposed fireplace. The hand-shaped ceramic consisted mainly of pots and bowls with two round-bowed handles and an average volume of 1.8 to 2.8 liters, along with some liquid containers (volume of 6-8 liters) and individual so-called Wauwilerbecher cups. Unique are sickles with a straight wooden handle and diagonally sweeping knives made of flint that was fixed with birch tar, axe shafts, clubs, sticks, furrows, and a textile jewelry container with shells from the Mediterranean area.

== Protection ==
As well as being part of the 56 Swiss sites of the UNESCO World Heritage Site Prehistoric pile dwellings around the Alps, the settlement is also listed in the Swiss inventory of cultural property of national and regional significance as a Class A object of national importance. Hence, the area is provided as a historical site under federal protection, within the meaning of the Swiss Federal Act on the nature and cultural heritage (German: Bundesgesetz über den Natur- und Heimatschutz NHG) of 1 July 1966. Unauthorised researching and purposeful gathering of findings represent a criminal offense according to Art. 24.

== See also ==
- Wauwilermoos internment camp

== Literature ==
- Peter J. Suter, Helmut Schlichtherle et al.: Pfahlbauten – Palafittes – Palafitte. Palafittes, Biel 2009. ISBN 978-3-906140-84-1.
- A. de Capitani, Mathias Seifert, Trivun Sormaz and Werner E. Stöckli: Egolzwil 3, die Keramik der neolithischen Seeufersiedlung. Archaeologische Schriften Luzern 15.1, Kantonsarchäologie Luzern 2013, ISBN 978-3-271-10047-1.
