= Reuss (river) =

River in Switzerland

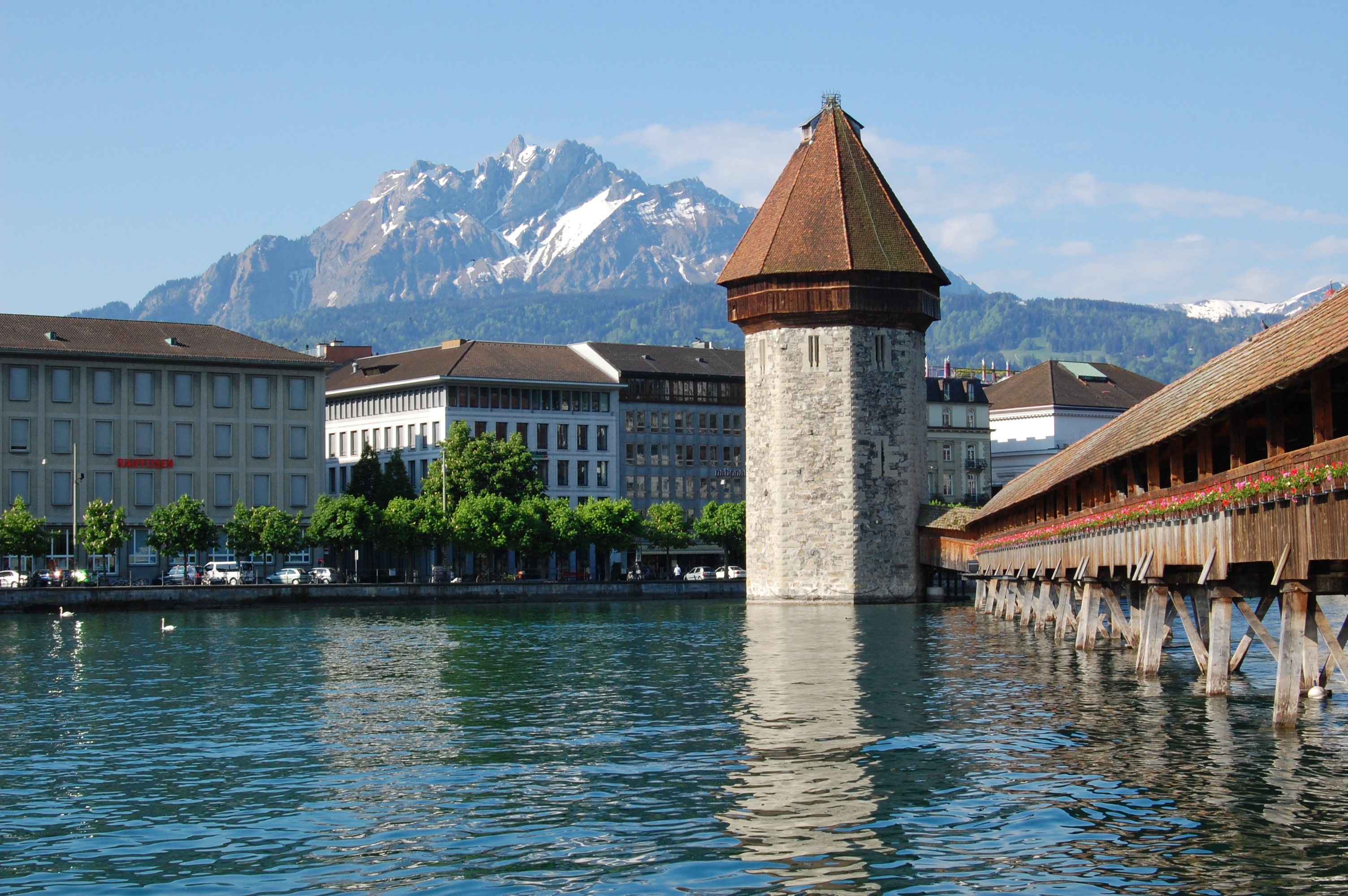
- The Reuss at Lucerne
- Native name: Rüüss (Alemannic German)

Location
- Country: Switzerland
- Cantons: Uri, Lucerne, Aargau
- Settlements: Andermatt (UR), Göschenen (UR), Altdorf (UR), Lucerne (LU), Bremgarten (AG)

Physical characteristics
- Source
  - location: Furkareuss, above Furka Pass, Uri
  - coordinates: 46°33′48″N 8°25′57″E
  - elevation: 2,640 m (8,660 ft)
- Mouth
  - location: Aare at Windisch/Gebenstorf, Aargau
  - coordinates: 47°29′27″N 8°13′55″E
  - elevation: 229 m (751 ft)
- Length: 164.4 km (102.2 mi)
- Basin size: 3,426 km^{2} (1,323 sq mi)
- Discharge
  - location: Mellingen
  - average: 140.4 m^{3}/s (4,960 cu ft/s) (MQ 1935-2013)
  - minimum: 93 m^{3}/s (3,300 cu ft/s) (MNQ 1935-2013), 28.6 m^{3}/s (1,010 cu ft/s) (NNQ, 2006)
  - maximum: 179 m^{3}/s (6,300 cu ft/s) (MHQ 1935-2013), 854 m^{3}/s (30,200 cu ft/s) (HHQ, 2005)

Basin features
- Progression: Aare→ Rhine→ North Sea
- Tributaries
  - left: Göschener Reuss, Meienreuss, Engelberger Aa (Lake Lucerne), Sarner Aa (Lake Lucerne), Kleine Emme
  - right: Gotthardreuss, Unteralpreuss, Chärstelenbach, Schächen, Muota (Lake Lucerne), Lorze, Jonenbach
- Waterbodies: Lake Lucerne, Flachsee

The Reuss (Swiss Standard German: [ˈrɔʏs]; Swiss German: Rüüss) is a river in Switzerland. With a length of 164 kilometres (102 mi) and a drainage basin of 3,426 square kilometres (1,323 sq mi), it is the fourth largest river in Switzerland (after the Rhine, Aare and Rhône). The upper Reuss forms the main valley of the canton of Uri. The course of the lower Reuss runs from Lake Lucerne to the confluence with the Aare at Brugg and Windisch.

The Reuss is one of the four major rivers taking their source in the Gotthard region, along with the Rhine, Ticino and Rhône.

== Geography ==
=== Course ===
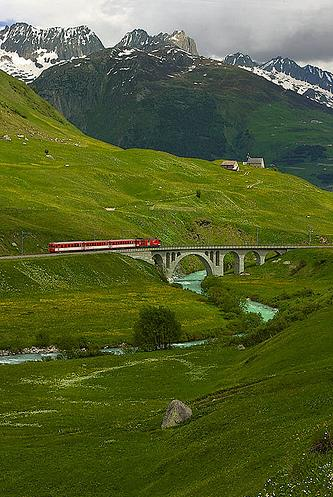
The Furkareuss in the valley Urseren

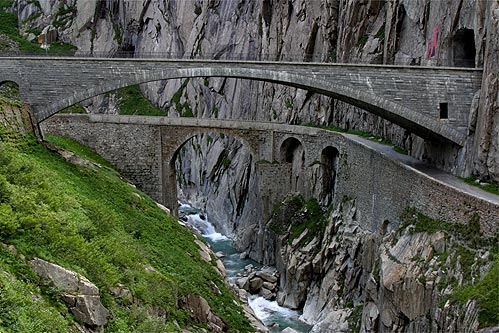
Teufelsbrücke in the Schöllenen Gorge

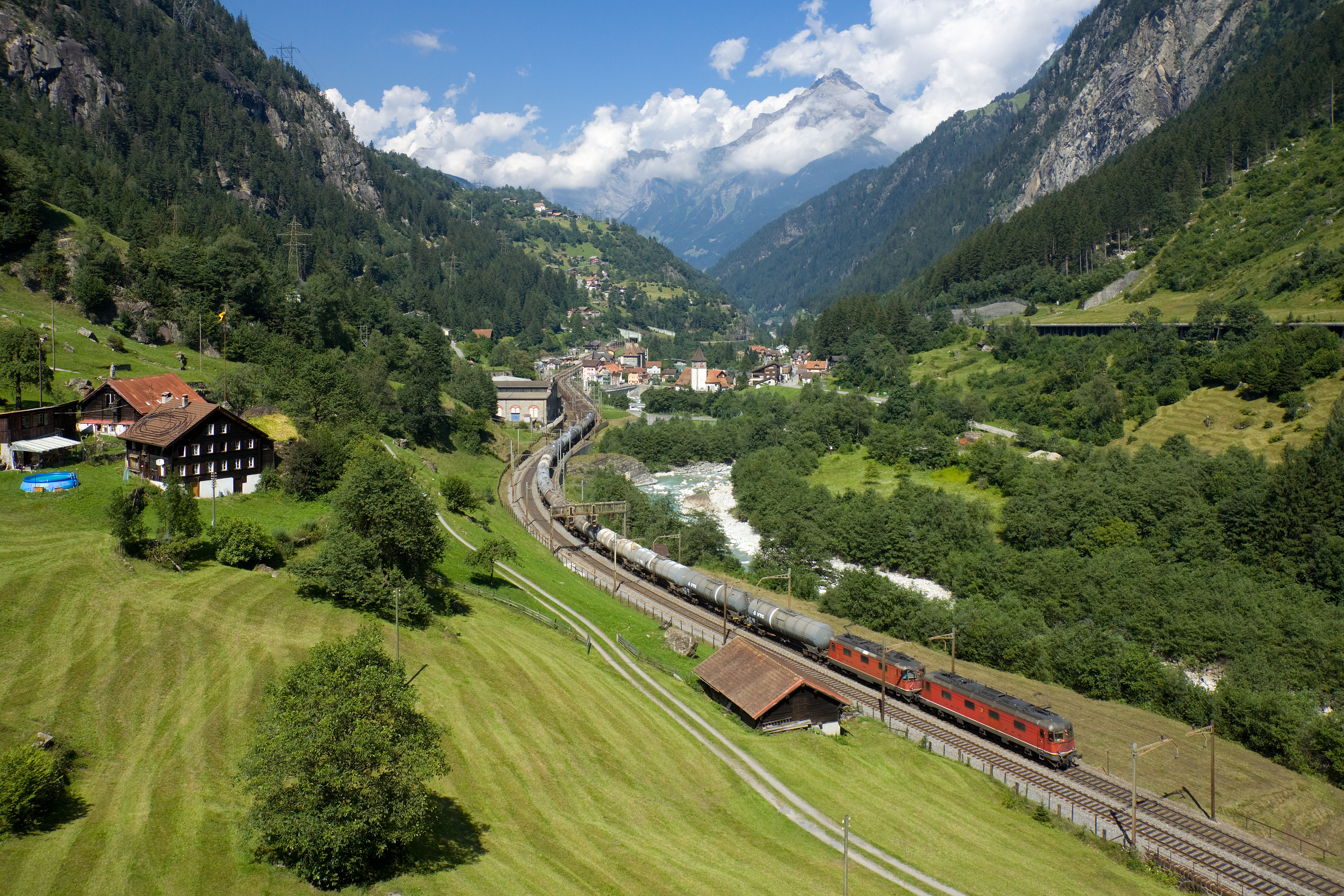
The Reuss near Gurtnellen

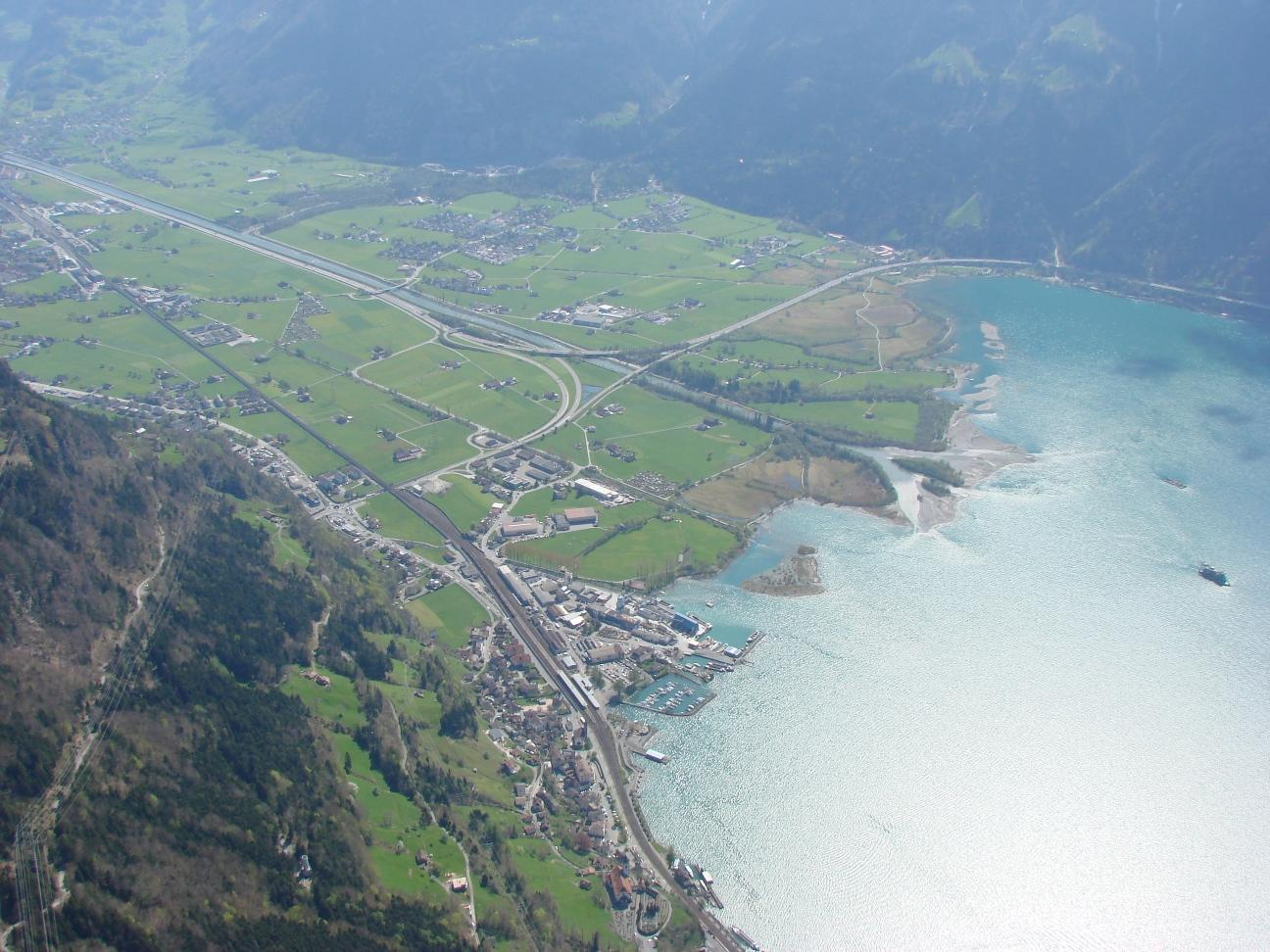
The Reuss entering Lake Lucerne

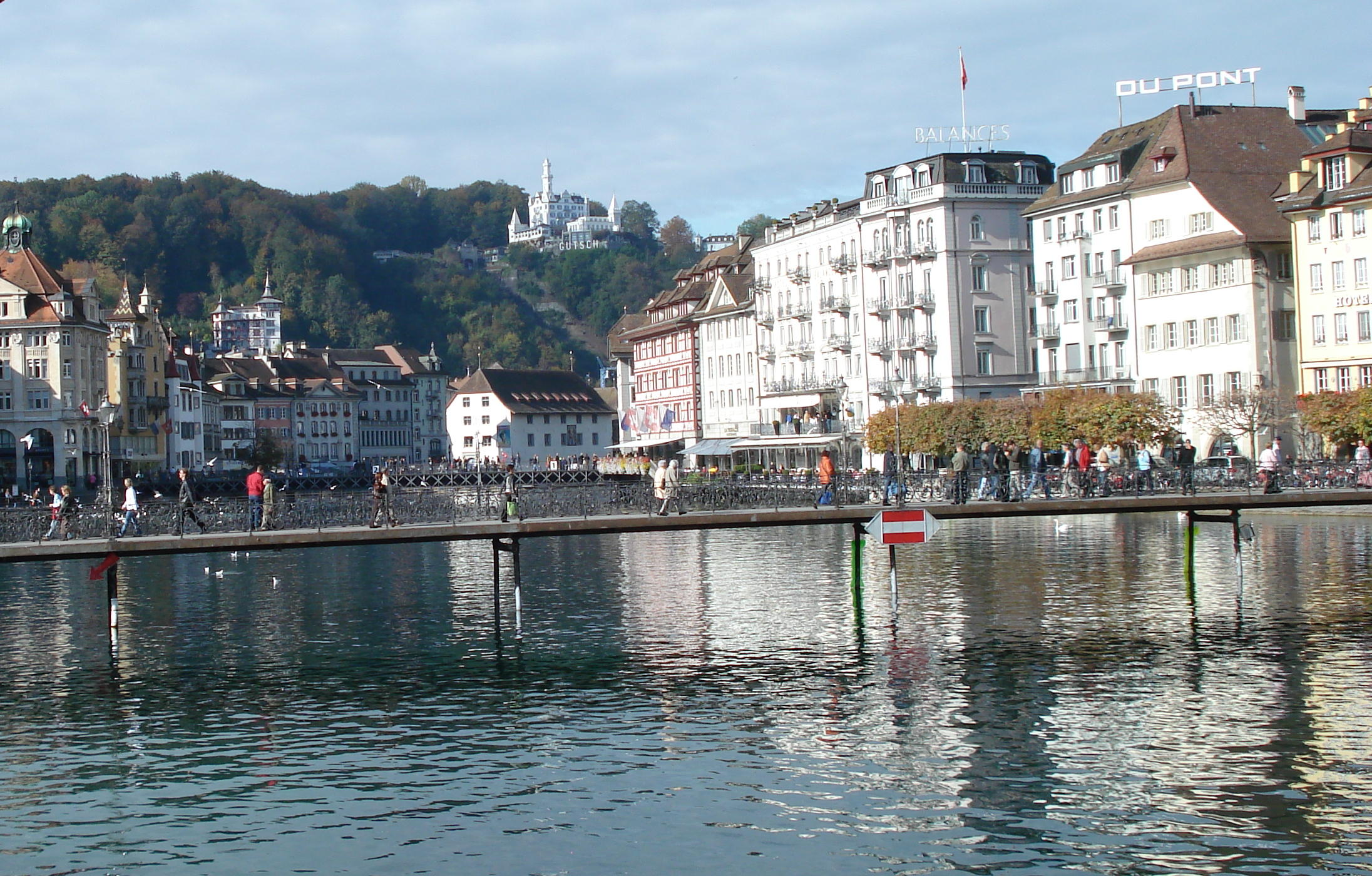
Rathaus-Steg at Lucerne

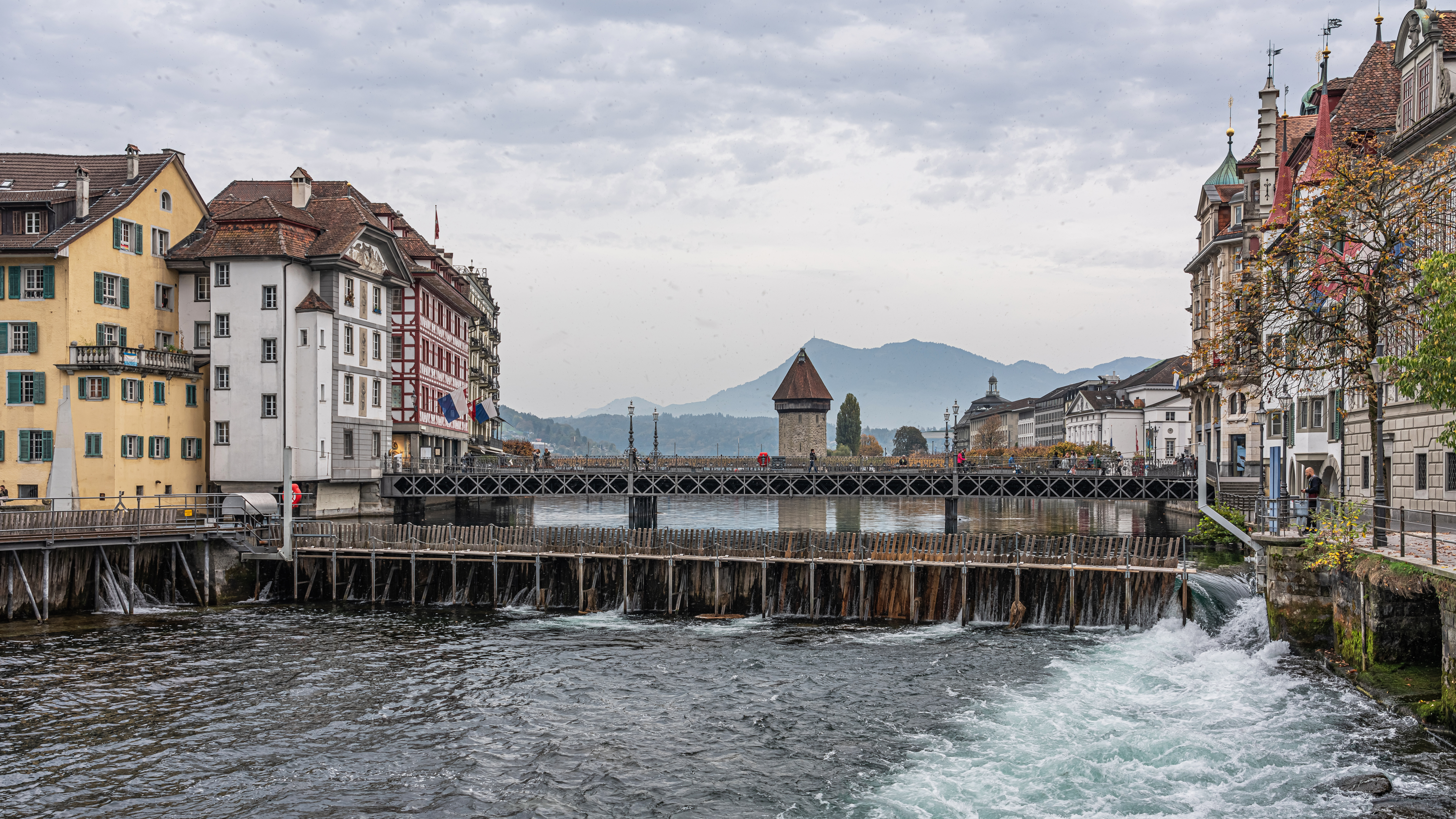
Needle dam regulating Lake Lucerne at Lucerne

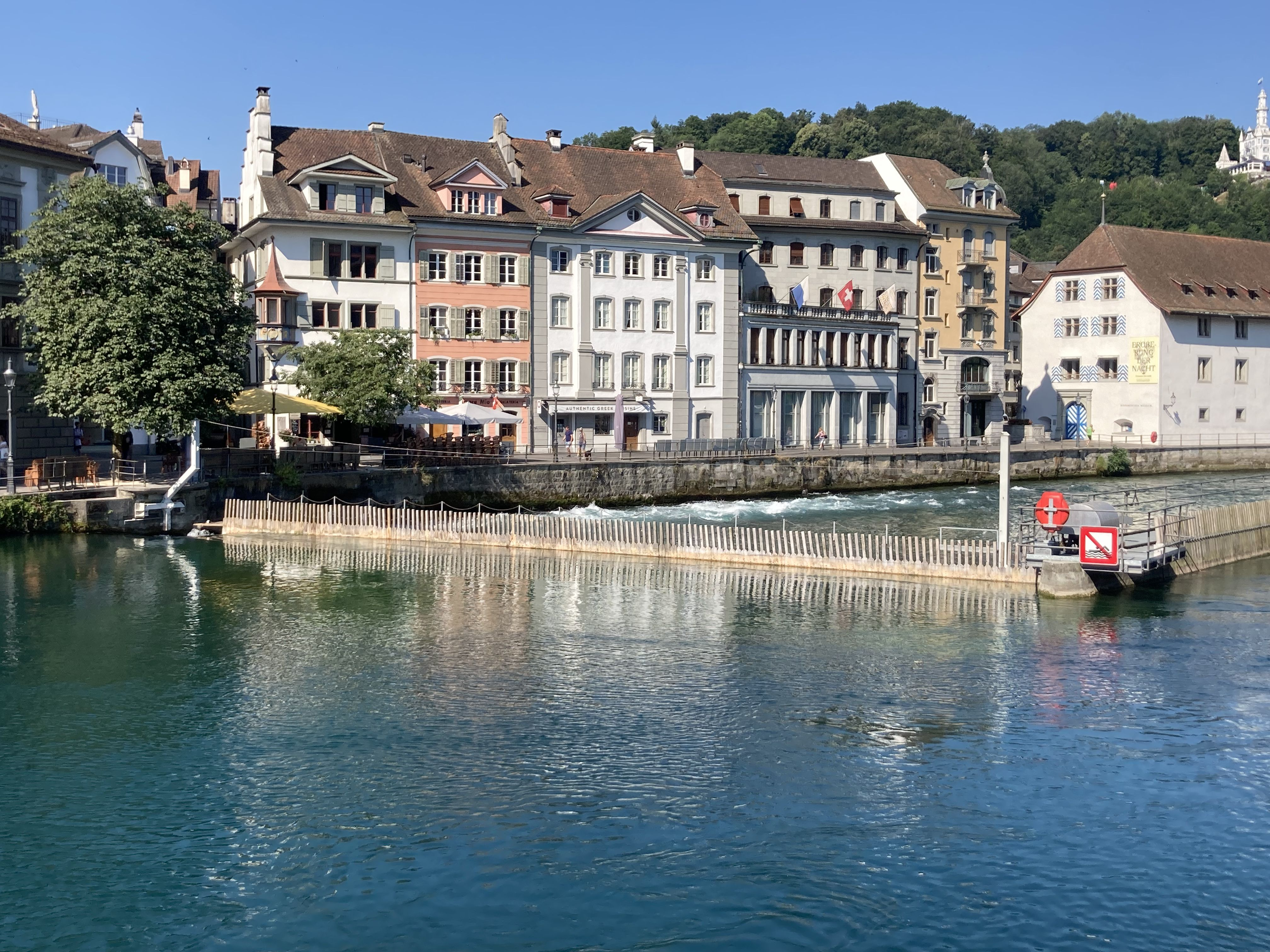
Reverse of the Needle dam in Lucerne

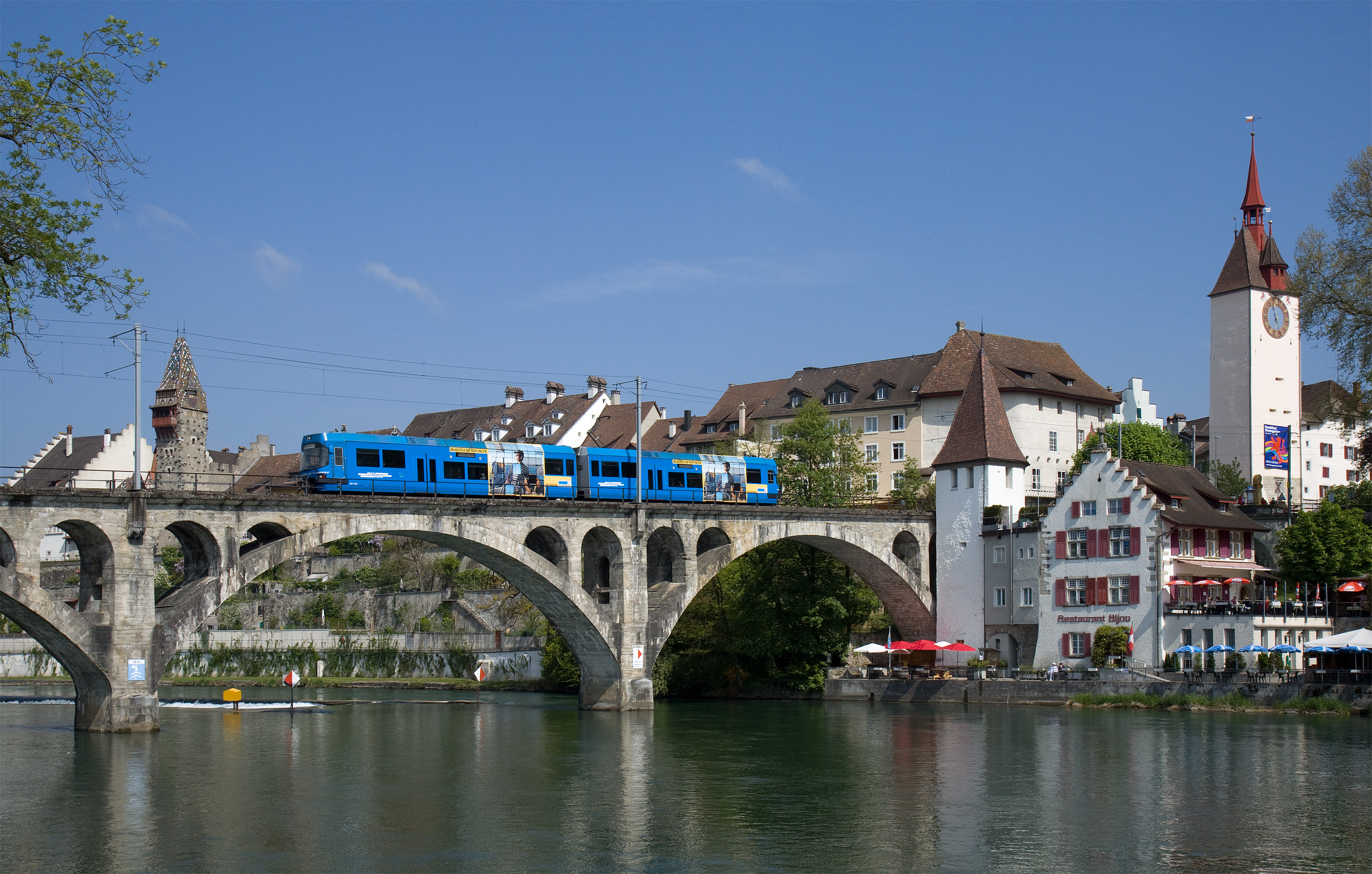
Bridge of the Bremgarten-Dietikon-Bahn near Bremgarten

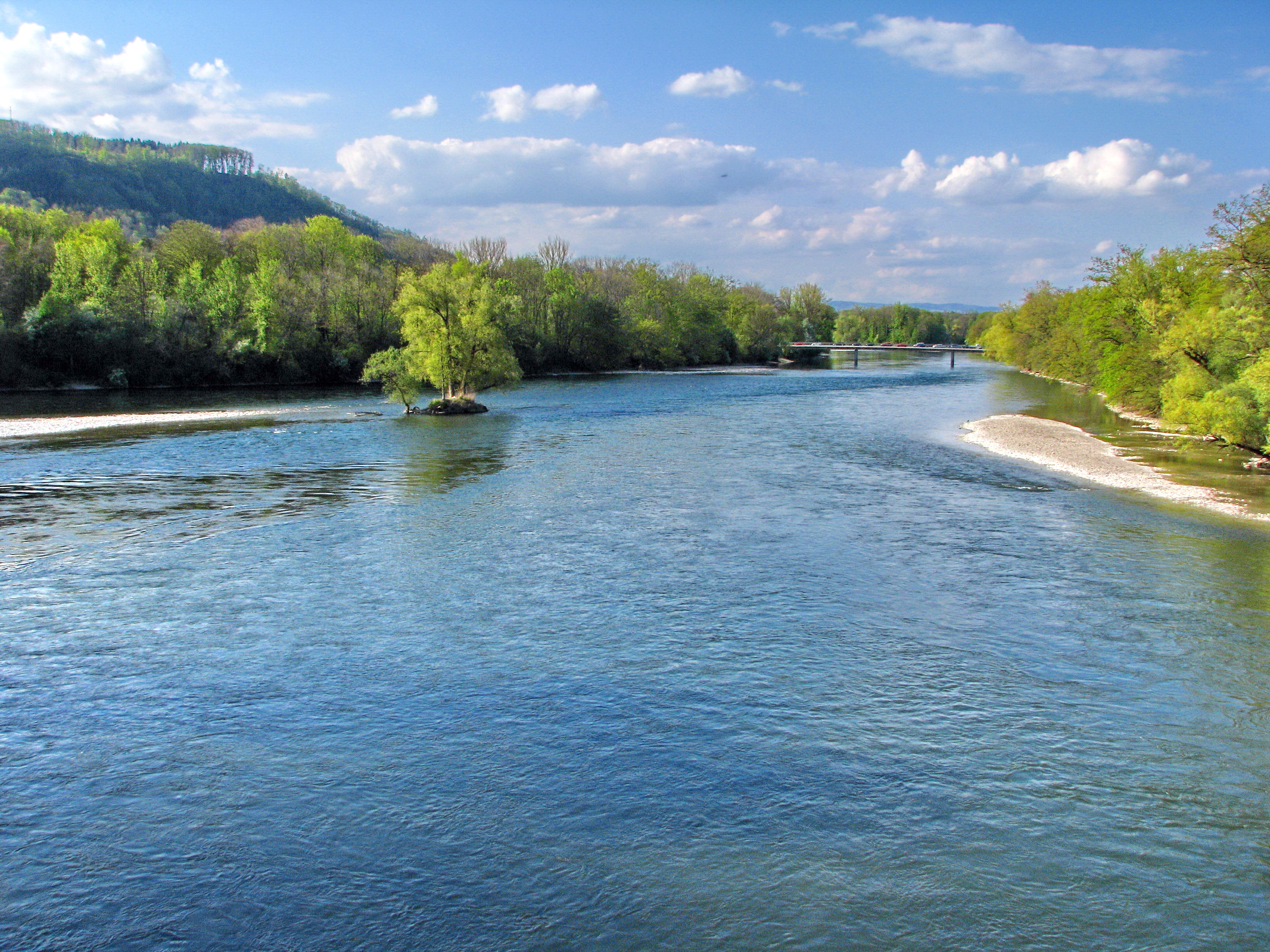
Confluence with the Aare at the "Wasserschloss"

The Gotthardreuss rises in the Gotthard massif, emerging from Lago di Lucendro (reservoir built in 1947; elevation 2,131 m) in the canton of Ticino and passing into the canton of Uri below the Brigghubel (1,898 m).

The Furkareuss rises east of Furka Pass (2,429 m), early joined by the Blaubergbach (sourced by two mountain lakes on 2,649 m) and several other creeks sourced by still existing glaciers, such as Sidelengletscher (3,170 m), Tiefengletscher (3,285 m) in the north, and Muttengletscher (2,908 m) and Witenwassergletscher (2,805 m) in the south, and eventually forms the east–west valley called Urseren, passing Realp at halfway through the valley at 1,540 m in eastern direction until its eastern end at Andermatt. This source is only around 5 km away from, and on the same mountain massif as the source of the Rhône, but will ultimately lead to the opposite side of the continent.

Gotthardreuss and Furkareuss join at Hospental (1,446 m). Downstream of Andermatt the Reuss joins at 1,429 m the village creek Unteralpreuss, finally turns to the north, and passes through the 3 km-long narrow and deep Schöllenen Gorge and under the legendary Devil's Bridge (1,120 m).

At Göschenen (1,057 m) it is joined by the Göschenerreuss, sourced by the glaciers Dammagletscher (3,430 m) and Flachensteinfirn (3,150 m) besides several others. From here it forms the main valley of the canton of Uri, the Urner Reusstal, passing below Wassen (840 m), Gurtnellen (720 m), Amsteg and Silenen (500 m), and through Erstfeld (460 m), past Attinghausen and Altdorf (440 m), joining the southernmost part of Lake Lucerne (the Urnersee) between Flüelen and Seedorf (434 m). The Reuss leaves Lake Lucerne some 30 km to the north-west, at the city of Lucerne.

Notable bridges in Lucerne are the Kapellbrücke, first built 1333, rebuilt 1993 and Spreuerbrücke, built 1408. A needle dam just upstream from the Spreuerbrücke) maintains the water level.

It receives the Kleine Emme from Entlebuch at Emmen (432 m). From here, it flows north-east through Buchrain, Root, Gisikon and Honau, and downstream of Honau (402 m) leaves the canton of Lucerne, now forming the border between Aargau and Zug, passing Dietwil (Aargau), Risch-Rotkreuz (Zug), Oberrüti (Aargau) and Sins (Aargau), Hünenberg (Zug) and Mühlau (Aargau). It receives the Lorze from Lake Zug downstream of Maschwanden.

Downstream of this confluence, the Reuss forms the border between Aargau and Zürich, passing Merenschwand (Aargau, 389 m) and Ottenbach (Zurich, 384 m), and enters Aargau downstream of Ottenbach.

Within Aargau, the Reuss flows past Aristau, Jonen, Rottenschwil, Unterlunkhofen, Hermetschwil-Staffeln, here forming Flachsee (380 m), and onward to Zufikon, Bremgarten (370 m). The Reussbrücke at Bremgarten was first built c. 1270, first mentioned 1281 (wooden bridge rebuilt 1953–1957).

From Bremgarten, the Reuss meanders between the villages of Eggenwil, Fischbach-Göslikon, Künten, Niederwil, to Stetten (352 m), flowing past Tägerig, Mellingen (350 m), Birrhard (340 m), Mülligen, Birmenstorf and between Windisch and Gebenstorf, finally joining the Aare just downstream of Brugg, at 327 m.

After the confluence the river continues as the Aare, which flows into the Rhine at Koblenz.

=== Catchment area ===
The catchment area of 3,426 km^{2} (1,323 sq mi) approximately covers Central Switzerland.

The catchment area of the upper Reuss includes almost the entire canton of Uri (with the exception of the Urner Boden, and in the uppermost part of the Gotthardreuss a portion of Ticino (Airolo municipality). The highest point of the drainage basin is the summit of Dammastock, at elevation 3,630 m.

The basin of the lower Reuss adds the catchment areas of other tributaries of Lake Lucerne as well as that of the Kleine Emme, including most of Nidwalden and Obwalden, and parts of Schwyz, Lucerne and Zug. Downstream of Lucerne, further tributaries add other parts of Zug as well as parts of Zürich and Aargau.

=== Tributaries ===
Reuss and its tributaries, with length and catchment area, from mouth to source (incomplete):

Reuss - 164 km - 3,426 km^{2} (at Gebenstorf into Aare)

Mülibach - 8 km^{2} (at Mellingen)
Jonen - 46 km^{2} (18 sq mi)
Lorze - 390 km^{2} (150 sq mi) (at Reussspitz, Hünenberg)

Haselbach
Rigi-Aa - 18.6 km^{2} (7.2 sq mi) (at Arth into Lake Zug)
Hüribach - 12.8 km^{2} (4.9 sq mi) (into Ägerisee)

Sinserbach - 16 km^{2} (6.2 sq mi) (at Sins)
Ron - 22.5 km^{2} (8.7 sq mi) (at Gisikon)
Kleine Emme - 58 km - 477 km^{2} (184 sq mi) (at Emmenbrücke)

Ränggbach
Rümlig
Wigger
Fontannen
Entlen

Grosse Entlen - 16 km

Eibach
Rotbach

Kleine Entlen

Headwaters

Wiss Emme
Waldemme

Lake Lucerne - 113.6 km^{2} (43.9 sq mi) - 2,238 km^{2} (at Lucerne, outflow Reuss)

Würzenbach - 7.7 km - 39 km^{2} (15 sq mi) (at Lucerne)
Sarner Aa/Dreiwässerkanal/Aa/Lauibach - 28 km - 267 km^{2} (103 sq mi) (at Alpnachstad)

Grosse Schliere - 17 km - 28.8 km^{2} (11.1 sq mi) (above Wichelsee)
Grosse Melchaa

Melbach - 18 km^{2} (6.9 sq mi) (at Ennetmoos)
Engelberger Aa - 50 km - 230 km^{2} (89 sq mi) (at Buochs)
Muota - 316 km^{2} (122 sq mi) (at Brunnen)
Isitalerbach - 60 km^{2} (23 sq mi) (near Isleten)
Altdorfer Dorfbach (at Altdorf)

Upper Reuss - 832 km^{2} (321 sq mi) (at Flüelen/Seedorf into Lake Lucerne)

Schächen - 109 km^{2} (42 sq mi) (at Attinghausen)
Alpbach - 32 km^{2} (12 sq mi) (at Erstfeld)
Kärstelenbach - 116 km^{2} (45 sq mi)
Meienreuss - 71 km^{2} (27 sq mi)
Göschenenalpreuss - 92 km^{2} (36 sq mi) (at Göschenen)

Voralpreuss

Unteralpreuss (at Andermatt)

Oberalpreuss (above Andermatt)

Headwaters at Hospental:

Furkareuss - 12 km

Witenwasserenreuss

Muttenreuss

Tiefenbach
Sidelenbach

Gotthardreuss

== History ==
=== Name ===
Ptolemy records the river's pre-Germanic name as Silana (whence the name of Silenen). The Germanic name is attested as Rusa, Rusia from the 9th century (sometimes recorded as Ursa in the Early Modern period, cf. Urseren), from an early Germanic *Rūsi, oblique *Rūsjō-.

Greule (1982) interprets the name as an Old European hydronym, directly cognate with Riß. Because of Ptolemy's record of the pre-Germanic name Silana, it is possible that only part of the river was known as *Rūsi in antiquity; alternatively, *Rūsi has been interpreted as a purely Germanic name introduced with Germanic settlement in the early medieval period, a derivation from OHG rūsa, riusa "fish trap".

=== Upper Reuss ===
Until the 13th century, the Schöllenen Gorge was impassable, separating Urseren from Uri. Urseren was accessible via Furka and Oberalp, and was under the influence of the bishopric of Chur.

The main settlement area of Uri was the plain of the Reuss estuary Altdorf (Reussebene). Settlements tended to form on either side of the river, while the river itself was often taken as communal or parish boundary.

The Schöllenen Gorge was made passable the 1230s, opening access to the Gotthard Pass. This resulted in an immense increase of the strategic value of the Reuss valley, as reflected in the grant of imperial immediacy to Uri and the wider political backdrop of the foundation of the Old Swiss Confederacy.

The Reuss was canalised between Attinghausen and Altdorf in 1850–1863, and to the river mouth in 1900–1912, significantly increasing the arable land in the Reuss plain. A small river delta was reconstructed in 1985. After flooding in 1987, improved flood control measures were constructed during 1995–1999.

A small hydroelectric plant was built in Schöllenen Gorge for the construction of the Gotthard Tunnel in 1875. Larger hydroelectric plants were built at Amsteg (1922), Wassen (1949) and Göschenen (1962).

=== Lower Reuss ===
The lower Reuss flows along a series of former glacial lakes. Settlements along the river were built on lateral moraines, while the river bed itself was marshy and subject to flooding, and thus unsuitable for settlement. The oldest river crossings are along terminal moraines between the former glacial lakes.

The Reuss valley was under Habsburg Austrian rule during the 14th century.

In the 15th century, the Reuss became the border between territories of the Swiss Confederacy, in 1429 between Lucerne and Zürich, and later between Zug, Zürich and the Freie Ämter condominium, between Freie Ämter and Baden, and between Baden and Berne. The Reuss downstream of Ottenbach came to lie within Aargau with the creation of this canton in 1803.

The Reuss had the status of "imperial road" (freie Reichsstrasse) in the late medieval period. Until 1798, it was the responsibility of cantonal authorities (the Reussherren of Lucerne and Zug) to keep the river navigable. The river was important as waterway for traffic between Lucerne and Zurzach, and via Aare and Rhine to Basel, until the construction of transit roads in the 18th century. River crossings by ferry in the medieval period were at Lunkhofen (mentioned 1160), Windisch, Sins, Mühlau, Oberrüti, and Dietwil. The crossing at Lunkhofen was on the main route from Zürich to Berne. Bridges across the Reuss were in Lucerne, Bremgarten (1230), Mellingen (mentioned 1253) and Gisikon (1432). In 1528, the Catholic cantons blocked the trade routes across the Reuss for Protestant cantons and trade between Zürich and Berne was re-routed through Windisch.

Because ferries and bridges were a source of income, the construction of new crossings was opposed during the early modern period, and only one new bridge was built, commissioned by Zug, at Sins (1640). New bridges were built only after the collapse of the Old Swiss Confederacy, e.g. at Windisch (1799), Ottenbach (1864) and Mühlau (1940).

By the end of the 20th century, there were more than a dozen crossings of the lower Reuss, including a number of railway and motorway bridges.

Projects for canalisation in 1648 (Hans Conrad Gyger) and 1809 (Johann Gottfried Tulla) were not realised.

In 1840, Aargau constructed some canalisation, with limited impact. A large-scale project of river engineering was completed during 1971–1985 (Reusstalsanierung). The hydroelectric plant at Bremgarten-Zufikon was built in 1893 and enlarged in 1975 (Flachsee reservoir).

== See also ==
- Rivers in Switzerland
