= Lake Zug =

Lake in Switzerland

- Zugersee (German)
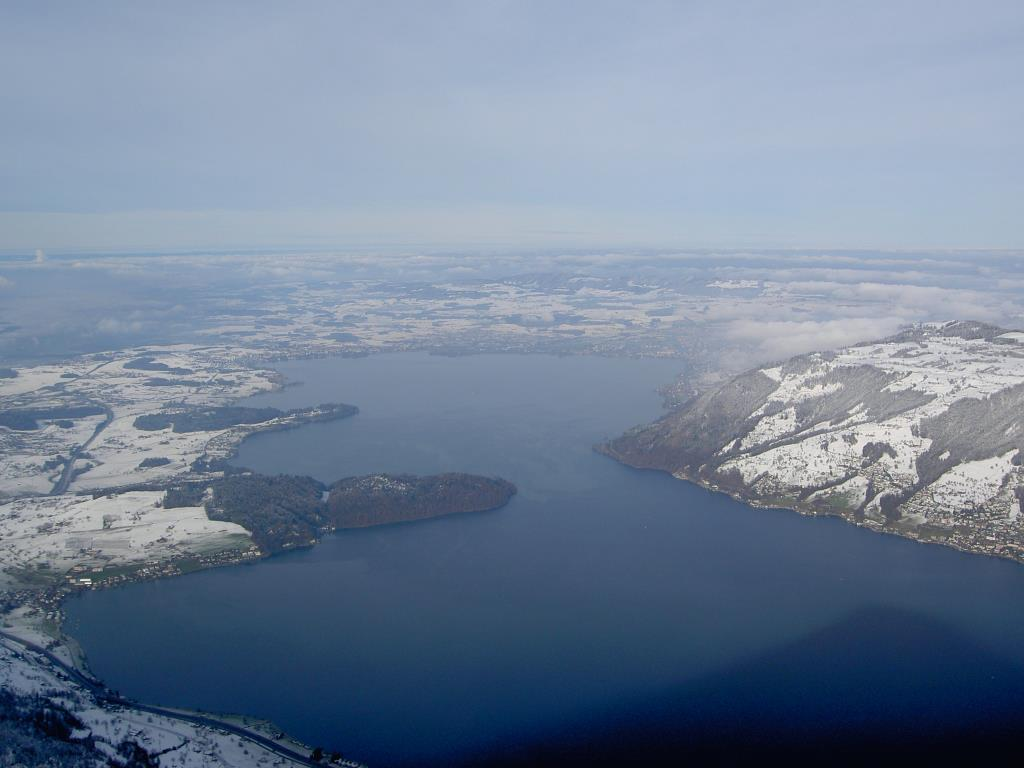

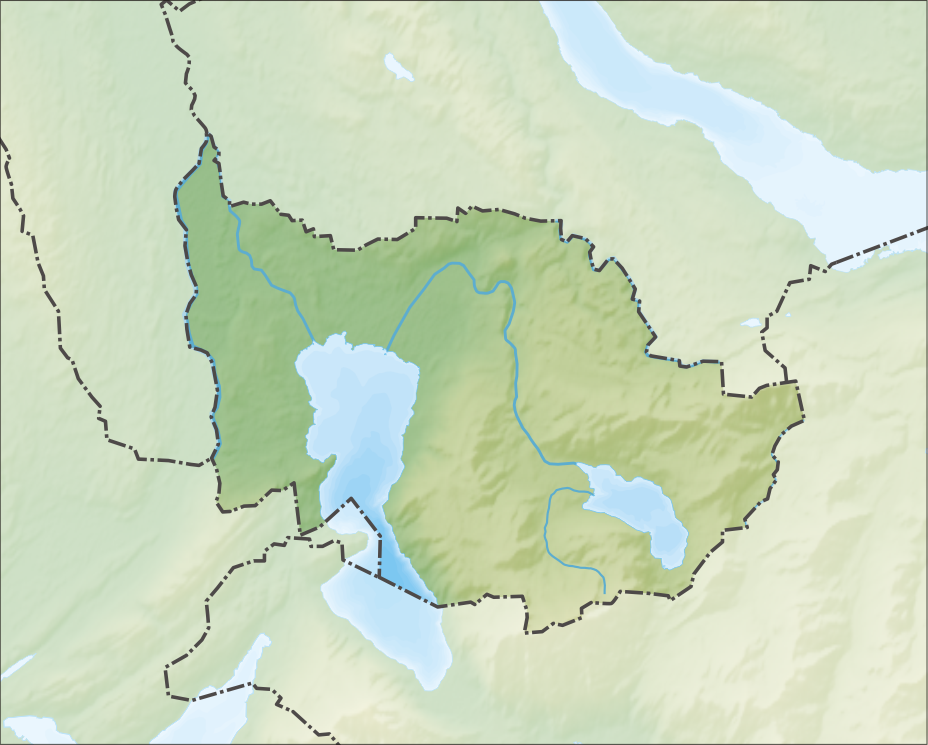
- Location within Canton of Zug Location within Canton of Lucerne Location within Canton of Schwyz Location within Switzerland Location within Alps
- Interactive map of Lake Zug
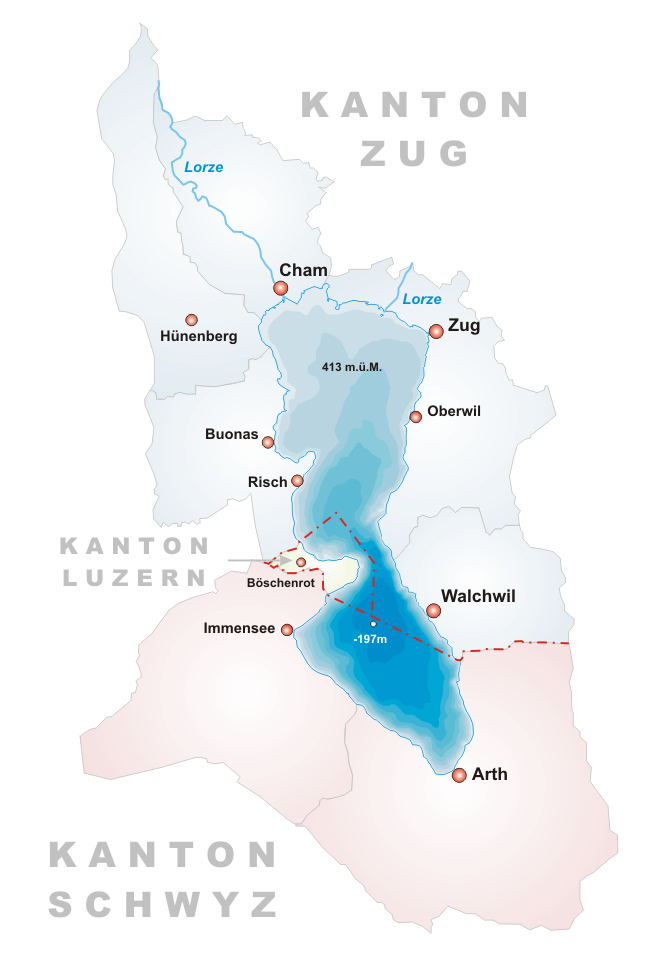
- Map
- Location: Central Switzerland
- Coordinates: 47°7′N 8°29′E
- Primary inflows: Lorze
- Primary outflows: Lorze
- Catchment area: 204 km^{2} (79 sq mi)
- Basin countries: Switzerland
- Max. length: 13.8 km (8.6 mi)
- Max. width: 4.7 km (2.9 mi)
- Surface area: 38.3 km^{2} (14.8 sq mi)
- Average depth: 83.2 m (273 ft)
- Max. depth: 197 m (646 ft)
- Water volume: 3.2 km^{3} (0.77 cu mi)
- Residence time: 14.7 years
- Surface elevation: 413 m (1,355 ft)
- Sections/sub-basins: Obersee, Untersee
- Settlements: Zug, Arth, Buonas, Cham, Immensee, Oberwil, Risch, Walchwil, Meierskappel

Lake Zug (German: Zugersee, Swiss Standard German pronunciation: [ˈtsuːɡərˌzeː]) is a lake in Central Switzerland, situated between Lake Lucerne and Lake Zurich. It stretches for 14 km (8.7 mi) between Arth and the Cham-Zug bay. The Lorze as the main feeder river empties its waters into the lake at its northern extremity, but 1 km (0.6 mi) further west issues from the lake to pursue its course towards the Reuss. Due to this poor feeding, Environmental protection is very important as the lake would suffer long term damage if polluted as the second of the rivers, Rigiaa, feeds only a marginal amount into the lake at its southern end. Already a great part of the fauna in the deep parts of the lake has been lost.

== Background ==
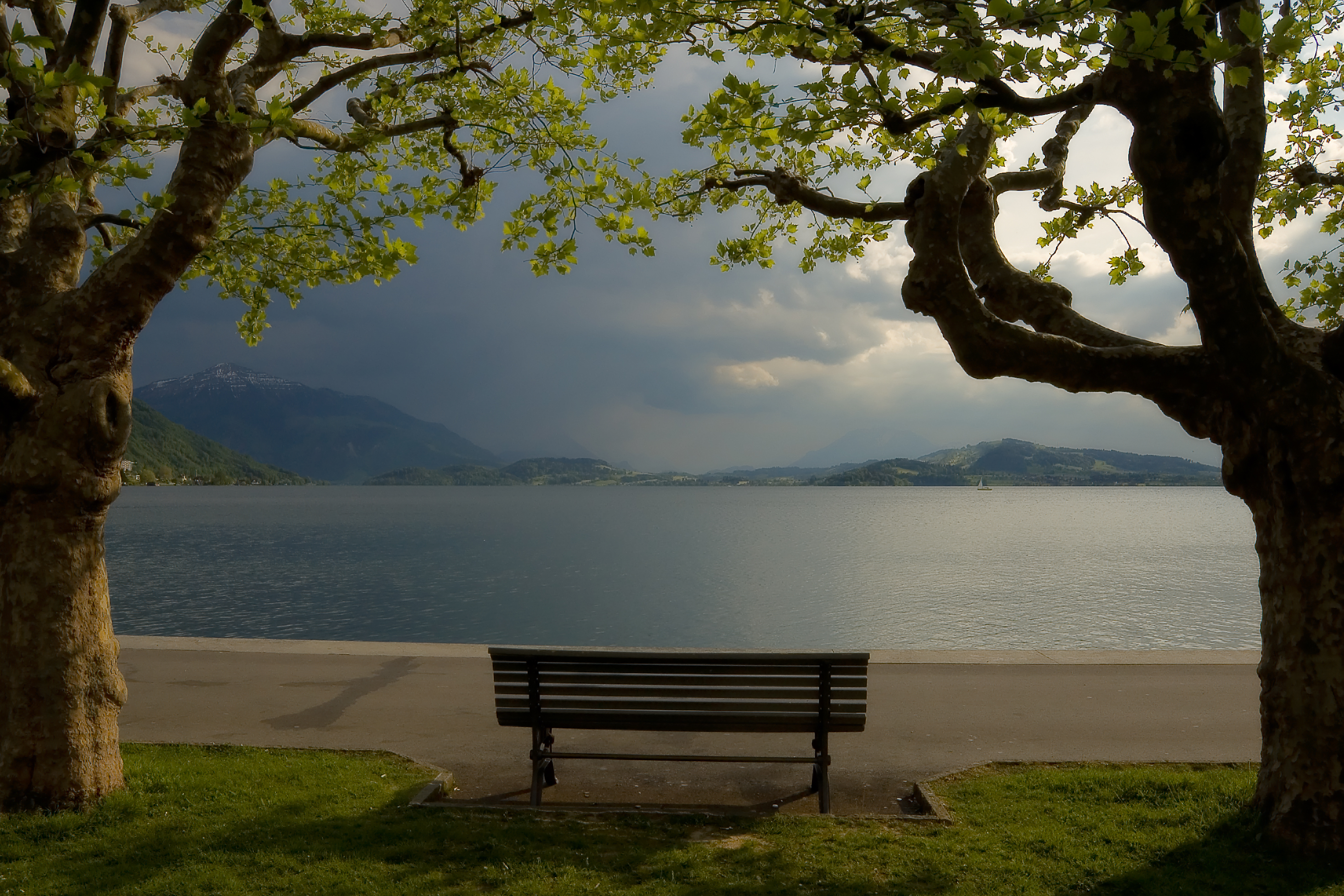
Lake Zug with view of Rigi

The lake is mostly within the borders of the Canton of Zug, with about 10 square kilometres (3.9 sq mi) at its southern end in the canton Schwyz, while the Canton of Lucerne claims about 2 km^{2} (0.77 sq mi) to the north of Immensee. Toward the south-west extremity of the lake the Rigi descends rather steeply to the water's edge, while part of its east shore forms a narrow level band at the foot of the 1,583 m (5,194 ft) Rossberg, and the Zugerberg. The culminating point of the lake's drainage basin is the summit of the Rigi at 1,798 m (5,899 ft).

At its northern end, the shores are nearly level, while on the west shore the wooded promontory of Buonas (with its castles, old and new) projects picturesquely into the waters. The principal place on the lake is the town of Zug. Three railways follow the shore of the lake, one from Zürich via Zug and Arth-Goldau to Saint-Gotthard, one from Lucerne via Arth-Goldau to Saint-Gotthard, and the third from Zürich via Zug to Lucerne.

Many fish (including pike and carp of considerable weights) are taken in the lake, which is especially famous for an endemic kind of trout (Salmo salvelinus, locally called Rolheli).

== History ==
The first steamer was placed on the lake in 1852.

In the early 20th century, a railway (formerly part of the St. Gotthard main route) ran along its eastern shore past Walchwil to Arth at its south end, which was connected initially by a steam tramway with the Arth-Goldau station of the St. Gotthard line. This line runs from Arth along the western shore to Immensee, where it bears south-west to Lucerne, while from Immensee another railway leads (at first some way from the shore) to Cham, 5 kilometres (3 mi) west of Zug.

== Settlements ==
- Arth
  - Gängigen
- Buonas
- Cham
- Chämleten
- Immensee
- Risch
- Walchwil
- Zug
  - Lorzen
  - Oberwil

== Public Transportation ==
Public transportation on Lake Zug is done by the Zugersee Schifffahrt / Schifffahrtsgesellschaft für den Zugersee AG (SGZ) .

Präfix	Name	Year / Origin / Warft	Length / wide / deep / max. Pax.	Note:	Picture
MS	Zug	2003 / Linz / Österreichische Schiffswerften AG	45,60 m / 9,20 m / 1,20 m / 450	in use	
MS	Schwyz	1997 / Kressbronn / Bodan-Werft	31,20 m / 7,00 m / 1,00 m / 150	in use	
MS	Rigi	1992 / Kressbronn / Bodan Werft	46,50 m / 9,50 m / 1,60 m / 450	in use	
MS	Schwan	1923 / Lauenburg an der Elbe / Hitzler Werft	17,23 m / 3,67 m / 0,40 m	ex. Morgarten (1923-1949); ex. Harder (1949-2001); in use	
