= Spreuer Bridge =

Swiss bridge

Spreuerbrücke
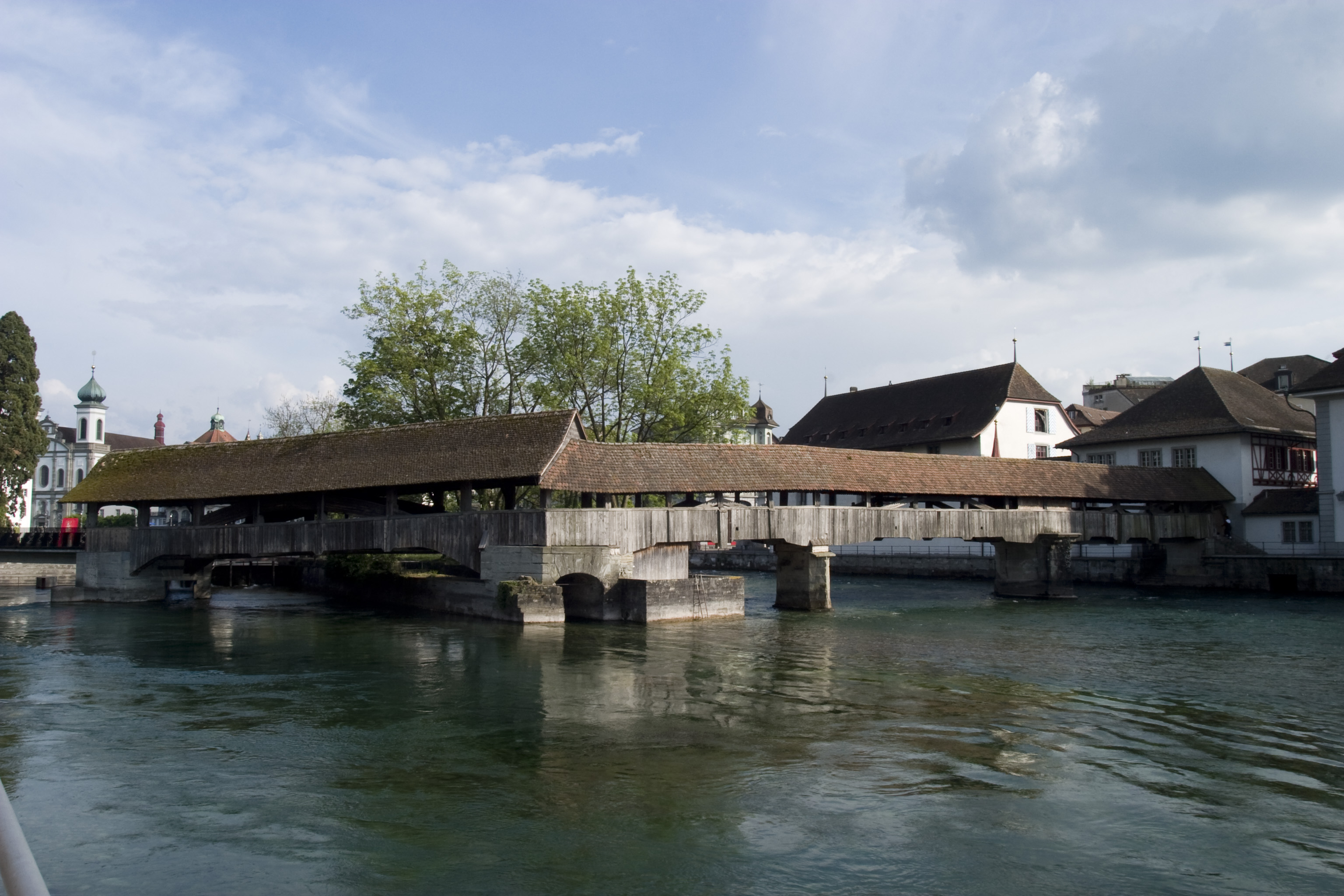
- The Spreuer Bridge in Lucerne
- Coordinates: 47°03′07.1″N 8°18′06.5″E
- Carried: Pedestrian
- Crossed: Reuss
- Locale: Lucerne, Switzerland
- Began: Mühlenplatz, Altstadt
- Ended: Pfistergasse
- Other name(s): Mühlenbrücke
- Named for: Named after chaff (Spreu) dumped from the bridge
- Owner: City of Lucerne
- Heritage status: Cultural Property of National Significance
- Website: kapellbruecke.com/spreuerbridge/
- Preceded by: Reussbrücke
- Followed by: Geissmattbrücke

Characteristics
- Design: Covered wooden bridge
- Material: Wood
- Trough construction: Wood
- Pier construction: Stone
- Total length: 81 m (266 ft)
- Traversable?: Yes
- Longest span: 11.40 m (37.4 ft), 29.90 m (98.1 ft), 16.30 m (53.5 ft), 25.80 m (84.6 ft)
- No. of spans: 5
- Piers in water: 4

History
- Built: c. 1408
- Rebuilt: after 1566
- Destroyed: 1566 (partly by tempest), 1871/1875 (mills burnt down)
- Replaced: Mühlensteg

Statistics
- Daily traffic: 8400 (2017)

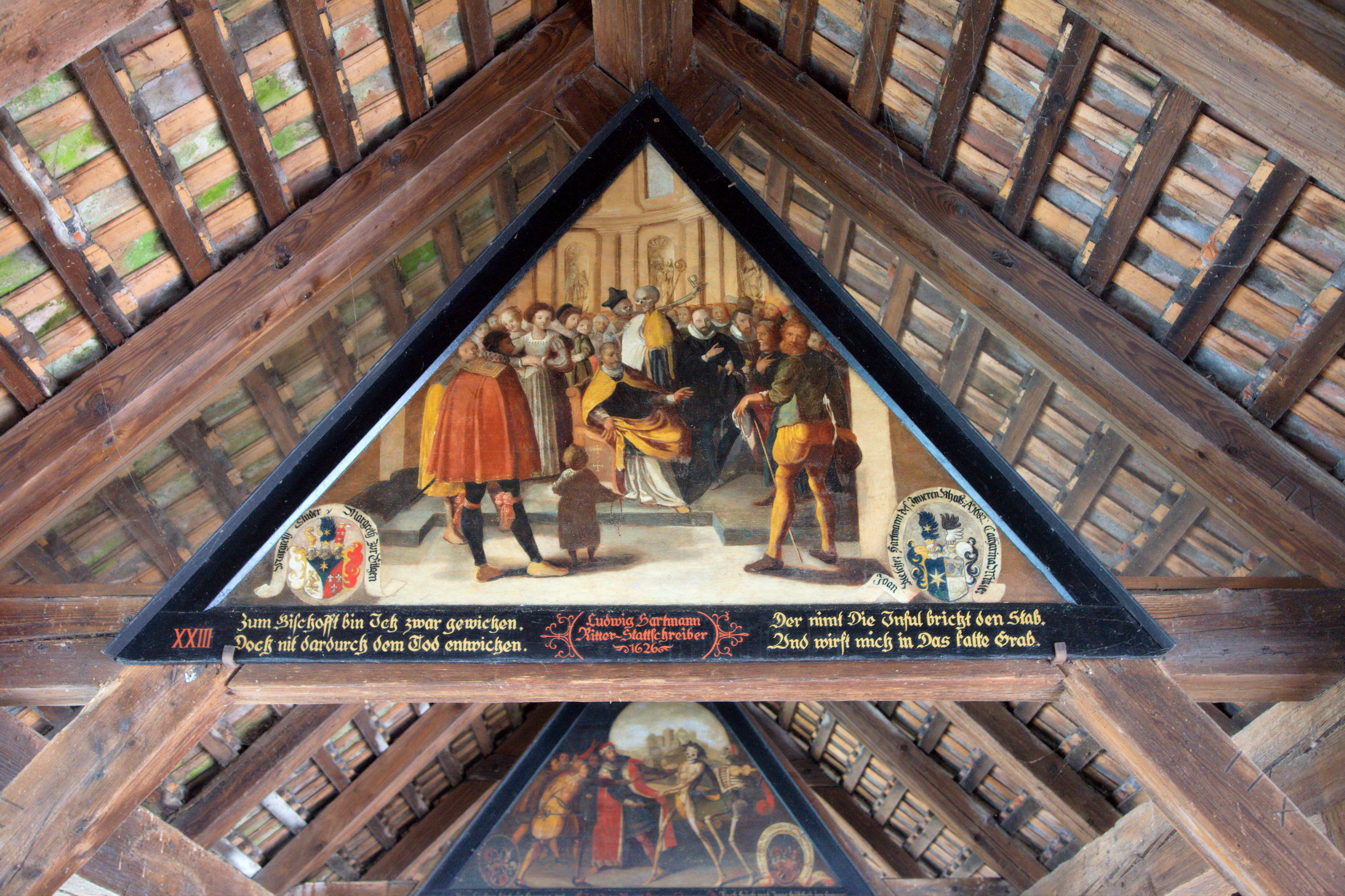
One of the Danse Macabre paintings.

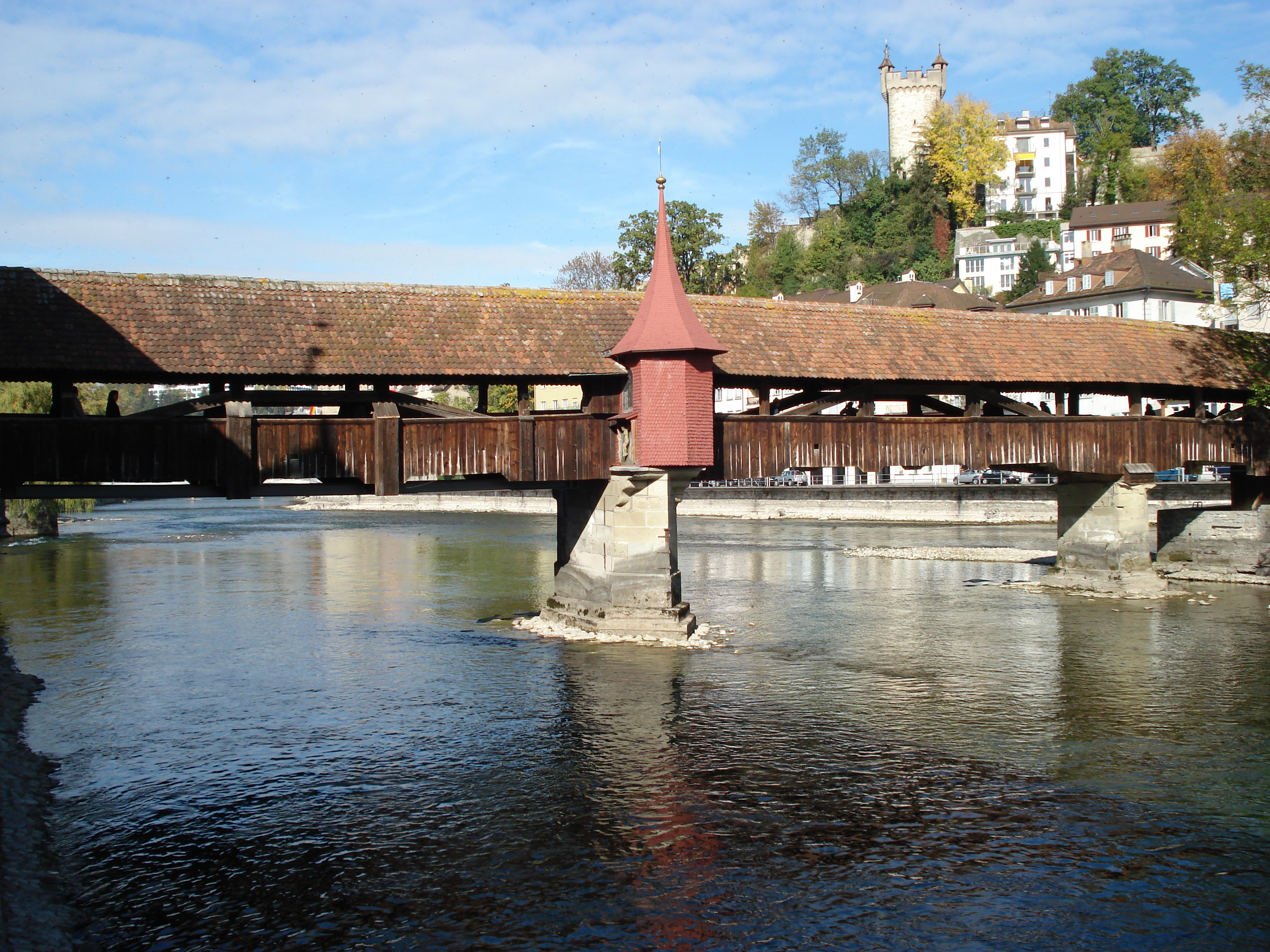
Partial view of the bridge.

The Spreuer Bridge (German: Spreuerbrücke, formerly also Mühlenbrücke) is one of two extant covered wooden footbridges in the city of Lucerne, Switzerland. Besides the other preserved bridge, the Kapellbrücke, a third bridge of this type – the Hofbrücke – existed in Lucerne, but was demolished in the 19th century.

== History ==
The first bridge was constructed in the 13th century to connect the Mühlenplatz (Mill Place) on the right bank of the Reuss with the mills in the middle of the river. The extension of the bridge to the left bank was completed only in c. 1408. This was the only bridge in Lucerne where it was allowed to dump chaff (in German: Spreu, therefore the name Spreuerbrücke) and leaves into the river, as it was the bridge farthest downriver. The bridge was destroyed by a flood in 1566 and then rebuilt, together with a granary as the bridge head, called the Herrenkeller.

== Totentanz ==
The pediments of the Spreuer Bridge contain paintings in the interior triangular frames, which is a feature unique to the wooden bridges of Lucerne. In the case of the Spreuer Bridge, the paintings form a Danse Macabre, known as Totentanz in German, which was created from 1616 to 1637 under the direction of painter Kaspar Meglinger. It is the largest known example of a Totentanz cycle. Of the 67 original paintings, 45 are still in existence. Most of the paintings contain the coat of arms of the donor in the lower left corner and to the right the coat of arms of the donor's wife. The black wooden frames bear explanations in verse and the names of the donors. The paintings also contain portraits of the donors and other exponents of Lucerne society. The painters of Lucerne knew the woodcuts by Hans Holbein the Younger but were more advanced in their painting technique. The images and texts of the Lucerne Danse Macabre are intended to highlight that there's no place in the city, in the country or at sea where death isn't present.
