= Needle dam =

Manually adjustable weir

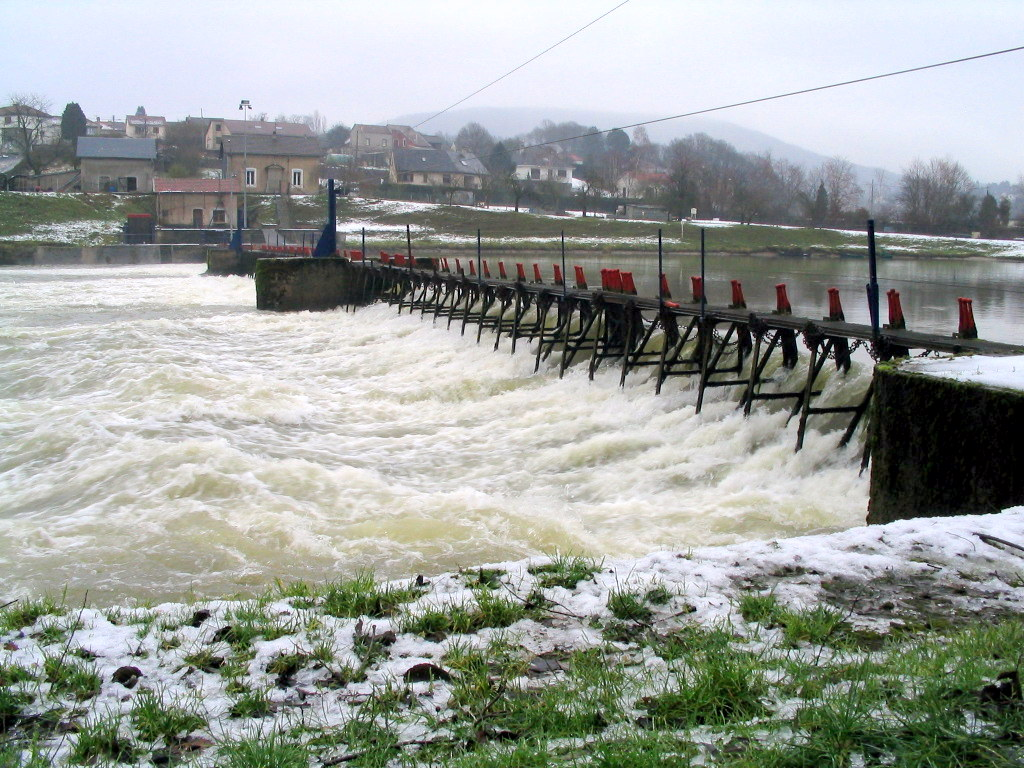
A manually operated needle dam-type weir near Revin on the Meuse, France

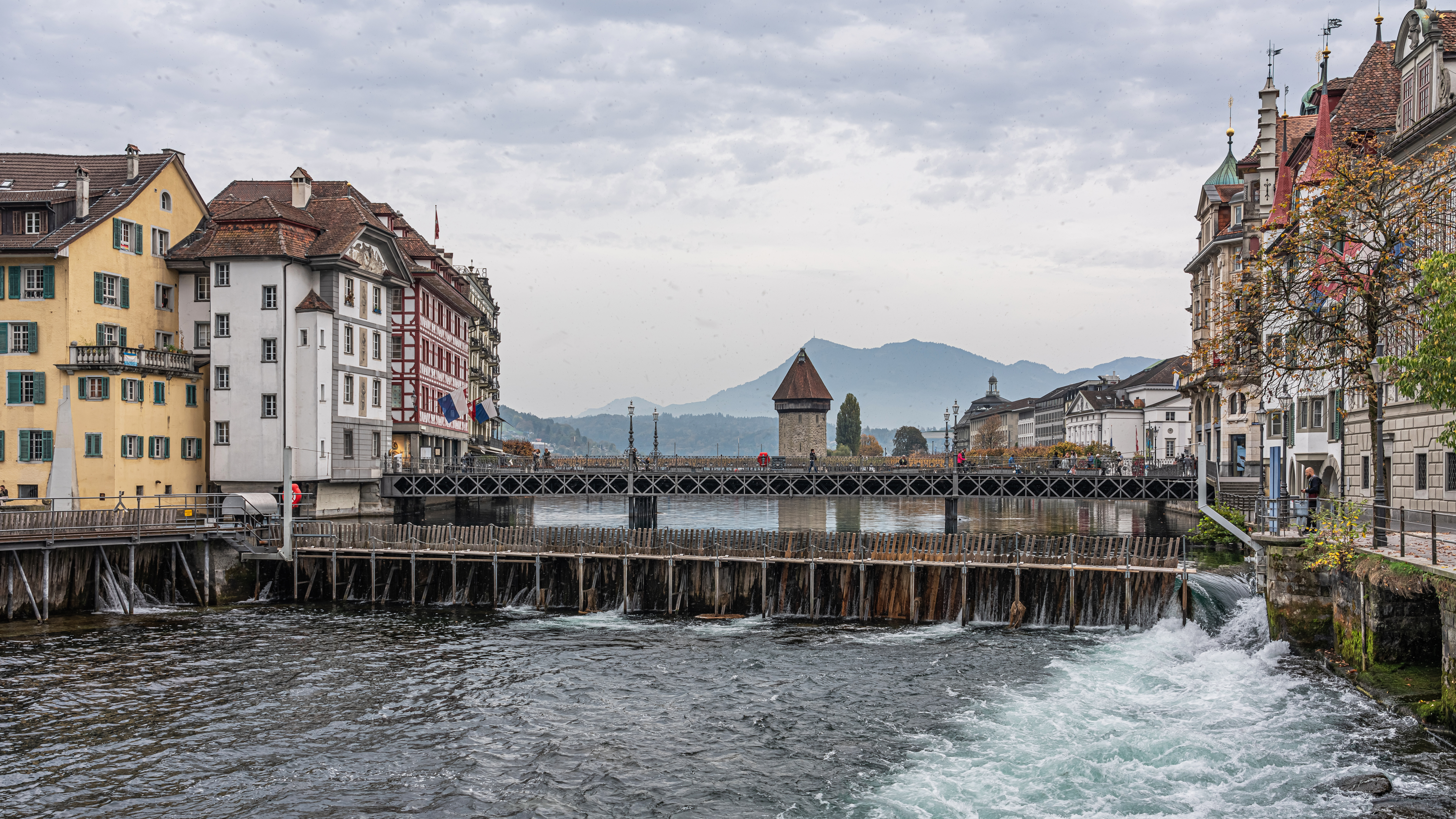
Needle dam in the Reuss in Lucerne, Switzerland

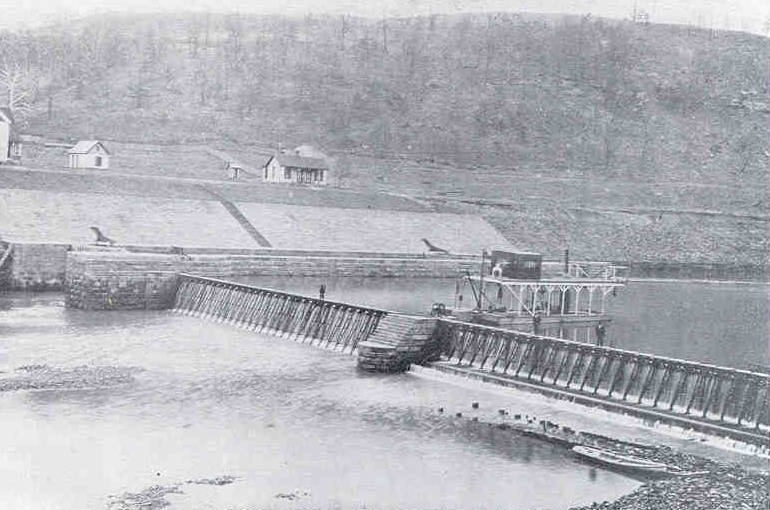
This Needle dam was built on the Big Sandy River, in the city of Louisa, KY, in the United States

A needle dam is a weir designed to maintain the level or flow of a river through the use of thin "needles" of wood. The needles are leaned against a solid frame and are not intended to be water-tight. Individual needles can be added or removed by hand to constrict the flow of the river, forming a sluice.

One early needle dam maintains the level of Lake Lucerne in Lucerne, Switzerland by restricting the flow of the Reuss, several are still in operation on the Meuse, France and others were built in the United States in the 19th century.

The first needle dam in the United States was completed in 1896 on the Big Sandy River, downstream from the city of Louisa, Kentucky.

A similar approach, now known as paddle and rymer weirs, was used since medieval times on the River Thames in England to create flash locks.
