= Flachsee =

Lake on the Reuss at Rottenschwil, Switzerland

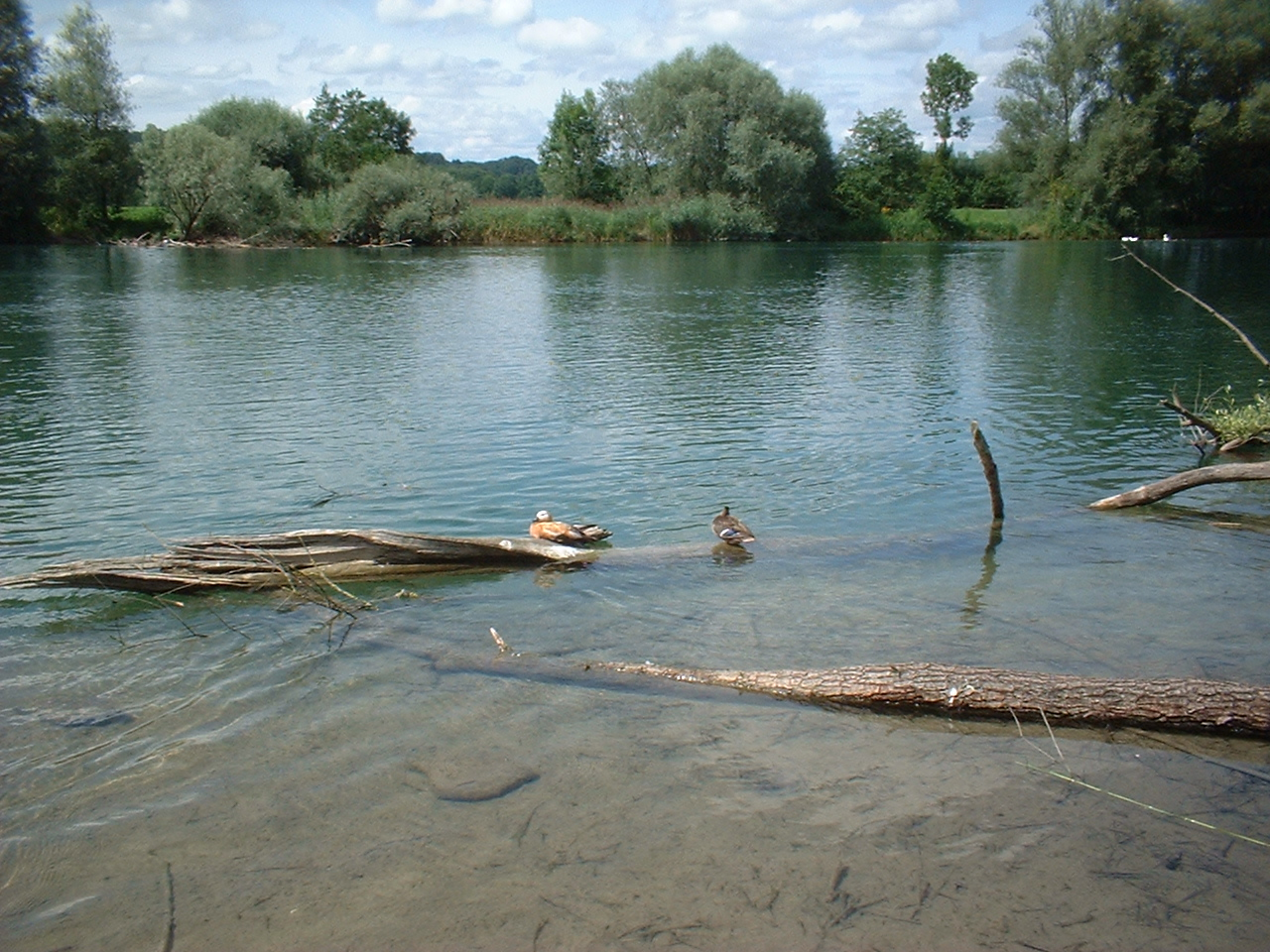

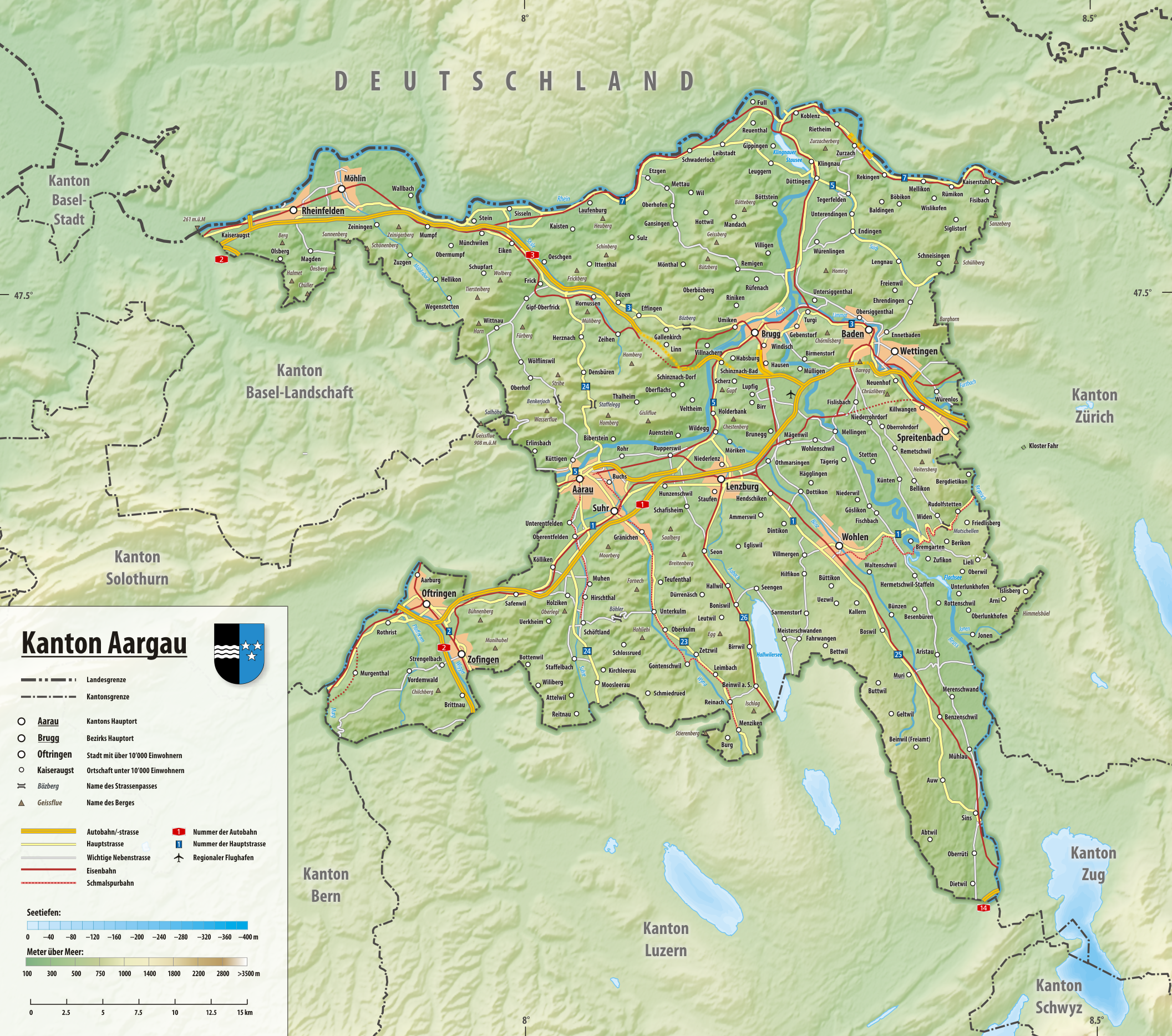
- Location within Canton of Aargau Location within Switzerland Location within Alps
- Interactive map of Flachsee
- Location: Aargau
- Coordinates: 47°19′41″N 8°22′10″E
- Type: reservoir
- Primary inflows: Reuss
- Primary outflows: Reuss
- Basin countries: Switzerland
- Surface area: 72 ha (180 acres)
- Max. depth: 7 m (23 ft)
- Surface elevation: 378 m (1,240 ft)

Flachsee is an artificial lake on the Reuss at Rottenschwil, south of Bremgarten in the Aargau region of Switzerland. The reservoir was formed after the construction of the dam in 1975 at Bremgarten-Zufikon. The lake's surface area is 72 ha (180 acres).

== See also ==
- List of lakes of Switzerland
