= Lorze =

River in Switzerland

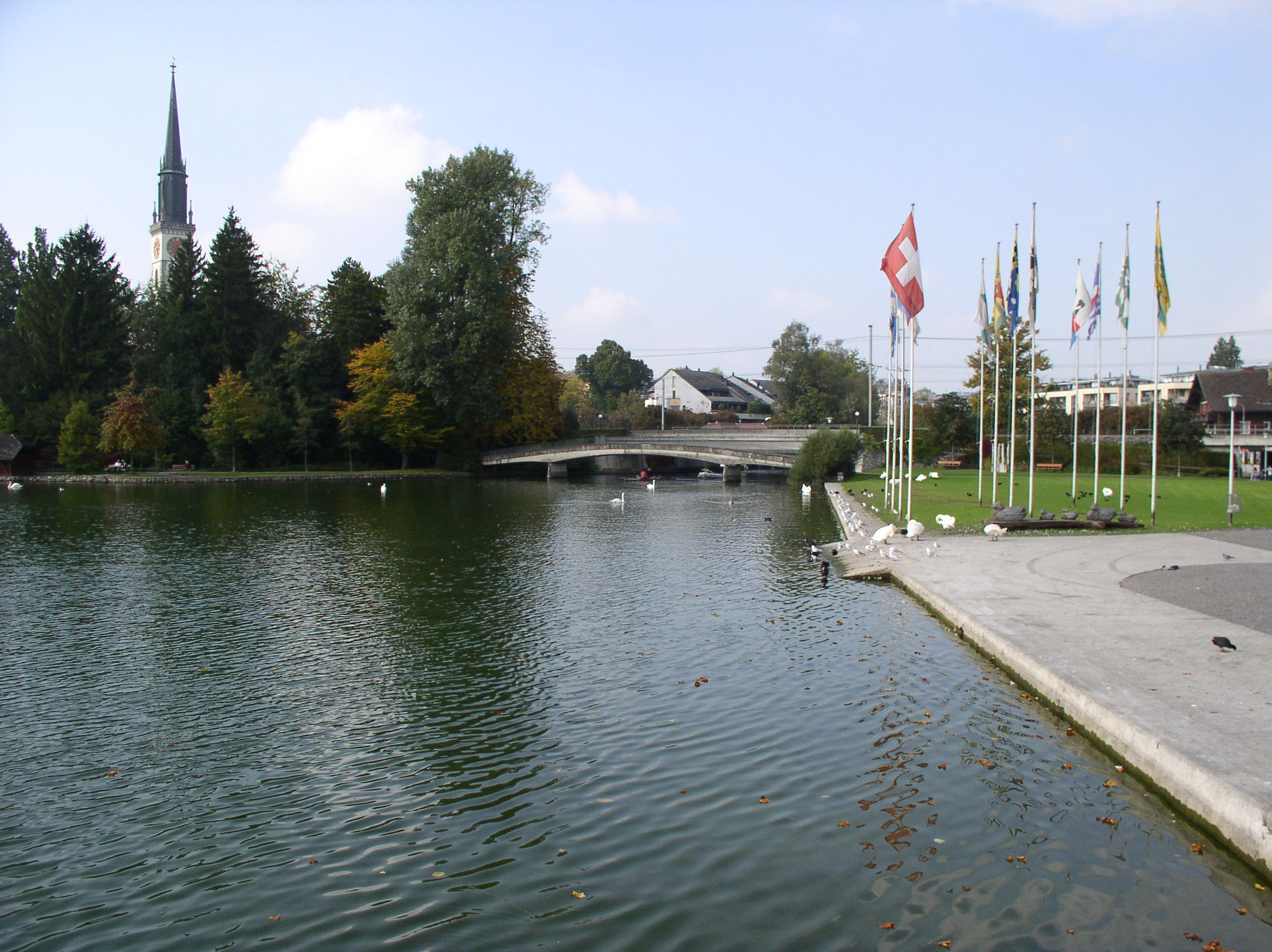
- Lorze at Cham, outflow of Lake Zug

Location
- Country: Switzerland

Physical characteristics
- Mouth: Reuss
  - coordinates: 47.2480°N 8.4107°E
- Basin size: 390 km^{2} (150 sq mi)

Basin features
- Progression: Reuss→ Aare→ Rhine→ North Sea

The Lorze is the main river of the Canton of Zug, Switzerland. It flows from Ägerisee through Lake Zug into the Reuss.

== See also ==
- List of rivers of Switzerland
