= Ägerisee =

- Lake Ägeri
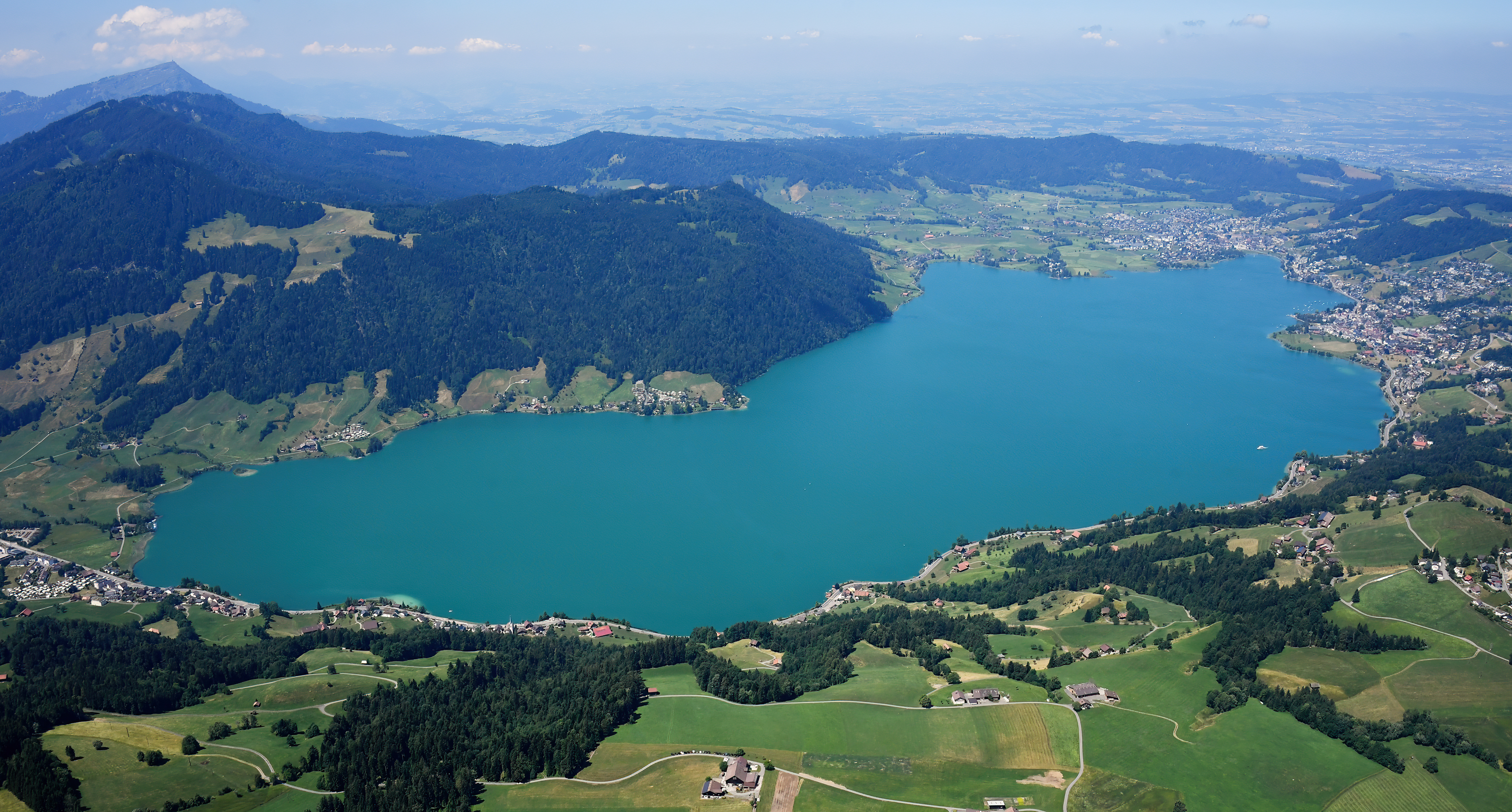
- Aerial view of Ägerisee from the east

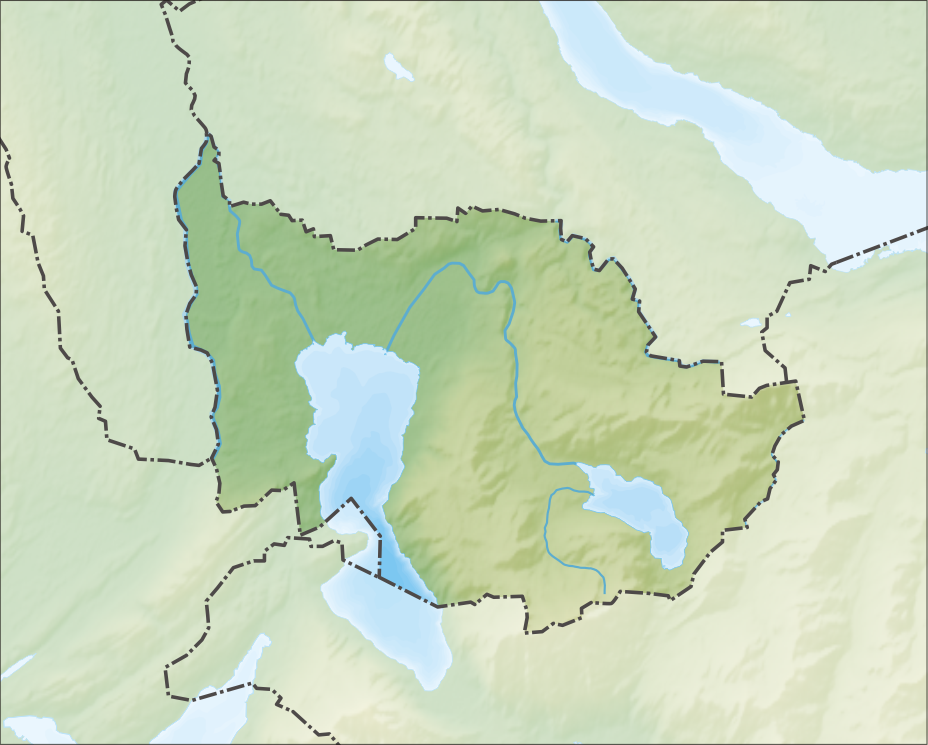
- Location within Canton of Zug Location within Switzerland Location within Alps
- Interactive map of Ägerisee
- Location: Canton of Zug
- Coordinates: 47°7′12″N 8°36′58″E
- Lake type: Glacial lake
- Primary inflows: Hüribach
- Primary outflows: Lorze
- Catchment area: 4.068 km^{2} (1.571 sq mi)
- Basin countries: Switzerland
- Max. length: 5.4 km (3.4 mi)
- Max. width: 1.4 km (0.87 mi)
- Surface area: 7.3 km^{2} (2.8 sq mi)
- Average depth: 49 m (161 ft)
- Max. depth: 83 m (272 ft)
- Water volume: 0.36 km^{3} (0.086 cu mi)
- Residence time: 6.8 years
- Surface elevation: 724 m (2,375 ft)
- Frozen: January/February in some winters
- Settlements: Oberägeri, Unterägeri

Ägerisee or Lake Aegeri is a glacial lake in the Canton of Zug, Switzerland. The two municipalities along its shore are Oberägeri and Unterägeri. The main tributary is the Hüribach; the Lorze river drains the Ägerisee. Since 1992 the lake has been used as a water reservoir.

The Battle of Morgarten took place in 1315 on the shores of the Ägerisee.

== Gallery ==
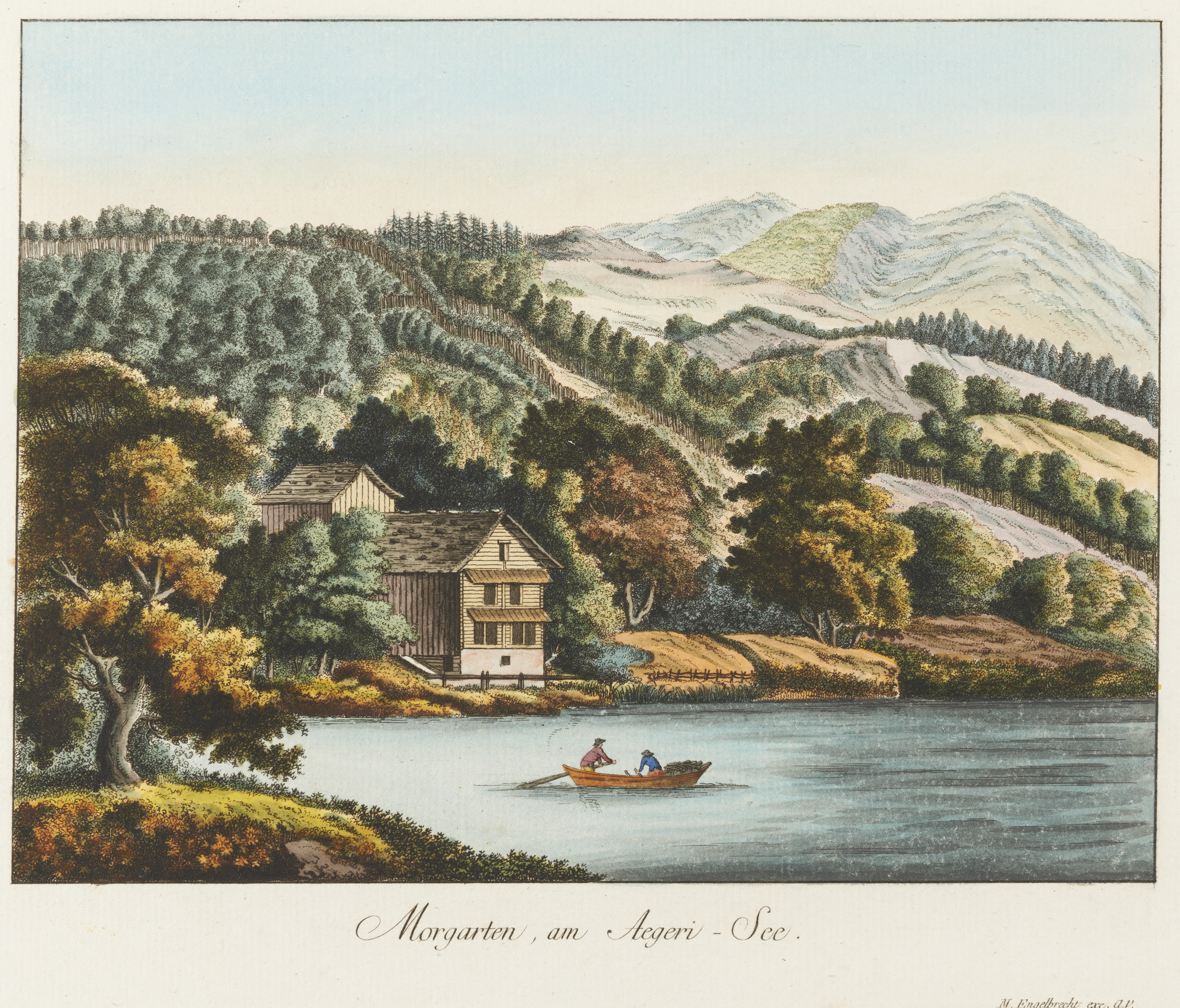

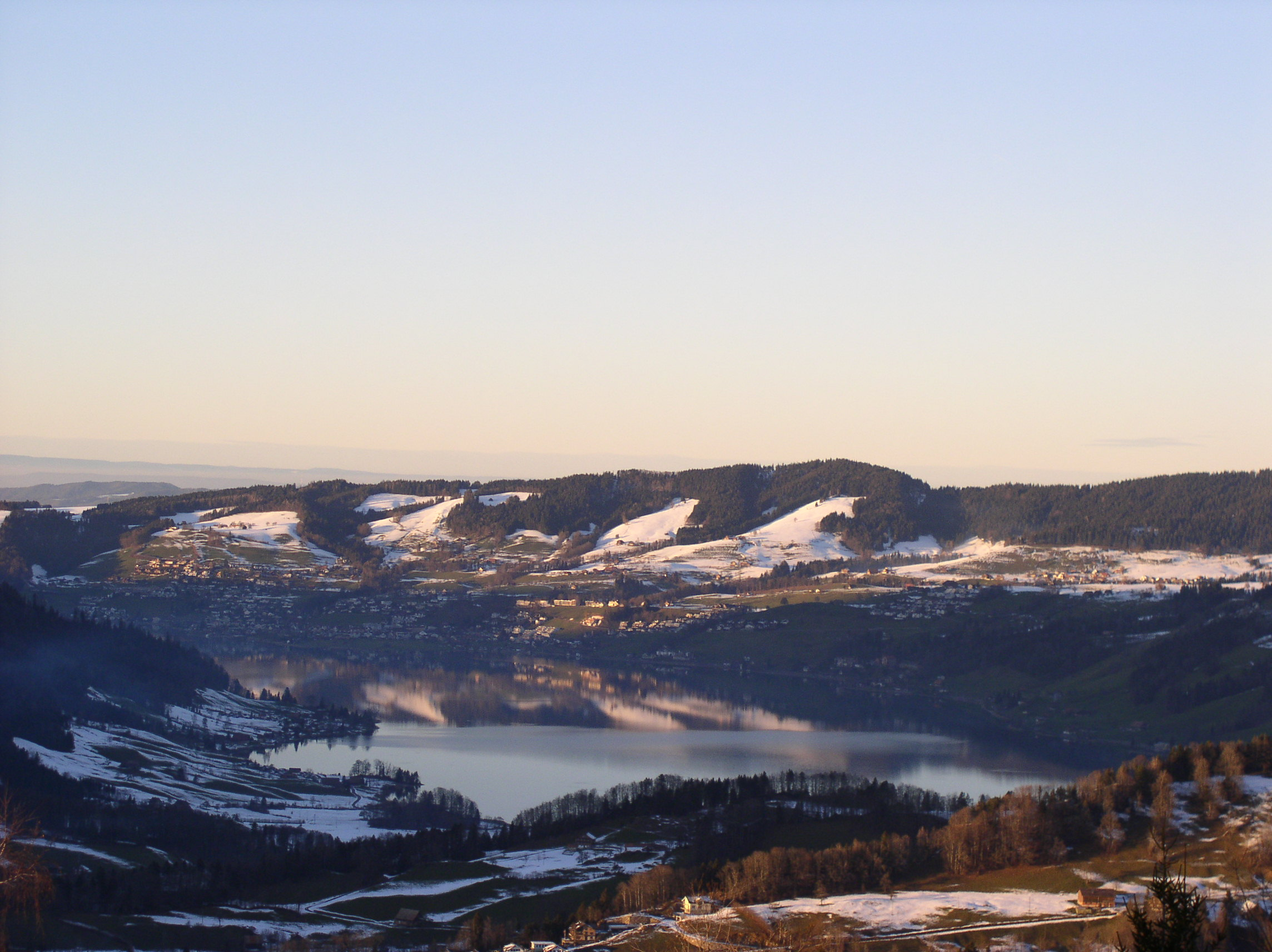

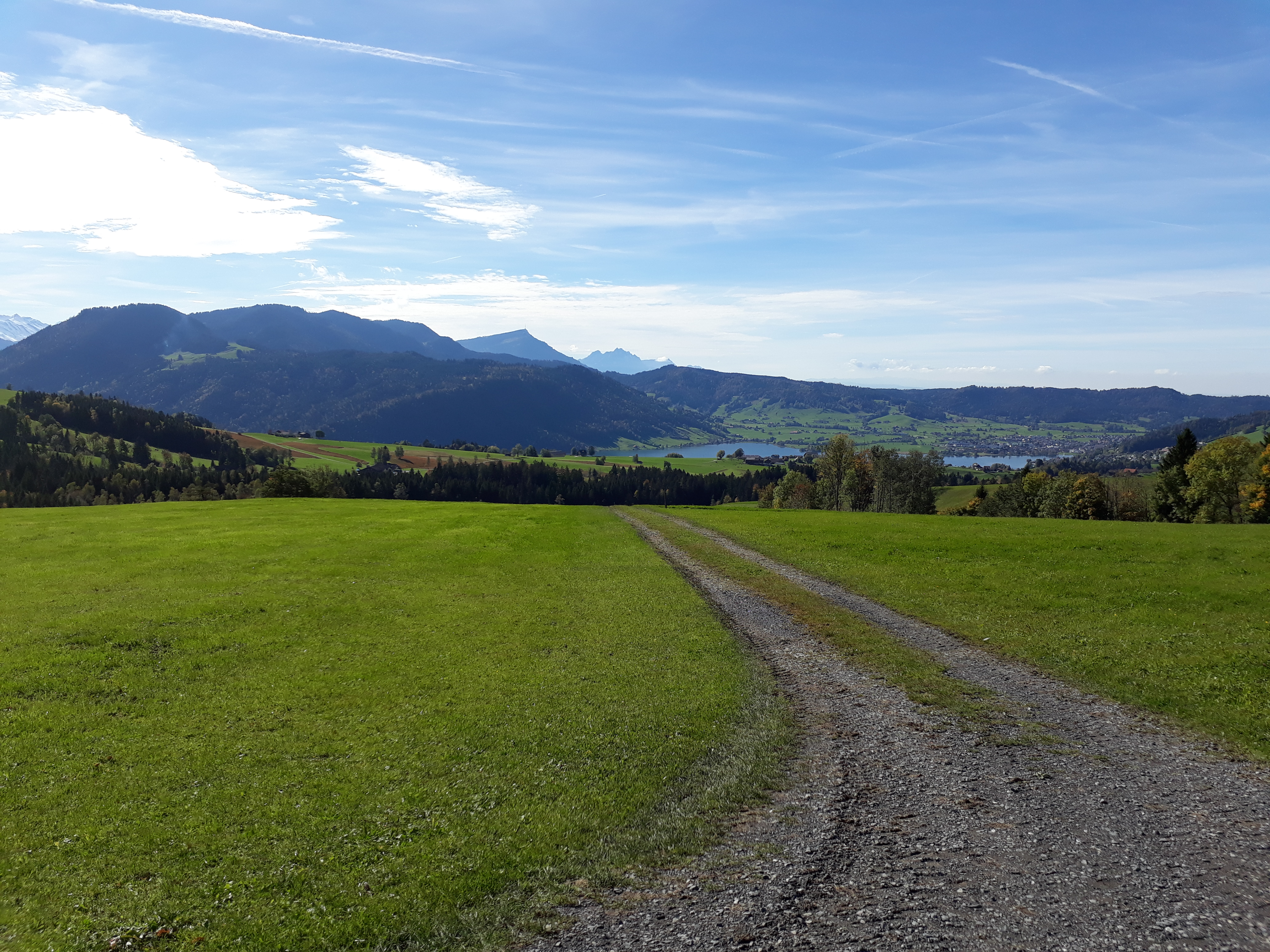

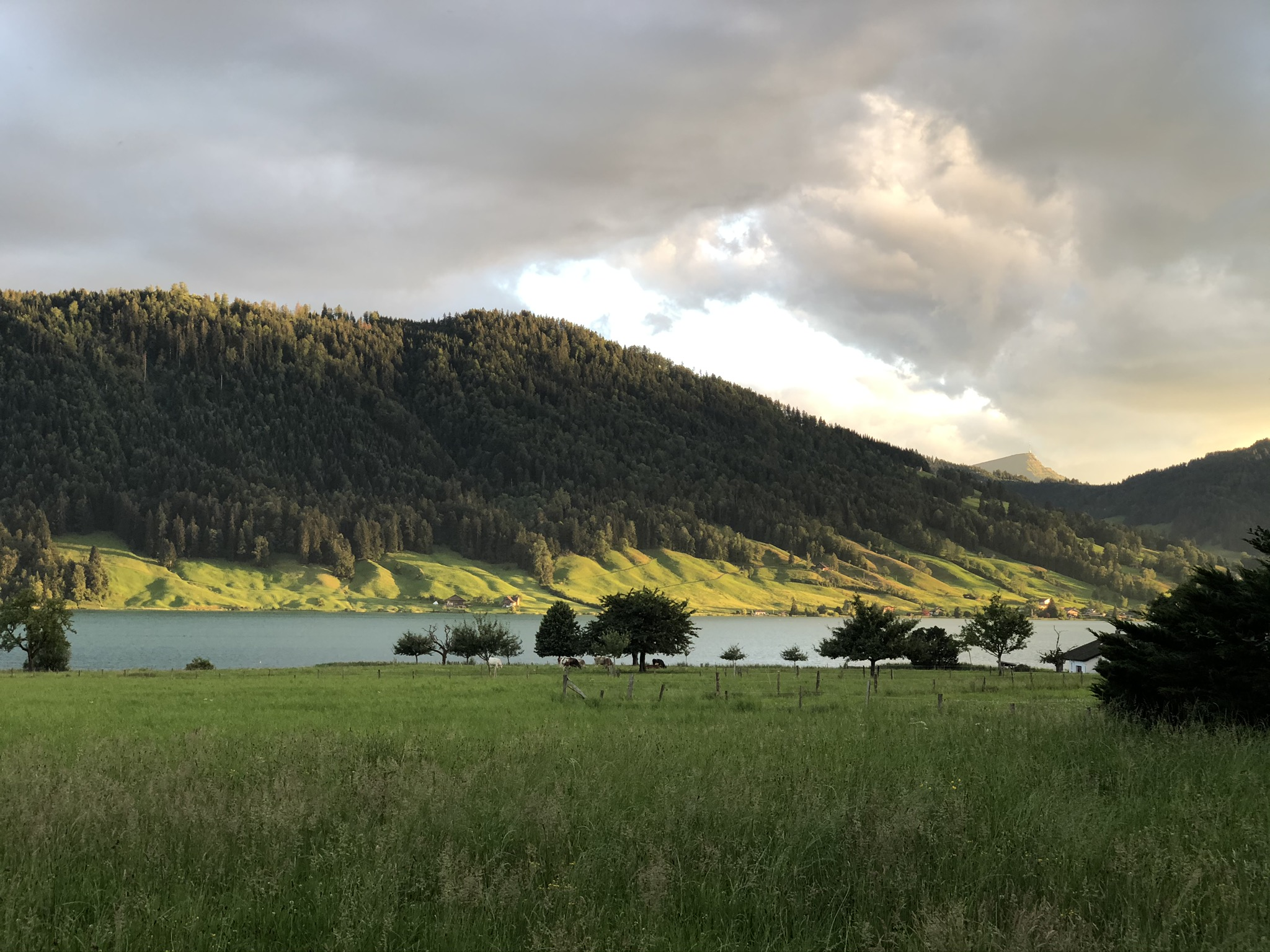

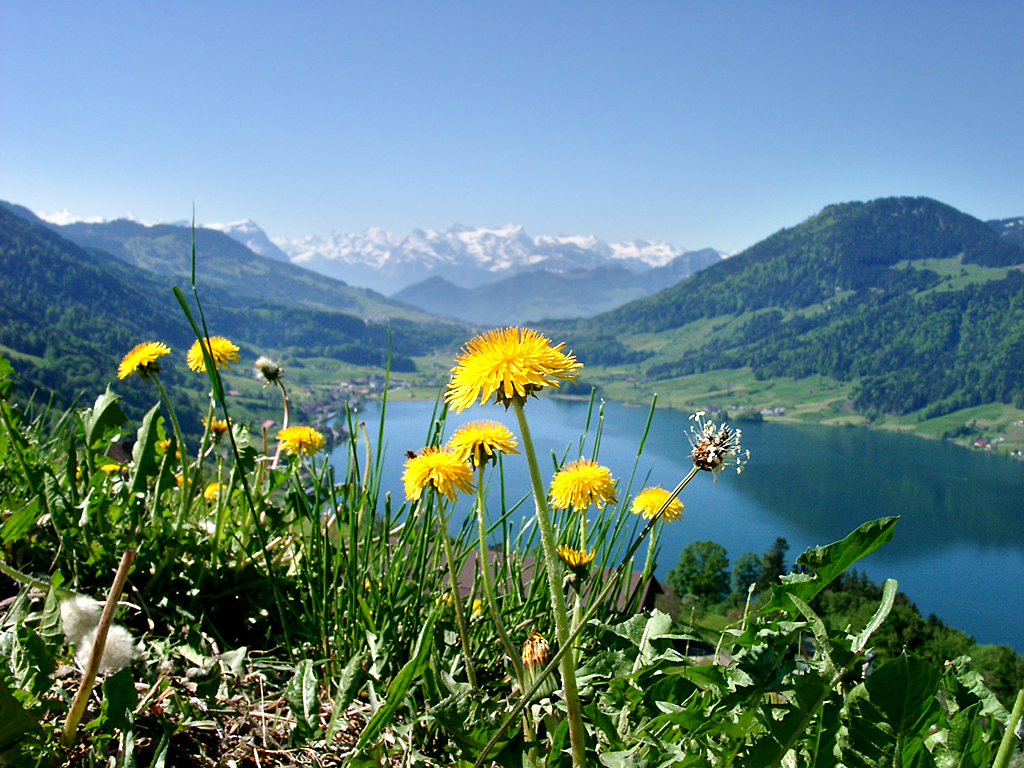

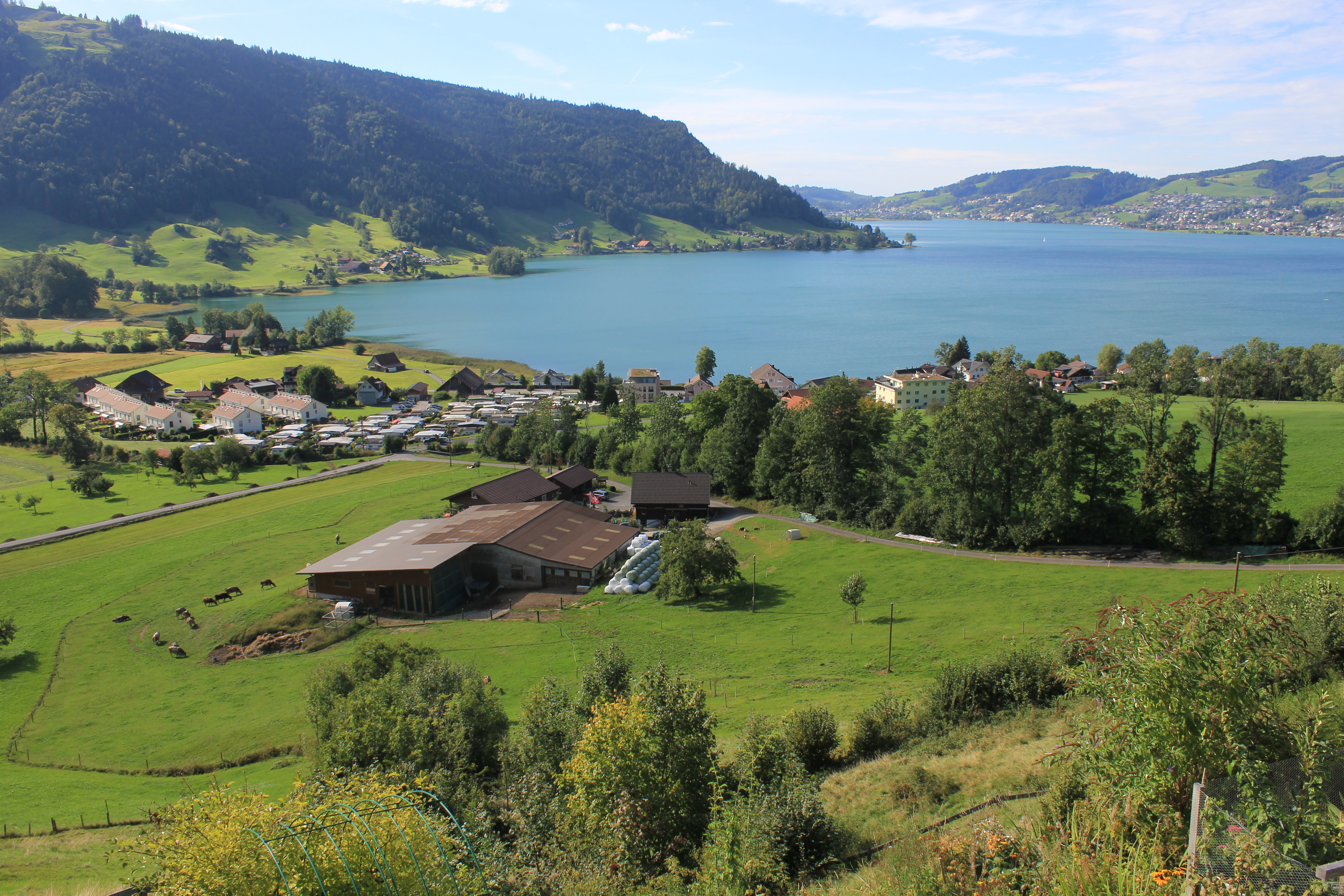

== See also ==
- List of lakes of Switzerland
