= Gisikon =

- Municipality
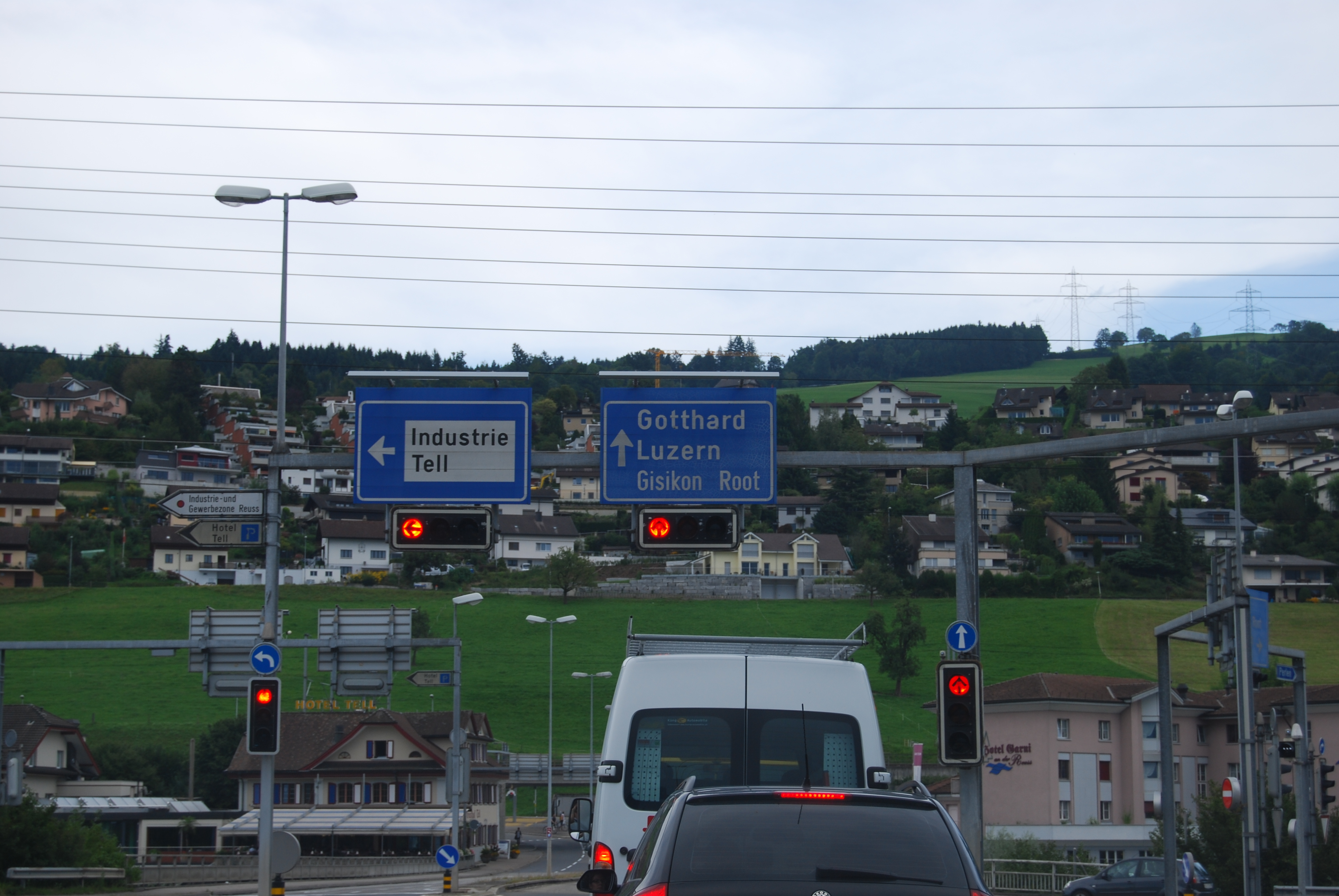

- Flag Coat of arms
- Location of Gisikon
- Location within Switzerland Location within Canton of Lucerne
- Coordinates: 47°7′N 8°24′E
- Country: Switzerland
- Canton: Lucerne
- District: Lucerne

Area
  - Total: 1.08 km^{2} (0.42 sq mi)
- Elevation: 418 m (1,371 ft)

Population (December 2020)
  - Total: 1,421
  - Density: 1,320/km^{2} (3,410/sq mi)
- Time zone: UTC+01:00 (CET)
  - Summer (DST): UTC+02:00 (CEST)
- Postal code: 6038
- SFOS number: 1055
- ISO 3166 code: CH-LU
- Surrounded by: Honau, Inwil, Root
- Website: https://www.gisikon.ch

Gisikon is a municipality in the district of Lucerne in the canton of Lucerne in Switzerland.

== History ==
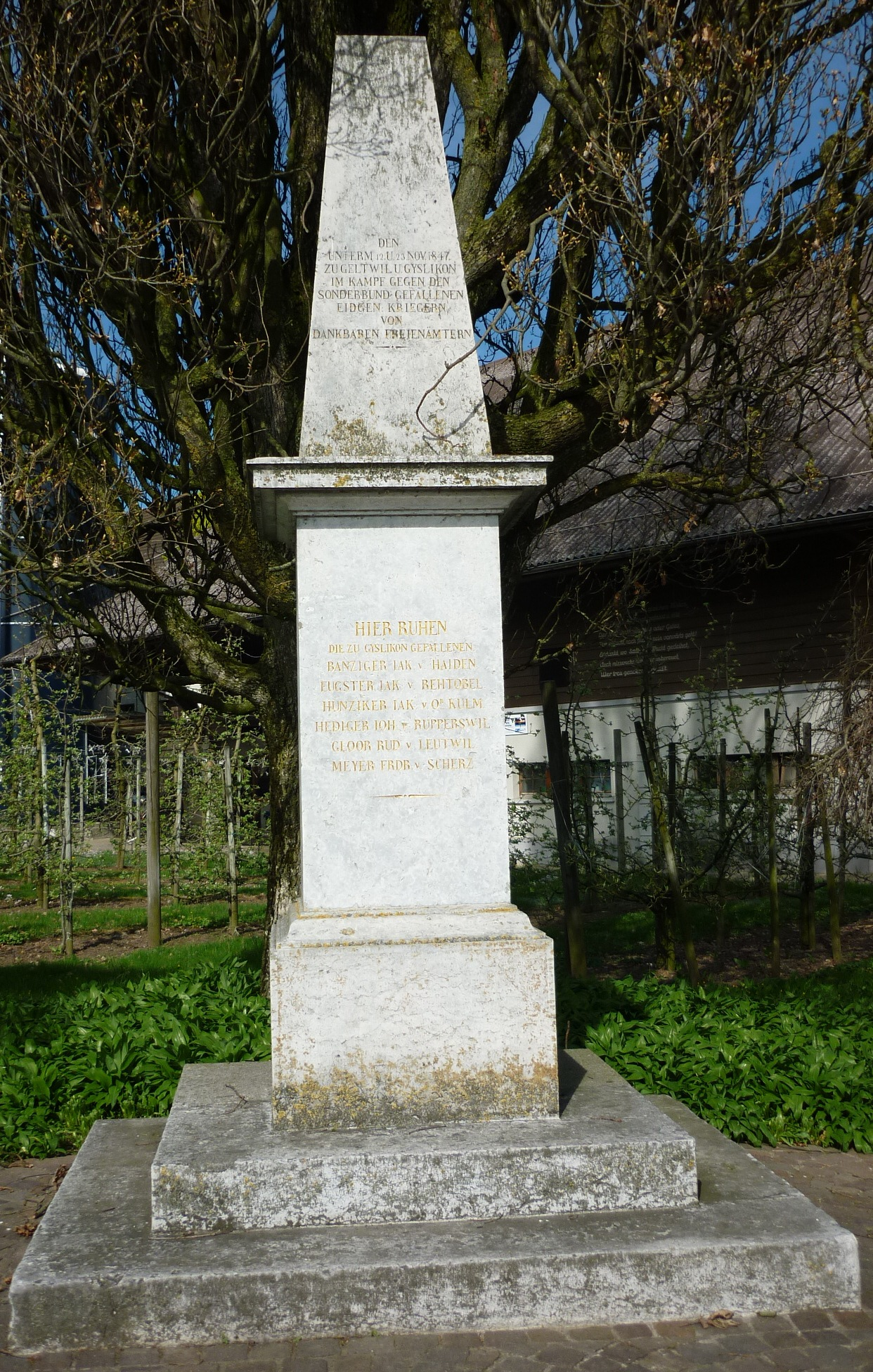
Geltwil memorial for the 1847 Gyslikon battle.

Gisikon is first mentioned around 1270 as Gisinkon. In the 19th century, especially referring to the battle that occurred on 23 November 1847 during the Sonderbund War or sometimes the battle of 5 June 1653 during the Swiss peasant war of 1653, the town was often (erroneously) called Gislikon.

== Geography ==
Gisikon has an area of 1.1 km^{2} (0.42 sq mi). Of this area, 50% is used for agricultural purposes, while 20% is forested. Of the rest of the land, 24.5% is settled (buildings or roads) and the remainder (5.5%) is non-productive (rivers, glaciers or mountains). In the 1997 land survey, 19.82% of the total land area was forested. Of the agricultural land, 46.85% is used for farming or pastures, while 2.7% is used for orchards or vine crops. Of the settled areas, 13.51% is covered with buildings, 2.7% is industrial, 0.9% is classed as special developments, and 8.11% is transportation infrastructure. Of the unproductive areas, 4.5% is unproductive flowing water (rivers) and 0.9% is other unproductive land.

The municipality is located in the Reuss valley on the old highway between Lucerne and Zürich.

== Demographics ==
Gisikon has a population (as of 31 December 2020) of 1,421. As of 2007, 9.6% of the population was made up of foreign nationals. Over the last 10 years the population has grown at a rate of 8%. Most of the population (as of 2000) speaks German (92.3%), with Albanian being second most common ( 1.5%) and French being third ( 1.2%).

In the 2007 election the most popular party was the SVP which received 40.2% of the vote. The next three most popular parties were the CVP (24%), the FDP (16.6%) and the SPS (10.8%).

The age distribution in Gisikon is; 241 people or 24.5% of the population is 0–19 years old. 290 people or 29.5% are 20–39 years old, and 378 people or 38.5% are 40–64 years old. The senior population distribution is 62 people or 6.3% are 65–79 years old, 9 or 0.9% are 80–89 years old and 2 people or 0.2% of the population are 90+ years old.

The entire Swiss population is generally well educated. In Gisikon about 83.9% of the population (between age 25–64) have completed either non-mandatory upper secondary education or additional higher education (either university or a Fachhochschule).

As of 2000 there are 323 households, of which 74 households (or about 22.9%) contain only a single individual. 25 or about 7.7% are large households, with at least five members. As of 2000 there were 186 inhabited buildings in the municipality, of which 165 were built only as housing, and 21 were mixed use buildings. There were 129 single family homes, 13 double family homes, and 23 multi-family homes in the municipality. Most homes were either two (87) or three (51) story structures. There were only 6 single story buildings and 21 four or more story buildings.

Gisikon has an unemployment rate of 1.65%. As of 2005, there were 17 people employed in the primary economic sector and about 7 businesses involved in this sector. 98 people are employed in the secondary sector and there are 12 businesses in this sector. 286 people are employed in the tertiary sector, with 25 businesses in this sector. As of 2000 58.2% of the population of the municipality were employed in some capacity. At the same time, females made up 40.4% of the workforce.

In the 2000 census the religious membership of Gisikon was; 585 (69.1%) were Roman Catholic, and 146 (17.2%) were Protestant, with an additional 14 (1.65%) that were of some other Christian faith. There are 21 individuals (2.48% of the population) who are Muslim. Of the rest; there were 8 (0.94%) individuals who belong to another religion, 65 (7.67%) who do not belong to any organized religion, 8 (0.94%) who did not answer the question.

The historical population is given in the following table:

year	population
1798	111
1850	153
1900	144
1950	185
1990	625
2000	847
