= Lucerne-Stadt District =

Coordinates: 47°2′N 8°18′E

Lucerne-Stadt District Wahlkreis Luzern-Stadt
- District
- Interactive map of Lucerne-Stadt District
- Country: Switzerland
- Canton: Luzern
- Capital: Luzern

Area
  - Total: 29.06 km^{2} (11.22 sq mi)

Population (2020)
  - Total: 82,620
  - Density: 2,843/km^{2} (7,364/sq mi)
- Time zone: UTC+1 (CET)
  - Summer (DST): UTC+2 (CEST)
- Municipalities: 1

Lucerne-Stadt District (German: Wahlkreis Luzern-Stadt) is one of the two new Wahlkreis formed from the former Lucerne Amt in 2013 in the Canton of Lucerne, Switzerland. It has a population of 82,620 (as of 31 December 2020) and includes only the city of Lucerne.

Municipalities	Population (31 December 2020)	Area (km²)
Lucerne	82,620	29.06^{b}
District of Lucerne-Stadt	82,620	29.06^{a}

^a 1992/97 survey gives a total area of 216.65 km^{2} (83.65 sq mi) without including certain large lakes, while the 2000 survey includes lakes and gives the higher value.
^b Includes the area of Littau which merged into Luzern on 1 January 2010.

== Mergers ==
On 1 January 2010 the municipality of Littau merged into the municipality of Lucerne.

The new Wahlkreis was created on 1 January 2013.
