= Honau =

Honau may refer to:

- Honau Abbey, a former monastery in Northern Alsace, France, which flourished from the 8th century until 1290
- Honau, Lichtenstein, a former municipality, currently part of Lichtenstein, Baden-Württemberg, Germany
- Honau, Rheinau, a former municipality, currently part of Rheinau, Baden-Württemberg, Germany
- Honau, Switzerland, a former municipality in Lucerne, Switzerland
