= Buchrain =

- Municipality
- Coat of arms
- Location of Buchrain
- Location within Switzerland Location within Canton of Lucerne
- Coordinates: 47°6′N 8°21′E
- Country: Switzerland
- Canton: Lucerne
- District: Lucerne

Area
  - Total: 4.8 km^{2} (1.9 sq mi)
- Elevation: 456 m (1,496 ft)

Population (December 2020)
  - Total: 6,400
  - Density: 1,300/km^{2} (3,500/sq mi)
- Time zone: UTC+01:00 (CET)
  - Summer (DST): UTC+02:00 (CEST)
- Postal code: 6033
- SFOS number: 1052
- ISO 3166 code: CH-LU
- Surrounded by: Dierikon, Ebikon, Emmen, Eschenbach, Inwil, Root
- Website: www.buchrain.ch

Buchrain (Swiss Standard German pronunciation: [ˈbuːxraɪn]) is a municipality in the district of Lucerne in the canton of Lucerne in Switzerland.

== History ==
Buchrain is first mentioned in 1257 as Buochren.

== Geography ==
Aerial view (1953)

Buchrain has an area of 4.8 km^{2} (1.9 sq mi). Of this area, 49.5% is used for agricultural purposes, while 17.1% is forested. Of the rest of the land, 27.3% is settled (buildings or roads) and the remainder (6.1%) is non-productive (rivers, glaciers or mountains). In the 1997 land survey, 17.15% of the total land area was forested. Of the agricultural land, 43.72% is used for farming or pastures, while 5.86% is used for orchards or vine crops. Of the settled areas, 10.04% is covered with buildings, 3.77% is industrial, 1.46% is classed as special developments, 2.72% is parks or greenbelts and 9.41% is transportation infrastructure. Of the unproductive areas, 0.21% is unproductive standing water (ponds or lakes), 4.81% is unproductive flowing water (rivers) and 0.84% is other unproductive land.

The municipality is located on the high lands known as the Hundsrüggen between the Reuss and Ron rivers. It consists of the linear village of Buchrain, the hamlet of Leisibach and the industrial park of Perlen.

== Demographics ==
Buchrain has a population (as of 31 December 2020) of 6,400. As of 2007, 17.9% of the population was made up of foreign nationals. Over the last 10 years the population has grown at a rate of 12.8%. Most of the population (as of 2000) speaks German (87.8%), with Serbo-Croatian being second most common ( 3.5%) and Italian being third ( 1.8%).

In the 2007 election the most popular party was the SVP which received 27.4% of the vote. The next three most popular parties were the FDP (23.5%), the CVP (22.5%) and the SPS (16%).

The age distribution in Buchrain is; 1,459 people or 26.5% of the population is 0–19 years old. 1,373 people or 24.9% are 20–39 years old, and 2,041 people or 37% are 40–64 years old. The senior population distribution is 502 people or 9.1% are 65–79 years old, 119 or 2.2% are 80–89 years old and 15 people or 0.3% of the population are 90+ years old.

The entire Swiss population is generally well educated. In Buchrain about 73.8% of the population (between age 25-64) have completed either non-mandatory upper secondary education or additional higher education (either university or a Fachhochschule).

As of 2000 there are 1,893 households, of which 469 households (or about 24.8%) contain only a single individual. 184 or about 9.7% are large households, with at least five members. As of 2000 there were 725 inhabited buildings in the municipality, of which 673 were built only as housing, and 52 were mixed use buildings. There were 462 single family homes, 62 double family homes, and 149 multi-family homes in the municipality. Most homes were either two (304) or three (242) story structures. There were only 27 single story buildings and 100 four or more story buildings.

Buchrain has an unemployment rate of 1.82%. As of 2005, there were 57 people employed in the primary economic sector and about 13 businesses involved in this sector. 555 people are employed in the secondary sector and there are 37 businesses in this sector. 853 people are employed in the tertiary sector, with 99 businesses in this sector. As of 2000 53.2% of the population of the municipality were employed in some capacity. At the same time, females made up 41.8% of the workforce.

In the 2000 census the religious membership of Buchrain was; 3,351 (67.3%) were Roman Catholic, and 670 (13.5%) were Protestant, with an additional 217 (4.36%) that were of some other Christian faith. There are 4 individuals (0.08% of the population) who are Jewish. There are 280 individuals (5.63% of the population) who are Muslim. Of the rest; there were 37 (0.74%) individuals who belong to another religion, 315 (6.33%) who do not belong to any organized religion, 102 (2.05%) who did not answer the question.

The historical population is given in the following table:

year	population
1695	198
1798	234
1850	312
1900	750
1950	1,127
1970	2,741
2000	4,976
2013	6,143
