= Schwarzenberg, Switzerland =

Schwarzenberg
- Municipality
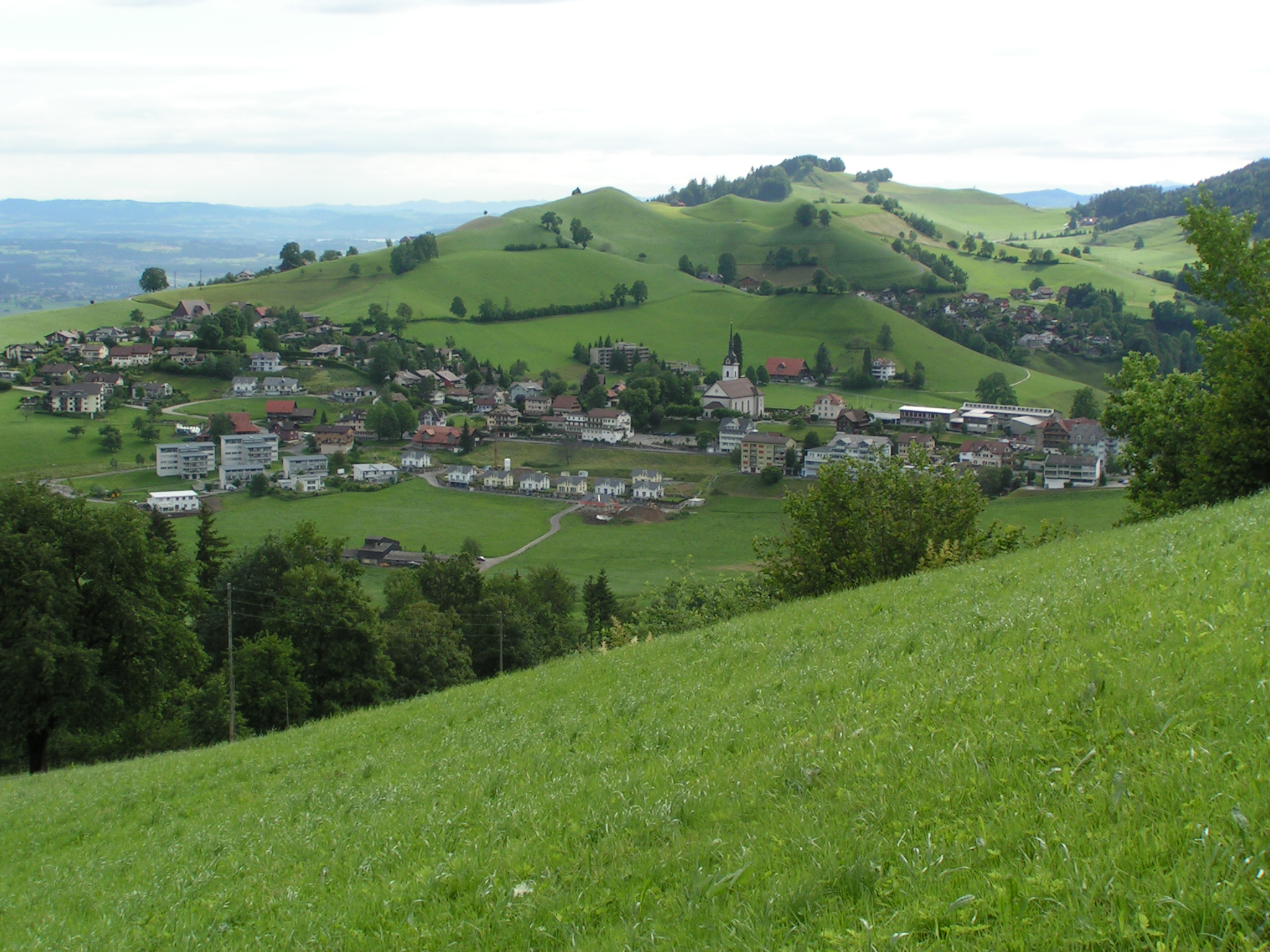

- Coat of arms
- Location of Schwarzenberg
- Location within Switzerland Location within Canton of Lucerne
- Coordinates: 47°1′N 8°10′E
- Country: Switzerland
- Canton: Lucerne
- District: Lucerne

Area
  - Total: 39.31 km^{2} (15.18 sq mi)
- Elevation: 823 m (2,700 ft)

Population (December 2007)
  - Total: 1,602
  - Density: 40.75/km^{2} (105.5/sq mi)
- Time zone: UTC+01:00 (CET)
  - Summer (DST): UTC+02:00 (CEST)
- Postal code: 6103
- SFOS number: 1066
- ISO 3166 code: CH-LU
- Surrounded by: Alpnach (OW), Entlebuch, Hergiswil (NW), Kriens, Malters, Werthenstein
- Website: www.schwarzenberg.ch

Schwarzenberg (German pronunciation: [ˈʃvaʁtsn̩ˌbɛʁk]) is a municipality in the district of Lucerne in the canton of Lucerne in Switzerland.

== Geography ==
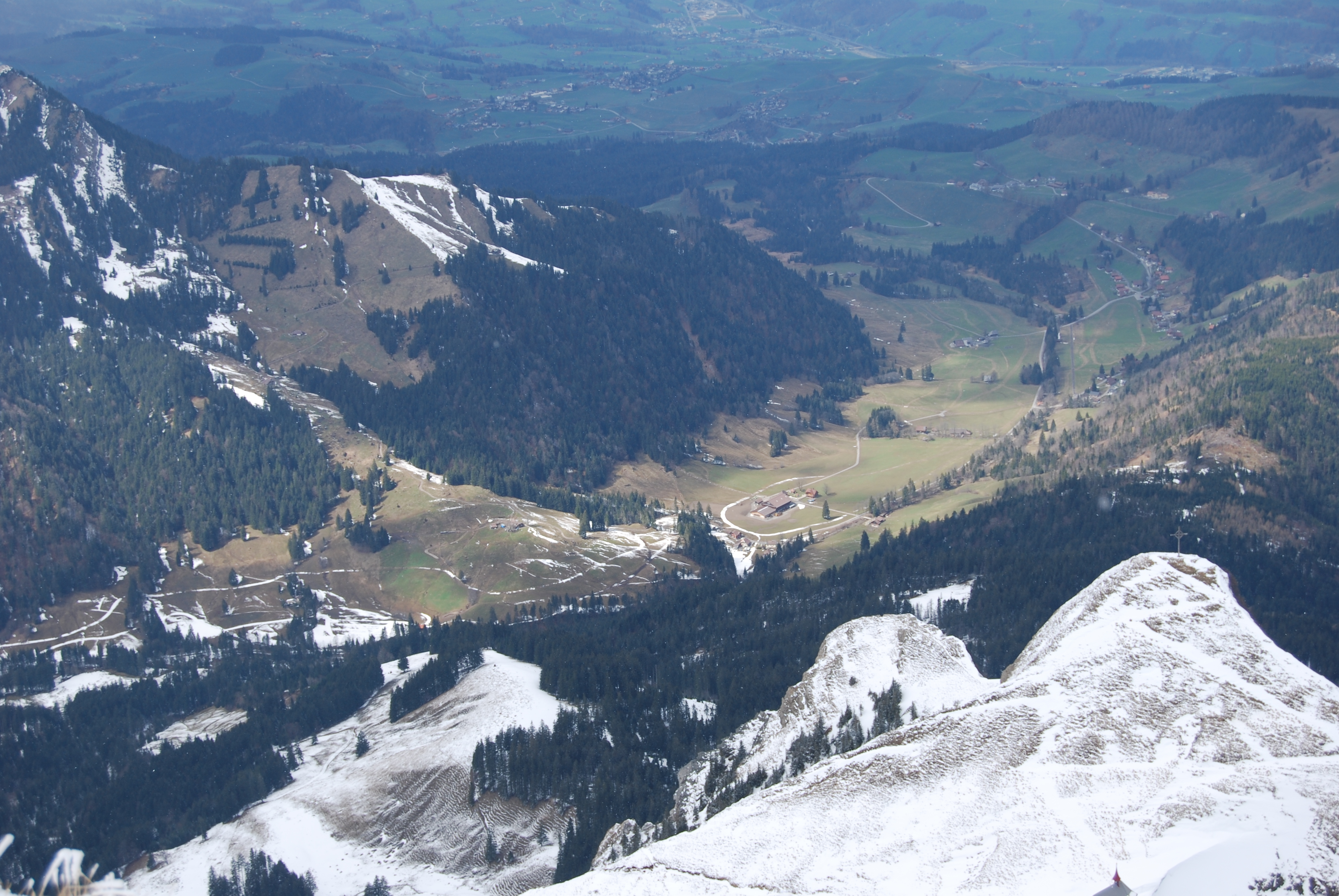
View from Mt. Pilatus to Eigenthal and Schwarzenberg

Aerial view (1954)

Schwarzenberg has an area of 39.2 km^{2} (15.1 sq mi). Of this area, 36.7% is used for agricultural purposes, while 53.8% is forested. Of the rest of the land, 2.7% is settled (buildings or roads) and the remainder (6.9%) is non-productive (rivers, glaciers or mountains). In the 1997 land survey, 53.79% of the total land area was forested. Of the agricultural land, 36.34% is used for farming or pastures, while 0.33% is used for orchards or vine crops. Of the settled areas, 1.45% is covered with buildings, 0.13% is industrial, 0.1% is classed as special developments, 0.05% is parks or greenbelts and 0.94% is transportation infrastructure. Of the unproductive areas, 0.87% is unproductive flowing water (rivers) and 5.99% is other unproductive land.

== Demographics ==
Schwarzenberg has a population (as of 2007) of 1,602, of which 6.1% are foreign nationals. Over the last 10 years the population has grown at a rate of 11.4%. Most of the population (as of 2000) speaks German (97.6%), with Serbo-Croatian being second most common ( 0.7%) and French being third ( 0.3%).

In the 2007 election the most popular party was the FDP which received 33.8% of the vote. The next three most popular parties were the SVP (30.6%), the CVP (23.4%) and the SPS (5.1%).

The age distribution in Schwarzenberg is; 438 people or 27% of the population is 0–19 years old. 383 people or 23.6% are 20–39 years old, and 615 people or 37.8% are 40–64 years old. The senior population distribution is 147 people or 9% are 65–79 years old, 38 or 2.3% are 80–89 years old and 4 people or 0.2% of the population are 90+ years old.

In Schwarzenberg about 66.4% of the population (between age 25-64) have completed either non-mandatory upper secondary education or additional higher education (either university or a Fachhochschule).

As of 2000 there are 511 households, of which 106 households (or about 20.7%) contain only a single individual. 87 or about 17.% are large households, with at least five members. As of 2000 there were 378 inhabited buildings in the municipality, of which 284 were built only as housing, and 94 were mixed use buildings. There were 219 single family homes, 45 double family homes, and 20 multi-family homes in the municipality. Most homes were either two (171) or three (87) story structures. There were only 18 single story buildings and 8 four or more story buildings.

Schwarzenberg has an unemployment rate of 0.62%. As of 2005, there were 167 people employed in the primary economic sector and about 67 businesses involved in this sector. 78 people are employed in the secondary sector and there are 16 businesses in this sector. 145 people are employed in the tertiary sector, with 27 businesses in this sector. As of 2000 52.9% of the population of the municipality were employed in some capacity. At the same time, females made up 40.8% of the workforce.

In the 2000 census the religious membership of Schwarzenberg was; 1,198 (80.5%) were Roman Catholic, and 151 (10.1%) were Protestant, with an additional 20 (1.34%) that were of some other Christian faith. There are 6 individuals (0.4% of the population) who are Muslim. Of the rest; there were 2 (0.13%) individuals who belong to another religion, 75 (5.04%) who do not belong to any organized religion, 37 (2.48%) who did not answer the question.
