= Inwil =

- Municipality
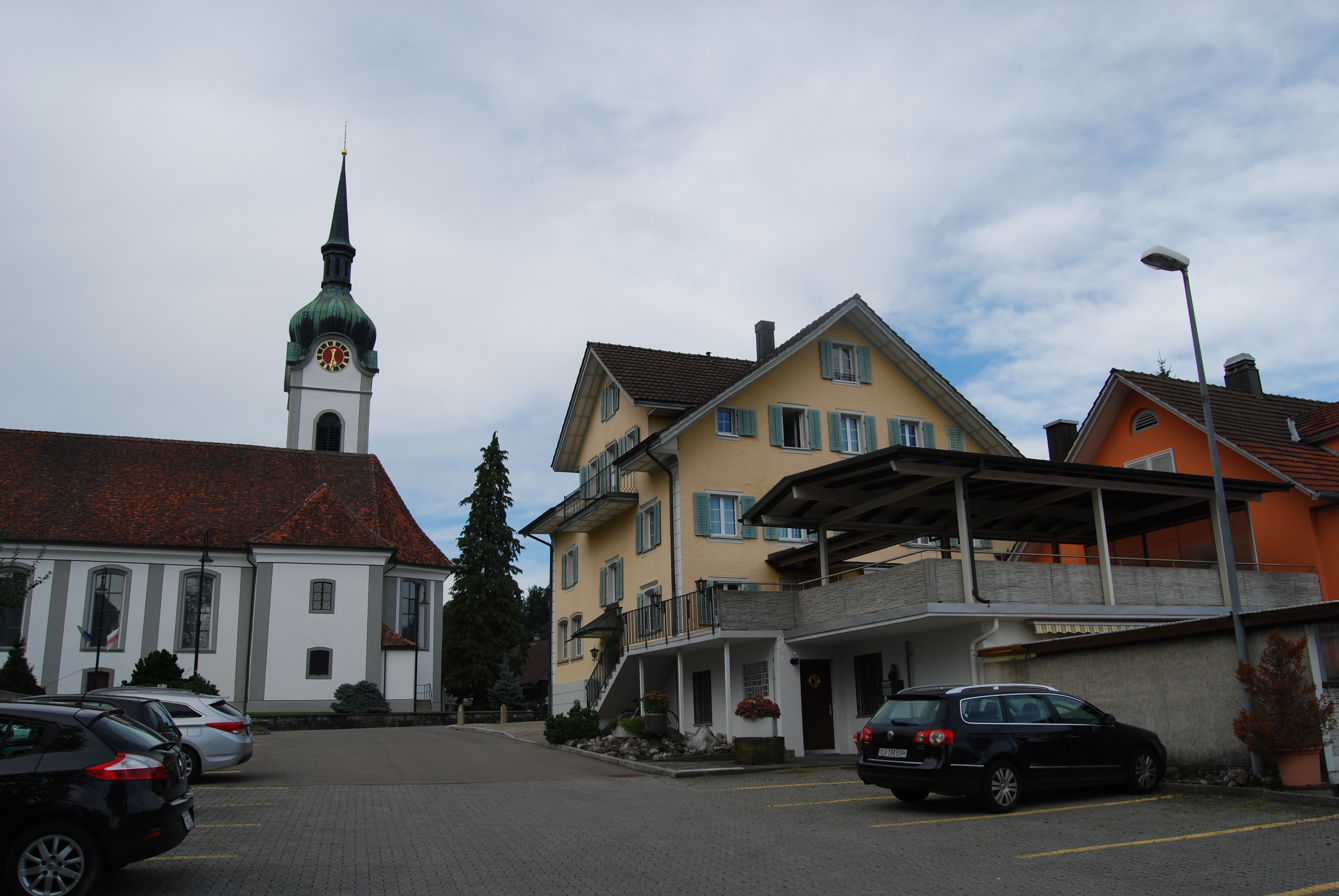

- Coat of arms
- Location of Inwil
- Location within Switzerland Location within Canton of Lucerne
- Coordinates: 47°7′N 8°21′E
- Country: Switzerland
- Canton: Lucerne
- District: Hochdorf

Area
  - Total: 10.32 km^{2} (3.98 sq mi)
- Elevation: 423 m (1,388 ft)

Population (December 2020)
  - Total: 2,706
  - Density: 262.2/km^{2} (679.1/sq mi)
- Time zone: UTC+01:00 (CET)
  - Summer (DST): UTC+02:00 (CEST)
- Postal code: 6034
- SFOS number: 1033
- ISO 3166 code: CH-LU
- Surrounded by: Ballwil, Buchrain, Dietwil (AG), Eschenbach, Gisikon, Honau, Root, Sins (AG)
- Website: www.inwil.ch

Inwil is a municipality in the district of Hochdorf in the canton of Lucerne in Switzerland.

== History ==
Inwil is first mentioned in 1145 as Ingenwilare.

== Geography ==
Aerial view (1953)

Inwil has an area of 10.3 km^{2} (4.0 sq mi). Of this area, 70.8% is used for agricultural purposes, while 16.3% is forested. Of the rest of the land, 11.4% is settled (buildings or roads) and the remainder (1.5%) is non-productive (rivers, glaciers or mountains). In the 1997 land survey, 16.18% of the total land area was forested. Of the agricultural land, 67.15% is used for farming or pastures, while 3.49% is used for orchards or vine crops. Of the settled areas, 5.14% is covered with buildings, 1.07% is industrial, 1.16% is classed as special developments, 0.1% is parks or greenbelts and 4.17% is transportation infrastructure. Of the unproductive areas, 1.26% is unproductive flowing water (rivers) and 0.29% is other unproductive land.

The municipality is located in the Reuss River valley (Reusstal) on the border with the Canton of Aargau.

== Demographics ==
Inwil has a population (as of 31 December 2020) of 2,706. As of 2007, 7.6% of the population was made up of foreign nationals. Over the last 10 years the population has grown at a rate of 23.8%. Most of the population (as of 2000) speaks German (95.6%), with Serbo-Croatian being second most common ( 1.5%) and Portuguese being third ( 1.2%).

In the 2007 election the most popular party was the CVP which received 34.3% of the vote. The next three most popular parties were the SVP (32.8%), the FDP (20.5%) and the SPS (6%).

The age distribution in Inwil is; 557 people or 26% of the population is 0–19 years old. 609 people or 28.5% are 20–39 years old, and 717 people or 33.5% are 40–64 years old. The senior population distribution is 191 people or 8.9% are 65–79 years old, 53 or 2.5% are 80–89 years old and 13 people or 0.6% of the population are 90+ years old.

The entire Swiss population is generally well educated. In Inwil about 78.3% of the population (between age 25–64) have completed either non-mandatory upper secondary education or additional higher education (either university or a Fachhochschule).

As of 2000 there are 662 households, of which 163 households (or about 24.6%) contain only a single individual. 101 or about 15.3% are large households, with at least five members. As of 2000 there were 328 inhabited buildings in the municipality, of which 243 were built only as housing, and 85 were mixed use buildings. There were 131 single family homes, 55 double family homes, and 57 multi-family homes in the municipality. Most homes were either two (129) or three (86) story structures. There were only 12 single story buildings and 16 four or more story buildings.

Inwil has an unemployment rate of 1.1%. As of 2005, there were 230 people employed in the primary economic sector and about 52 businesses involved in this sector. 253 people are employed in the secondary sector and there are 34 businesses in this sector. 367 people are employed in the tertiary sector, with 48 businesses in this sector. As of 2000 56.3% of the population of the municipality were employed in some capacity. At the same time, females made up 39.6% of the workforce.

In the 2000 census the religious membership of Inwil was; 1,485 (83.3%) were Roman Catholic, and 131 (7.3%) were Protestant, with an additional 33 (1.85%) that were of some other Christian faith. There are 12 individuals (0.67% of the population) who are Muslim. Of the rest; there were 3 (0.17%) individuals who belong to another religion, 83 (4.66%) who do not belong to any organized religion, 36 (2.02%) who did not answer the question.

The historical population is given in the following table:

year	population
about 1695	c. 400
1798	670
1837	101
1850	817
1900	792
1950	1,040
2000	1,783
