= Rooterberg =

Mountain in Switzerland

- Michaelskreuz
- Location within Switzerland

Highest point
- Elevation: 840 m (2,760 ft)
- Prominence: 380 m (1,250 ft)
- Parent peak: Rigi
- Coordinates: 47°05′53″N 8°23′38″E

Geography
- Location: Lucerne, Switzerland
- Parent range: Alps

The Rooterberg (840 m) is a mountain north of the Alps, located between Root and Udligenswil in the canton of Lucerne. The mountain lies north of Lake Lucerne and west of Lake Zug, at the foothills of the Alps.
