= Littau =

- Former municipality
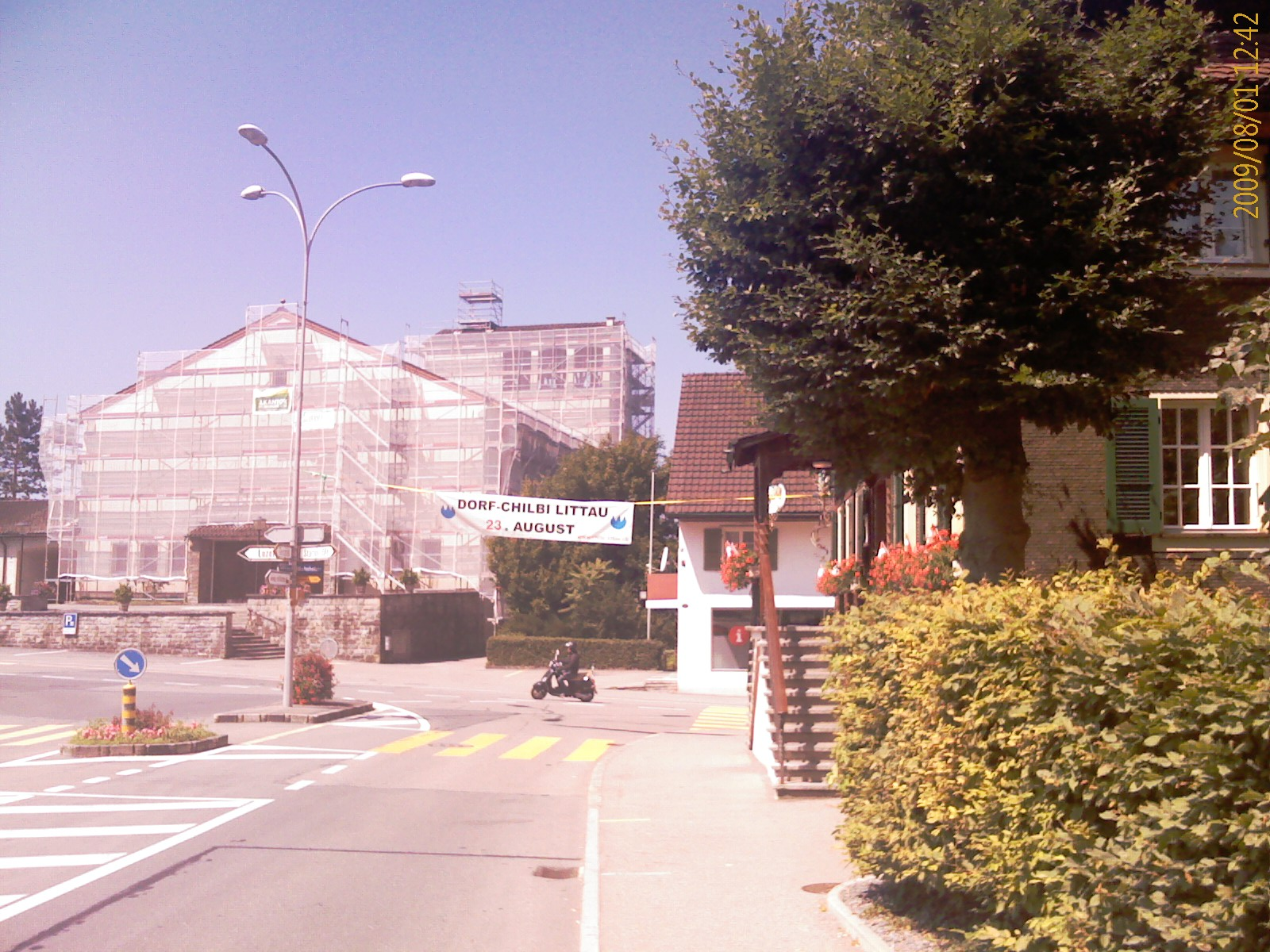

- Coat of arms
- Location of Littau
- Location within Switzerland Location within Canton of Lucerne
- Coordinates: 47°3′N 8°16′E
- Country: Switzerland
- Canton: Lucerne
- District: Lucerne

Area
  - Total: 13.25 km^{2} (5.12 sq mi)
- Elevation: 511 m (1,677 ft)

Population (December 2009)
  - Total: 17,224
  - Density: 1,300/km^{2} (3,367/sq mi)
- Demonym: Littauer
- Time zone: UTC+01:00 (CET)
  - Summer (DST): UTC+02:00 (CEST)
- Postal code: 6014
- SFOS number: 1060
- ISO 3166 code: CH-LU
- Surrounded by: Emmen, Kriens, Lucerne (Luzern), Malters, Neuenkirch
- Website: Profile (in German), SFSO statistics

Littau (German pronunciation: [ˈlɪtaʊ]) is a former municipality, and now part of the city of Lucerne, in the district of Lucerne in the canton of Lucerne in Switzerland. On 1 January 2010 the municipality of Littau merged into the municipality of Lucerne.

== History ==
Littau is first mentioned in 1178 as Litowo. On 1 January 2010, Littau has merged with the city (and municipality) of Lucerne. Art. 5 of the merger treaty states that the new municipality's name is to be "Luzern".

== Geography ==
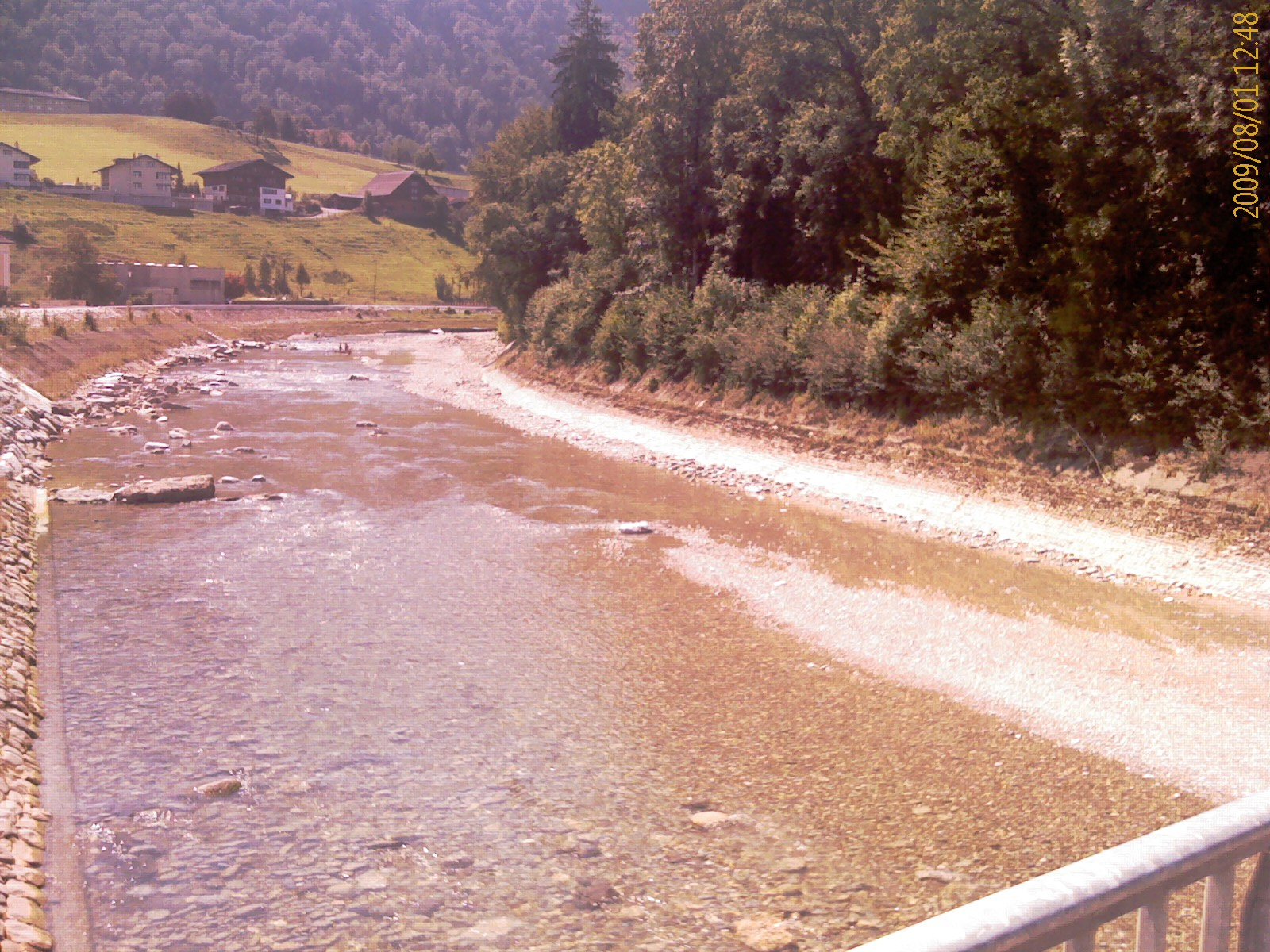
Kleine Emme river at Littau

Aerial view by Walter Mittelholzer (before 1937)

Littau has an area of 13.3 km^{2} (5.1 sq mi). Of this area, 52.3% is used for agricultural purposes, while 21.1% is forested. Of the rest of the land, 24.8% is settled (buildings or roads) and the remainder (1.7%) is non-productive (rivers, glaciers or mountains). In the 1997 land survey, 21.08% of the total land area was forested. Of the agricultural land, 49.17% is used for farming or pastures, while 3.16% is used for orchards or vine crops. Of the settled areas, 10.47% is covered with buildings, 4.29% is industrial, 1.96% is classed as special developments, 2.33% is parks or greenbelts and 5.8% is transportation infrastructure. Of the unproductive areas, 1.66% is unproductive flowing water (rivers) and 0.08% is other unproductive land.

The former municipality is located along both sides of the Kleine Emme river. It grew out of four separate sections which each had their own topography and individual history. The first section was the village of Littau, second Niederlittau and Littauerboden, third the individual farm house of the Littauerberg area and fourth Reussbühl and Ruopigen.

== Demographics ==
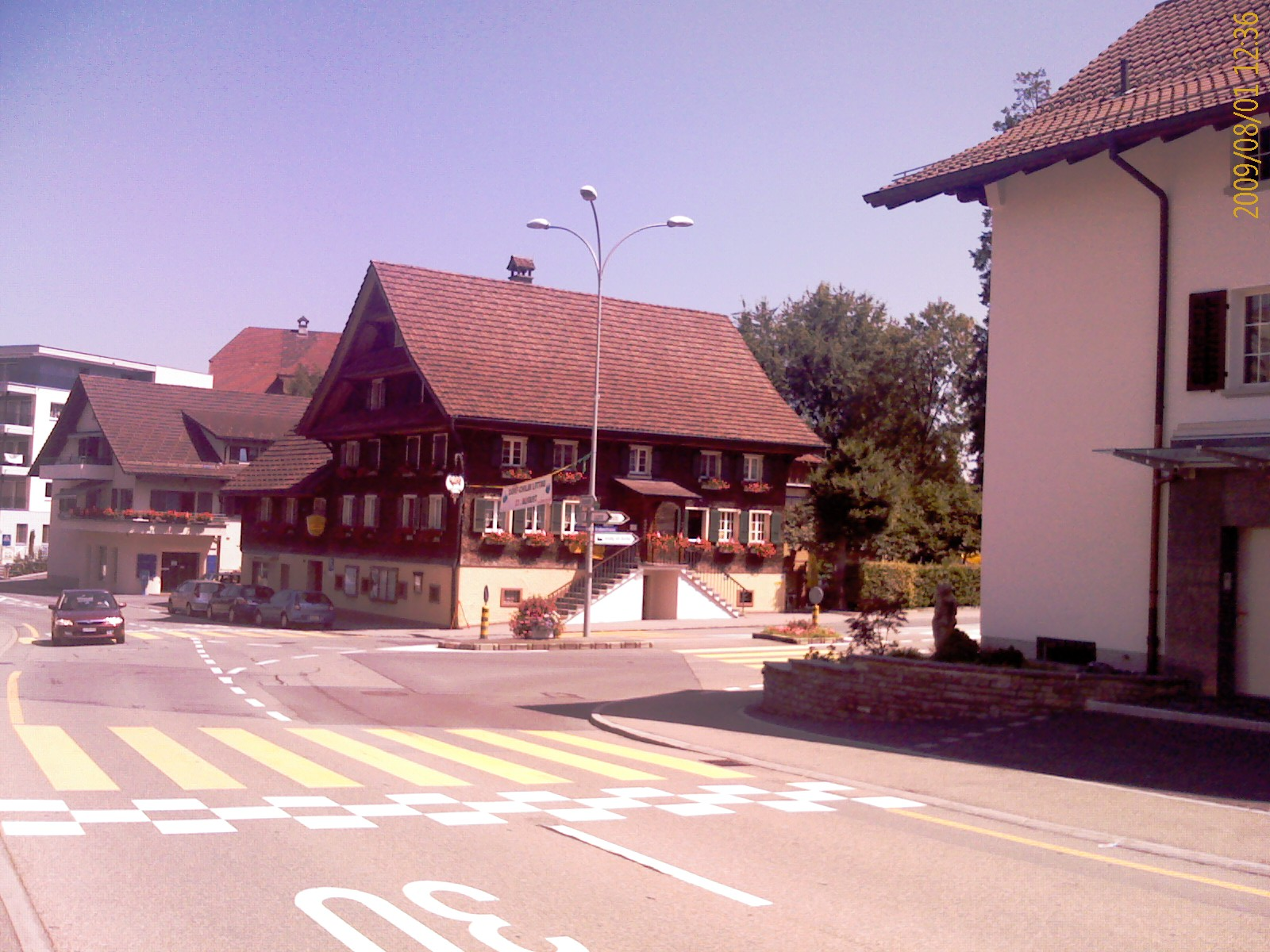
Village center of Littau

Littau had a population (in 2009) of 17,224. As of 2007, 36.6% of the population was made up of foreign nationals. Over the previous 10 years the population had grown at a rate of 6.1%. Most of the population (as of 2000) speaks German (75.6%), with Italian being second-most common (6.2%) and Serbo-Croatian being third (6.0%).

In the 2007 election the most popular party was the SVP which received 29.5% of the vote. The next three most popular parties were the CVP (26.5%), the FDP (21%) and the SPS (14.3%).

The age distribution in Littau was as follows: 3,821 people or 22.6% of the population were 0–19 years old, 4,986 people or 29.5% were 20–39 years old, and 5,800 people or 34.3% were 40–64 years old. The senior population distribution was 1,786 people or 10.6% were 65–79 years old, 451 or 2.7% were 80–89 years old and 61 people or 0.4% of the population were 90+ years old.

The entire Swiss population is generally well educated. In Littau about 56.4% of the population (between age 25-64) have completed either non-mandatory upper secondary education or additional higher education (either university or a Fachhochschule).

As of 2000 there were 6,636 households, of which 2,218 households (or about 33.4%) contained only a single individual. 467 or about 7.% were large households, with at least five members. As of 2000 there were 1,292 inhabited buildings in the municipality, of which 1,026 were built only as housing, and 266 were mixed-use buildings. There were 435 single family homes, 91 double family homes, and 500 multi-family homes in the municipality. Most homes were either two- (310) or three- (293) story structures. There were only 31 single-story buildings and 392 four- or more story buildings.

Littau had an unemployment rate of 3.76%. As of 2005, there were 162 people employed in the primary economic sector and about 48 businesses involved in this sector. 2189 people were employed in the secondary sector and there are 167 businesses in this sector. 3532 people were employed in the tertiary sector, with 400 businesses in this sector. As of 2000 53.9% of the population of the municipality were employed in some capacity. At the same time, females made up 44% of the workforce.

In the 2000 census the religious membership of Littau was: 10,154 (63.7%) were Roman Catholic, and 1,643 (10.3%) were Protestant, with an additional 966 (6.06%) that were of some other Christian faith. There were 8 individuals (0.05% of the population) who were Jewish. There are 1,270 individuals (7.97% of the population) who were Muslim. Of the rest, there were 226 (1.42%) individuals who belonged to another religion, 866 (5.44%) who did not belong to any organized religion, and 796 (5.%) who did not answer the question.

The historical population is given in the following table:

Population of Littau
Year	Population
around 1695	c. 500
1798	668
1816	1,066
1850	1,314
1900	3,699
1950	5,644
1960	8,715
1970	13,495
2000	15,929

== Points of interests ==
The world's tallest pylon of prefabricated concrete is pylon 301 of powerline Innertkirchen – Littau – Mettlen. The pylon, built in 1990, has a height of 59.5 meters (195 ft).

Pylon 301

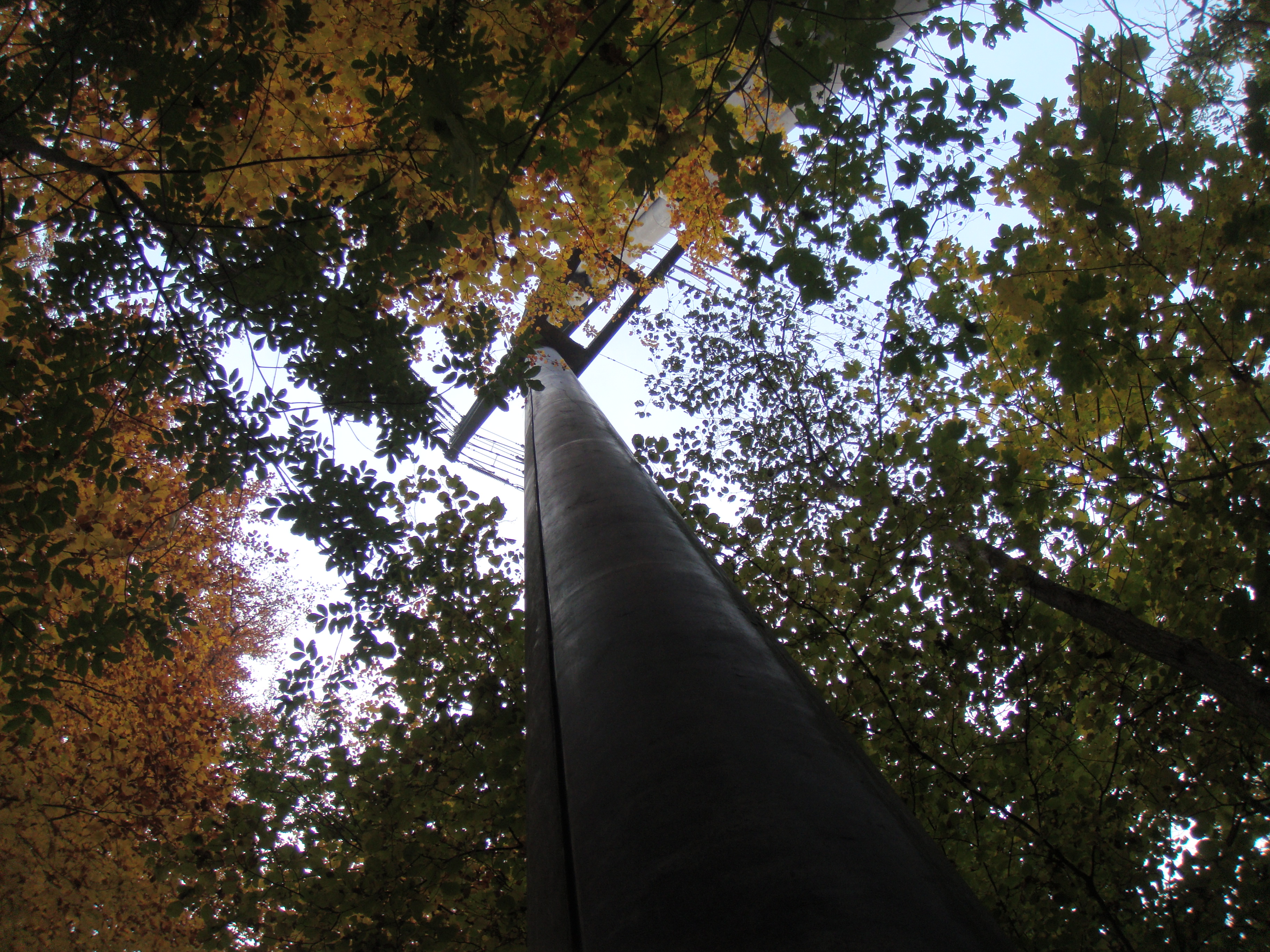

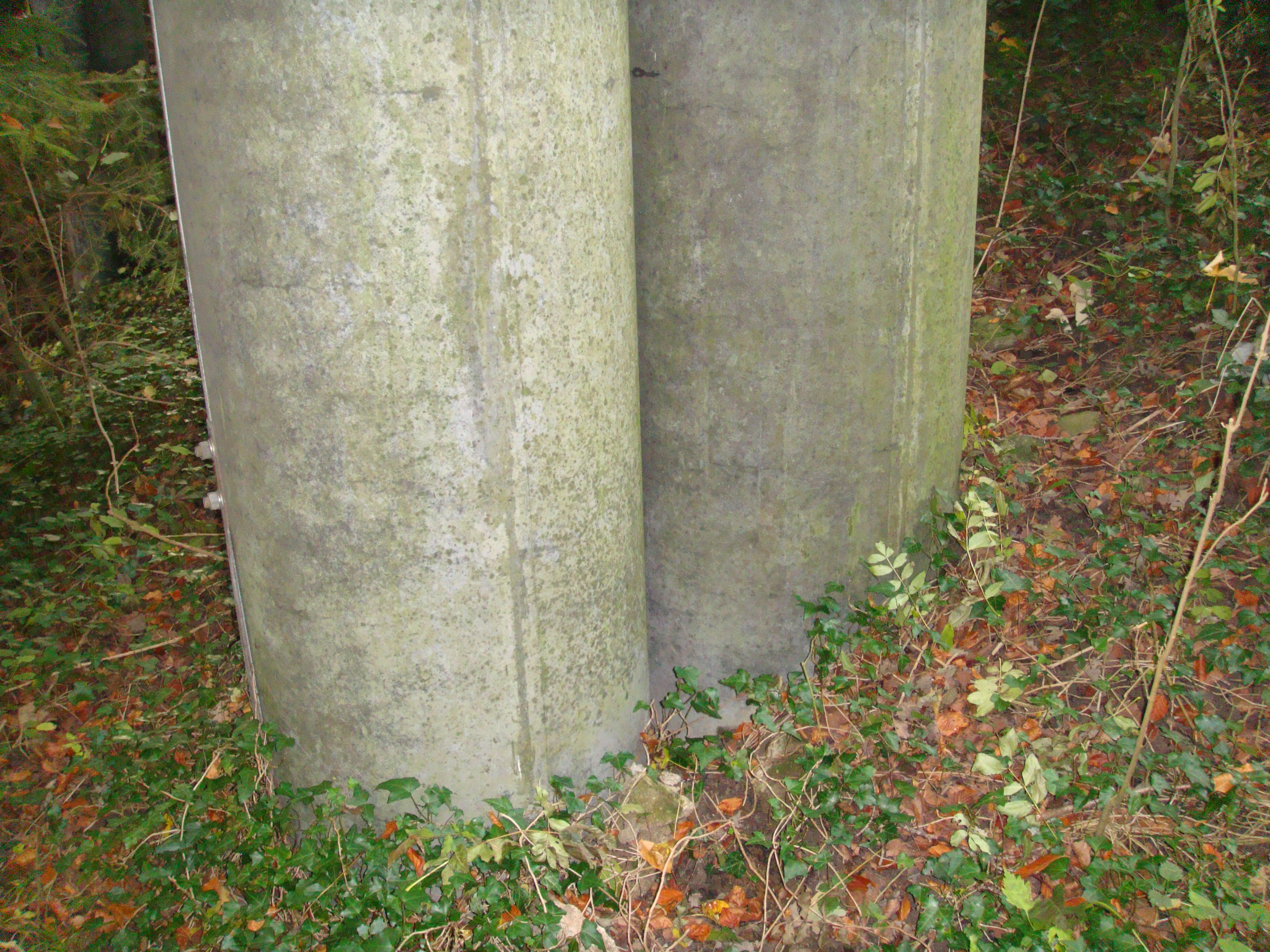

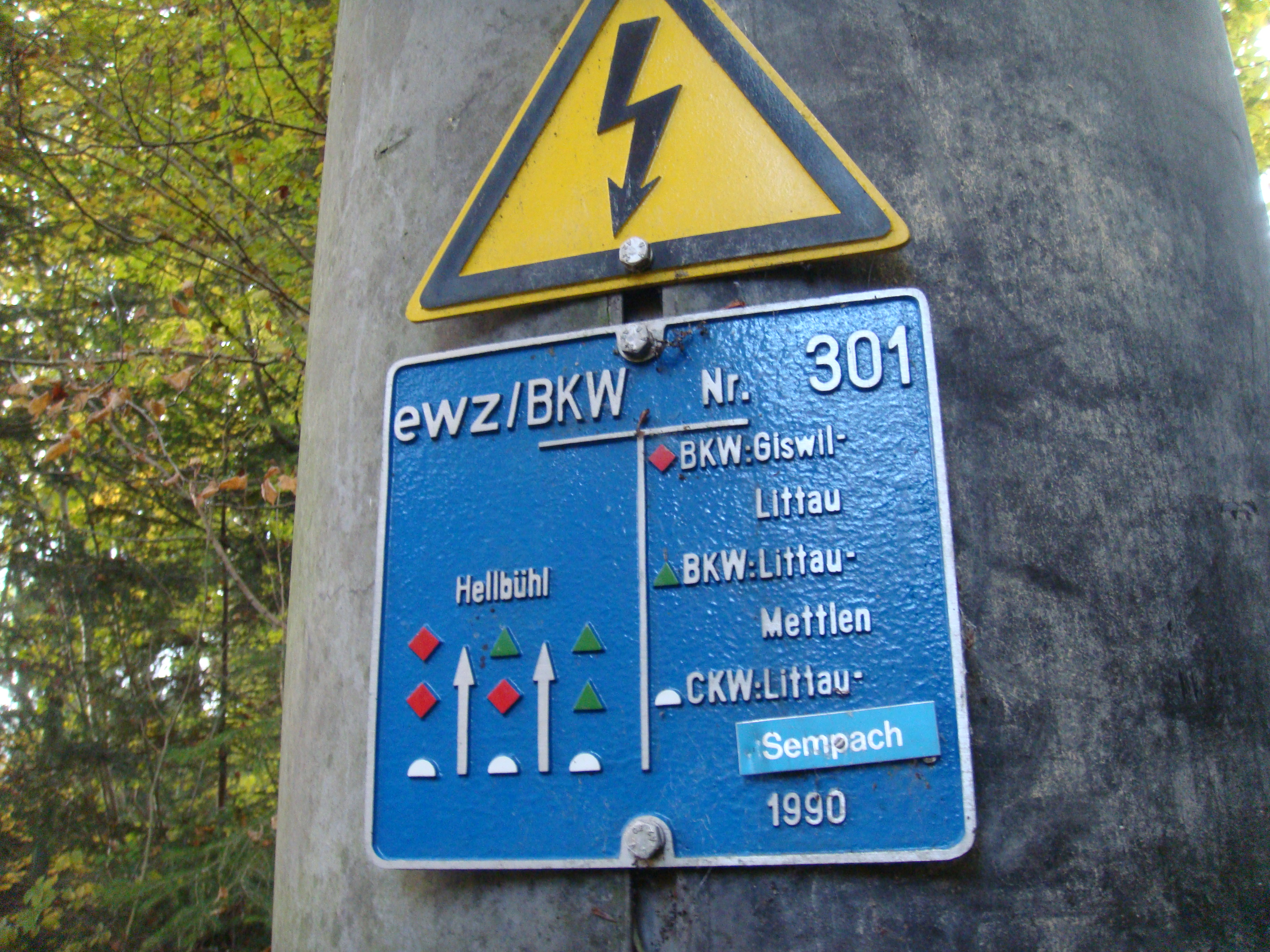
