= Root, Switzerland =

Root
- Municipality
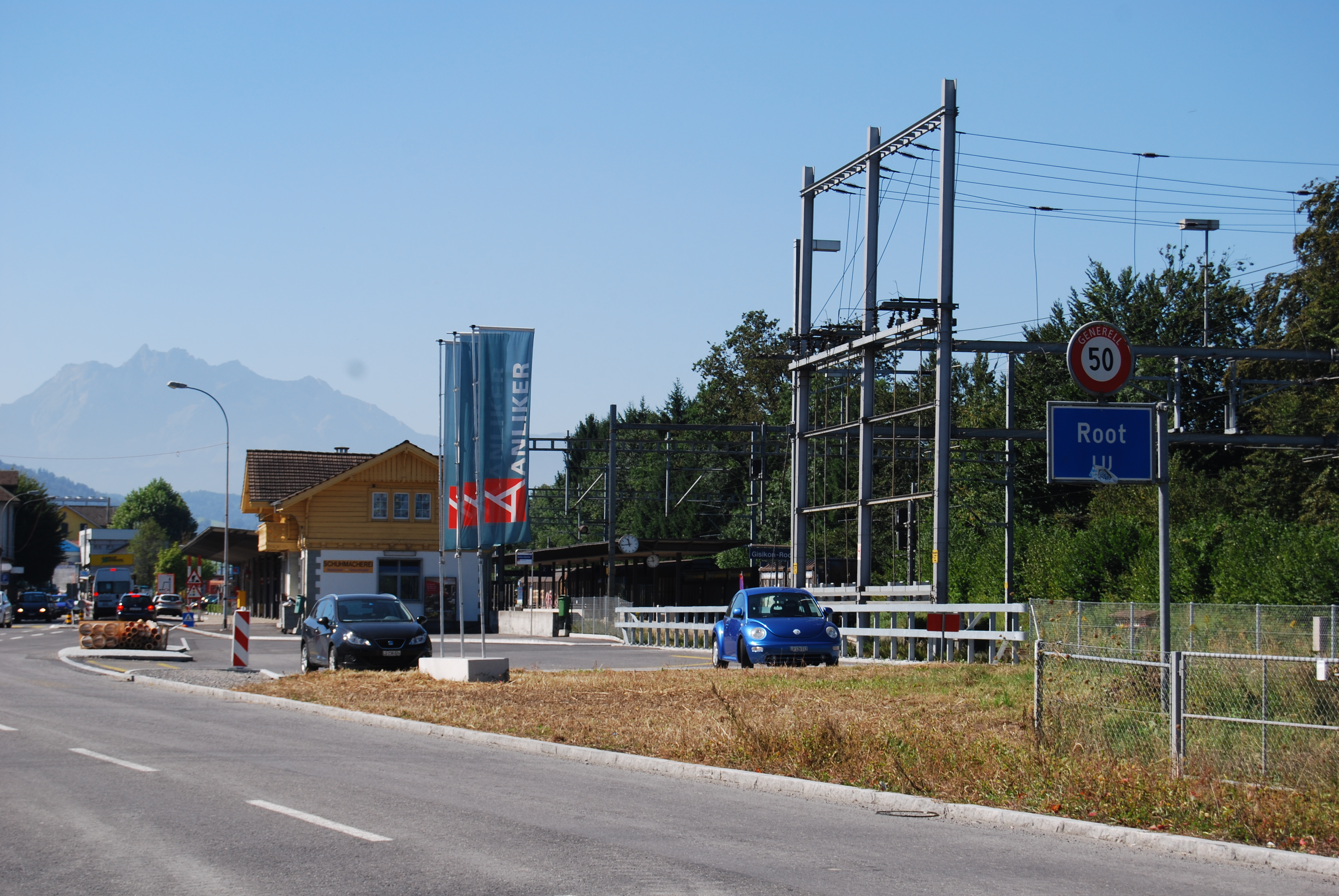

- Flag Coat of arms
- Location of Root
- Location within Switzerland Location within Canton of Lucerne
- Coordinates: 47°07′N 08°23′E postal_code = 6037 (Root), 6038 (Honau), 6039 (Root D4)
- Country: Switzerland
- Canton: Lucerne
- District: Lucerne

Area
  - Total: 9.90 km^{2} (3.82 sq mi)
- Elevation: 422 m (1,385 ft)
- Highest elevation (Rooterberg): 891 m (2,923 ft)
- Lowest elevation (Reuss): 404 m (1,325 ft)

Population (December 2024)
  - Total: 6,643
  - Density: 671/km^{2} (1,740/sq mi)
- Time zone: UTC+01:00 (CET)
  - Summer (DST): UTC+02:00 (CEST)
- SFOS number: 1065
- ISO 3166 code: CH-LU
- Localities: Honau (former municipality, merged 2025), Perlen (industrial area)
- Surrounded by: Buchrain, Dierikon, Dietwil (AG), Gisikon, Inwil, Meierskappel, Risch (ZG), Udligenswil
- Website: www.gemeinde-root.ch

Root (Swiss Standard German pronunciation: [ˈroːt]) is a municipality in the district of Lucerne in the canton of Lucerne in Switzerland. On 1 January 2025 the former municipality of Honau merged into Root.

== Geography ==
Aerial view (1953)

Root (including the former Honau) has an area of 9.90 km^{2} (3.82 sq mi) (official measurement including lakes; areal statistics approx. 9.88 km²). Of this area, agricultural land makes up about 45.4%, forested areas 26.4%, settlement 23.3%, and unproductive areas 4.9%. The municipality lies in the Rontal valley between Lucerne and Zug, on the right bank of the Reuss river. It includes the village of Root, the former municipality of Honau (now an Ortsteil), and parts of the Perlen industrial area. Key features include Michaelskreuz (a regional viewpoint) and the Rooterberg. The lowest point in the canton of Lucerne (approx. 404 m) is in the former Honau area.

== History ==
Root was first mentioned in 1236 as Rota. Honau merged into Root on 1 January 2025 following popular votes in March 2024 (83.7% approval in Root, 75.5% in Honau). The merger strengthens the municipality's capacity while preserving local identities.

== Demographics ==
As of 31 December 2024, Root has a permanent resident population of 6,643. The foreign national share is 28.2%. Population growth over the last 10 years has been 29.8%. Age distribution (approx.): 21.0% aged 0–19, 65.6% aged 20–64, 13.3% aged 65+. There are 2,827 private households, of which 30.5% are single-person households. Languages: The majority speak German; significant minorities include speakers of languages from former Yugoslavia, Albanian, and others (updated data reflects integration post-merger). Religion and other details have evolved with growth and the merger; the population is diverse with notable Catholic and Protestant communities plus Muslim residents.

== Economy ==
Root has a strong secondary and tertiary sector presence. In 2023, there were 5,690 employed persons (4,822 full-time equivalents), with approx. 0.9% in primary, 44.6% in secondary (including the Perlen paper mill, a major Swiss newsprint producer), and 54.4% in tertiary sectors. There are 486 workplaces. Unemployment averaged 70 persons in 2024. The municipality benefits from proximity to Lucerne and Zug, with good transport links (SBB stations Gisikon-Root and Root D4).

== Politics ==
In recent National Council elections (2023), the SVP was the strongest party, followed by others including SP, Mitte, FDP, and Greens.

== Infrastructure and Culture ==
Education: Kindergartens, primary and secondary schools; higher education in Lucerne. Notable sites: Church of St. Martin, Honau's St. Eligius chapel, Michaelskreuz. Recreation: Reuss river area, Hasliwald, Rontaler Höhenweg, sports facilities, Pumptrack/Skatepark. Ongoing projects: School expansions (e.g., Hagenmatt with triple sports hall).
