= Lucerne District =

Coordinates: 47°10′N 8°10′E

Lucerne District Amt Luzern
- District
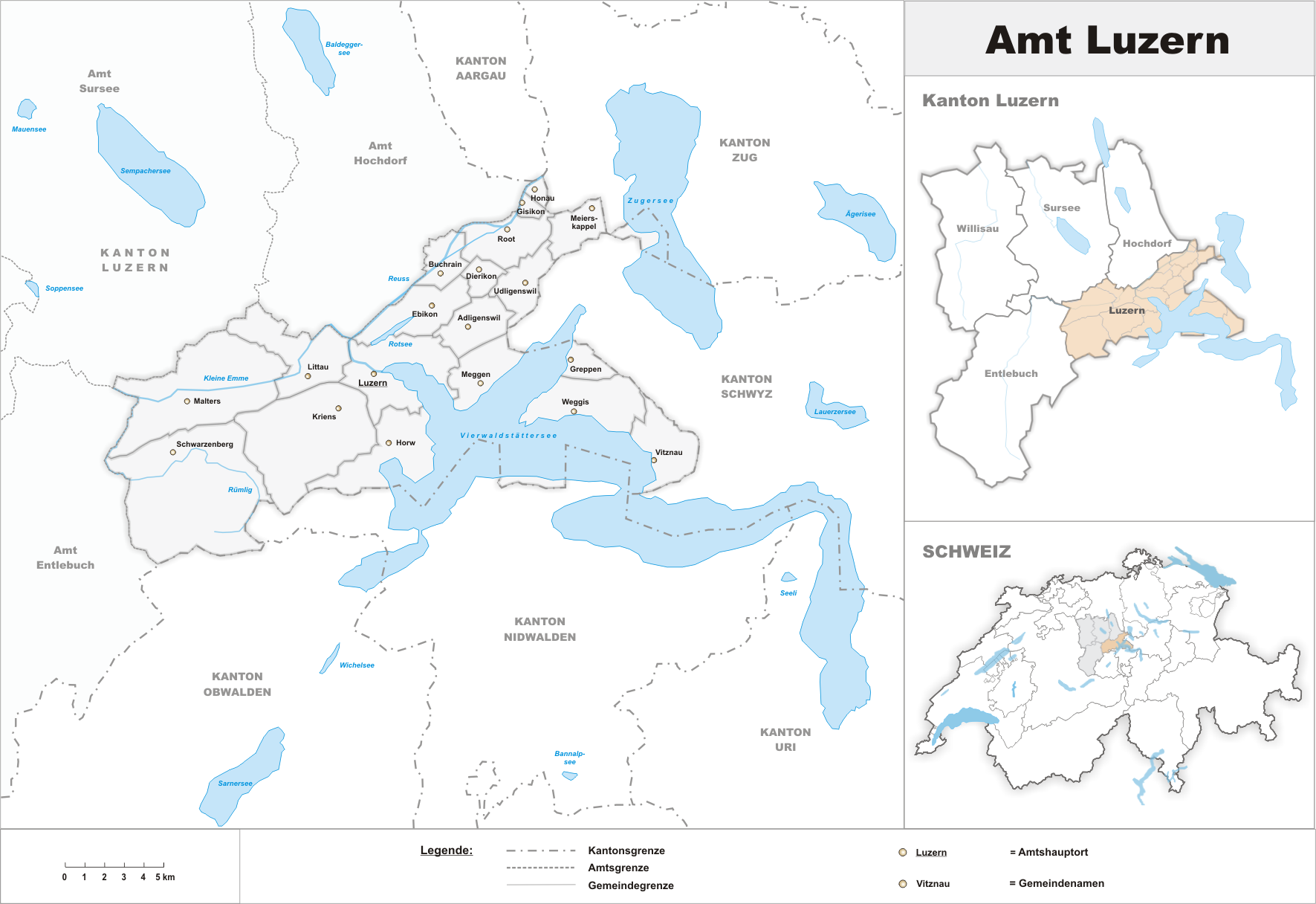
- Country: Switzerland
- Canton: Luzern
- Capital: Lucerne

Area
  - Total: 259.92 km^{2} (100.36 sq mi)

Population (2020)
  - Total: 176,710
  - Density: 679.86/km^{2} (1,760.8/sq mi)
- Time zone: UTC+1 (CET)
  - Summer (DST): UTC+2 (CEST)
- Municipalities: 17

Lucerne District (German: Luzern) is a former Amt (administrative district) of the Canton of Lucerne, Switzerland. It had a population of 176,710 (as of 2013) and consisted of 17 municipalities, of which the city of Lucerne is the largest and the district capital. On 1 January 2013 the Amt was divided into two Wahlkreis, Lucerne-Stadt and Lucerne-Land.

Municipalities	Population (31 December 2020)	Area (km^{2})
Adligenswil	5,471	6.99
Buchrain	6,400	4.80
Dierikon	1,579	2.78
Ebikon	14,066	9.69
Gisikon	1,421	1.08
Greppen	1,185	5.25
Horw	14,211	20.43
Kriens	28,245	27.31
Lucerne	82,620	29.04^{b}
Malters	7,410	28.57
Meggen	7,562	13.93
Meierskappel	1,477	9.23
Root	5,335	9.9
Schwarzenberg	1,738	39.31
Udligenswil	2,371	6.22
Vitznau	1,426	11.76
Weggis	4,440	25.29
District of Lucerne	176,710	259.92^{a}

^a 1992/97 survey gives a total area of 216.65 km^{2} (83.65 sq mi) without including certain large lakes, while the 2000 survey includes lakes and gives the higher value.
^b Includes the area of Littau which merged into Luzern on 1 January 2010.

== Mergers ==
- On 1 January 2010 the municipality of Littau merged into the municipality of Lucerne.
- On 1 January 2025 the former municipality of Honau merged into the municipality of Root.
