= Bolette Sutermeister Petri =

Danish-Swiss writer

Bolette-Merete Sutermeister Petri (October 23, 1920 – 2018) was a Danish-Swiss writer of travel literature, considered as ″expert for the High North".

== Biography ==
Petri Sutermeister was born in October 1920 in Kriens, Switzerland. Her mother was Danish and her father was the owner of a pasta producer in Lucerne; she spent her first eight years of life in the ″villa Bleiche″ in Kriens; then she lived with her family in Lucerne; In 1935 she moved with her mother after her divorce to Copenhagen. At sixteen, she first traveled to Spitsbergen.

She worked as a translator in Copenhagen and made archeological studies and expeditions to Greenland, Lapland and Spitsbergen. In Longyearbyen, she created in the former coal mine of John Munro Longyear a museum ″with facts about Svalbard″. Until 1992, she spent each summer, from May to September in Spitsbergen.

Petri Sutermeister's books consist of stories that usually contain a trip /travel, for example, in a train or on a plane, containing and focus on landscape descriptions. Her most famous work is Eisblumen: Encounters on Spitsbergen. She died in 2018 at the age of 97.
