= Kriens =

- Municipality
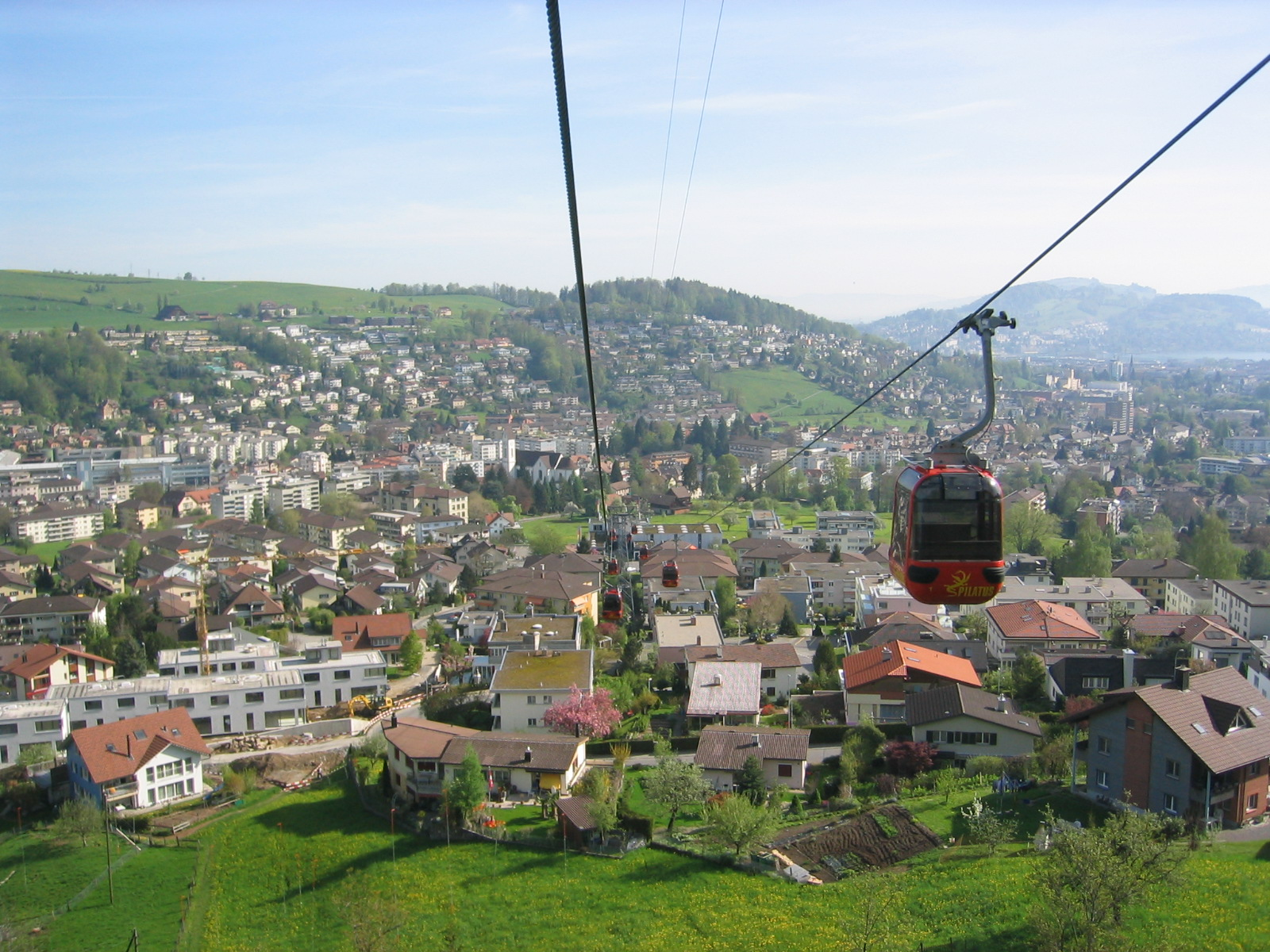

- Flag Coat of arms
- Location of Kriens
- Location within Switzerland Location within Canton of Lucerne
- Coordinates: 47°02′N 08°17′E
- Country: Switzerland
- Canton: Lucerne
- District: Lucerne

Government
  - Executive: Stadtrat with 5 members
  - Mayor: Stadtpräsidentin; Christine Kaufmann-Wolf CVP/PDC (as of 2020)
  - Parliament: Einwohnerrat with 36 members

Area
  - Total: 27.31 km^{2} (10.54 sq mi)
- Elevation: 490 m (1,610 ft)

Population (December 2020)
  - Total: 28,245
  - Density: 1,034/km^{2} (2,679/sq mi)
- Time zone: UTC+01:00 (CET)
  - Summer (DST): UTC+02:00 (CEST)
- Postal code: 6010-6012
- SFOS number: 1059
- ISO 3166 code: CH-LU
- Surrounded by: Hergiswil (NW), Horw, Lucerne (Luzern), Malters, Schwarzenberg
- Twin towns: San Damiano d'Asti (Italy)
- Website: www.kriens.ch

Kriens is a town and a municipality in the district of Lucerne in the canton of Lucerne in Switzerland.

The municipality lies at the foot of the mountain Pilatus, and is a western suburb of Lucerne.

== History ==
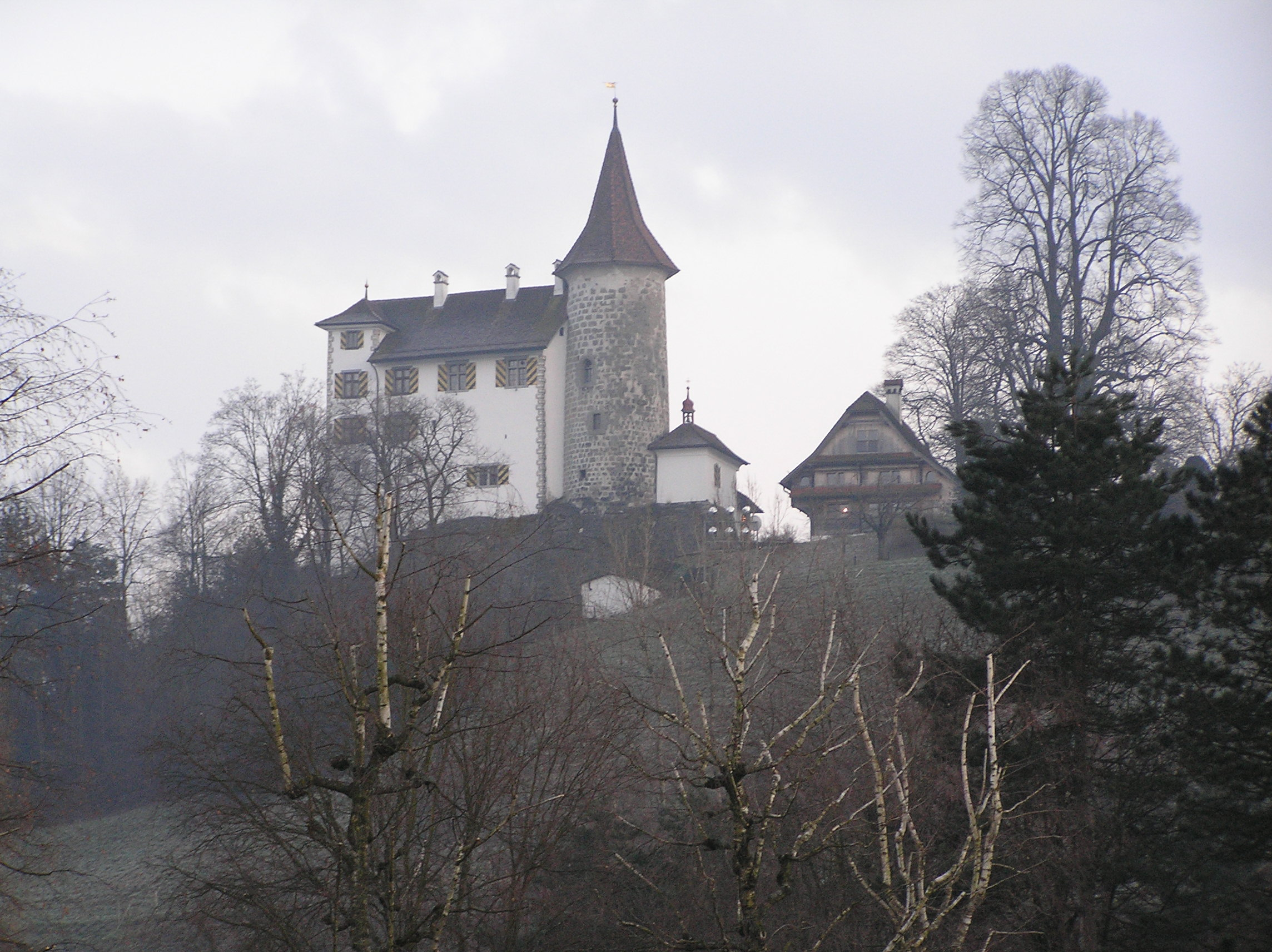
Schloss Schauensee in Kriens

In the oldest documents of the Benedictine Monastery of Lucerne, Chrientes is specified as one of their 16 properties. Chrientes specified an area between Mt. Pilatus and the Lake of Lucerne. The monastery received the area as a present from two noble sisters. This document dates from about 840 AD. The Habsburgs acquired the municipality in 1291. It remained in their possession as part of the District of Rothenburg until the Battle of Sempach. The city of Lucerne took over in 1392. Kriens, along with Horw and Eigenthal, belonged to the Vogtei of Horw-Kriens from 1421 until 1798. In 1653 the local peasants revolted under the leadership of Hans Spengler. It was a part of the District of Lucerne until 1803, and has belonged to the Authority of Lucerne ever since.

== Geography ==
Aerial view (1949)

The City of Kriens consists of the formerly rural and industrial but now urbanized town of Kriens with its diverse districts, the community of Obernau to the west, the hamlet of Hergiswald – located 5 km west of the town on the road to Eigenthal – and numerous independent farmsteads on the slopes of Mount Pilatus.

The border in the east, with the neighboring community of Lucerne, goes across the property of a large brewery. From there it runs in a north-westerly direction through the Gigeliwald and runs to the west of the Lucerne district of Obergütsch and the Gütschwald to the Böschenhof farmstead. From there it runs to the south-west up the slopes of Mount Sonnenberg and Mount Blettenberg to the Gspan farmstead. It turns thence to the south-east, separating the hamlet of Holderchäppeli (elev. 935 m (3,068 ft)), running over Mount Würzenegg (elev. 1,146 m (3,760 ft)), Mount Chraigütsch (elev. 1,081 m (3,547 ft)) and Mount Höchberg (elev. 1,162 m (3,812 ft)) on its way to Mount Lauelenegg (elev. 1,442 m (4,731 ft)) northwest of Pilatus. Thence the municipal border leads to the north-east over Mount Fräkmüntegg (elev. 1,469 m (4,820 ft)), and Mount Biele (elev. 1,373 m (4,505 ft)) to the Hochwald. From there the border leads to Steinibach and shortly thereafter, nearly to the train station in Horw. From there it follows the (partially former) train track toward Lucerne in a north-easterly direction back to the property of the brewery.

The eastern part of Kriens (the districts near the city and near Horw) lie in a valley. From Kupferhammer the land gently rises to the west, toward Obernau (elevation difference between Kupferhammer and Obernau less than 90 m (300 ft) ).

To the north of the town is the small, forested southern slope of Mount Sonnenberg. The slope to the south of town is the northern side of Mount Schattenberg.

The Schattenberg is the first rise of Mount Pilatus. The lower part is cleared and partially developed, however the majority of the land west of Obernau and south of town is forest. West of the line connecting Krienseregg and Fräkmüntegg there is a large, flat swamp, from which is the starting point of many brooks (including Tschuggenbach, Weissbach, Rotbach, and Renggbach). The whole area forms part of the north slope of Pilatus.

Of importance is the stream the Unterer Krienbach, which often caused floods before it was covered. It flows through the town and empties into the Reuss in Lucerne. The Schlundbach and the previously mentioned Steinibach flow in the direction of Horw and onward into Lake Lucerne.

Kriens has an area of 27.3 km^{2} (10.5 sq mi). Of this area, 31.6% is used for agricultural purposes, while 50.5% is forested. Of the rest of the land, 16.9% is settled (buildings or roads) and the remainder (1%) is non-productive (rivers, glaciers or mountains). In the 1997 land survey, 50.51% of the total land area was forested. Of the agricultural land, 29.63% is used for farming or pastures, while 1.98% is used for orchards or vine crops. Of the settled areas, 8.81% is covered with buildings, 2.23% is industrial, 0.84% is classed as special developments, 1.1% is parks or greenbelts and 3.88% is transportation infrastructure. Of the unproductive areas, 0.07% is unproductive standing water (ponds or lakes), 0.33% is unproductive flowing water (rivers) and 0.62% is other unproductive land.

It consists of Kriens and since 1845 Hergiswald. The Eigental belonged to Kriens parish until 1832. It was also part of Kriens during the Middle Ages and from 1814 to 1845.

== Neighboring municipalities ==
Kriens borders on Hergiswil to the south, on Horw to the south and east, on the City of Lucerne to the east, the former municipality Littau (now part of the City of Lucerne) to the north, on Malters to the north-west, and on Schwarzenberg to the west.

== Population ==
Kriens has a population (as of 31 December 2020) of 28,245. As of 2007, 15.8% of the population was made up of foreign nationals. Over the last 10 years the population has grown at a rate of 6.3%.

The age distribution in Kriens is: 5,438 people (21% 0–19 years old), 6,412 people (24.8% are 20–39 years old), 9,199 people (35.5% are 40–64 years old). The senior population distribution is 3,675 people (14.2% are 65–79 years old), 997 (3.9% are 80–89 years old) and 167 people (0.6% of the population are 90+ years old).

=== Population growth ===
The population of Kriens has grown constantly since 1798. There were only three short periods of stagnation, the first from 1837 to 1850, the second 1910-1920 and the third 1970–1980. Particularly large increases occurred between 1888 and 1910 and between 1930 and 1970. Kriens celebrated a population of 10,000 in 1951; it reached 20,000 by 1970. Today Kriens is the third largest municipality in canton Lucerne, and one of the 25-biggest cities and municipalities in Switzerland. As per 1st Januar 2019, Kriens is officially called City of Kriens (Stadt Kriens).

The historical population is given in the following table:

| year | population |
|---|---|
| 1456 | c. 400 |
| 1695 | c. 1,280 |
| 1798 | 1,956 |
| 1837 | 2,663 |
| 1850 | 2,693 |
| 1888 | 4,319 |
| 1900 | 5,951 |
| 1910 | 7,157 |
| 1920 | 7,247 |
| 1930 | 7,424 |
| 1950 | 9,821 |
| 1960 | 14,029 |
| 1970 | 20,409 |
| 1980 | 21,097 |
| 1990 | 23,079 |
| 2000 | 24,742 |
| 2004 | 25,190 |
| 2010 | 26,324 |
| 2015 | 27,056 |
| 2018 | 27,444 |

=== Housing ===
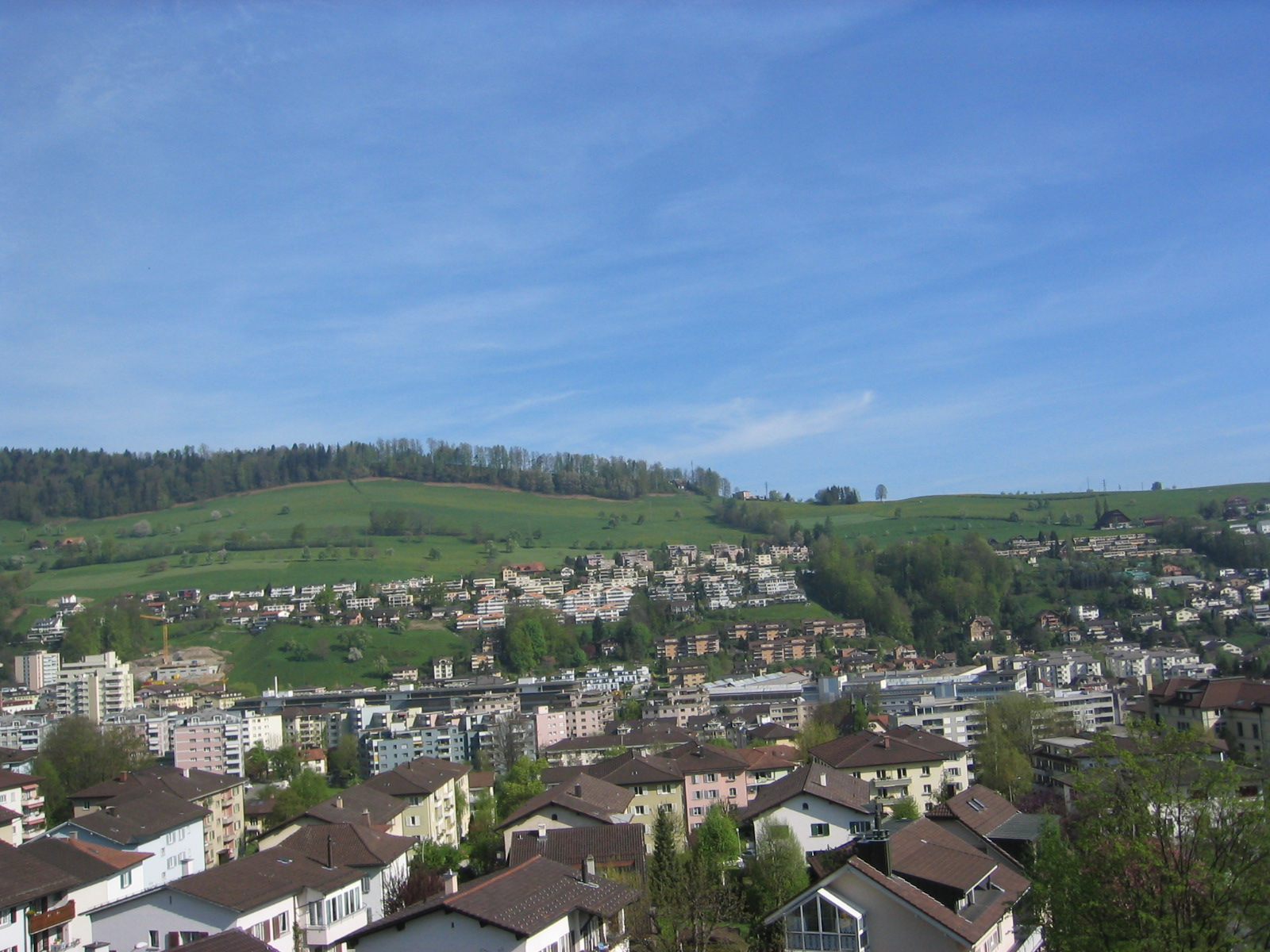
Kriens from the Pilatus Aerial Cableway

As of 2000 there are 10,830 households, of which 3,760 households (or about 34.7%) contain only a single individual. 573 or about 5.3% are large households, with at least five members. As of 2000 there were 2,941 inhabited buildings in the municipality, of which 2,532 were built only as housing, and 409 were mixed use buildings. There were 1,341 single family homes, 275 double family homes, and 916 multi-family homes in the municipality. Most homes were either two (918) or three (906) story structures. There were only 114 single story buildings and 594 four or more story buildings.

=== Languages ===
The population speaks a dialect of High Alemannic German. At the time of the last census in 2000, 89.36% responded that their main language was German, 2.55% Italian, and 1.92% Serbian.

=== Religions denominations ===
The population was formerly dominated by the Catholic church, though today it is still the largest Christian denomination in Kriens, other have immigrated from other parts of Switzerland and abroad changing the demographics of the town's population.

As of 2000, the religious demography was as follows:

Population by religion (Census)
| Denomination | Percentage |
|---|---|
| Roman Catholic | 66.79% |
| Protestant | 15.82% |
| Atheist | 7.44% |
| Muslim | 3.28% |
| Orthodox Christians | 2.22% |
| Believers of other non-Christian faiths | 0.76% |
| Jewish | 0.57% |
| Old Catholic | 0.19% |
| No Answer | 2.78% |

The majority of the Muslims are Albanian and Bosnian, along with some other nationalities. The Orthodox Christians are mostly Serbians and Montenegrins. The Jews are generally members of the (orthodox) Hasidic branch of Judaism, and Swiss in nationality.

=== Origin-nationality ===
Of the 25,190 inhabitants at the end of 2004, 21,409 were Swiss, and 3,781 (or about 15%) were foreigners. At the time of the last census, in 2000, 80.46% were Swiss citizens (85.30% including dual citizens). In contrast to the other large municipalities in Lucerne, there are no communities with a foreign immigrant majority in Kriens.

Population by nationality (Census)
| Nationality | Number not including dual citizens | Number including dual citizens |
|---|---|---|
| Switzerland | 19'907 | 21'105 |
| Italy | 724 | 1'158 |
| Serbia-Montenegro | 928 | 994 |
| Germany | 293 | 403 |
| Sri Lanka | 228 | 264 |
| Spain | 197 | 244 |
| Bosnia-Herzegovina | 221 | 234 |
| Macedonia | 161 | 171 |
| Portugal | 148 | 158 |
| Croatia | 135 | 146 |
| Austria | 93 | 134 |
| Turkey | 86 | 103 |

== Economy ==
Two-thirds of the jobs are in the service sector. Kriens offers 12,120 jobs in 958 work places. Kriens has an unemployment rate of 2.53%. As of 2005, there were 155 people employed in the primary economic sector and about 59 businesses involved in this sector. 2051 people are employed in the secondary sector and there are 200 businesses in this sector. 6629 people are employed in the tertiary sector, with 657 businesses in this sector. As of 2000 51.2% of the population of the municipality were employed in some capacity. At the same time, females made up 45% of the workforce.

== Transportation ==
Kriens was formerly accessible by train. The Kriens-Lucerne-Railways (Kriens-Luzern-Bahn KLB) handled passenger traffic from 1886 to 1900. Until 1998 the tracks were used for freight services from Lucerne to Kriens. As the tracks were laid in the road, they were in the way and were finally removed 2004, when the town centre was redeveloped. But the same year, passenger rail service was restored to Kriens. The Kriens-Mattenhof station opened on the rail line between Lucerne and Interlaken/Engelberg in December 2004. It is served by the S4, S5 and in the rush hour by the S41 of the Zentralbahn. However, the station is closer to Horw and parts of Lucerne than to the city centre of Kriens.

Despite this, Kriens has an outstanding public transportation system. Line 1 of the VBL bus company goes from Lucerne to Kriens-Obernau via the town center and Line 5 connects Kriens directly to Emmenbrücke, not serving the city centre of Lucerne. Lines 15 and 16 make other communities of Kriens accessible by public transportation. In 2005, Line 16 was extended to the train station in Horw. Additionally, the bus lines 14 and 21 go from Lucerne to Kriens, partially via Horw. The bus line 214 connects Kriens to Littau and Malters. The Kriens–Sonnenberg funicular links Kriens with the hiking and recreational area of the Sonnenberg.

Kriens has its own exit on the A2 motorway near Grosshof, south of the Mount Sonnenberg tunnel. However, the exit Lucerne-Horw, in Schlund, also on the A2, is more convenient for inhabitants in some parts of Kriens.

== Politics ==
In the 2007 election the most popular party was the SVP which received 28.1% of the vote. The next three most popular parties were the CVP (20.2%), the FDP (20%) and the SPS (17.1%).

== Twin towns – sister cities ==
Kriens is twinned with:

- San Damiano d'Asti, Italy

== Community name ==
Neither the origin nor the meaning of Kriens is clearly ascertainable. It probably comes from the Indo-Germanic word (s)keri, that meant something like "separate" (4th century AD). It was then probably transferred into the Celtic Crientas. In a 9th-century document the Alemannic word Chrientes is mentioned.

== Schools ==
There are twelve primary and three secondary schools in Kriens.

In Kriens about 74.2% of the population (between age 25–64) have completed either non-mandatory upper secondary education or additional higher education (either university or a Fachhochschule).

== Sport ==
The best-known sports club in the city is the SC Kriens football club, which competed in the Swiss National League A for a time. Since the 18/19 season, the club has played in the second highest Swiss league, the Challenge League. In handball, HC Kriens-Luzern plays in the National League A and thus belongs to the extended national top. There are also other clubs, such as the bicycle club, the tennis club and several gymnastics clubs.

== Notable people ==
- Petri Sutermeister (1920-2018) a Danish-Swiss writer of travel literature, she spent each summer in Spitsbergen
- Yvette Estermann (born 1967) a politician and member of the Swiss National Council
- Jean Nuttli (born 1974) a former cyclist
- Fabio Coltorti (born 1980) a former footballer who played as a goalkeeper, 360 club caps and 8 for Switzerland
- Michael Töngi (born 1967), a politician and member of the Swiss National Council since 2018
