= Malters =

- Municipality
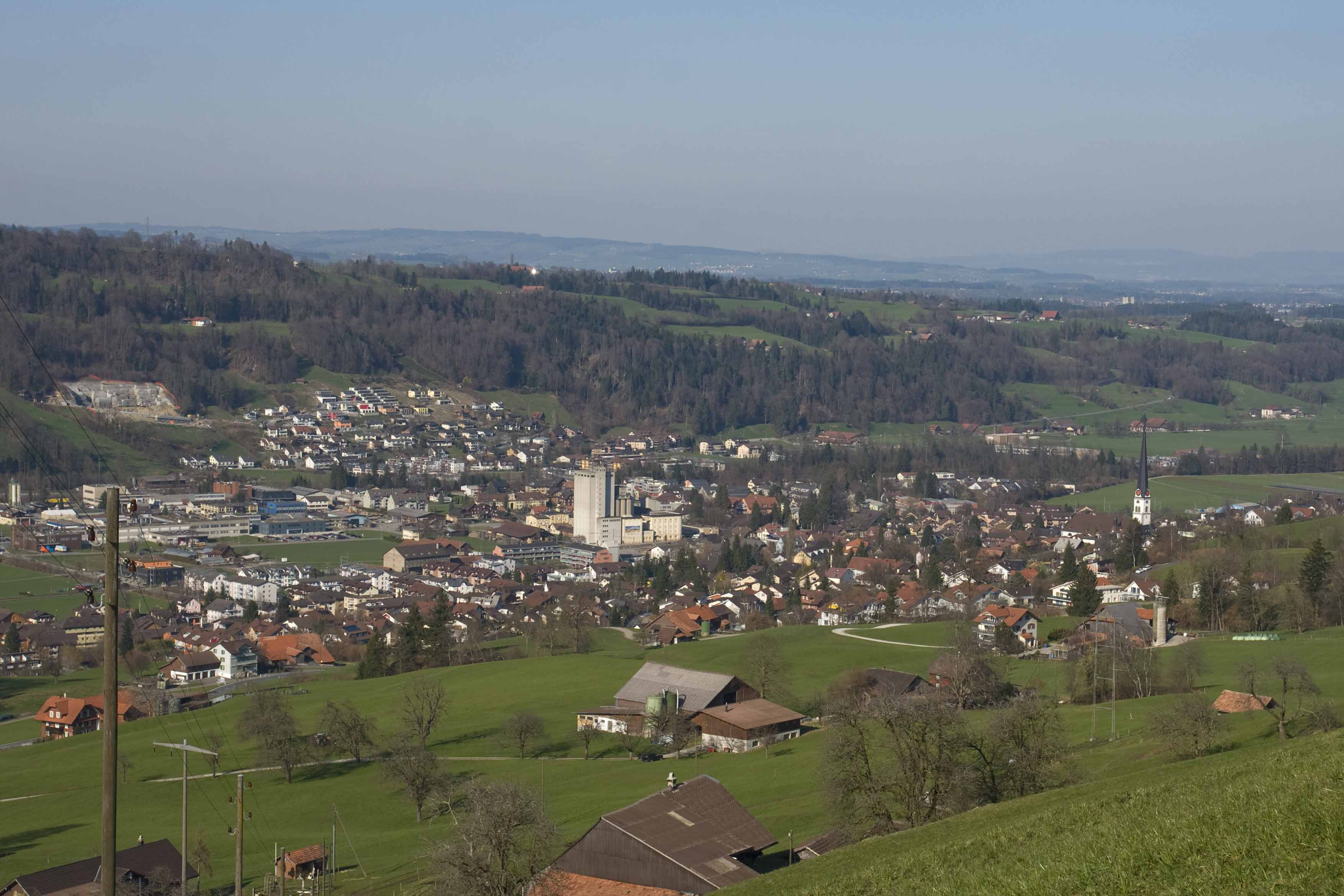

- Coat of arms
- Location of Malters
- Location within Switzerland Location within Canton of Lucerne
- Coordinates: 47°2′N 8°11′E
- Country: Switzerland
- Canton: Lucerne
- District: Lucerne

Government
  - Mayor: Sibylle Boos-Braun

Area
  - Total: 28.57 km^{2} (11.03 sq mi)
- Elevation: 512 m (1,680 ft)

Population (December 2020)
  - Total: 7,410
  - Density: 259/km^{2} (672/sq mi)
- Time zone: UTC+01:00 (CET)
  - Summer (DST): UTC+02:00 (CEST)
- Postal code: 6102
- SFOS number: 1062
- ISO 3166 code: CH-LU
- Surrounded by: Entlebuch, Kriens, Lucerne, Neuenkirch, Ruswil, Schwarzenberg, Werthenstein
- Website: www.malters.ch

Malters (Swiss Standard German pronunciation: [ˈmaltərs]) is a municipality in the district of Lucerne in the canton of Lucerne in Switzerland.

== History ==
Malters is first mentioned in second half of the 9th Century as in Maltrensi marcha. In 1238 it was mentioned as villa Malters.

== Geography ==
Aerial view from 400 m by Walter Mittelholzer (1922)

Malters has an area of 28.6 km^{2} (11.0 sq mi). Of this area, 64.7% is used for agricultural purposes, while 24.5% is forested. Of the rest of the land, 9.5% is settled (buildings or roads) and the remainder (1.2%) is non-productive (rivers, glaciers or mountains). In the 1997 land survey, 24.54% of the total land area was forested. Of the agricultural land, 60.55% is used for farming or pastures, while 4.17% is used for orchards or vine crops. Of the settled areas, 4.73% is covered with buildings, 0.88% is industrial, 0.39% is classed as special developments, 0.25% is parks or greenbelts and 3.29% is transportation infrastructure. Of the unproductive areas, 0.04% is unproductive standing water (ponds or lakes), 1.12% is unproductive flowing water (rivers) and 0.07% is other unproductive land.

The municipality is located about 10 km (6.2 mi) from Lucerne along both sides of the Kleine Emme river. It consists of the village of Malters and, until 1845, the now independent municipality of Schwarzenberg.

== Demographics ==
Malters has a population (as of 31 December 2020) of 7,410. As of 2007, 8.8% of the population was made up of foreign nationals. Over the last 10 years the population has grown at a rate of 3.4%. Most of the population (as of 2000) speaks German (93.2%), with Albanian being second most common (2.8%) and Serbo-Croatian being third (0.8%).

In the 2007 election the most popular party was the FDP which received 30.9% of the vote. The next three most popular parties were the CVP (27.4%), the SVP (24.3%) and the SPS (8%).

The age distribution in Malters is; 1,707 people or 26.6% of the population is 0–19 years old. 1,707 people or 26.6% are 20–39 years old, and 2,111 people or 32.9% are 40–64 years old. The senior population distribution is 651 people or 10.1% are 65–79 years old, 207 or 3.2% are 80–89 years old and 34 people or 0.5% of the population are 90+ years old.

The entire Swiss population is generally well educated. In Malters about 69.2% of the population (between age 25-64) have completed either non-mandatory upper secondary education or additional higher education (either university or a Fachhochschule).

As of 2000 there are 2,197 households, of which 615 households (or about 28.0%) contain only a single individual. 307 or about 14.% are large households, with at least five members. As of 2000 there were 997 inhabited buildings in the municipality, of which 700 were built only as housing, and 297 were mixed use buildings. There were 407 single family homes, 138 double family homes, and 155 multi-family homes in the municipality. Most homes were either two (353) or three (226) story structures. There were only 31 single story buildings and 90 four or more story buildings.

Malters has an unemployment rate of 1.25%. As of 2005, there were 427 people employed in the primary economic sector and about 141 businesses involved in this sector. 1106 people are employed in the secondary sector and there are 79 businesses in this sector. 1115 people are employed in the tertiary sector, with 141 businesses in this sector. As of 2000 49.5% of the population of the municipality were employed in some capacity. At the same time, females made up 39.7% of the workforce.

In the 2000 census the religious membership of Malters was; 4,651 (75.9%) were Roman Catholic, and 584 (9.5%) were Protestant, with an additional 63 (1.03%) that were of some other Christian faith. There are 4 individuals (0.07% of the population) who are Jewish. There are 235 individuals (3.84% of the population) who are Muslim. Of the rest; there were 62 (1.01%) individuals who belong to another religion, 305 (4.98%) who do not belong to any organized religion, 223 (3.64%) who did not answer the question.

The historical population is given in the following graph:
