= Honau, Switzerland =

Honau
- Former municipality
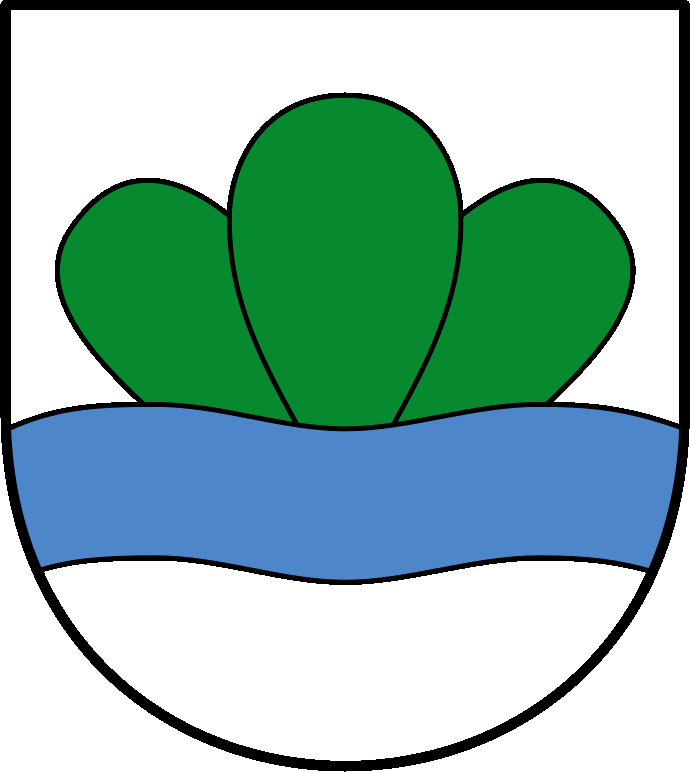
- Coat of arms
- Location of Honau
- Location within Switzerland Location within Canton of Lucerne
- Coordinates: 47°8′N 8°24′E
- Country: Switzerland
- Canton: Lucerne
- District: Lucerne

Area
  - Total: 1.25 km^{2} (0.48 sq mi)
- Elevation: 445 m (1,460 ft)

Population (December 2007)
  - Total: 357
  - Density: 286/km^{2} (740/sq mi)
- Time zone: UTC+01:00 (CET)
  - Summer (DST): UTC+02:00 (CEST)
- Postal code: 6038
- SFOS number: 1057
- ISO 3166 code: CH-LU
- Surrounded by: Dietwil (AG), Gisikon, Inwil, Risch (ZG), Root
- Website: Profile (in German), SFSO statistics

Honau (German pronunciation: [ˈhoːnaʊ]) is a former municipality in the district of Lucerne in the canton of Lucerne in Switzerland. On 1 January 2025 the former municipality of Honau merged into the municipality of Root.

== History ==
Honau is first mentioned in 1344 as Honowa.

== Geography ==
Honau has an area of 1.3 km^{2} (0.50 sq mi). Of this area, 68.8% is used for agricultural purposes, while 19.2% is forested. Of the rest of the land, 9.6% is settled (buildings or roads) and the remainder (2.4%) is non-productive (rivers, glaciers or mountains). In the 1997 land survey, 19.2% of the total land area was forested. Of the agricultural land, 65.6% is used for farming or pastures, while 3.2% is used for orchards or vine crops. Of the settled areas, 4% is covered with buildings, 1.6% is classed as special developments, and 4% is transportation infrastructure. All the unproductive areas are classed as flowing water (rivers).

The municipality is located between the Reuss river and the Rooterberg mountain (798 m (2,618 ft)).

== Demographics ==
Honau has a population (as of 2007) of 357, of which 10.4% are foreign nationals. Over the last 10 years the population has grown at a rate of 24.8%. Most of the population (as of 2000) speaks German (94.1%), with Albanian being second most common ( 3.8%) and Portuguese being third ( 0.9%).

In the 2007 election the most popular party was the SVP which received 40.9% of the vote. The next three most popular parties were the CVP (25.9%), the FDP (13.6%) and the Green Party (9.5%).

The age distribution in Honau is; 111 people or 31.2% of the population is 0–19 years old. 69 people or 19.4% are 20–39 years old, and 158 people or 44.4% are 40–64 years old. The senior population distribution is 13 people or 3.7% are 65–79 years old, 5 or 1.4% are 80–89 years old and no one is over 90 years old.

The entire Swiss population is generally well educated. In Honau about 76.4% of the population (between age 25-64) have completed either non-mandatory upper secondary education or additional higher education (either university or a Fachhochschule).

As of 2000 there are 104 households, of which 19 households (or about 18.3%) contain only a single individual. 23 or about 22.1% are large households, with at least five members. As of 2000 there were 84 inhabited buildings in the municipality, of which 73 were built only as housing, and 11 were mixed use buildings. There were 61 single family homes, 8 double family homes, and 4 multi-family homes in the municipality. Most homes were either two (35) or three (35) story structures. There were only 2 single story buildings and 1 four or more story buildings.

Honau has an unemployment rate of 1.49%. As of 2005, there were 22 people employed in the primary economic sector and about 8 businesses involved in this sector. 2 people are employed in the secondary sector and there are 1 businesses in this sector. 67 people are employed in the tertiary sector, with 9 businesses in this sector. As of 2000 52.8% of the population of the municipality were employed in some capacity. At the same time, females made up 36.7% of the workforce.

In the 2000 census the religious membership of Honau was; 193 (60.3%) were Roman Catholic, and 66 (20.6%) were Protestant, with an additional 2 (0.63%) that were of some other Christian faith. There are 17 individuals (5.31% of the population) who are Muslim. Of the rest; there were 1 (0.31%) individuals who belong to another religion, 32 (10.%) who do not belong to any organized religion, 9 (2.81%) who did not answer the question.

The historical population is given in the following table:

year	population
1798	81
1850	120
1900	127
1950	120
1970	84
1990	200
