= Canton of Lucerne =

Canton of Switzerland

Canton of Lucerne Kanton Luzern (German)
- Canton
- Flag Coat of arms Logo
- Interactive map of Canton of Lucerne
- Coordinates: 47°5′N 8°7′E
- Capital: Lucerne
- Subdivisions: 79 municipalities

Government
  - President: Reto Wyss
  - Executive: Regierungsrat (5)
  - Legislative: Kantonsrat (120)

Area
  - Total: 1,493.51 km^{2} (576.65 sq mi)

Population (December 2020)
  - Total: 416,347
  - Density: 278.771/km^{2} (722.013/sq mi)

GDP
  - Total: CHF 28.176 billion (2020)
  - Per capita: CHF 67,936 (2020)
- ISO 3166 code: CH-LU
- Highest point: 2,350 m (7,710 ft): Brienzer Rothorn
- Lowest point: 406 m (1,332 ft): Reuss plain at Honauer Schachen
- Joined: 1332
- Languages: German
- Website: www.lu.ch

The canton of Lucerne is a canton of Switzerland. It is located in the country's central, German-speaking part. The population of the canton (as of 31 December 2020) is 416,347. As of 2007, the population included 57,268 foreigners, or about 15.8% of the total population. The cantonal capital is the city of Lucerne.

== History ==
The canton of Lucerne comprises territories acquired by its capital Lucerne, either by treaty, armed occupation or purchase. The first town acquired was Weggis (in 1380), Rothenburg, Kriens, Horw, Sempach and Hochdorf (all in 1394), Wolhusen and Entlebuch (1405), the so-called "Habsburger region" to the northeast of the town of Lucerne (1406), Willisau (1407), Sursee and Beromünster (1415), Malters (1477) and Littau (1481), while in 1803, in exchange for Hitzkirch, Merenschwand (held since 1397) was given up.

=== Prehistory ===
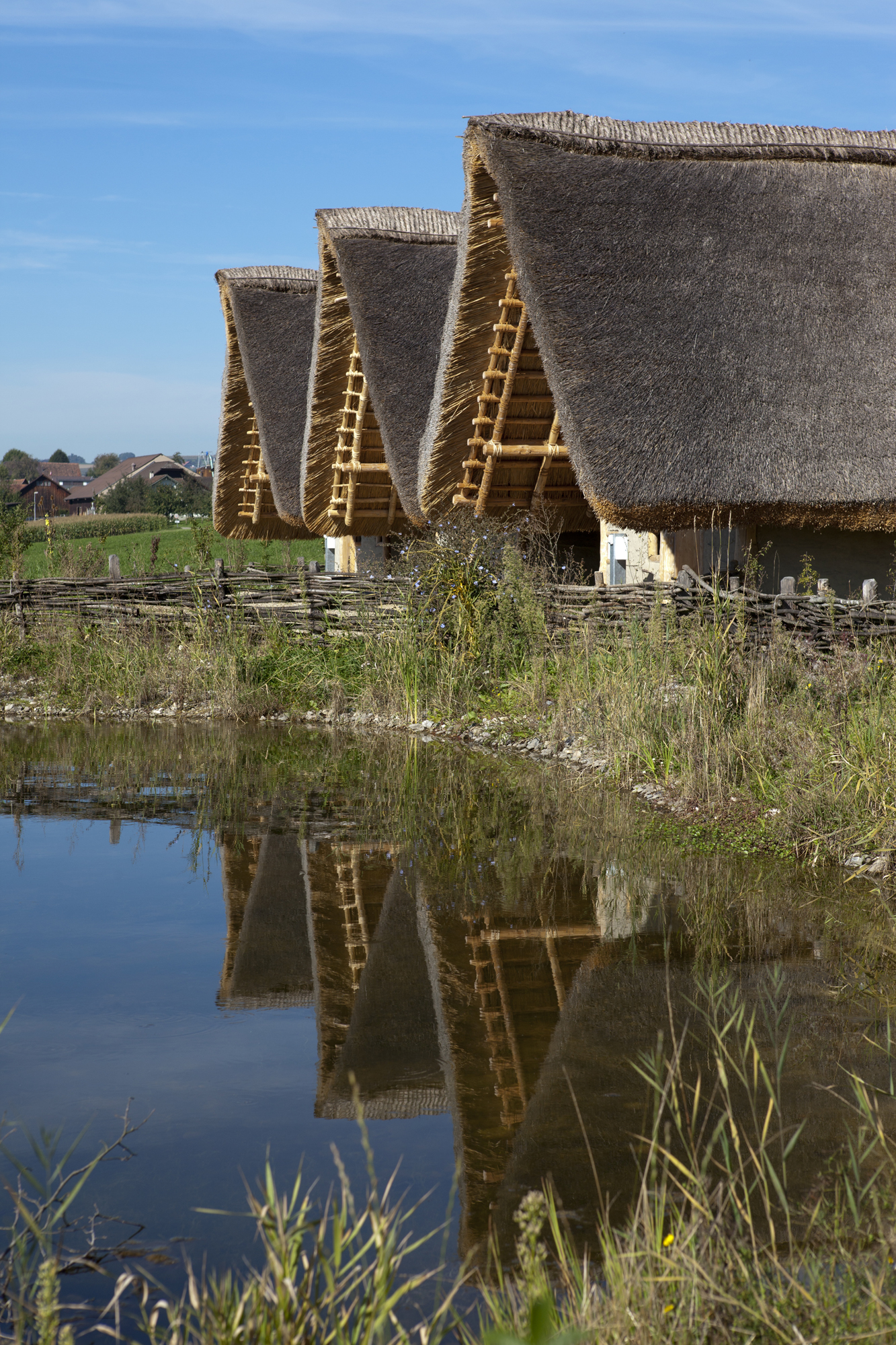
Reconstruction of several stilt houses at Wauwilermoos

The oldest traces of humans in the Lucerne area are stone artifacts and cave bear bones found in the Steigelfadbalm cave on Mount Rigi from the Middle Paleolithic or about 30,000 BC. Other animal bones including mammoth, reindeer and giant deer from the local glacial maximum have also been found in the canton. Around 17,000 BC the glaciers disappeared from the Swiss Plateau and recolonization is likely at that time.

The first Paleolithic and Mesolithic settlement discovered in the canton is in the Wauwilermoos, which is now a Swiss heritage site of national significance. A number of other settlements have since been found, mainly on sandy, dry elevations in the immediate vicinity of water. The settlements of Egolzwil 3 in Wauwilermoos in Egolzwil, Seematte at Hitzkirch and Halbinsel in Sursee are part of the Prehistoric Pile dwellings around the Alps a UNESCO World Heritage Site.

The Wauwilermoos houses had wooden or bark floors and hearths of clay. The villages had ceramic vessels and wood, bone, antler, stone and flint tools as well as textiles. Copper ax blades and knives provide the first evidence of metal use in Switzerland. Imported mollusks show that there were trade connections to the Mediterranean. The bones at Egolzwil 3 are over two thirds from domestic animals with the remainder from wild animals. The main domesticated animals were sheep, goats and pigs with only a few domestic cattle. The animals hunted included deer, roe deer, wild boar and elk.

During the Bronze Age the canton was quite settled. There were a number of settlements on the shores of Lake Sempach and Lake Baldegg along with hilltop settlements, graves and scattered items throughout the area. At Hochdorf-Baldegg a fenced village from the early Bronze Age (2200–1500 BC) was uncovered. The single-story houses all had clay or stone hearths. During the Middle Bronze Age (1550–1350 BC) most of the villages were not located directly on the lake shores. The Late Bronze Age settlement at Sursee-Zellmoos on Lake Sempach featured houses arranged in rows with mortared stone. The walls were timber lined with clay. Another Late Bronze Age settlement near the village of Schötz was densely populated between 1350 and 800 BC.

While numerous individual Iron Age items have been found, almost no settlements have been discovered. From the Hallstatt period (800–480 BC) mainly graves have been discovered. Very little is known about the La Tène period (480–30 BC) in Lucerne. Some iron tools, gold coins, ceramic vessels and a glass bangle as well as a burial ground with at least four graves have been found.

During the Roman era, the canton was once again thickly settled. A number of farms were built in the north–south running valleys (Wigger, Suhre, Wyna and See valleys). During the 1st century AD, the farms provided food for the Legion camp in Vindonissa and for the larger settlements located in the Swiss plateau.

Towards the end of the 1st century there was a vicus at Sursee. The remains of houses show that there were a number of small shops and manufacturing buildings in the town. The west bank of the Suhre was fortified with a stone slip and may have served as a ship or raft berth. Imports from various regions of the Roman Empire (southern Spain, southern Italy, Lipari, southern and eastern Gaul and the Germanic areas) provide evidence of extensive trade relations. Sursee was likely a freight hub for trade with the entire Alpine region.

=== Early Middle Ages ===
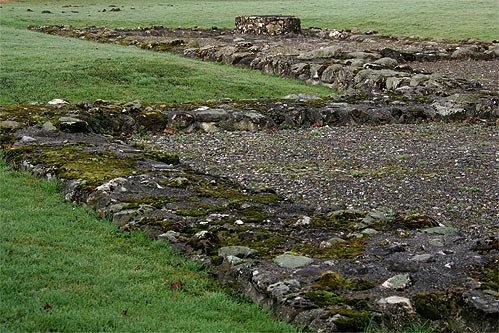
Ruins of an early medieval church at Sursee

Following the collapse of the Roman Empire, the canton of Lucerne was settled by the Alamanni, who generally settled away from the Roman settlements. Some exceptions include a Roman manor at Büron and the Roman town of Sursee. An Alamannic grave field was found at Aesch with 61 graves with wooden coffins from before the 7th century before. In the women's graves there were necklaces with glass and amber beads, while swords were found in the men's graves. Belt buckles and small iron knives were found in the graves of both sexes. A few items from the southern Alpine region, southern Germany and Burgundy indicate that trade continued.

Two early medieval stone grave vaults, both of which were used for multiple burials, were found in the church of Altishofen. In the treasury of Beromünster Abbey there is a 7th-century ornate reliquary of gilded copper plates, which probably came from northern Italy.

=== Foundation of Lucerne city ===
Lucerne grew up around a Benedictine monastery, founded about 750 on the right bank of the Reuss by Murbach Abbey in Alsace, of which it long remained a "cell". It is first mentioned in a charter of 840 under the name of Luciaria, which is probably derived from the patron saint of the monastery, St Leodegar. The name Lucerrun is first mentioned in 1252. At some point, a small village grew up around the monastery. The first signs of a municipal constitution appear in 1252.

With the growing power of the Habsburgs in the area the ties that bound Lucerne to Murbach weakened. In 1291 the Habsburgs finally purchased Lucerne from Murbach. The purchase of Lucerne by the Habsburgs drove the three forest cantons (Uri, Schwyz and Unterwalden) to form an Eternal Alliance, an act that is considered to be the foundation of Switzerland. In 1332 Lucerne became the fourth member of the Eidgenossen or Swiss Confederation, and the first town to join the rural forest cantons.

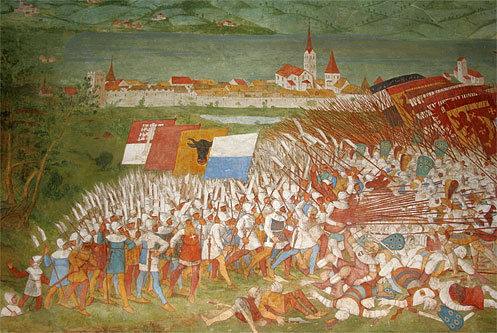
The Battle of Sempach solidified Lucerne's place in the Swiss Confederation

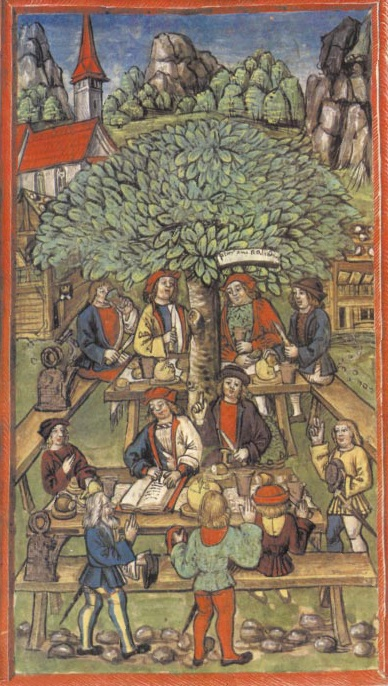
Amstaldenhandel, an event in the history of the canton of Lucerne, Switzerland

The Battle of Sempach (1386) near Sempach (which while allied wouldn't become part of the canton for 8 more years) drove the Habsburgs out of the region and strengthened the Confederation. That victory led also to the gradual acquisition of territory ruled by and from the town.

Amstalden, a wealthy innkeeper Schüpfheim in the Entlebuch valley of the canton of Lucerne, was the leader of a planned rebellion of the valley against the city of Lucerne. In a plot to limit the power of the city, officials from the neighbouring canton of Obwalden had promised their support. The conspiracy was detected before they could stage the planned coup. On 24 August 1478, Amstalden was arrested, tortured and interrogated, and finally beheaded in November 1478.

The incident furthered the distrust amongst rural and urban cantons in the Old Swiss Confederacy and was one of the reasons for the conclusion of the Stanser Verkommnis (Treaty of Stans) in 1481, an important coalition treaty of the cantons of the Old Swiss Confederacy

During the Reformation Lucerne remained attached to Roman Catholicism. The papal nuncio resided here from 1601 to 1873. In the 16th century, during the early modern age, the town government fell into the hands of an aristocratic oligarchy, whose power, though shaken by the Swiss peasant war of 1653 in the Entlebuch, lasted until 1798. Under the French-supported Helvetic republic (1798–1803) Lucerne was the seat of the central government. When the republic collapsed, under the Act of Mediation (1803) it was one of the six "Directorial" cantons and during the Restoration (from 1815 to 1848) it was one of the three ruling cantons.

The patrician government was swept away by the cantonal constitution of 1831. But in 1841 the Conservatives regained power. They quickly recalled the Jesuits, who had been expelled by earlier radical governments, to head the cantonal school system. The riots that followed brought about the Sonderbund War (1847) in which the Conservatives were defeated, the decisive battle taking place at Gisikon, not far from Lucerne.

== Geography ==
The canton of Lucerne is part of Central Switzerland. The lands of the canton lie on the northern foothills of the Swiss Alps (Urner Alps). The highest elevation of the canton of Lucerne is at the Brienzer Rothorn at 2,350 m (7,710 ft). It borders the cantons of Obwalden and Nidwalden to the south, Schwyz and Zug to the east, Aargau to the north, and Bern to the west. Its territory corresponds to the subject territories acquired by the city of Lucerne during the 14th and 15th centuries, including: Lucerne proper at the outflow of the Reuss river from Lake Lucerne; the stretch of the Reuss river between Lucerne and Honau, along Rooterberg hill (connecting to Lake Zug with the territory of Meierskappel municipality); the Kleine Emme basin (including its tributaries Entle and Rümlig); the tributaries of the Aare between Napf and Lindenberg, including (west to east) Wigger, Suhre (Lake Sempach), Wyna, Aabach (Lake Hallwil, Lake Baldegg); two territories connected only by water, across Lake Lucerne: the northern slope of Bürgenstock (part of Lucerne municipality), and the municipalities of Greppen, Weggis and Vitznau on the western and south-western slopes of Mount Rigi.

The area of the canton is 1,493 km^{2} (576 sq mi). 817.7 km^{2} (315.7 sq mi), about 55% of the total land area, is used for agriculture. An additional 449.0 km^{2} (173.4 sq mi) (about 30%) of the canton is wooded. The remainder of the canton is either developed, 125.3 km^{2} (48.4 sq mi) (8.4%), or unproductive (lakes, rivers or mountains), 101.5 km^{2} (39.2 sq mi) (6.8%).

== Political subdivisions ==
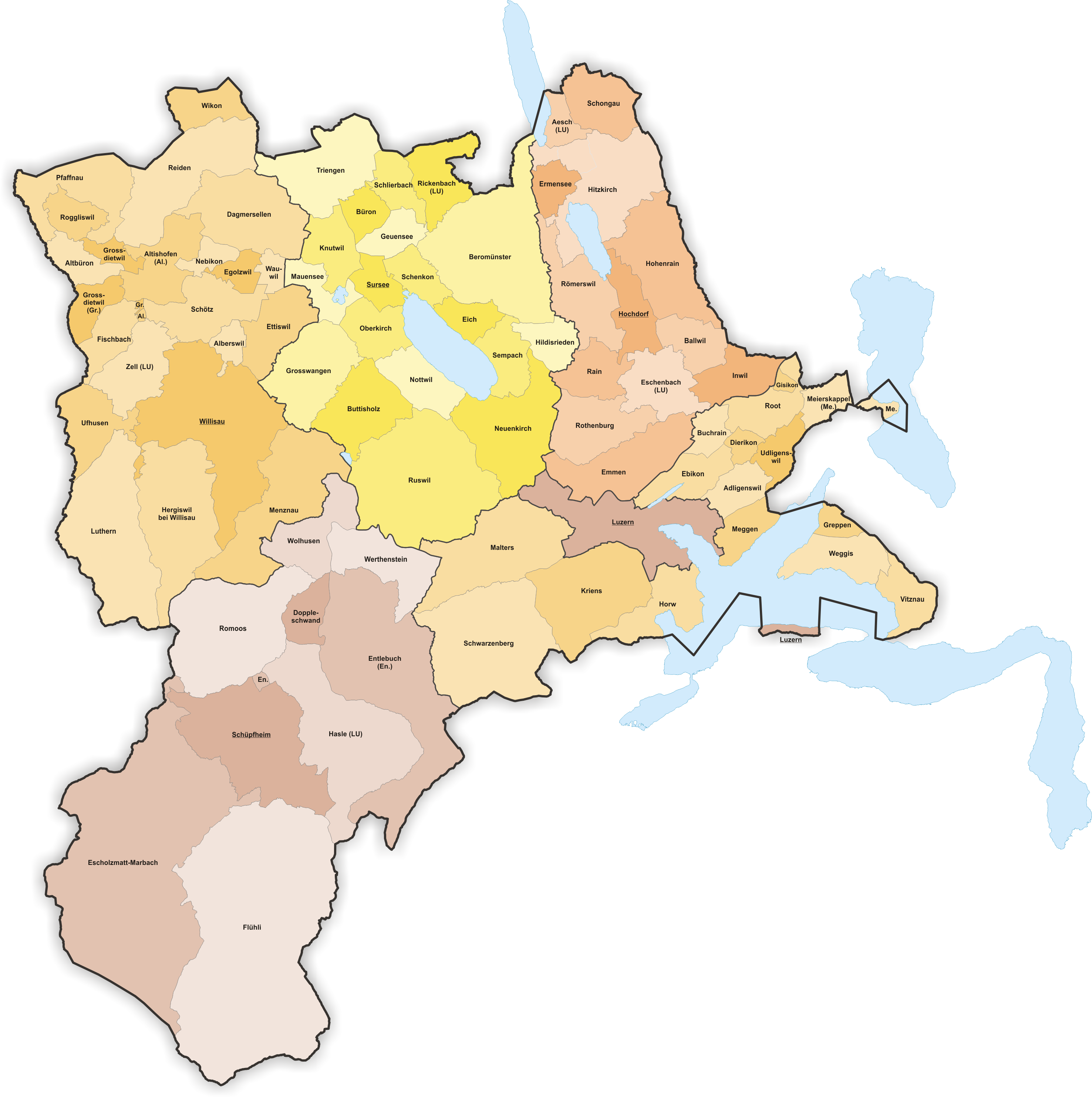
Districts and municipalities (as of 2025)

The Canton is divided into six districts (Wahlkreise): Entlebuch, Hochdorf, Luzern-Land, Luzern-Stadt, Sursee, Willisau.

Before 2007, the districts were called Ämter. There were five districts until 2013, when Luzern District was divided into Luzern-Land and Luzern-Stadt, the latter corresponding to the city of Lucerne proper (including Littau, incorporated into Lucerne in 2010).

There are 79 municipalities in the canton (As of 2025).

== Politics ==
=== Cantonal politics and government ===
The Constitution of Lucerne of 2007 entered into force on 1 January 2008, replacing the 1875 constitution.

With the new constitution, the legislative body Grosser Rat (Grand Council) was renamed to Kantonsrat (Cantonal Council). It is composed of 120 members elected by proportional representation.

The executive body is the Regierungsrat (Government Council), composed of 5 members.

The Christian Democratic People's Party (CVP) is traditionally the largest party, having won 38 seats in the Cantonal Council as of the 2015 elections, and having two out of five members in the Government Council as of 2016.

=== Federal election results ===
Percentage of the total vote per party in the canton in the Federal Elections 1971-2015
Party	Ideology	1971	1975	1979	1983	1987	1991	1995	1999	2003	2007	2011	2015
FDP.The Liberals^{a}	Classical liberalism	30.0	29.1	31.7	28.6	29.8	27.9	25.5	22.6	23.1	21.8	18.4	18.5
CVP/PDC/PPD/PCD	Christian democracy	48.8	50.1	50.4	49.6	47.0	48.6	37.3	33.8	29.5	30.2	27.1	23.9
SP/PS	Social democracy	12.4	13.4	12.5	11.8	9.0	11.0	11.7	10.0	11.1	11.5	11.5	13.6
SVP/UDC	Swiss nationalism	* ^{b}	*	*	*	*	*	14.1	22.8	22.9	25.3	25.1	28.5
Ring of Independents	Social liberalism	8.7	5.3	*	*	*	*	*	*	*	*	*	*
EVP/PEV	Christian democracy	*	*	*	*	*	*	*	*	0.8	0.7	0.7	0.6
CSP/PCS	Christian socialism	*	*	*	*	*	*	*	0.5	*	*	*	*
GLP/PVL	Green liberalism	*	*	*	*	*	*	*	*	*	*	6.1	5.8
BDP/PBD	Conservatism	*	*	*	*	*	*	*	*	*	*	2.1	1.4
POCH	Communism	*	1.8	5.1	8.4	^{c}	*	*	*	*	*	*	*
GPS/PES	Green politics	*	*	*	*	*	9.3	8.1	8.0	9.8	9.5	8.3	7.1
FGA	Feminism	*	*	*	*	8.7	^{d}	0.8	*	*	*	*	*
SD/DS	National conservatism	*	*	*	1.3	1.4	2.8	2.2	0.8	0.4	*	0.2	0.1
FPS/PSL	Right-wing populism	*	*	*	*	3.4	*	*	0.3	*	*	*	*
Other		*	0.4	0.2	0.3	0.6	0.4	0.4	1.1	2.5	1.0	0.5	0.7
Voter participation %		66.3	63.9	59.2	60.5	54.3	50.5	49.4	52.9	50.9	53.0	50.9	50.9

^a FDP before 2009, FDP.The Liberals after 2009
^b "*" indicates that the party was not on the ballot in this canton.
^c Part of a coalition with the FGA
^d Part of a coalition with the Green Party

== Demographics ==
Largest groups of foreign residents 2013
Nationality	Numbers	% of total (% of foreigners)
Germany	14,093	3.6 (20.0)
Italy	7,147	1.8 (10.1)
Portugal	7,063	1.8 (10.0)
Kosovo	6,641	1.7 (9.4)
Serbia	5,986	1.5 (8.5)
Republic of Macedonia	2,299	0.6 (3.3)
Croatia	2,203	0.6 (3.1)
Bosnia and Herzegovina	2,137	0.5 (3.0)
Spain	2,037	0.5 (2.9)
Turkey	1,624	0.4 (2.3)
Austria	1,567	0.4 (2.2)
Sri Lanka	1,477	0.4 (2.1)

Lucerne has a population (as of December 2020) of 416,347. As of 2013, 18.1% of the population are resident foreign nationals, of which 15.5% are from Europe, 1.4% from Asia, 0.7% from Africa, and 0.5% from the Americas. Over the last 10 years (2000–2010) the population has changed at a rate of −0.4%. Migration accounted for −1.2%, while births and deaths accounted for 1.3%.

Most of the population (as of 2010) speaks German (91%) as their first language, while Serbo-Croatian, Italian, Albanian and English are the second most common languages (3%), followed by Portuguese and French with 2% each, and Spanish with 1%.

Of the population in the canton, 115,233 or about 32.9% were born in Lucerne and lived there in 2000. There were 101,980 or 29.1% who were born in the same canton, while 66,486 or 19.0% were born somewhere else in Switzerland, and 55,314 or 15.8% were born outside of Switzerland. As of 2000, children and teenagers (0–19 years old) make up 25% of the population, while adults (20–64 years old) make up 58.6% and seniors (over 64 years old) make up 16.4%.

As of 2000, there were 158,345 people who were single and never married in the canton. There were 159,152 married individuals, 18,853 widows or widowers and 14,154 individuals who are divorced.

As of 2000, there were 13,430 private households in the canton, and an average of 2.5 persons per household. There were 47,012 households that consist of only one person and 12,952 households with five or more people. As of 2009, the construction rate of new housing units was 4.7 new units per 1000 residents.

As of 2003 the average price to rent an average apartment in Lucerne city was 1150.31 Swiss francs (CHF) per month (US$920, £520, €740 approx. exchange rate from 2003). The average rate for a one-room apartment was 646.07 CHF (US$520, £290, €410), a two-room apartment was about 879.64 CHF (US$700, £400, €560), a three-room apartment was about 1033.60 CHF (US$830, £470, €660) and a six or more room apartment cost an average of 2032.38 CHF (US$1630, £910, €1300). The average apartment price in Lucerne was 103.1% of the national average of 1116 CHF. The vacancy rate for the canton, in 2010, was 0.77%.

The largest population centres are Lucerne, Emmen and Kriens.

=== Historic population ===
The historical population is given in the following chart:

Demographic history of the Canton of Luzern 1850–2000
Year	1850	1880	1900	1950	1970	2000
Population	132,843	134,708	146,519	223,249	289,641	350,504
Percent of Total Swiss Population	5.6%	4.8%	4.4%	4.7%	4.6%	4.8%
Language						
German		134,155	143,337	216,647	263,310	311,543
Italian		294	2,204	3,587	15,635	6,801
French		302	747	2,150	2,015	2,053
Romansh		5	64	338	525	388
Other		50	167	527	8,156	29,719
Religion						
Catholic (Note: Before 1950 includes Christian Catholic, from 1950 onward only Roman Catholic)	131,280	129,172	134,020	189,917	246,888	248,545
Protestant	1,563	5,419	12,085	30,396	38,639	42,926
Christian Catholic				1,129	741	471
Other		215	414	1,807	3,373	58,562
Other, Jewish		152	319	497	563	399
Other, Islam					372	13,227
Other, None (Note: Belonging to no organized religious group)					1,672	20,681
Nationality						
Swiss	132,252	132,583	140,176	216,600	259,498	294,709
Foreign	591	2,223	6,343	6,649	30,143	55,795

== Economy ==
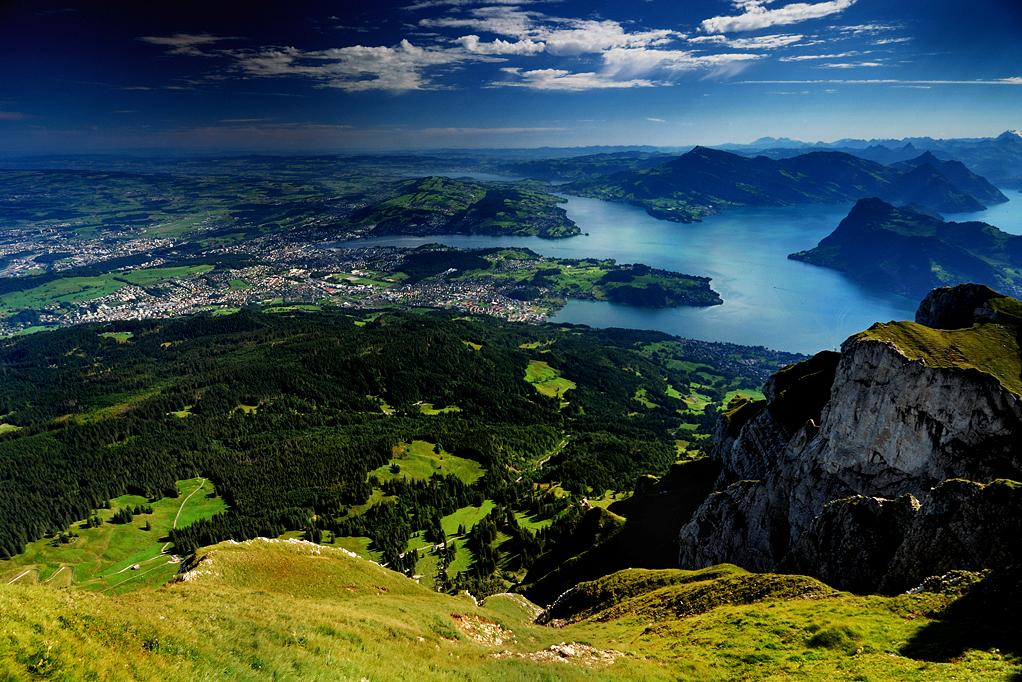
Lucerne area and Lake Lucerne from Pilatus

Much of the land in the canton is used for agriculture. Agriculture is the most significant source of income, but industry is also developed. The most important agricultural products are crops, fruit and cattle breeding. Industry concentrates on textiles, machinery, paper, wood, tobacco and metallurgical goods.

Tourism is of great importance. The canton of Lucerne is a gateway to holiday resorts in the nearby Alps, and much of the transit traffic between Germany and Italy crosses the region.

As of 2010, Luzern had an unemployment rate of 1.4%. As of 2008, there were 1,764 people employed in the primary economic sector and about 703 businesses involved in this sector. 5,388 people were employed in the secondary sector and there were 324 businesses in this sector. 9,431 people were employed in the tertiary sector, with 1,113 businesses in this sector.

In 2008 the total number of full-time equivalent jobs was 160,133. The number of jobs in the primary sector was 9,608, of which 9,462 were in agriculture, 119 were in forestry or lumber production and 27 were in fishing or fisheries. The number of jobs in the secondary sector was 48,191 of which 31,698 or (65.8%) were in manufacturing, 142 or (0.3%) were in mining and 14,990 (31.1%) were in construction. The number of jobs in the tertiary sector was 102,334. In the tertiary sector; 25,105 or 24.5% were in the sale or repair of motor vehicles, 8,182 or 8.0% were in the movement and storage of goods, 8,146 or 8.0% were in a hotel or restaurant, 3,835 or 3.7% were in the information industry, 7,000 or 6.8% were the insurance or financial industry, 10,979 or 10.7% were technical professionals or scientists, 8,111 or 7.9% were in education and 15,924 or 15.6% were in health care.

Of the working population, 12.1% used public transportation to get to work, and 48.5% used a private car.

== Religion ==
From the 2000 census, 248,545 or 70.9% were Roman Catholic, while 39,426 or 11.2% belonged to the Swiss Reformed Church. Of the rest of the population, there were 7,801 members of an Eastern Orthodox church (or 2.23% of the population), there were 471 individuals (or 0.13% of the population) who belonged to the Christian Catholic Church, and there were 7,564 individuals (or 2.16% of the population) who belonged to another Christian church. There were 399 individuals (or 0.11% of the population) who were Jewish, and 13,227 (or 3.77% of the population) followed the religion of Islam. There were 875 individuals who were Buddhist, 1,715 individuals who were Hindu and 293 individuals who belonged to another church. 20,681 (or 5.9% of the population) belonged to no church, are agnostic or atheist, and 13,007 individuals (or 3.71% of the population) did not answer the question.

== Education ==
In Luzern about 127,331 or (36.3%) of the population have completed non-mandatory upper secondary education, and 42,391 or (12.1%) have completed additional higher education (either universities or a Fachhochschule). Of the 42,391 who completed tertiary schooling, 65.0% were Swiss men, 23.6% were Swiss women, 7.0% were non-Swiss men and 4.4% were non-Swiss women.

Institutions of higher education include the University of Lucerne and Lucerne University of Applied Sciences and Arts, which has campuses in Lucerne, Horw, Emmenbrücke and Rotkreuz.
