= Amrhyn family =

Patrician family of Lucerne

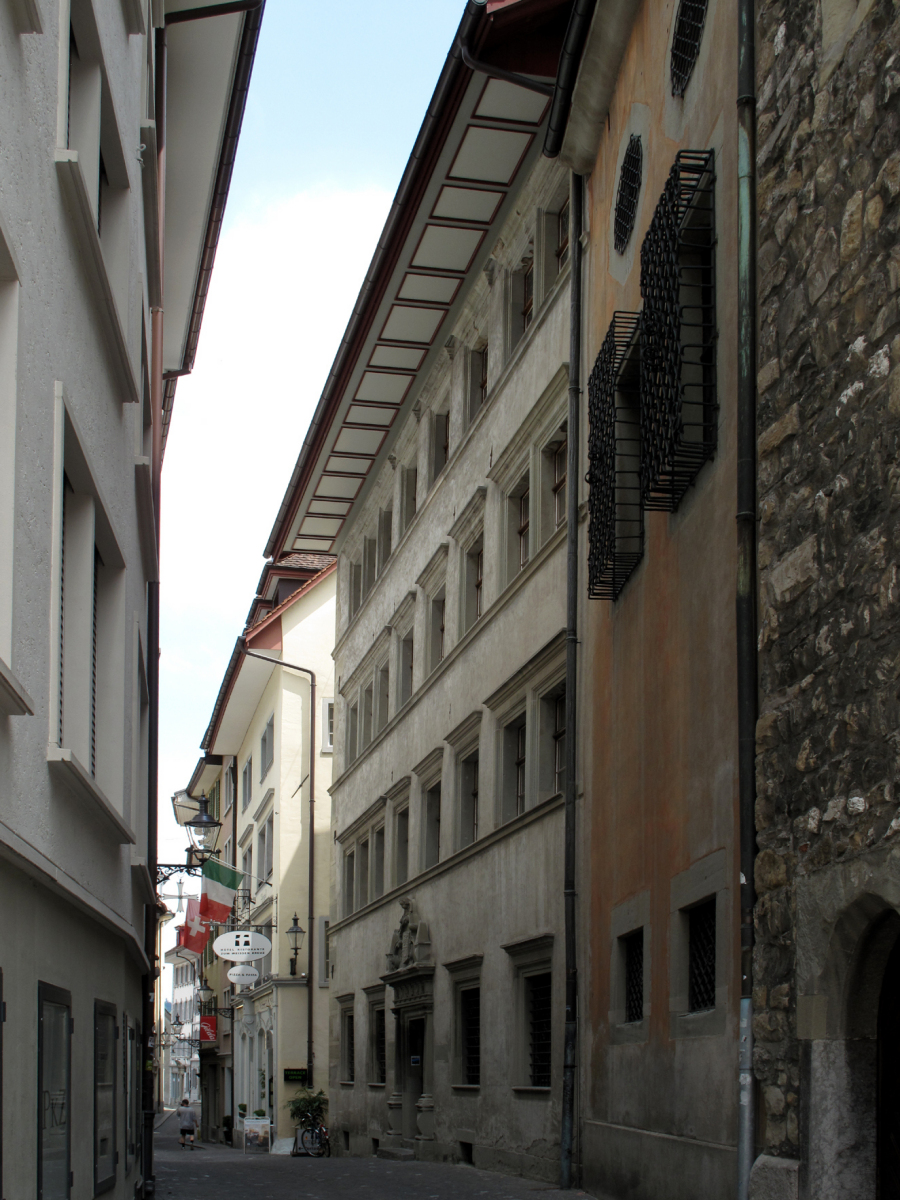
- The Amrhyn House in Lucerne, built in 1616–1618
- Country: Switzerland
- Origin: Probably Beromünster
- Founded: 1518 (citizenship of Lucerne)
- Founder: Michel Amrhyn (died 1548)
- Members: Walther Amrhyn; Joseph Amrhyn (died 1645); Ludwig Amrhyn; Beat Amrhyn; Franz Xaver Amrhyn; Karl Anton Amrhyn; Joseph Amrhyn (Jesuit)
- Connected families: Meyer; Pfyffer; Schwytzer
- Distinctions: Savoyard patent of nobility and arms (1599)
- Estates: Amrhyn House, Furrengasse, Lucerne (built 1616–1618); Country seat of Tribschen; Buholz entailed farm, Ruswil (from 1722)
- Branches: Older line, from Karl Anton Amrhyn; Younger line, from Jost Amrhyn (1664–1713)

The Amrhyn family is a family of the city of Lucerne that was eligible for government office (regimentsfähig) from the second half of the 16th century. From 1564 it was continuously represented in the Small Council of Lucerne, and from 1624 to 1840 it provided an avoyer (Schultheiss) in at least every second generation. With about ten other families, it was one of the most important holders of patrician rule in old Lucerne.

== History ==
Michel Amrhyn (died 1548), who probably came from Beromünster, acquired the citizenship of Lucerne in 1518. He and some of his immediate descendants were tanners and shoemakers. A great-grandson, Walther, obtained a Savoyard patent of nobility and arms (Adels- und Wappenbrief) in 1599 and in 1624 became the first avoyer from the family. His sons Joseph, Ludwig and Jost all sat in the Small Council and, like their father, served the Duchy of Savoy, among other things as captains of the guard. The older line descends from Karl Anton; among others, it produced several liberal members of the Grand Council in the 20th century. The younger line goes back to his brother Jost (1664–1713).

From 1624 to 1840 the family provided an avoyer in at least every second generation. The Amrhyn were continuously represented in the Small Council from 1564, at times even with several members. With about ten other families, they were thus among the most important holders of patrician rule in old Lucerne. They married above all into the Meyer, Pfyffer and Schwytzer families. Until the end of the Ancien Régime, the family members elected to the Small Council held high ranks in mercenary service with above-average frequency: in the 17th century for Savoy, Milan and Spain, and in the 18th century mainly for France.

Younger sons and daughters often entered religious life, and several members of the family were prominent in the Jesuit order, among them Beat, Franz Xaver and Joseph. Attempts around 1800 to make careers in commerce were not successful. The family's dynastic awareness showed especially in the care with which the eldest sons were prepared for a career in public office.

Former family residences are the Amrhyn House (Amrhynhaus) in the Furrengasse in Lucerne, built in the Renaissance style in 1616–1618, and the country seat of Tribschen. The entailed (Fideikommiss) farm of Buholz in Ruswil was endowed in 1722 by Ignaz Amrhyn, provost of Beromünster.

== Bibliography ==
- Die Kunstdenkmäler des Kantons Luzern, 3, 1954
- K. Messmer and P. Hoppe, Luzerner Patriziat, 1976

=== Archives ===
- J. Brülisauer, Das Familienarchiv Amrhyn, 1982 (with family tree)
