= Rudolf Pfyffer von Altishofen =

Swiss politician and military officer

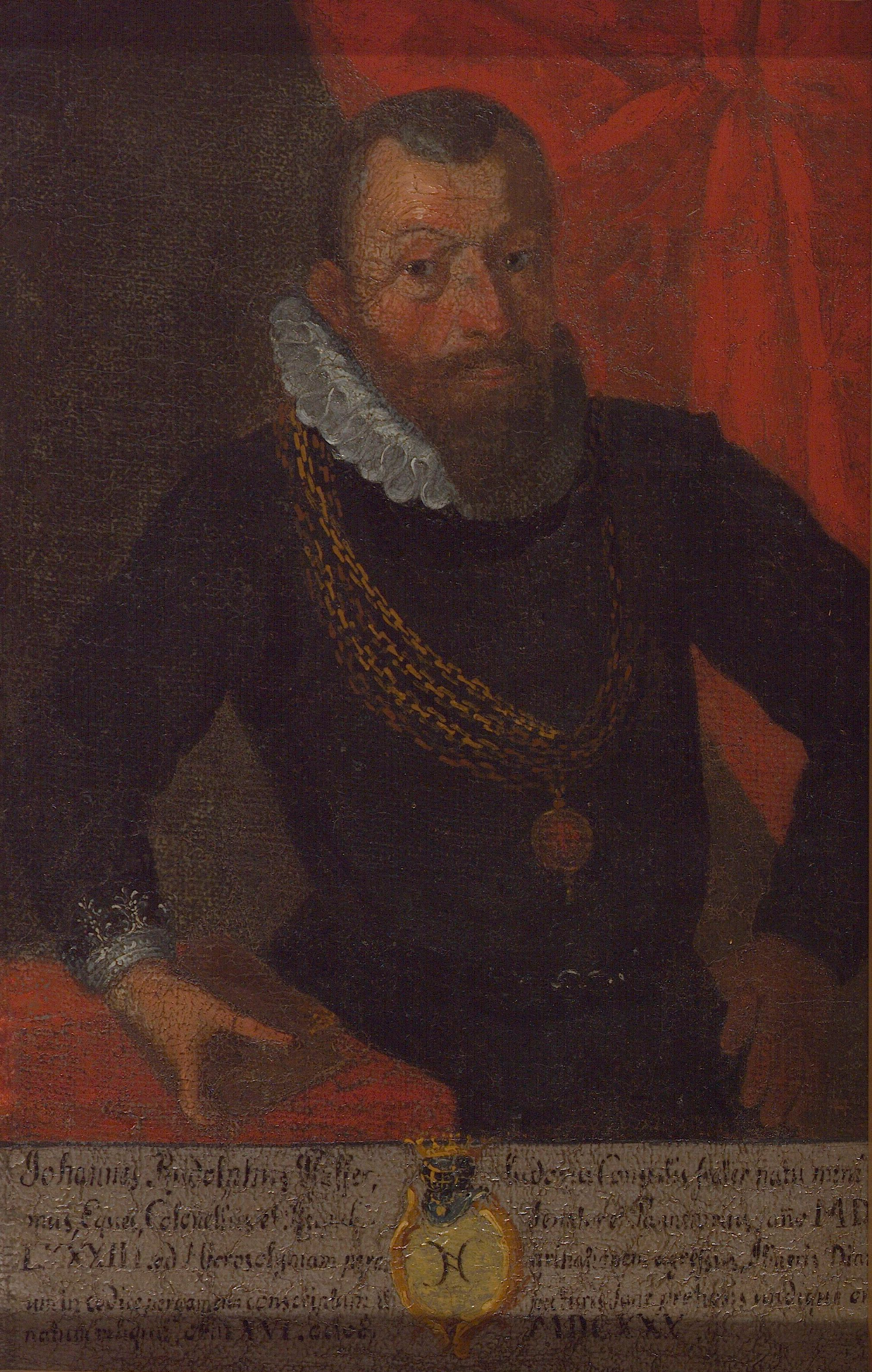
- Born: 1545
- Died: 16 September 1630 (aged 84–85); Lucerne, Swiss Confederacy
- Spouse(s): Margaretha Feer; Anna Katharina Clauser; Barbara von Hertenstein; Maria Salome Hässi; Beatrix Segesser von Brunegg
- Family: Pfyffer

Rudolf Pfyffer von Altishofen (1545 – 16 September 1630 in Lucerne) was a Lucerne patrician, military officer, and politician. A member of the Pfyffer von Altishofen family, he served in foreign military service and held senior positions in the government of Lucerne.

== Family and early life ==
Rudolf was the son of Leodegar Pfyffer, a member of the Small Council and treasurer, and Elisabeth Kiel. He was the brother of Jost Pfyffer and Ludwig Pfyffer von Altishofen, and the nephew of Jost Pfyffer and Kaspar Pfyffer. He received his education in Paris.

== Career ==
Rudolf served as administrator of the bailliwick of Arbon on behalf of the Bishop of Constance from 1575 to 1578. In 1583–1584 he undertook a pilgrimage to Jerusalem. He became a colonel in the service of France in 1589, and subsequently served as captain of the Swiss Guards of the Duke of Lorraine.

He was a member of the Grand Council of Lucerne from 1593 to 1611, then of the Small Council from 1611 until his death in 1630, and was appointed banneret in 1629. He frequently served as a delegate of Lucerne. He also participated in unsuccessful attempts at mining exploitation in the Entlebuch and at Malters.

Rudolf was a Knight of the Holy Sepulchre and of the Order of the Golden Spur.

== Bibliography ==
- J. Schmid, ed., Luzerner und Innerschweizer Pilgerreisen zum Heiligen Grab in Jerusalem vom 15. bis 17. Jahrhundert, 1957, pp. XLI–XLIX, 153–162.
- K. Messmer, P. Hoppe, Luzerner Patriziat, 1976, pp. 492–493.
