= Joseph Amrhyn (disambiguation) =

Joseph Amrhyn may refer to:

- Joseph Amrhyn (1717–1795), Swiss Jesuit priest and rector of the Jesuit college of Lucerne.
- Joseph Amrhyn (died 1645) (1589–1645), Lucerne politician and officer in Savoyard service
- Joseph Amrhyn (died 1692) (1625–1692), avoyer of Lucerne

== See also ==
- Josef Karl Amrhyn (1777–1848), Swiss politician, father of Josef Franz Karl Amrhyn
- Amrhyn family
