= Joseph Amrhyn (died 1692) =

Avoyer of Lucerne (1625–1692)

- Born: 24 December 1625; Lucerne, Old Swiss Confederacy
- Died: 1 November 1692 (aged 66); Lucerne, Old Swiss Confederacy
- Occupation: Politician
- Spouse: Sybilla Göldlin von Tiefenau (m. 1648)
- Children: Franz Xaver Amrhyn; Karl Anton Amrhyn
- Father: Joseph Amrhyn
- Relatives: Beat Amrhyn (brother)

Joseph Amrhyn (24 December 1625 – 1 November 1692) was a Swiss politician from Lucerne, a member of the Amrhyn family. He was a member of the Small Council of Lucerne from 1652 and avoyer (Schultheiss) in the odd-numbered years from 1673 to 1687. From 1666 to 1668 he was captain of the papal Swiss guard at San Salvatore in Lauro.

== Biography ==
Joseph Amrhyn was born on 24 December 1625 in Lucerne, the son of Joseph Amrhyn. His brother was Beat Amrhyn. In 1648 he married Sybilla Göldlin von Tiefenau, daughter of Renward Göldlin von Tiefenau, a captain. His sons were the Jesuit Franz Xaver Amrhyn and the avoyer Karl Anton Amrhyn. He was educated at the Jesuit college in Lucerne.

Amrhyn became a member of the Grand Council (Grossrat) of Lucerne in 1644 and of the Small Council (Kleinrat) in 1652. From 1673 to 1687 he was avoyer in the odd-numbered years; in 1688 he declined re-election. He was an envoy to the Federal Diet (Tagsatzung). He was bailiff (Vogt) of Malters from 1649 to 1651, of Ruswil from 1653 to 1655, in the Thurgau from 1660 to 1662 and of Rothenburg in 1669. In 1656 he became Sentiherr, in charge of the Senti hospital (Sentispital), the leper house of St. Jakob. In 1658 he became hospital master (Spitalherr), in 1664–1665 he was master of works (Bauherr), and in 1673 he became banneret (Pannerherr).

From 1666 to 1668 Amrhyn was captain of the papal Swiss guard at San Salvatore in Lauro. He was a knight of the Order of Saints Maurice and Lazarus. He was wealthy and reportedly left more than 200,000 guilders at his death in 1692. After he stepped down from the office of avoyer, he enjoyed the highest esteem in the council. He died in Lucerne on 1 November 1692.

== Bibliography ==
- T. von Liebenau, "Die Schultheissen von Luzern", in Der Geschichtsfreund 35, 1880, 163–165
- J. Marbacher, Schultheiss Karl Anton am Rhyn von Luzern und seine Zeit (1660–1714), 1953
- K. Messmer and P. Hoppe, Luzerner Patriziat, 1976
