= Jost Pfyffer (merchant, born 1531) =

Lucerne politician and merchant

- Died: 10 March 1610; Lucerne
- Other name: Jost Pfyffer von Wyher

Jost Pfyffer (also known as Jost Pfyffer von Wyher; born 1531; died 10 March 1610) was a Lucerne merchant, financier, and politician from the Pfyffer family.

A member of the Catholic patriciate of Lucerne, he served as avoyer of the city on several occasions and held various administrative and military positions.

== Life and family ==
Pfyffer was the son of Leodegar Pfyffer, a member of the Small Council and treasurer, and Elisabeth Kiel. He was the brother of Ludwig Pfyffer von Altishofen and Rudolf Pfyffer von Altishofen, and the nephew of Jost Pfyffer and Kaspar Pfyffer. He married twice: first to Anna von Fleckenstein, and second in 1601 to Elisabeth Bodmer of Baden.

== Career ==
Pfyffer worked as a wine merchant, financier, and mine operator. He entered the Grand Council of Lucerne in 1583, then the Small Council in 1595, and served as avoyer in odd-numbered years from 1595 to 1597 and from 1601 to 1607. He was bailiff of Habsburg (1583–1585) and of Büron and Triengen (1587–1589).

He served in France in 1572, became a captain in 1582, and was promoted to colonel in 1589. He was also administrator and patron of the Jesuit college in Lucerne from 1589 to 1592. Pfyffer aligned himself with the Spanish party and received a pension from Savoy. He was ennobled by King Henry III of France in 1577.

Though he remained in the shadow of his more prominent brother Ludwig during the latter's lifetime, Jost acceded to the Small Conseil following Ludwig's death and was directly elected avoyer.

== Bibliography ==
- K. Messmer, P. Hoppe, Luzerner Patriziat, 1976, p. 208.
