= Heinrich Fleckenstein =

Swiss politician and merchant (c. 1484–1558)

- Born: c. 1484; Lucerne
- Died: 1558
- Spouse(s): Martha von Meggen; Anna Reichmuth

Heinrich Fleckenstein (probably born 1484; died 1558) was a Luzern-born Swiss politician, merchant, and avoyer of Lucerne.

He was the son of Clewi (Niklaus) Wetzel, called Fleckenstein, a carrier, wine merchant, innkeeper, and member of the Grand Council from 1489, and of Margret von Alikon. He held the rank of knight and married first Martha von Meggen, then Anna Reichmuth, daughter of Gilg, Ammann of Schwyz.

== Political career ==
Fleckenstein was elected to the Lucerne Grand Council in 1515 and to the Kleinrat in 1522, where he served until 1558. He was avoyer in 1535 and in the even-numbered years from 1540 to 1546, during which he was aligned with the imperial (Habsburg) party. His administrative posts included bailiff (Vogt) at Weggis (1521–23), deputy governor (Statthalter) in the Thurgau Landvogtei (1522), Vogt at Baden (1523–25), at Willisau (1527–29), at Rothenburg (1532–34), and at Merenschwand (1545). He frequently served as a delegate to the Federal Diet and as a Swiss envoy to Rome in 1556.

During his term as Vogt at Baden, Fleckenstein was involved in the arrest of the reformist Klaus Hottinger, who was subsequently transferred to Lucerne and executed. He also participated in the interrogations following the sack of Ittingen of 1524.

== Military service ==
Fleckenstein served as a captain in imperial service in Italy in 1521 and as shooting captain (Schützenhauptmann) of Lucerne's forces at the Battle of Kappel in 1531.

== Commercial activities ==
In addition to his political career, Fleckenstein ran the inn "Zur Sonne" and traded in wine. Around 1520, together with Pietro de Sala, he operated a cloth trade in Torno on Lake Como, and later in Lugano. This venture has been described as perhaps the most significant commercial enterprise run by Lucerne councillors in the sixteenth century; it collapsed in the late 1540s. Fleckenstein also traded in grain and rice from northern Italy and other goods, participated in gold prospecting in the Kleine Emme, and increasingly engaged in financial transactions. He left an estate of approximately 36,000 florins.

== Bibliography ==
- K. Messmer, P. Hoppe, Luzerner Patriziat, 1976.
- J. Wiget, Wirtschaft und Politik im spätmittelalterlichen Luzern, 1978.
