= Jost Holdermeyer =

Lucerne politician and entrepreneur

- Died: 24 June 1599; Lucerne
- Spouse(s): Dorothea Sonnenberg; Magdalena Tamman; Barbara Stocker

Jost Holdermeyer (died 24 June 1599) was a Lucerne politician and entrepreneur. He served in various civic and administrative roles in the Old Swiss Confederacy.

== Political career ==
Holdermeyer was a member of the Grand Council of Lucerne from 1565, then of the Small Council (1569–1599), and served as avoyer in 1599 and treasurer from 1576 to 1599. He also held the position of bailiff (Landvogt) of Habsburg (1567–1569) and of Entlebuch (1571–1573).

== Administrative and religious roles ==
He served as administrator of Saint-Jost in 1570 and as councillor to the Bishop of Basel in 1594. Holdermeyer was among the first to support the establishment of the Jesuits (college) in Lucerne.

== Economic activities ==
Holdermeyer owned several estates, orchards, vineyards, and two houses. As an entrepreneur, he had sawmills built on two of his estates, protected by a monopoly (1567, 1594), and in 1587 purchased the city forge of Lucerne together with Jost Krepsinger for 1,000 florins. He was a rentier and a member of the Safran guild (Gesellschaft zu Safran).

== Bibliography ==
- K. Messmer, P. Hoppe, Luzerner Patriziat, 1976.
