= Walter Ludwig Leonz Amrhyn =

Swiss magistrate and avoyer of Lucerne

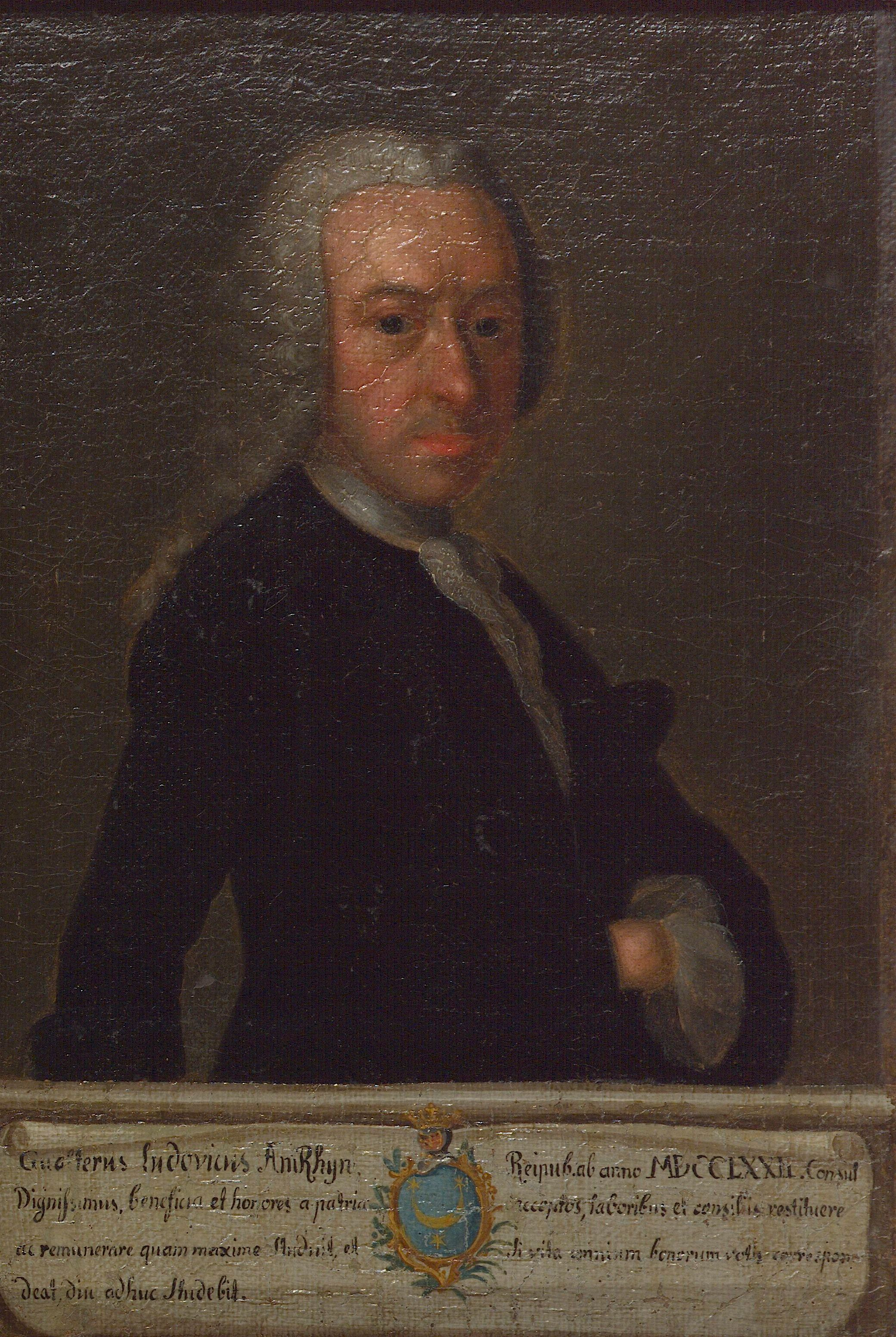
- Portrait of Walthert Ludwig Leonz Amrhyn exhibit in the library hall of ZHB Luzern (Switzerland)
- Born: 2 September 1716; Lucerne, Old Swiss Confederacy
- Died: 15 February 1793 (aged 76); Lucerne, Old Swiss Confederacy
- Known for: Avoyer of Lucerne

Walter Ludwig Leonz Amrhyn (2 September 1716, Lucerne – 15 February 1793, Lucerne) was a Swiss politician and magistrate from Lucerne who served as avoyer of the city from 1773 to 1793. He was the son of Joseph Cölestin, a member of the Small Council, and the grandson of Karl Anton Amrhyn. His brother was Joseph Amrhyn.

== Career ==
Amrhyn became a member of the Grand Council from 1736 and of the Small Council from 1744. He also served as a delegate to the Federal Diet. He began his administrative career as a bailiff's secretary in 1741 and served as bailli of Ruswil from 1747 to 1749. Like his father, he held the lucrative post of director of salts (Salzdirektors) from 1750 to 1759. He subsequently served as treasurer from 1761 to 1770, and was appointed banneret of the city in 1775. He served as avoyer from 1773 to 1793, holding office in the odd-numbered years.

Amrhyn repeatedly banned the reading society of Lucerne which was inspired by the spirit of the Enlightenment.

== Personal life ==
In 1738 he married Maria Theresia Sonnenberg.

== Bibliography ==
- T. von Liebenau, «Die Schultheissen von Luzern», in Geschichtsfreund (Gfr.), vol. 35, 1880, pp. 176–178.
- L. von Tetmajer, Josef Karl Amrhyn, 1941, pp. 12, 19.
