= Alphons von Sonnenberg =

17th-century Lucerne statesman

- Born: 16 October 1603; Lucerne
- Died: 9 February 1674 (aged 70)
- Spouse: Catharina von Fleckenstein
- Parent(s): Jakob von Sonnenberg, Anna Pfyffer von Wyher

Alphons von Sonnenberg (16 October 1603, Lucerne – 9 February 1674) was a Lucerne statesman and military officer.

== Family background ==
Alphons von Sonnenberg was a Catholic from Lucerne, son of Jakob Sonnenberg and Anna Pfyffer von Wyher, brother of Franz von Sonnenberg, and half-brother of Ignaz Walter von Sonnenberg and Karl Emanuel von Sonnenberg. He married Catharina von Fleckenstein, daughter of Bernhard von Fleckenstein.

== Political and administrative career ==
Alphons von Sonnenberg was a member of the Grand Council of Lucerne from 1631, and of the Small Council from 1648 until his death in 1674. He served as avoyer of Lucerne from 1664 to 1674 (even years). His administrative posts included bailiff of Baden (1635–1637), Bauherr (1649–1664), bailiff of Merenschwand (1673), city banneret, and banneret. He was also lord justice (Twingherr) of Wangen and Grossdietwil, and a delegate to the Federal Diet.

== Military and diplomatic career ==
In 1636 he was sent as envoy to Louis XIII in Paris. He became captain of the Swiss Guard in 1640 and chamberlain to the king. During the First War of Villmergen (1656) he served as major general. He was a fervent defender of the Counter-Reformation.

== Bibliography ==
- Th. von Liebenau, «Die Schultheissen von Luzern», in Gfr., 35, 1880, pp. 53–182.
