= Kaspar Pfyffer =

Swiss merchant and politician

- Born: 1524
- Died: 14 November 1616 (aged 91–92); Lucerne, Swiss Confederacy
- Spouse: Katharina Fleckenstein
- Family: Pfyffer

Kaspar Pfyffer (1524 – 14 November 1616) was a Lucerne merchant, cloth trader, and politician, as well as a benefactor of the Capuchin order in Lucerne. He was a member of the Pfyffer family.

== Family ==
Kaspar was the son of Hans Pfyffer, a tailor, cloth trader, draper, and member of the Small Council, and of Margaretha Kiel. He was the brother of Jost Pfyffer.

He married Katharina Fleckenstein, daughter of Heinrich Fleckenstein

== Career ==
Kaspar was active as a cloth trader, merchant, and in financial dealings. From 1569 he served as French postmaster in Lucerne. He was a member of the Grand Council of Lucerne from 1567 to 1585, and of the Small Council from 1585 until his death in 1616. In 1594 he narrowly lost the election for avoyer to his nephew Jost Pfyffer. He served as Vogt of Malters and Littau (1577–1579), of the Entlebuch (1589–1591), and of Willisau (1597–1599 and 1601–1603).

In 1559, Kaspar received a letter of nobility from the French king Francis II, as compensation for unpaid interest owed to him.

== Patronage ==
In 1584, Kaspar donated the land for the construction of the Capuchin monastery Wesemlin in Lucerne and largely financed its construction himself.

== Bibliography ==
- E. Usteri, "Die finanziellen Hintergründe der Adelsbriefe für Benedikt Stokar und Caspar P.", in SchBeitr 16, 1939, pp. 94–107.
- K. Messmer, P. Hoppe, Luzerner Patriziat, 1976, pp. 208–209.
- Vierhundert Jahre Kapuziner auf dem Wesemlin, 1588–1988, exhibition catalogue, Lucerne, 1988.
