= Jakob von Sonnenberg =

Lucerne politician and bailiff

Jakob Sonnenberg
- Born: 10 January 1556; Lucerne, Old Swiss Confederacy
- Died: 13 August 1629 (aged 73)

Jakob Sonnenberg (10 January 1556, Lucerne – 13 August 1629) was a Catholic Lucerne politician who served as avoyer of Lucerne from 1612 to 1622 and held numerous administrative and diplomatic posts in the Old Swiss Confederacy.

== Life and career ==
Jakob von Sonnenberg was the son of Jacob von Sonnenberg, a member of the Small Council of Lucerne, and Catharina Clauser. He married three times: first to Margareta Holdermeyer, daughter of Jost Holdermeyer; second to Anna Pfyffer von Wyher, daughter of Jost Pfyffer von Wyher; and third to Catharina Amrhyn, daughter of Walther Amrhyn. Through his marriages he became a brother-in-law of Joseph Amrhyn and Ludwig Amrhyn. He studied in Rome and Paris, among other places.

By profession a rentier and wine merchant, Sonnenberg was a member of the Safran guild (Gesellschaft zu Safran) in Lucerne. He entered the Grand Council of Lucerne in 1576, was elected to the Small Council in 1599, where he served until his death in 1629, and held the office of avoyer from 1612 to 1622 (even years). He also held the position of banneret.

As bailiff, Sonnenberg administered the districts of Habsburg-Root (1581–1583 and 1585–1587), Entlebuch (1603–1605), Rothenburg (1610–1613), and Merenschwand (1614). He was also sent on diplomatic missions to Spain, Milan, Turin, and Austria, and in 1605 travelled to Rome as envoy to the Pope, where he was dubbed a knight.

== Bibliography ==
- F. Peter, Franz von Sonnenberg, 1977.
