= Jost Pfyffer (merchant, died 1584) =

16th-century Lucerne politician

- Died: 7 August 1584; Lucerne
- Occupations: Merchant, politician
- Family: Pfyffer

Jost Pfyffer (died 7 August 1584 in Lucerne) was a Lucerne merchant and politician, member of the prominent Pfyffer family.

He served as avoyer of Lucerne and was a leading figure of the French party in the city, before being implicated in the Pfyffer-Amlehn conspiracy and sentenced to perpetual banishment.

== Life and career ==
Jost Pfyffer was the son of Hans Pfyffer, a tailor, cloth merchant, grocer, and member of the Small Council, and of Margaretha Kiel. He was the brother of Kaspar Pfyffer. He married four times: Dorothea Sonnenberg, Anna Maria Cloos, Anna Heinserlin, and (in 1582) Margaretha von Moos. He likely completed an apprenticeship as a tailor and subsequently worked as a cloth merchant, trader, rentier, and financier.

Pfyffer was elected to the Grand Council from 1543, then to the Small Council of Lucerne (1550–1569 and 1573–1584). He served as Baumeister (1557–1558) and as avoyer in alternation with Niklaus Amlehn (1559–1569), and was a delegate to the Federal Diet (1560–1568). He also held several bailiff (Vogt) posts: Kriens and Horw (1543–1545), Büron (1547–1549), Entlebuch (1551–1553), Lugano (1554–1556), and Rothenburg (1557–1559).

Captain Pfyffer was the representative of the French party in Lucerne. After the death of Lux Ritter in 1559 he took over the distribution of French pensions, and was ennobled by Charles IX of France in 1563.

== The Pfyffer-Amlehn conspiracy ==
In 1559, Pfyffer entered into a secret agreement with Amlehn and other council members, aimed at strengthening the French cause, securing Amlehn's accession to the office of avoyer, and controlling the council. After the conspirators fell out among themselves and the affair came to light in December 1568, Amlehn confessed in 1569 to his own guilt and that of his allies, in exchange for immunity from punishment. Pfyffer was stripped of his honour and civic rights and sentenced to perpetual banishment.

Although he had also participated in the conspiracy, Pfyffer's nephew Ludwig Pfyffer von Altishofen succeeded him as avoyer in 1570. Louis subsequently secured his uncle's rehabilitation in 1571, his return to the Small Council in 1573, and the revocation of Amlehn. The Pfyffer-Amlehn affair triggered the Rothenburg uprising of 1570, directed against new fiscal burdens imposed by the authorities and attributed to Pfyffer.

== Bibliography ==
=== Archival sources ===
- Pfyffer-Amlehn affair, StALU

=== Secondary sources ===
- K. Messmer, P. Hoppe, Luzerner Patriziat, 1976
- A. Suter, "Verschwörungen in der schweizerischen Eidgenossenschaft der Frühen Neuzeit", in RSH, 45, 1995, pp. 330–370
