= Karl Emanuel von Sonnenberg =

Swiss Jesuit priest and translator

- Born: 7 May 1614; Lucerne, Switzerland
- Died: 31 July 1668 (aged 54); Lucerne, Switzerland

Karl Emanuel von Sonnenberg (7 May 1614, Lucerne – 31 July 1668, Lucerne) was a Swiss Jesuit priest, educator, and translator, known for his translation of the work of the Baroque poet Jakob Balde.

== Life ==
Sonnenberg was born in Lucerne into the Sonnenberg family. He was the son of Jakob von Sonnenberg and Catharina Amrhyn, brother of Ignaz Walter von Sonnenberg, and half-brother of Alphons von Sonnenberg and Franz von Sonnenberg. He entered the Society of Jesus at Landsberg (Bavaria) in 1630, pursued theological studies at University of Ingolstadt from 1640 to 1644, and was ordained in 1644 at Eichstätt, both in Bavaria.

He served as a schoolmaster in Munich (1644–1647), then exercised ministry in Lucerne (1651–1653). He subsequently became professor of rhetoric and director of conscience in Augsburg (1653–1656), and rector in Fribourg (1656–1662). In 1662, he became the first superior of the Jesuit college in Brig, a position he held until 1664. He is also noted as a translator of the Baroque poet Jakob Balde.

== Bibliography ==
- F. Strobel, Schweizer Jesuitenlexikon, ms., 1986, p. 528
- HS, VII, 185
