= Ignaz Walter von Sonnenberg =

Swiss Jesuit missionary in Asia

- Born: 13 July 1612; Lucerne, Swiss Confederacy
- Died: 20 July 1680 (aged 68); Fuzhou, China
- Occupation: Jesuit missionary

Ignaz Walter von Sonnenberg (13 July 1612, Lucerne – 20 July 1680, Fuzhou, China) was a Swiss Jesuit missionary who worked in the Philippines and China during the seventeenth century.

He was the son of Jakob von Sonnenberg and Catharina Amrhyn, brother of Karl Emanuel von Sonnenberg, and half-brother of Alphons von Sonnenberg and Franz von Sonnenberg.

== Education and formation ==
Sonnenberg attended the Jesuit college in Lucerne, then entered the novitiate at Landsberg in Bavaria in 1628. He studied classical subjects in Augsburg (1630–1631), philosophy at the University of Ingolstadt (1631–1634), and theology there as well (1637–1641). Between these periods, he worked as a grammar teacher and educator in Dillingen (1634–1636) and Burghausen (1636–1637), both in Bavaria. He was ordained at Eichstätt (Bavaria) in 1641.

== Missionary career ==
Following his ordination in 1641, Sonnenberg departed as a missionary, travelling via Seville and Mexico, and arrived in the Philippines in 1643. There, operating under the name Ignacio de Monte, he spent twenty-five years evangelizing Chinese immigrants in Manila and, later, indigenous people in Santa Cruz. Between 1653 and 1678, he served multiple terms as rector in Silang. At his own request, he was transferred to China in 1678, where he died in Fuzhou in 1680.

== Bibliography ==
- F. Strobel, Schweizer Jesuitenlexikon, ms., 1986, p. 528
- B. Hausberger, Jesuiten aus Mitteleuropa im kolonialen Mexiko, 1995
