= Jost Pfyffer =

Jost Pfyffer may refer to two Lucerne merchants:

- Jost Pfyffer (merchant, died 1584), Swiss politician and avoyer of Lucerne
- Jost Pfyffer (merchant, born 1531), Swiss politician and avoyer of Lucerne
