= Richard Wagner Museum, Lucerne =

Richard Wagner Museum
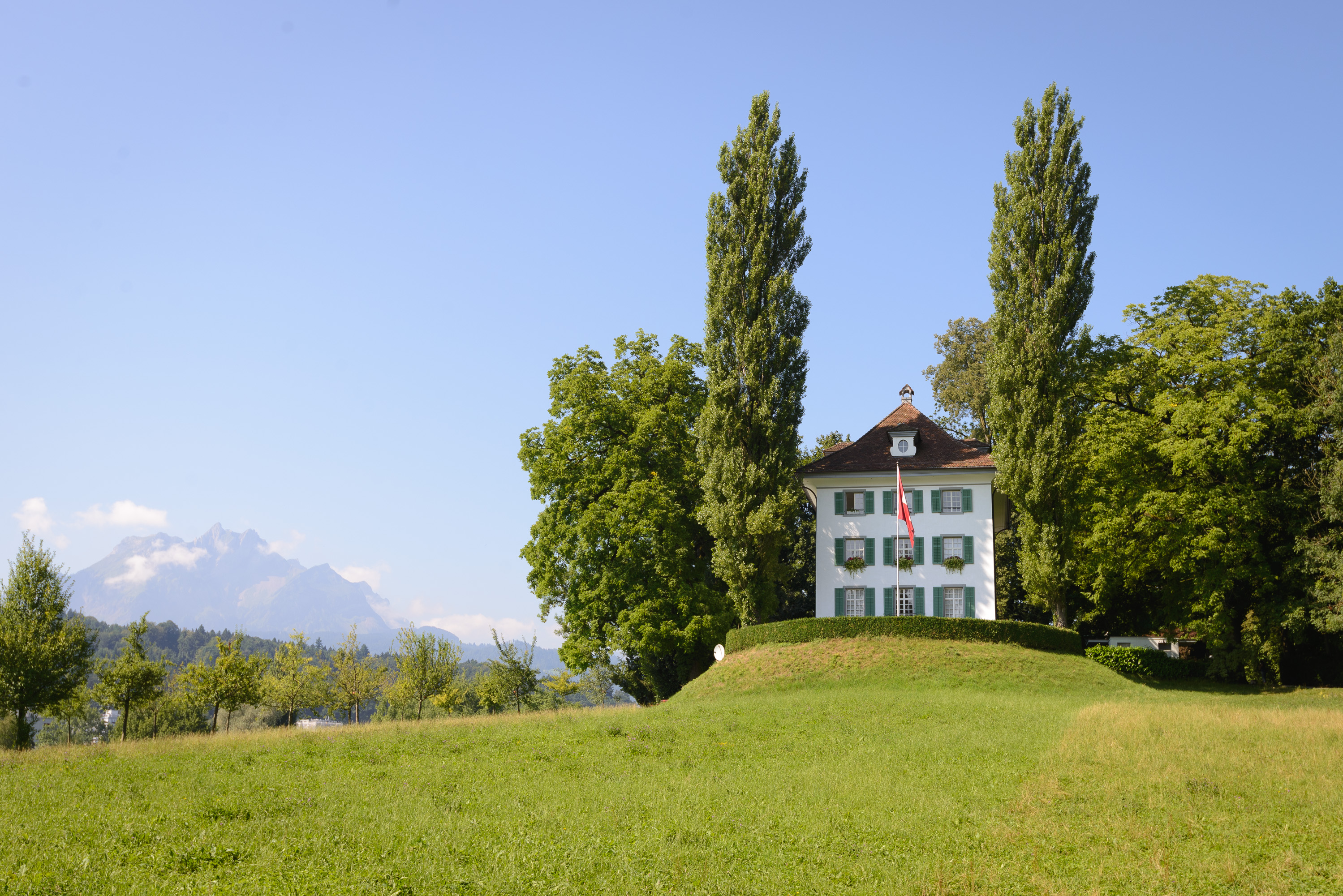

General information
- Location: Richard-Wagner-Weg 27, Lucerne, Switzerland
- Coordinates: 47°02′32.8″N 8°19′44.2″E

Website
- www.richard-wagner-museum.ch/home-en-us/

The Richard Wagner Museum is a cultural site in Lucerne, Switzerland, situated on the shore of Lake Lucerne in the district of Tribschen. The composer Richard Wagner lived here from 1866 to 1872; in 1933 it was opened as a museum.

== History ==
The building, a cube-shaped manor house on top of a small motte dates from the 15th century, was first inhabited by the Lords of Tripschen, with its current form established in 1623. It was purchased by the Am Rhyn family, patricians of Lucerne, in the late 18th century and remodeled into its present appearance. Wagner lived in the villa from April 1866, leasing it from Colonel Walter am Rhyn. The funds were provided to him by King Ludwig II of Bavaria, who had been forced by his government to banish the scandal-prone composer from Munich. The exasperated king visited his idol here incognito on May 22, 1866, accompanied only by his cabinet secretary Franz von Pfistermeister and a few servants. The enthusiastic but inexperienced 21-year-old king even considered abdicating, but Wagner, who was counting on his continued support, persuaded him to carry on.

Wagner completed here the operas Die Meistersinger von Nürnberg and Siegfried, and worked on Götterdämmerung.

Franz Liszt's daughter Cosima joined him, and Eva and Siegfried, children of Wagner and Cosima, were born here. Between 1866 and 1872, a peacock house was built for Cosima's peacocks. After Cosima's divorce from conductor Hans von Bülow, she and Wagner were married in Lucerne in 1870. It was also at Tribschen that he composed his Siegfried Idyll as a birthday gift to Cosima who had recently given birth to the couple's first legitimate child, a son named Siegfried. The couple had had two children while Cosima was still married to Bülow. The Siegfried Idyll was performed for the first time on Christmas morning, 25 December 1870, by an ensemble of fifteen players (among them Richter, Ruhoff, Rauchenecker and Kahl) on the stairs of the villa. It was a birthday present for Cosima; she had turned 33 the previous day, 24 December, but she always celebrated her birthday on Christmas Day. One of the guests present at this performance was the newly appointed 24-year-old professor of classical philology at the University of Basel, Friedrich Nietzsche.

Wagner moved to Bayreuth in 1872, planning to finally build his own theatre which he had been prevented from doing in Munich. With financial assistance from King Ludwig and nationwide fundraising, he finally succeeded in building the Bayreuth Festspielhaus. The Wagner family moved into Wahnfried House, constructed from 1872 to 1874.

Apart from occasionally being rented during the summer, the Tribschen house afterwards stood empty. In 1931 the house and surrounding parkland were purchased from the Am Rhyn family by the City of Lucerne. The villa was opened as a museum in 1933.

In 1938, the first Lucerne Festival began with a concert in the gardens of the villa, conducted by Arturo Toscanini. It included music by Wagner.

== Description ==
In five rooms of the ground floor there is an exhibition about the life and works of the composer, showing historical photographs, paintings, memorabilia and original manuscripts. There is the bronze bust of Wagner by Fritz Schaper, and the composer's Erard grand piano, made in 1858.

Cultural events may take place in the salon on the ground floor, such as chamber concerts in which Wagner's grand piano is played.

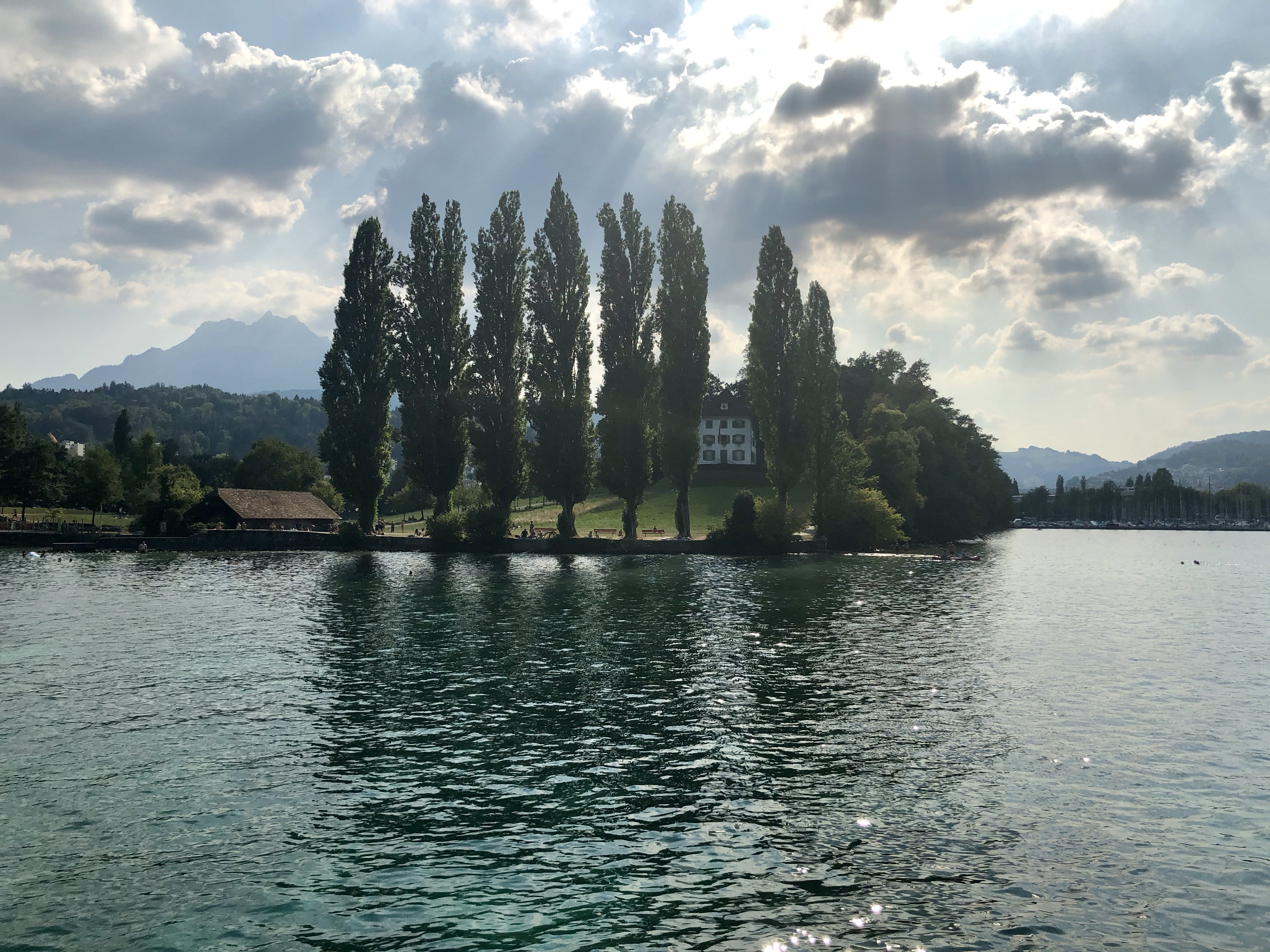

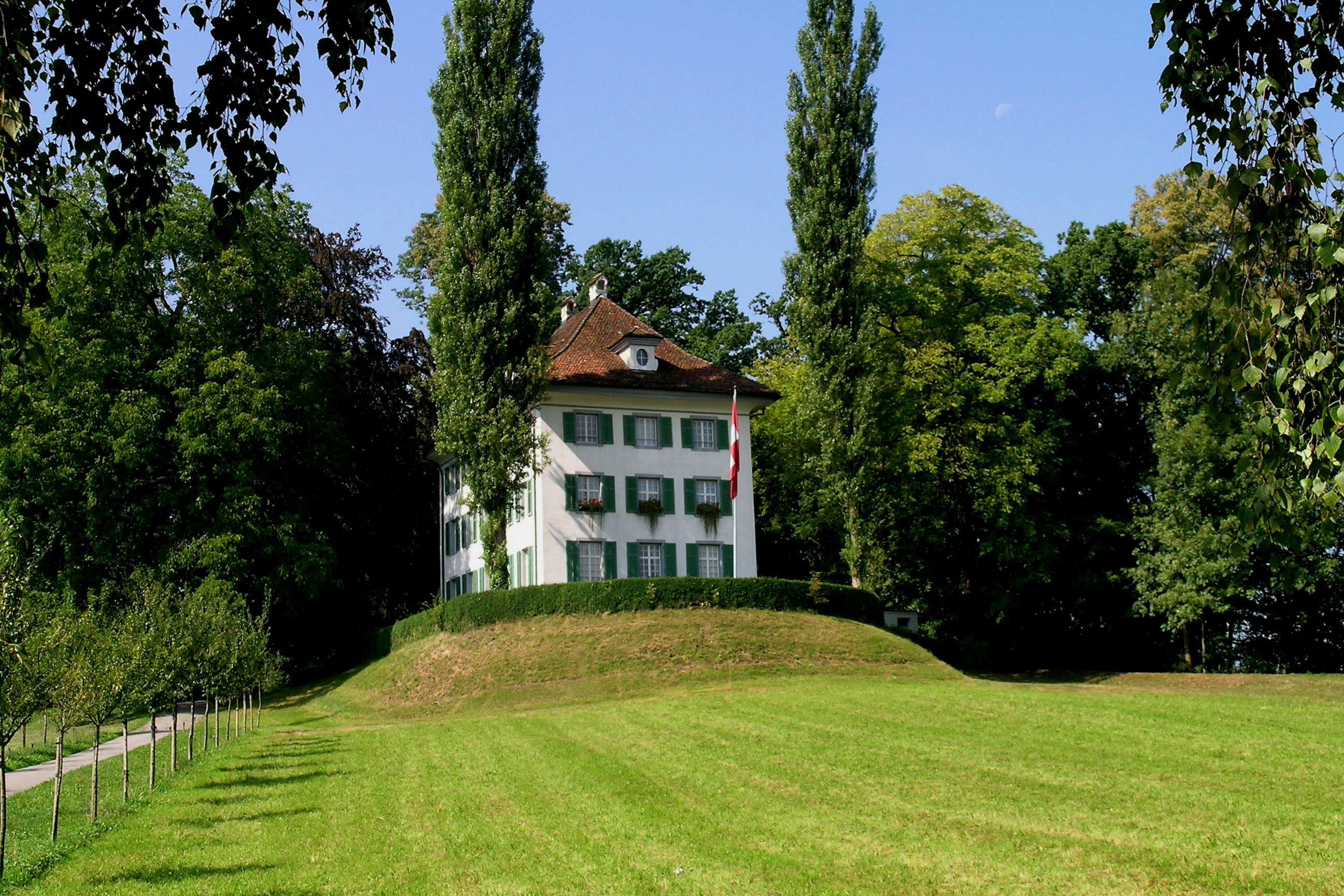

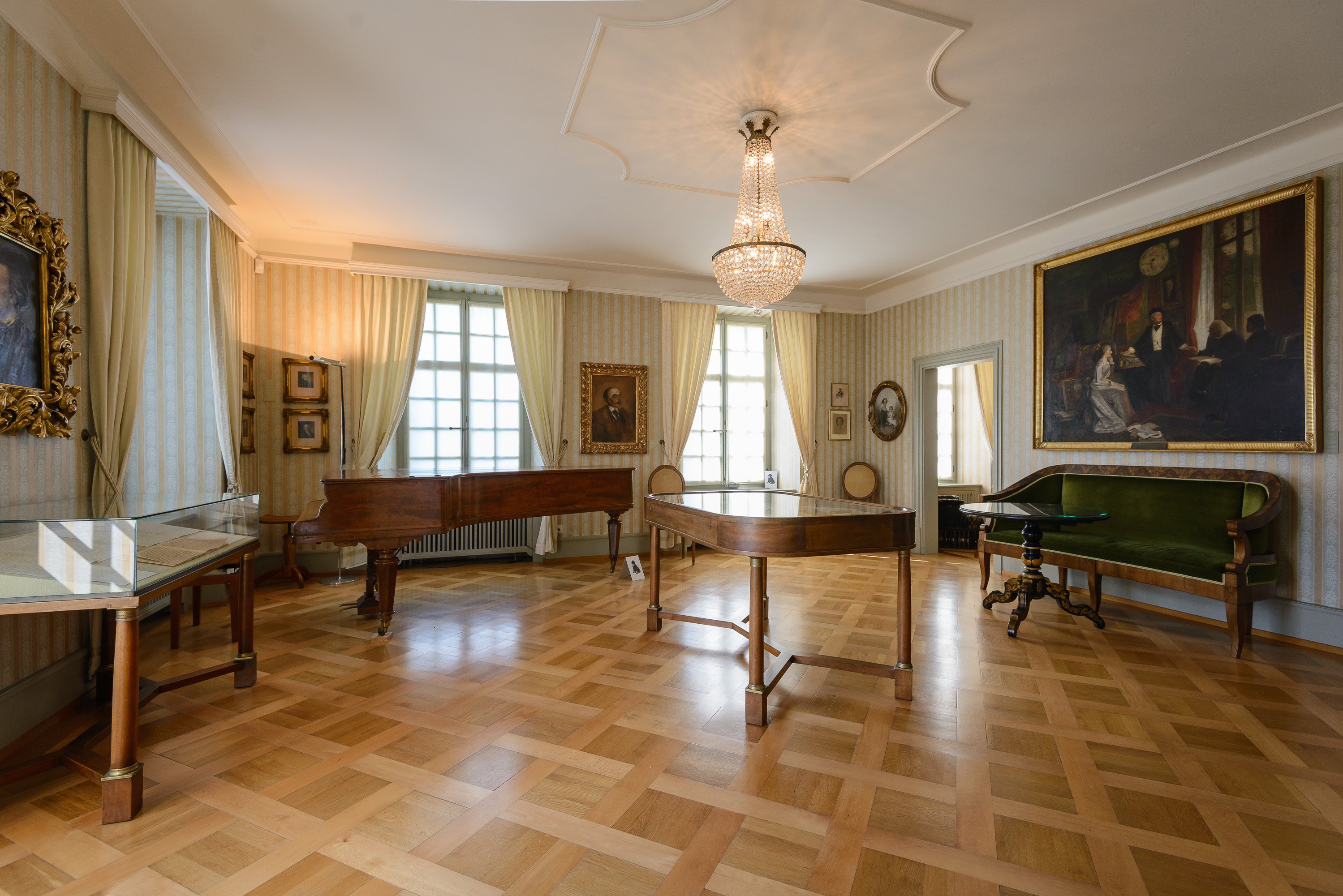

== See also ==
- List of music museums
- List of museums in Switzerland
