= Franz von Sonnenberg =

Swiss knight of Malta (1608–1682)

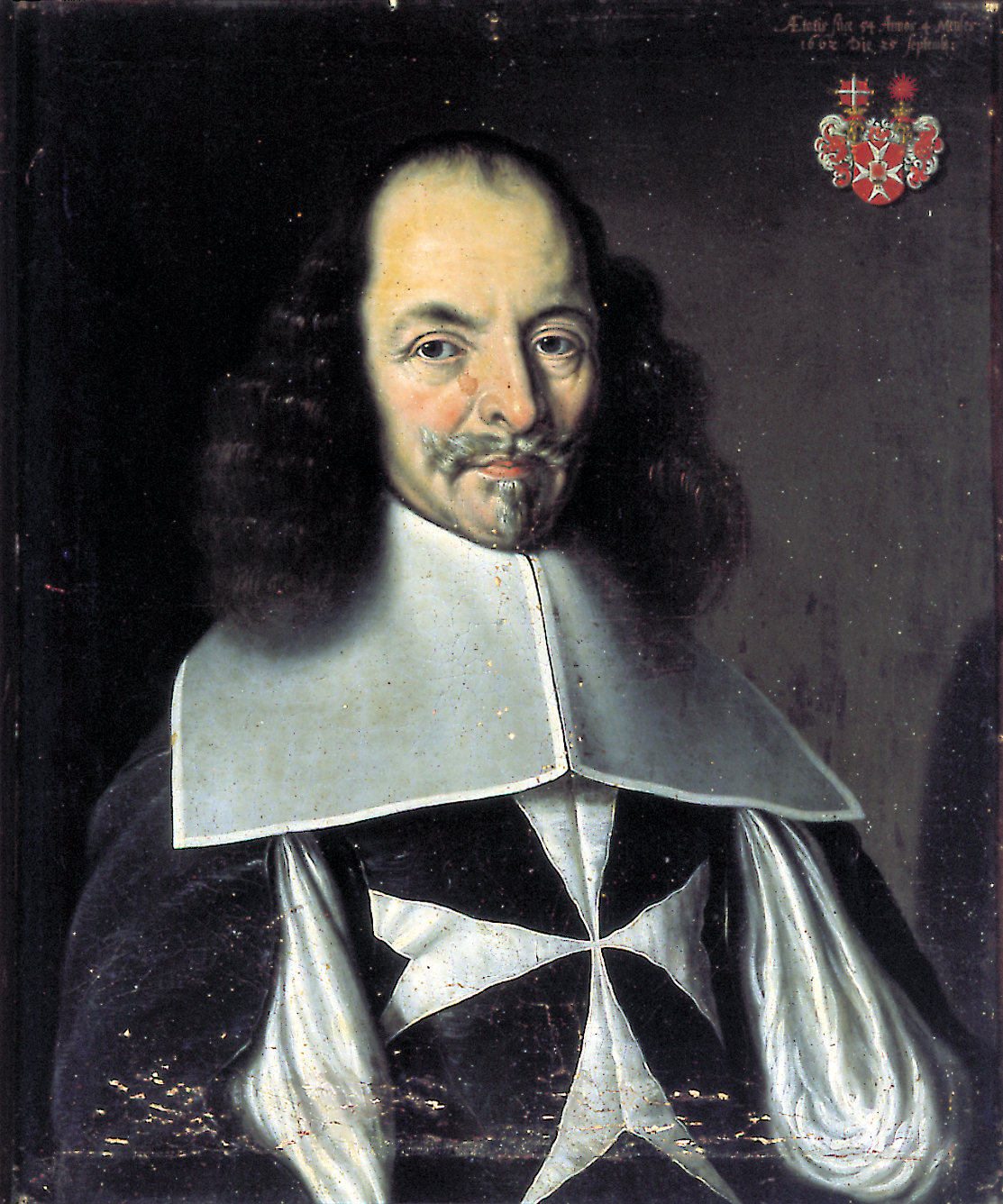
- Born: 26 May 1608; Lucerne, Old Swiss Confederacy
- Died: 10 October 1682 (aged 74); Leuggern, Old Swiss Confederacy

Franz von Sonnenberg (26 May 1608, Lucerne – 10 October 1682, Leuggern) was a Lucernese Knight of Malta who rose to become Grand Prior of Germany and Prince of Heitersheim.

== Biography ==
Franz von Sonnenberg was the son of Jakob von Sonnenberg and Anna Pfyffer von Wyher, and the half-brother of Ignaz Walter von Sonnenberg and Karl Emanuel von Sonnenberg. After attending the Jesuit college in Lucerne, he served until 1634 in the Swiss Guards in France, reaching the rank of captain in the company of his brother Alphons von Sonnenberg, and gained the confidence of Louis XIII. In 1630, he joined the Order of Malta, proving his nobility more helvetico (noble for three generations or eight quarters of nobility). In 1634, he extended this proof to four generations under imperial law (more germanico), placing him on equal footing with knights from the Holy Roman Empire. After completing a one-year novitiate and taking his vows, he was received as a knight in 1635.

From 1634 onward, he took part in a large number of caravans (war service on the order's galleys), including successful engagements against the Turks. A ship-shaped drinking vessel preserved at the Swiss National Museum, presented to his native city by Sonnenberg shortly before his death, commemorates these victories. He was entrusted with more than ten commanderies, sometimes important ones, including Leuggern-Klingnau (1648) and Hohenrain-Reiden (1649). He held the office of Grand Bailiff of Germany from 1650 to 1656, and bore the title of Grand Prior of Hungary from 1655. He was appointed Grand Prior of Germany in 1682 and in that capacity became Prince of Heitersheim (Breisgau). He died a few months later, without having had time to fully reorganize the commandery, which had suffered pillaging during the Thirty Years' War and whose castle and village had been burned by the French in 1675.

In 1680, Sonnenberg purchased the lordship of Kasteln (Alberswil) and established an entail (with right of primogeniture); the manor of Kasteln was still part of this entail in the early 21st century. He was regarded as a virtuous, intelligent, duty-conscious, modest, and amiable man.

== Bibliography ==
- F. Peter, Franz von Sonnenberg, 1977.
