= Joseph Amrhyn (Swiss politician) =

Swiss politician and officer (1589–1645)

- Born: 9 September 1589; Lucerne, Old Swiss Confederacy
- Died: 6 September 1645 (aged 55); Lucerne, Old Swiss Confederacy
- Occupations: Politician; military officer
- Spouse: Susanna Zurgilgen
- Children: Joseph Amrhyn; Beat Amrhyn
- Father: Walther Amrhyn
- Relatives: Ludwig Amrhyn (brother)

Joseph Amrhyn (9 September 1589 – 6 September 1645) was a Swiss politician and officer from Lucerne, a member of the Amrhyn family. He sat in the Small Council of Lucerne from 1635 to 1645 and was bailiff of Baden, Weggis and Büron. In the service of the Duke of Savoy he was chamberlain and cupbearer, captain in the ducal bodyguard in Turin and, in 1638, a colonel.

== Biography ==
Joseph Amrhyn was born on 9 September 1589 in Lucerne, the son of Walther Amrhyn. His brother was Ludwig Amrhyn. He married Susanna Zurgilgen, daughter of Melchior Zurgilgen, a treasurer (Säckelmeister). His sons were Joseph and the Jesuit Beat.

From 1608 Amrhyn was a member of the Grand Council (Grossrat) of Lucerne, and from 1635 to 1645 of the Small Council (Kleinrat). He was bailiff (Vogt) of Baden from 1619 to 1621, of Weggis from 1625 to 1627 and of Büron from 1633 to 1635. In 1634 he was commander of the Catholic troops in Baden. He was also administrator (Pfleger) of Blatten, in the municipality of Malters, and of Werthenstein.

In 1608 Amrhyn became chamberlain and cupbearer (Kammerherr und Mundschenk) to the Duke of Savoy, and in 1610 captain in the duke's bodyguard in Turin. In 1638 he was a colonel in Savoy. His conduct at the surrender of Turin in 1639, during the dispute over the Savoyard succession, led to an investigation before the council of Lucerne. In 1608 he was made a knight of the Order of Saints Maurice and Lazarus. He died in Lucerne on 6 September 1645.

== Bibliography ==
- K. Messmer and P. Hoppe, Luzerner Patriziat, 1976
