= Tribschen =

Coordinates: 47°02′28.27″N 8°19′41.33″E

- Interactive map of Tribschen
- Country: Switzerland
- City: Lucerne
- Canton: Lucerne

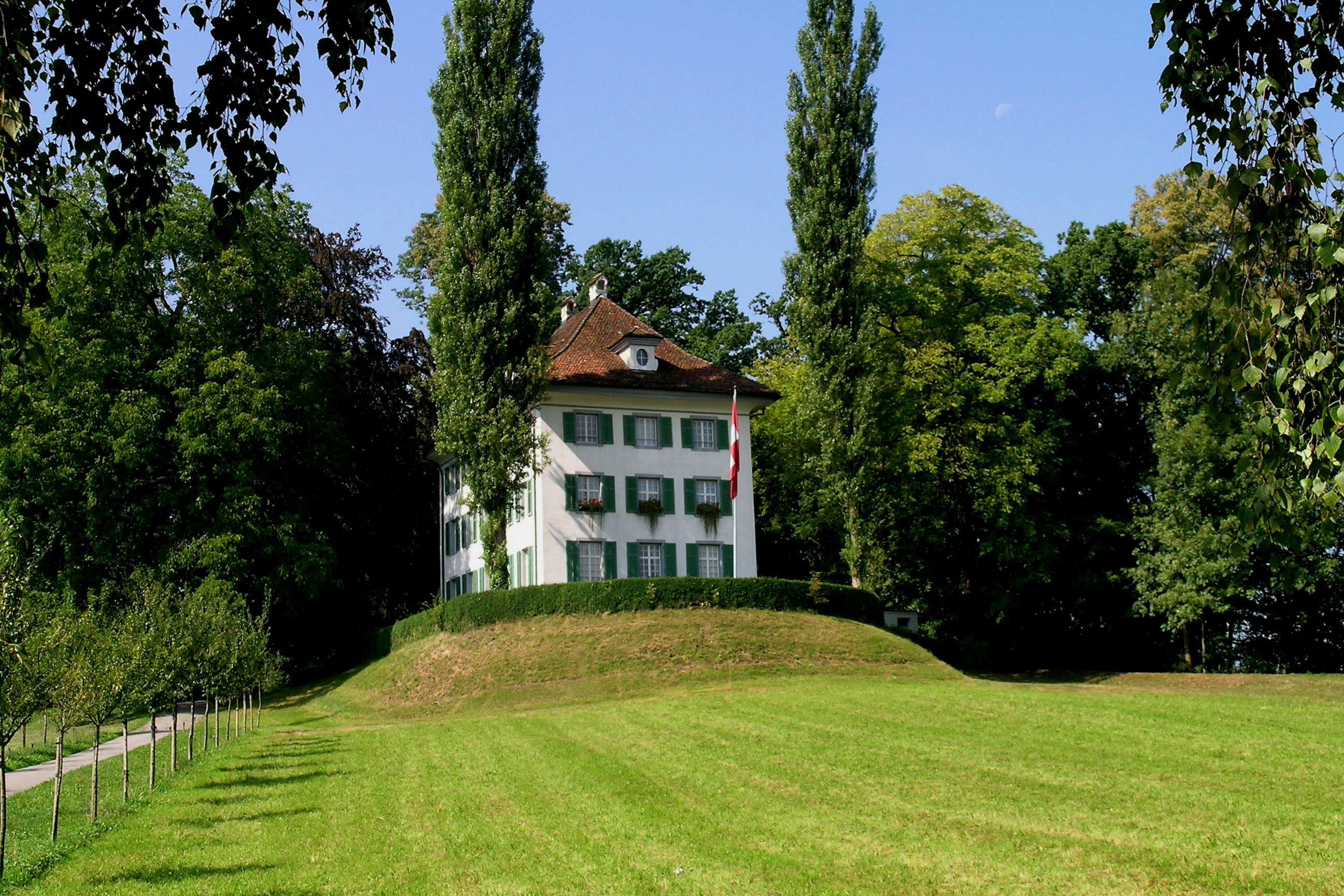
The home of Richard Wagner; now a museum

Tribschen (also seen as Triebschen) is a district of the city of Lucerne, in the Canton of Lucerne in central Switzerland.

Tribschen is best known today as the home of the German composer Richard Wagner from 30 March 1866 to 22 April 1872. When Wagner was obliged to leave Munich in March 1866, he moved to a spacious villa in Tribschen on a headland projecting into Lake Lucerne. The cube-shaped manor house on a small motte originally dates back to the 15th century and was first inhabited by the Lords of Tripschen. The basic form of the building was established in 1623. Around 1800, it was acquired by the Lucerne patrician family am Rhyn and remodeled into its present form. Wagner lived in the villa from April 1866, leasing it from Colonel Walter am Rhyn. The funds were provided to him by King Ludwig Ludwig II of Bavaria, who had been forced by his government to banish the scandal-prone composer from Munich. The exasperated king visited his idol here incognito on May 22, 1866, accompanied only by his cabinet secretary Franz von Pfistermeister and a few servants. The enthusiastic but inexperienced 20-year-old king even considered abdicating, but Wagner, who was counting on his continued support, persuaded him to carry on.

It was while he was living here that Wagner completed the score of Die Meistersinger von Nürnberg, composed his Kaisermarsch and the third act of Siegfried, and began Götterdämmerung.

Between 1866 and 1872, a peacock house was built for Cosima Wagner's peacocks. It was also at Tribschen that Wagner composed his Siegfried Idyll as a birthday gift to Cosima, his second wife who had recently given birth to the couple's first legitimate child, a son named Siegfried. The couple had had two children while Cosima was married to conductor Hans von Bülow. The Siegfried Idyll was performed for the first time on Christmas morning, 25 December 1870, by an ensemble of fifteen players (among them Richter, Ruhoff, Rauchenecker and Kahl) on the stairs of the villa. It was a birthday present for Cosima; she had turned 33 the previous day, 24 December, but she always celebrated her birthday on Christmas Day. One of the guests present at this performance was the newly appointed 24-year-old professor of classical philology at the University of Basel, Friedrich Nietzsche.

Today the villa is the Richard Wagner Museum.

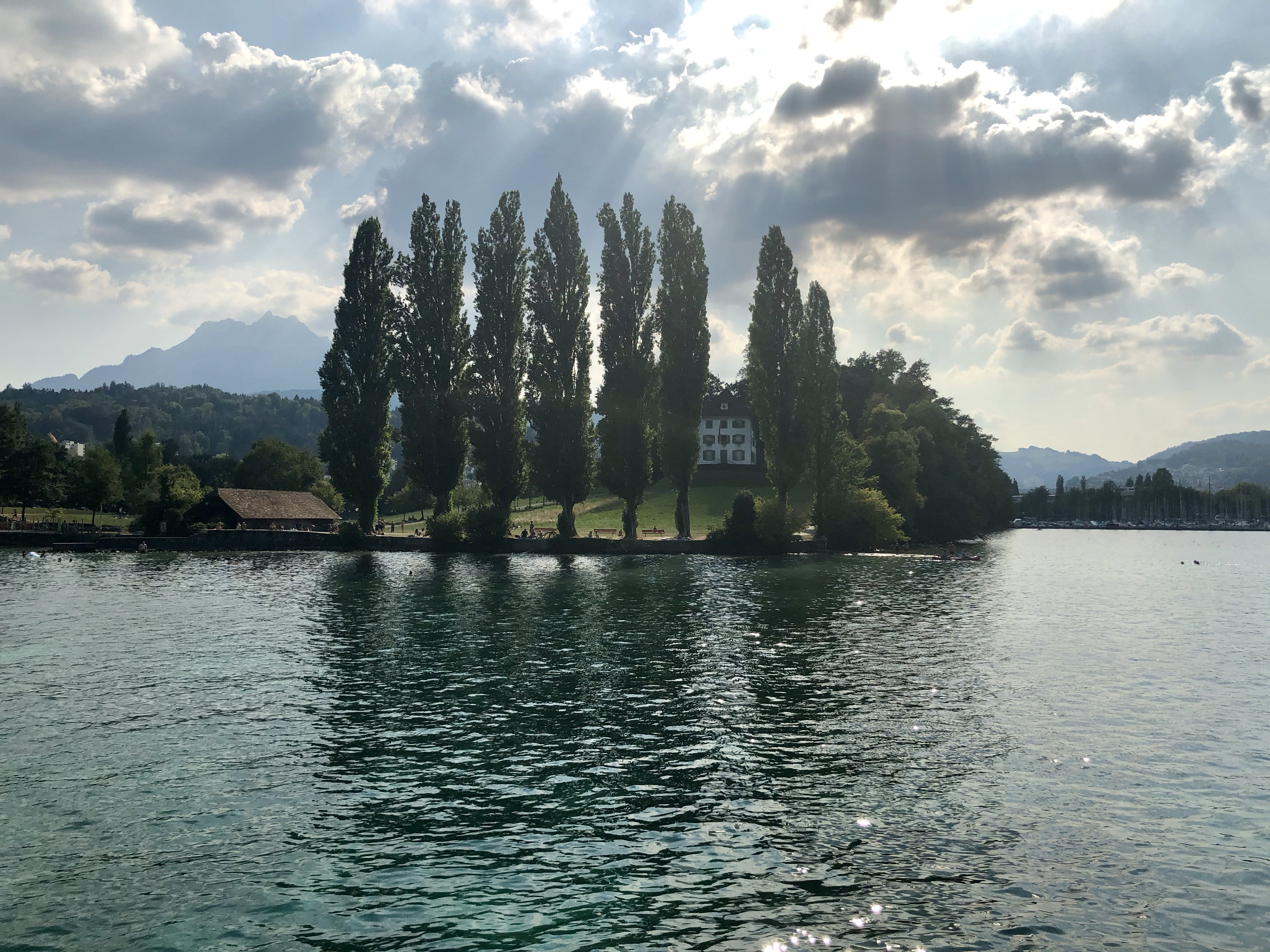

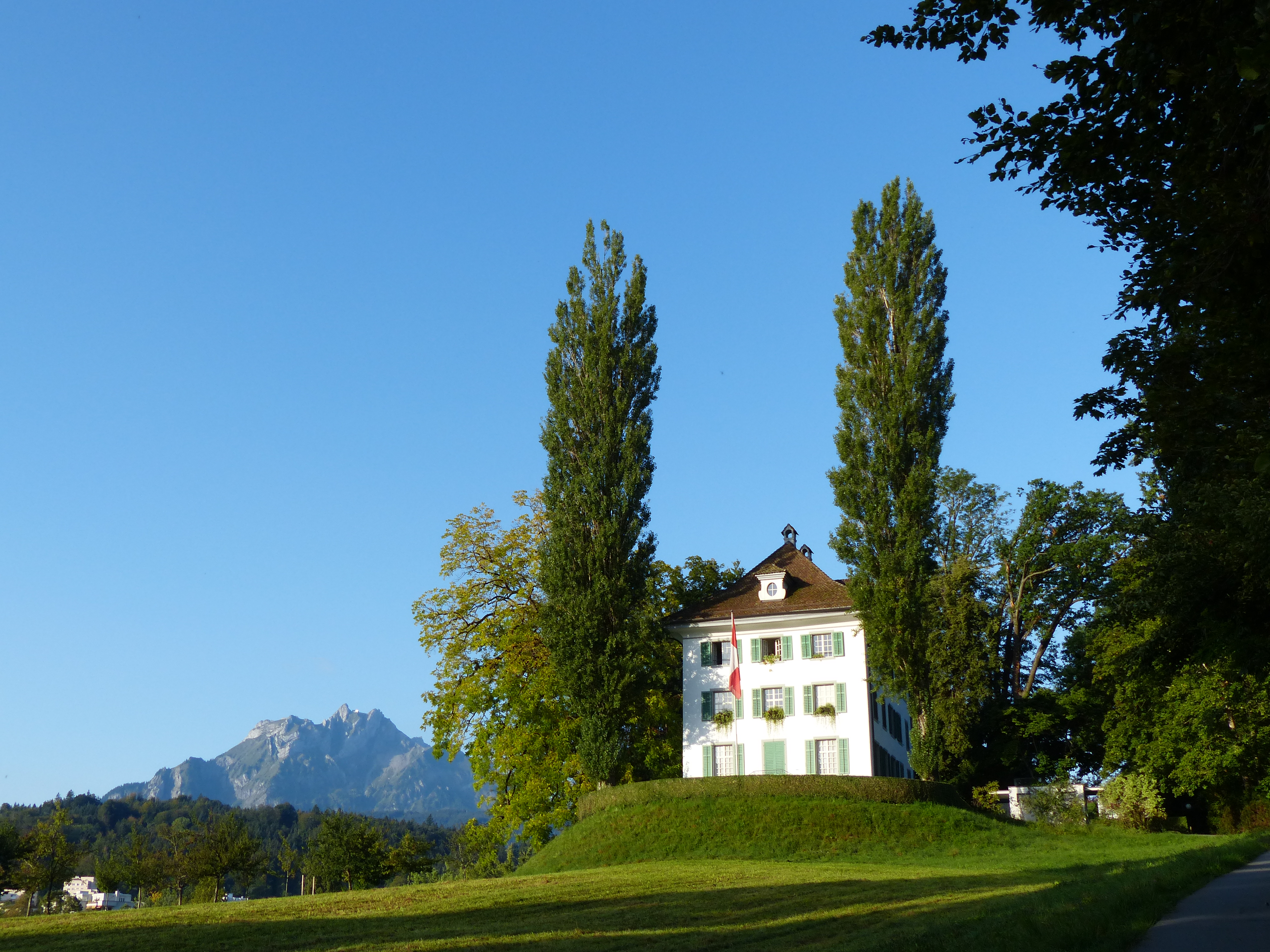

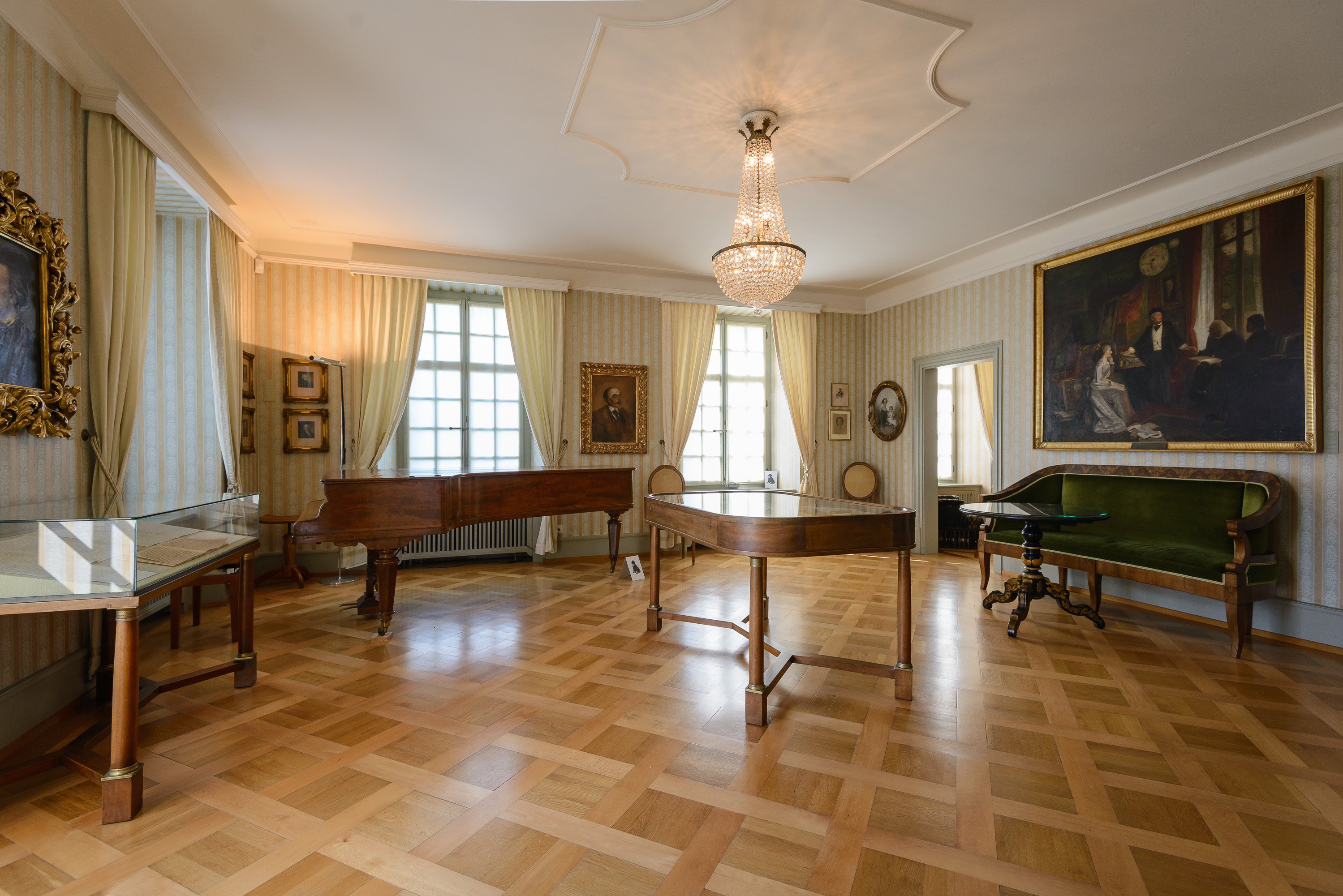
