= Karl Anton Amrhyn =

Swiss politician and military officer

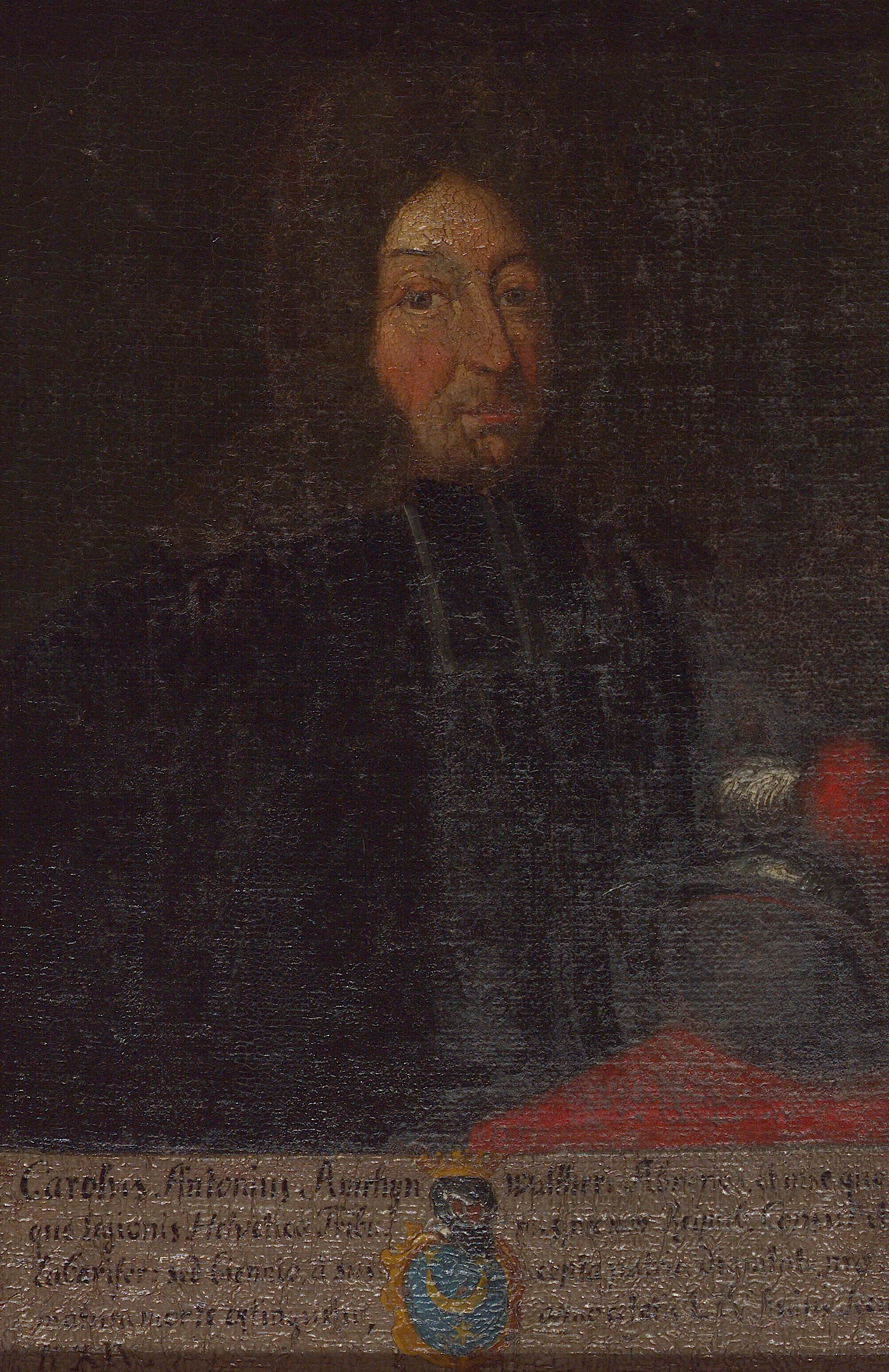
- Born: 2 July 1660; Lucerne, Swiss Confederation
- Died: 16 June 1714 (aged 53); Lucerne, Swiss Confederation

Karl Anton Amrhyn (2 July 1660 – 16 June 1714) was a Lucerne politician and military officer who served as Avoyer of Lucerne in 1713–1714.

== Life ==
Karl Anton Amrhyn was born in Lucerne on 2 July 1660. He was the son of Joseph Amrhyn and the brother of Franz Xaver Amrhyn. In 1682 he married Anna Maria von Sonnenberg, daughter of Alphons von Sonnenberg. He was educated by the Jesuits in Lucerne from 1668 to 1677, then at the Collegio dei Nobili in Parma, with subsequent stays in Savoy and France.

== Political and military career ==
Amrhyn became a member of the Grand Council from 1680 and of the Small Council from 1693, and served as Avoyer in 1713–1714. He held the positions of bailiff of Knutwil (1683–1685), captain at Wil (1687–1689), bailiff of Thurgau (1702–1704) and of Merenschwand (1707–1709 and 1711–1713). He was a member of the Secret War Council from 1696, responsible for border affairs from 1703, and a delegate to the Federal Diet from 1700.

Amrhyn had a distinguished military career: in the service of Spain, he commanded a regiment in the Milanese under Philip V. Together with his brother Jost, he led the pro-Spanish faction in Lucerne.

== Bibliography ==
- Marbacher, J.: Schultheiss Karl Anton am Rhyn von Luzern und seine Zeit (1660–1714), 1953.
