= Beat Amrhyn =

Swiss Jesuit mathematician (1632–1673)

- Born: 31 October 1632; Lucerne, Old Swiss Confederacy
- Died: 15 April 1673 (aged 40); At sea, off the coast of Guinea
- Occupations: Jesuit priest; mathematician
- Father: Joseph Amrhyn
- Relatives: Joseph Amrhyn (brother)

Beat Amrhyn (31 October 1632 – 15 April 1673) was a Swiss Jesuit priest and mathematician from Lucerne, a member of the Amrhyn family. He taught mathematics, philosophy and scholastic theology at the University of Ingolstadt. Chosen as a gifted mathematician for the imperial court in Beijing, he lectured in Portugal while waiting to sail, and died on the voyage off the coast of Guinea.

== Biography ==
Beat Amrhyn was born on 31 October 1632 in Lucerne, the son of Joseph Amrhyn. His brother was Joseph Amrhyn.

In 1649 Amrhyn entered the Jesuit order at Landsberg am Lech, and in 1661 he was ordained a priest in Eichstätt. He taught at the Jesuit colleges of Konstanz and Dillingen. At the University of Ingolstadt he was professor of mathematics in 1661–1662, lecturer in philosophy from 1663 to 1666 and lecturer in scholastic theology from 1666 to 1671.

Amrhyn had been chosen as a gifted mathematician for the imperial court in Beijing, and on his departure from the Bavarian state university he was honored in speeches and writings. While waiting in Portugal, he lectured in Évora and, in 1672–1673, at the University of Coimbra. He died on 15 April 1673 during the voyage to East Asia, off the coast of Guinea.

== Bibliography ==
- Dictionnaire d'histoire et de géographie ecclésiastiques, 2, 1366
- Helvetia Sacra, VII
- F. Strobel, Schweizer Jesuitenlexikon, manuscript, 1986, 29
