= Baden Articles =

1834 Swiss conference resolutions

The Baden Articles were a series of fourteen resolutions adopted at a conference held in Baden from 20 to 27 January 1834, which proposed reforms to the relationship between the Catholic Church and the Swiss cantons. The articles sought greater independence of bishops from the Pope, increased state oversight of Church affairs, and various administrative reforms. They were condemned by papal encyclical in 1835 and became a major catalyst for the confessional conflicts that ultimately led to the Sonderbund War.

== Background ==
On 30 December 1833, at the instigation of Eduard Pfyffer of Lucerne and Gallus Jakob Baumgartner of St. Gallen, the liberal government of Lucerne convened a conference in Baden to regulate relations between Church and State. The conference was intended to include deputies from cantons belonging to the dioceses of Basel, St. Gall, and Chur.

Delegates from the cantons of Berne, Lucerne, St. Gallen, Solothurn, Basel-Landschaft, Aargau, and Thurgau met in the spa town from 20 to 27 January 1834. Zurich, Zug, and the Grisons sent no representatives.

== Content ==
The conference initially produced a demand to the Holy See to elevate the Diocese of Basel to the rank of archdiocese. In case of refusal, the signatories reserved the right to attach Swiss dioceses to a foreign archdiocese.

The fourteen additional resolutions constituted the Articles de Baden proper. They proposed greater independence of bishops from the Pope, state oversight and control over Church affairs, as well as over seminaries and religious orders, taxation of convents, guarantee of mixed marriages, and limitation of religious holidays. Drafted under the influence of the liberal clergy and viewed by emerging radicalism as a means to combat the "despotism of the Church," the Articles de Baden were condemned by the papal encyclical of 17 May 1835.

== Adoption ==
The articles were adopted only by the liberal cantons: Lucerne, St. Gallen, Thurgau, Aargau, Basel-Landschaft, and Zurich. Solothurn rejected them, while Berne postponed its decision.

== Consequences ==
The articles provoked extremely violent criticism, especially in the Catholic camp, and even led to the creation of associations that exploited the theme of "religion in danger." The Aargau government resorted to arms in 1835 in the districts of Muri and Bremgarten. Berne did likewise against the Jura in 1836, which facilitated the interference of foreign powers.

During the Regeneration period, the Articles de Baden marked the beginning of the confessionalization of political struggles that would lead to the Sonderbund War.
