= Eduard Pfyffer =

Swiss politician (1782–1834)

- Portrait by Philipp Jakob Schwegler
- Born: 13 October 1782; Rome, Papal States
- Died: 11 December 1834 (aged 52); Olten, Solothurn, Switzerland
- Occupations: Lawyer, politician
- Spouse: Maria Anna Schobinger (m. 1813)
- Parents: Franz Ludwig Pfyffer (father); Aloisia Reding (mother)
- Relatives: Casimir Pfyffer (brother); Karl Josef Reding (grandfather)

Eduard Pfyffer (also Eduard Pfyffer von Altishofen; 13 October 1782 – 11 December 1834) was a Swiss politician from Lucerne, a member of the Pfyffer family. He sat in Lucerne's Grand Council and Small Council from 1814 to 1834, was repeatedly an envoy to the Federal Diet, and was Schultheiss in 1832. He had a major influence on education in the canton: he initiated the reforms of the Lucerne lyceum (Höhere Lehranstalt), created the education law of 1830, expanded the rural schools and founded the cantonal library. He represented liberalism under the Restoration regime and was one of the leading politicians of the early Regeneration period. In 1834 he was co-initiator and president of the Baden Conference.

== Biography ==
Eduard Pfyffer was born on 13 October 1782 in Rome, the son of Franz Ludwig Pfyffer, a captain of the papal guard, and Aloisia Reding. His brother was Casimir Pfyffer, and his grandfather was Karl Josef Reding. In 1813 he married Maria Anna Schobinger, daughter of Martin Schobinger, warehouse master (Sustmeister) of Lucerne.

In 1800–1801 Pfyffer was the Helvetic war commissary (Kriegskommissär) for the district of Lucerne. From 1803 he handled the legal business of the Gloggner firm; in 1810 he obtained his Lucerne lawyer's license and opened a law office of his own. From 1814 to 1834 he was a member of Lucerne's Grand Council (Grosser Rat) and Small Council (Kleiner Rat). He was district governor (Oberamtmann) of the Entlebuch in 1814–1817, a judge at the court of appeal (Appellationsrat) in 1817–1820, several times an envoy to the Federal Diet (Tagsatzung) between 1817 and 1833, Oberamtmann of Lucerne in 1821–1827, and Schultheiss in 1832.

Pfyffer had a major influence on education. He was a member of the education council (Erziehungsrat) in 1817–1821 and from 1827, rapporteur for the rural schools from 1818, president of the school commission in 1818–1821 and 1830, and president of the school directorate from 1831. At the Lucerne lyceum (Höhere Lehranstalt) he initiated the reforms of 1819 and 1828 and, from 1831, the renewal of the teaching staff. He created the education law of 1830 and expanded the rural school system. He founded the cantonal library and was president of the library commission in 1832–1834. His bourgeois and secular concept of education provoked resistance on the Catholic conservative side.

Pfyffer represented liberalism under the Restoration regime and was one of the leading politicians of the early Regeneration period. In 1832–1833 he took part in drafting the Federal Charter (Bundesurkunde). As an advocate of liberal state churchmanship (Staatskirchentum) he took part in the reorganization of the Diocese of Basel, and in 1834 he was co-initiator and president of the Baden Conference. He was a member of various societies, among them the Swiss Society for Public Utility and the Helvetic Society. He died on 11 December 1834 in Olten, while passing through.

== Bibliography ==
- R. Bussmann, Luzerner Grossratsbiographien (Staatsarchiv Luzern)
- A. Häfliger, Schultheiss Eduard Pfyffer, 1782–1834: Förderer des Luzerner Schulwesens, 1975 (with a list of works)

=== Archives ===
- Zentral- und Hochschulbibliothek Luzern, Lucerne: personal papers (Nachlass)
