= Wyher Castle =

Castle in Ettiswil, Switzerland

- Ettiswil
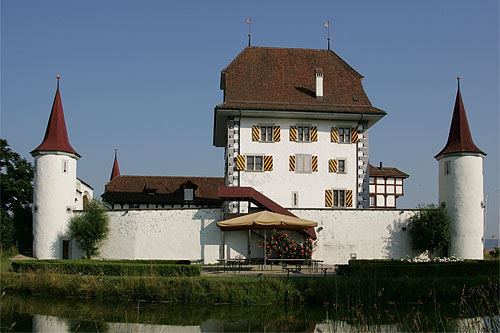
- Wyher Castle

Site information
- Type: Water castle
- Code: CH-LU
- Condition: preserved

Location
- Coordinates: 47°8′31.3″N 8°1′25.6″E
- Height: 524 m above the sea

Site history
- Built: 1304 first mentioned

Wyher Castle is a moated castle, which lies south of the village center of Ettiswil in the Canton of Lucerne in Switzerland. It was first mentioned in 1304 as the home of the Freiherr von Wediswil. After passing through several owners, around the end of the 15th century it was acquired by the Feer family. Around 1510, Petermann Feer rebuilt it into a late-Gothic castle. In 1588 it was inherited by Ludwig Pfyffer von Altishofen, whose descendants adopted the name Pfyffer von Wyher. Between 1837 and 1964 it was owned by the Hüsler family, who were local farmers.

In 1964 a fire partially destroyed the castle and it was acquired by the canton. Renovations in 1981–83 and 1992–96 repaired the damage and restored the moat. In 1996 it became a museum, housing the Josef Zihlmann collection of local religious art.

== See also ==
- List of castles in Switzerland
