= Joseph Amrhyn =

Swiss Jesuit priest (1717–1795)

- Born: 23 December 1717; Lucerne, Swiss Confederation
- Died: late October 1795; Hochdorf

Joseph Amrhyn (23 December 1717 – late October 1795) was a Swiss Jesuit priest and rector of the Jesuit college of Lucerne. He was born in Lucerne into the patrician Amrhyn family, the son of Joseph Cölestin Amrhyn, a member of the Small Council, grandson of Karl Anton Amrhyn, and brother of Walter Ludwig Leonz Amrhyn.

== Biography ==
Amrhyn entered the Society of Jesus in 1733 and was ordained priest in 1748. He subsequently taught at Jesuit colleges in Hall, Konstanz, Ellwangen, and Kaufbeuren in Germany, and was regarded as an excellent preacher.

He served as rector of the Jesuit college of Lucerne for two terms (1764–1767 and 1770–1774). Following the suppression of the Society of Jesus, he was required to hand over the college's property to the state on 17 January 1774. Administrative authority passed to the city of Lucerne, but Amrhyn remained for a further year as vice-superior, continuing to exercise spiritual and temporal direction of the Xaverian house — the new gymnasium — until 1775. In 1775, he received the prosperous benefice of Hochdorf.

== Bibliography ==
- HS, VII, 159–160
- D. Leisibach, Die Aufhebung des Luzerner Jesuitenkollegiums, 1978
- F. Strobel, Schweizer Jesuitenlexikon, ms., 1986, p. 30
