= Pfyffer =

Swiss family name

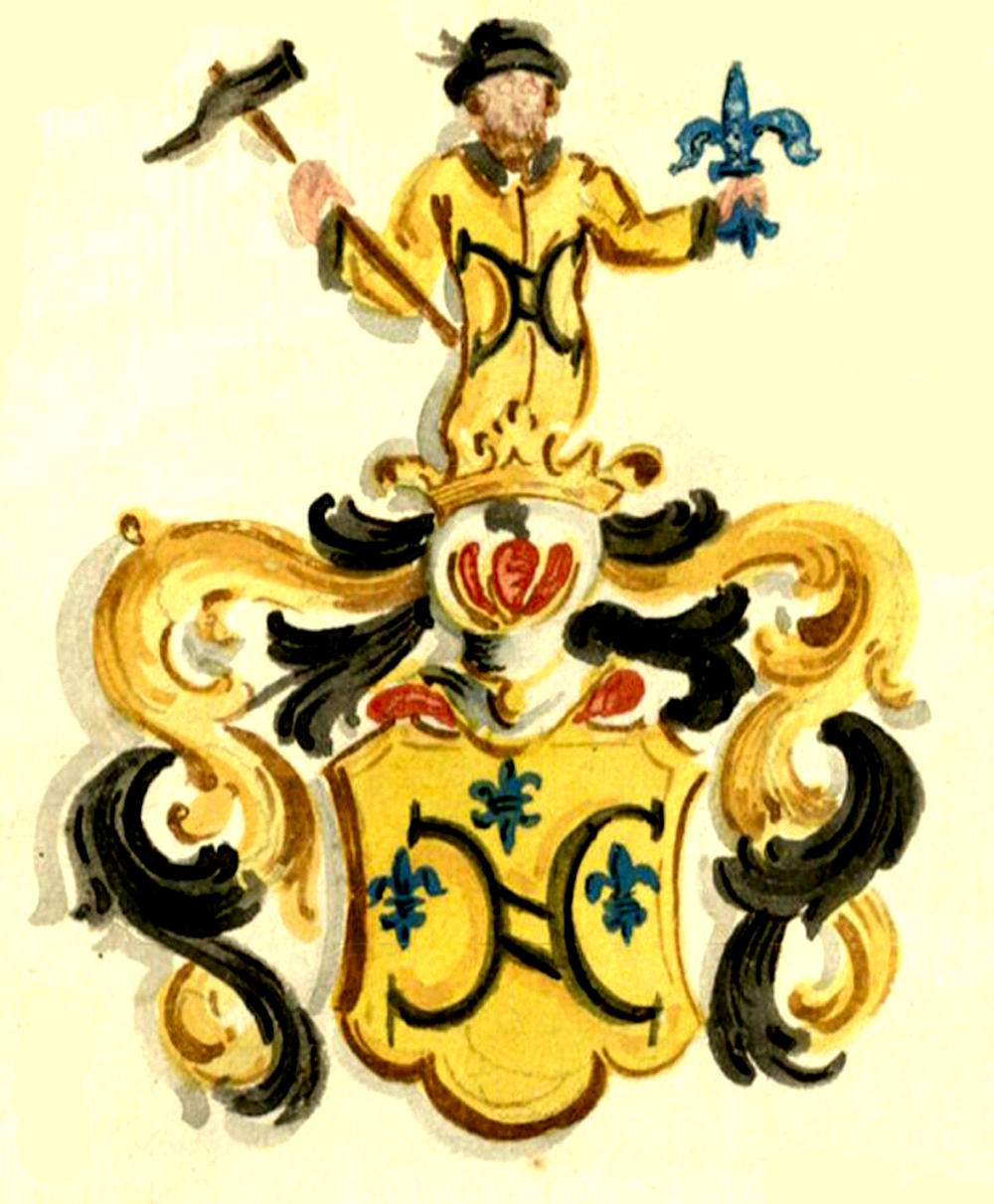
Coat of arms of the Pfyffer von Altishofen family

Pfyffer is a Swiss family and surname, originally members of the patriciate of the city of Lucerne. Several generations of representatives of this family (11 in total between 1652 and 1982) were commanders of the Pontifical Swiss Guard, The Pfyffer family was the most powerful family in Lucerne during the early modern period. In the later 16th century it was divided into the lineages Pfyffer von Altishofen, Pfyffer von Wyher and Pfyffer von Heidegg after their respective seats in Altishofen, Wyher (Ettiswil) and Heidegg (Hitzkirch). The two latter branches are extinct and the modern Pfyffer surname indicates membership in the Pfyffer von Altishofen family.

The family is descended from Johannes Pfyffer, who received Lucerne citizenship in 1483 and was a member of the lesser city council from 1508, and his son Leodegar Pfyffer, who was the treasurer of Lucerne. One of Leodegar's four sons was Ludwig Pfyffer (1524–1594) who established Lucerne as the leading Catholic canton in the reaction to the Swiss Reformation. Ludwig Pfyffer had substantial political and military influence both in Switzerland and France, and was popularly called the "king of the Swiss". He was also the architect of his family's lasting influence in Lucerne.

Commanders of the Pontifical Swiss Guard:

- 10. Johann Rudolf Pfyffer von Altishofen (1652–1657)
- 11. Ludwig Pfyffer von Altishofen (1658–1686)
- 12. Franz Pfyffer von Altishofen (1686–1696)
- 14. Johann Konrad Pfyffer von Altishofen (1712–1727)
- 15. Franz Ludwig Pfyffer von Altishofen (1727–1754)
- 16. Jost Ignaz Pfyffer von Altishofen (1754–1782)
- 17. Franz Alois Pfyffer von Altishofen (1783–1798)
- 18. Karl Leodegar Pfyffer von Altishofen (1800–1834)
- 19. Martin Pfyffer von Altishofen (1835–1847)
- 27. Heinrich Pfyffer von Altishofen (1942–1957)
- 29. Franz Pfyffer von Altishofen (1972–1982)

Other notable people with the name:

- Ludwig Pfyffer (1524–1594), Lucerne political and military leader, central figure of Swiss Counter-Reformation
- Kaspar Pfyffer (1524–1616), Lucerne merchant, politician, and benefactor of the Wesemlin Capuchin monastery
- Rudolf Pfyffer von Altishofen (1545–1630), Lucerne politician, colonel in French service, and captain of the Swiss Guards of the Duke of Lorraine
- Jost Pfyffer (died 1584), Lucerne merchant, politician and avoyer
- Jost Pfyffer (1531–1610), Lucerne merchant, politician and avoyer
- Franz Ludwig Pfyffer (1716–1802), Lucerne officer, politician and topographer, Lieutenant General in French service. Inventor of the relief map.
- Alphons Pfyffer von Heidegg (1753–1822), Lucerne officer and politician, member of the Directory of the Helvetic Republic
- Eduard Pfyffer (1782–1834), Lucerne lawyer and politician
- Casimir Pfyffer (1794–1875), Swiss politician and jurist, mayor of Lucerne, President of the Swiss National Council and President of the Federal Supreme Court
- Alphons Maximilian Pfyffer von Altishofen (1834–1890), Swiss architect and military Chief of Staff

== See also ==
- List of commanders of the Pontifical Swiss Guard
