= Karl Josef Reding =

Swiss officer in Spanish service (1713–1761)

- Born: 20 November 1713; Schwyz, Old Swiss Confederacy
- Died: 18 July 1761 (aged 47); Tortosa, Catalonia, Spain
- Occupation: Military officer
- Spouses: Maria Barbara Nideröst; Maria Anna Louise Balthasar
- Parents: Wolfgang Theodor Reding (father); Anna Katharina Dorer (mother)
- Relatives: Josef Ulrich Reding (brother); Franz Anton Reding (brother); Eduard Pfyffer (grandson)

Karl Josef Reding (also Karl Josef Reding von Biberegg; 20 November 1713 – 18 July 1761) was a Swiss officer in Spanish service from Schwyz. He was bailiff of Gaster from 1740 to 1742, and from 1742 to 1749 and from 1758 to 1761 he was colonel and proprietor of the Jung-Reding regiment in Spain. He rose to the ranks of brigadier and maréchal de camp.

== Biography ==
Karl Josef Reding was born on 20 November 1713 in Schwyz, the son of Wolfgang Theodor Reding, a guard captain (Gardehauptmann) and banner bearer (Pannerherr), and Anna Katharina Dorer. His brothers were Josef Ulrich Reding and Franz Anton Reding. He held the title of baron. He married first Maria Barbara Nideröst and then Maria Anna Louise Balthasar from Lucerne. His grandson was Eduard Pfyffer.

From 1740 to 1742 Reding was bailiff (Landvogt) in the Gaster. He was a captain in Spanish service, and from 1742 to 1749 and from 1758 to 1761 colonel and proprietor (Inhaber) of the Jung-Reding regiment in Spain. He attained the ranks of brigadier and maréchal de camp. He died on 18 July 1761 in Tortosa in Catalonia.

== Bibliography ==
- J. J. Kubly-Müller, Familienbuch Reding, manuscript, 1927, no. 160 (Schwyz State Archives, FamA 23)
- J. Wiget, Von Haudegen und Staatsmännern, 2007, 273, 280
