= Ludwig Amrhyn =

Swiss politician and military officer

- Born: 1 May 1593; Lucerne, Old Swiss Confederacy
- Died: 4 October 1665 (aged 72); Lucerne, Old Swiss Confederacy
- Spouses: Anastasia zur Gilgen; Anna Maria Helmlin
- Father: Walther Amrhyn

Ludwig Amrhyn (1 May 1593 – 4 October 1665) was a Lucerne politician and military officer in the service of Savoy.

== Life and career ==
The son of Walther Amrhyn, Ludwig was born in Lucerne on 1 May 1593. He married twice: first Anastasia zur Gilgen, then Anna Maria Helmlin. In 1612, he made a pilgrimage to Jerusalem, where he was knighted as a Knight of the Holy Sepulchre and of Mount Saint Catherine.

He was admitted to the Grand Council of Lucerne from 1635 and served in the Small Council from 1646 to 1665. He served as bailiff (Vogt) of Wikon (1641–1647) and of Entlebuch (1647–1649 and 1651–1653).

From 1618 he served in the military forces of Savoy. In 1638 he held the rank of lieutenant-colonel in the regiment of his brother Joseph Amrhyn, and in 1648 he was appointed captain of the ducal guard.

== Bibliography ==
- J. Marbacher, Schultheiss K.A. am Rhyn von Luzern und seine Zeit, 1953
- K. Messmer, P. Hoppe, Luzerner Patriziat, 1976
