= Siegfried Idyll =

Symphonic poem by Richard Wagner

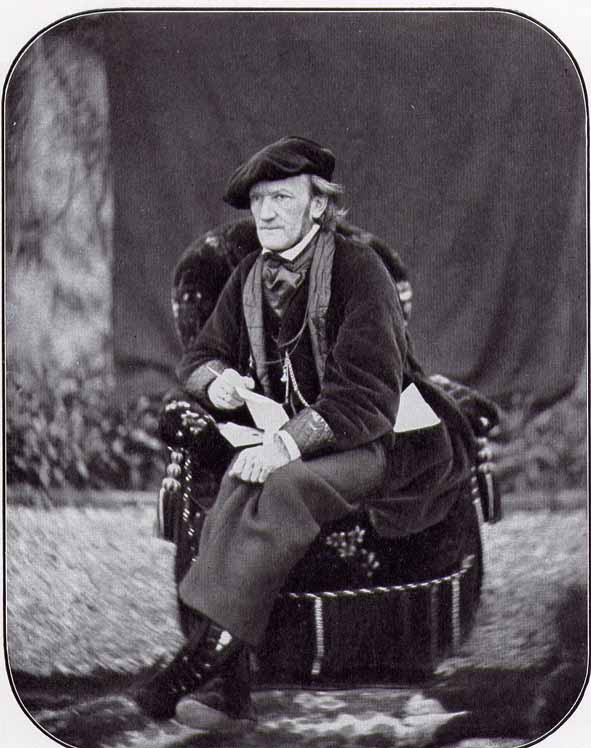
Wagner in 1868

The Siegfried Idyll, WWV 103, by Richard Wagner is a symphonic poem for chamber orchestra.

== Background ==
Wagner composed the Siegfried Idyll as a birthday present to his second wife, Cosima, after the birth of their son Siegfried in 1869. It was first performed on Christmas morning, 25 December 1870, by a small ensemble of the Tonhalle-Orchester Zürich on the stairs of their villa at Tribschen (today part of Lucerne), Switzerland. Cosima awoke to its opening melody. Conductor Hans Richter learned the trumpet in order to play the brief trumpet part, which lasts only 13 measures, in that private performance, reportedly having sailed out to the centre of Lake Lucerne to practise, so as not to be heard.

The original title was Triebschen Idyll with Fidi's birdsong and the orange sunrise, as symphonic birthday greeting. Presented to his Cosima by her Richard. "Fidi" was the family's nickname for their son Siegfried. It is thought that the birdsong and the sunrise refer to incidents of personal significance to the couple.

Wagner's opera Siegfried, which was premiered in 1876, incorporates music from the Idyll. Wagner adapted the material from an unfinished chamber piece into the Idyll before giving the theme to Brünnhilde in the opera's final scene, the "Ewig war ich" love duet between Brünnhilde and Siegfried. This theme, Wagner claimed, came to him during the summer of 1864 at the Villa Pellet, overlooking Lake Starnberg, where he and Cosima consummated their union. He is contradicted, however, by his own obsessive record keeping: the melody was composed that 14 November, when he was alone in Munich. The work also uses a theme based on the German lullaby, "Schlaf, Kindlein, schlaf", which was jotted down by Wagner on New Year's Eve 1868 and introduced by a solo oboe. Ernest Newman discovered it was linked to the Wagners' older daughter Eva. This and other musical references, whose meaning remained unknown to the outside world for many years, reveal the idyll's levels of personal significance for both Wagner and Cosima.

Wagner originally intended the Siegfried Idyll to remain a private piece. However, due to financial pressures, he decided to sell the score to publisher B. Schott in 1878. In doing so, Wagner expanded the orchestration to 35 players to make the piece more marketable. The original piece is scored for a small chamber orchestra of 13 players: flute, oboe, two clarinets, bassoon, two horns, trumpet, two violins, viola, cello and double bass. The piece is commonly played today by orchestras with more than one player on each string part. Modern performances are much slower than those of earlier years.
