= Franz Xaver Amrhyn =

Swiss Jesuit priest (1655–1731)

- Born: 22 August 1655; Lucerne, Swiss Confederacy
- Died: 6 November 1731 (aged 76); Munich
- Occupations: Jesuit priest, theologian, academic

Franz Xaver Amrhyn (22 August 1655, Lucerne – 6 November 1731, Munich) was a Swiss Catholic Jesuit priest and theologian. Son of Joseph Amrhyn and brother of Karl Anton Amrhyn, he was considered one of the most eminent Swiss Jesuits before the suppression of the order in 1773.

== Life and career ==
Amrhyn entered the Society of Jesus at Landsberg am Lech in 1671 and was ordained priest in Rome in 1684. He taught philosophy (a three-year course) at the University of Ingolstadt (1686–1692), and subsequently requested, without success, to be sent to the missions by the superior general of the order.

He then served as professor of theology and prefect of studies in Lucerne (1692–1698), professor of moral theology at Ingolstadt (1698–1701), and court preacher at St. Michael's in Munich (1701–1714). He was rector of the Jesuit colleges of Munich (1712–1715) and Regensburg (1715–1718), and provincial of the order (1718–1721). He subsequently served as rector at Ingolstadt (1721–1724), Regensburg (1724–1728), and Amberg in Bavaria (1728–1731).

== Bibliography ==
- HS, VII, 105
- F. Strobel, Schweizer Jesuitenlexikon, ms., 1986, p. 29
