= Walther Amrhyn =

Lucerne merchant and military entrepreneur

- Born: before 1570; Lucerne
- Died: 31 March 1635; Lucerne
- Spouse(s): Jakobea Pfyffer von Altishofen (m. 1587); Elisabeth Bodmer (m. 1624)

Walther Amrhyn (before 1570 – 31 March 1635) was a Swiss merchant, mercenary and politician from Lucerne active in the late 16th and early 17th centuries.

He was the son of Joseph Amrhyn, a member of the Small Council (1586). Through his commercial and military activities, he significantly increased the family's fortune, which amounted to 52,000 florins at his death in 1635.

== Life ==
Walther Amrhyn was married twice: first in 1587 to Jakobea Pfyffer von Altishofen, and second in 1624 to Elisabeth Bodmer of Baden, widow of the avoyer Jost Pfyffer. He was ennobled by the Duke of Savoy in 1599 and became a knight of the Order of Saints Maurice and Lazarus in 1616.

Amrhyn was a merchant dealing in wine and salt, as well as a military entrepreneur. He served as a lieutenant-colonel in the Swiss regiment in the service of Savoy in 1598, as colonel during a troop levy in the service of Milan in 1607, and as captain of the guard of the Duke of Savoy in Turin in 1609.

In Lucerne's political life, he was a member of the Small Council from 1587, avoyer in 1624, 1626, 1628, and 1631, bailiff (Vogt) of the Michelsamt (1591–1593) and of the Freie Ämter (1607–1609), and city banneret in 1610. He served as a delegate to the Federal Diet and to negotiations for alliances with Spain and Savoy, initially supporting these powers before subsequently aligning with France.

In 1617, he commissioned the construction of the Amrhyn mansion (Amrhyn-Haus), a Baroque-style private residence adjacent to the Lucerne town hall.

== Bibliography ==
- K. Messmer, P. Hoppe, Luzerner Patriziat, 1976
- R. Bolzern, Spanien, Mailand und die katholische Eidgenossenschaft, 1982
