= Jakob Balde =

German poet (1604–1668)

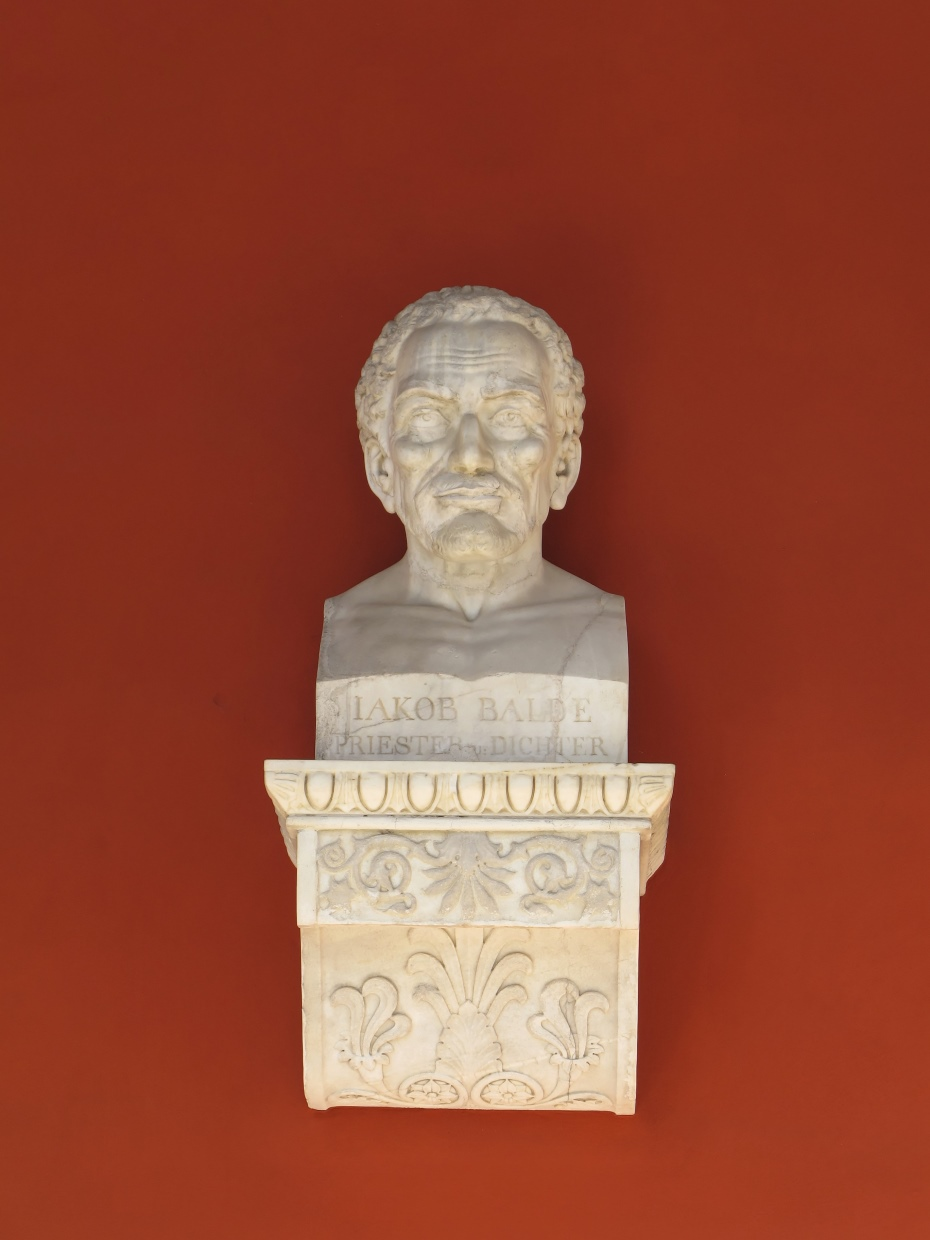
- Bust of Jakob Balde
- Born: January 4, 1604; Ensisheim, Alsace
- Died: August 9, 1668 (aged 64)
- Writing career
- Language: Neo-Latin
- Genre: poetry

Jakob Balde (January 4, 1604 – August 9, 1668) was a German poet who wrote primarily in Neo-Latin rather than in his native German language, was born at Ensisheim in Alsace.

== Biography ==
Driven from Alsace by the marauding bands of Count Mansfeld, he fled to Ingolstadt where he began to study law. A love disappointment, however, turned his thoughts to the church, and in 1624 he entered the Society of Jesus. Continuing his study of the humanities, he became in 1628 professor of rhetoric at Innsbruck, and in 1635 at Ingolstadt, whither he had been transferred by his superiors in order to study theology. In 1633 he was ordained a priest.

His lectures and poems had now made him famous, and he was summoned to Munich where, in 1638, he became court chaplain to the elector Maximilian I. He remained in Munich till 1650, when he went to live at Landshut and afterwards at Amberg. In 1654 he was transferred to Neuburg on the Danube, as court preacher and confessor to the count palatine. He remained at Neuburg for the rest of his life.

A collected edition of Balde's works in 4 vols was published at Cologne in 1660; a more complete edition in 8 vols at Munich, 1729; also a good selection by L. Spach (Paris and Strasbourg, 1871). An edition of his Latin lyrics was edited by Benno Müller in 1844 in Munich and another edition also appeared at Regensburg in 1884. There are translations into German of some of his odes by Johann Gottfried Herder (1795), his satires by Johannes Neubig (Munich, 1833) and J. Schrott and M. Schleich (Munich, 1870). See G. Westermayer, Jacobus Balde, sein Leben und seine Werke (1868); J. Bach, Jakob Balde (Freiburg, 1904). Various odes have been translated into English by Karl Maurer.

== Works ==
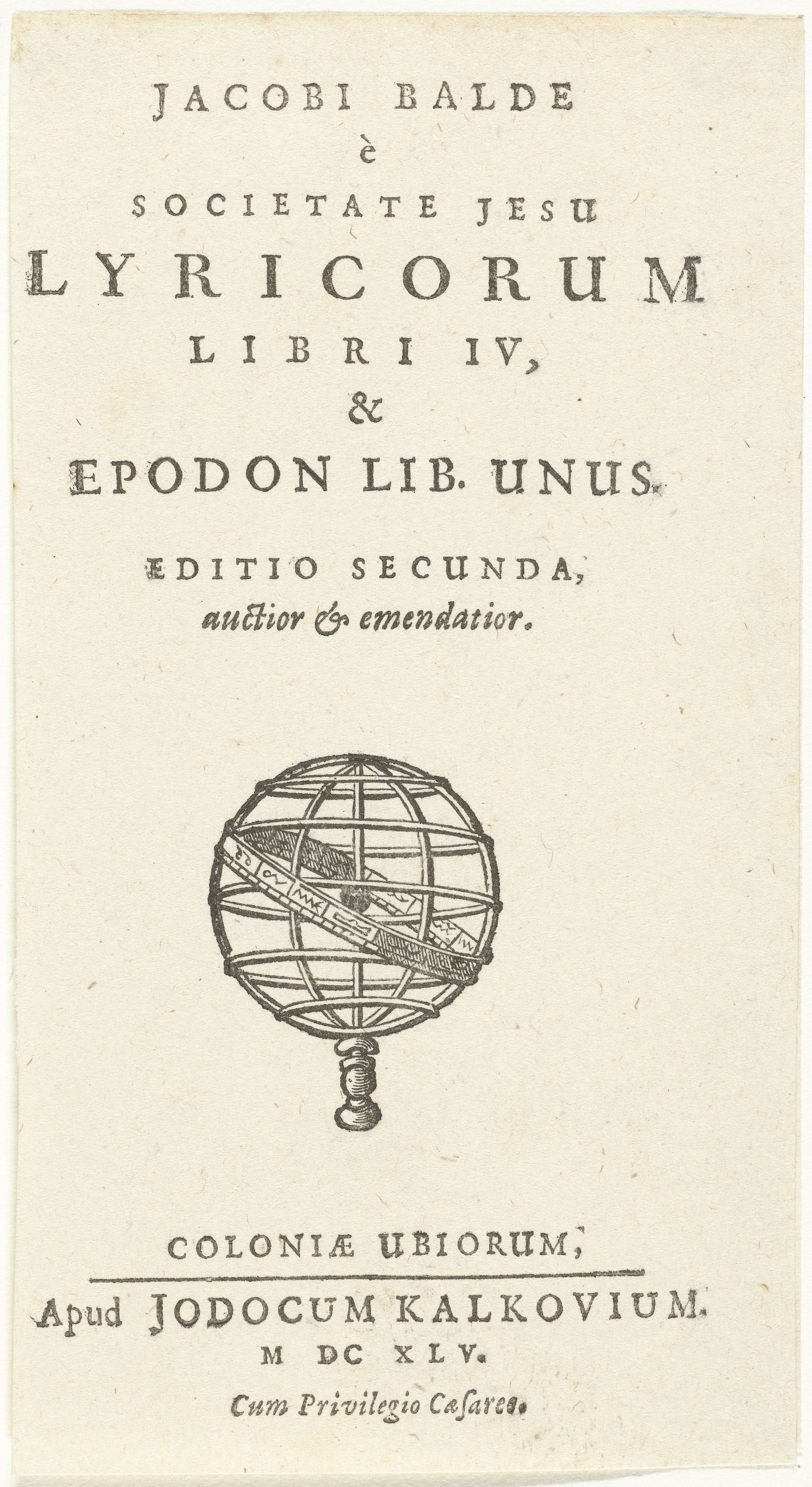
Jacob Balde, Lyricorum libri IV, Lowijs Elzevier (III), Jost Kalckhoven, Cologne, 1645.

- Balde, Jakob (1635). Epithalamion (in Latin). Monachii – via Formis Cornelii Leysserii Electoralis Typographi et Bibliopolae.
- Balde, Jakob (1636). De vanitate mundi (in Latin). Monachii – via Formis Cornelii Leysserii Electoralis Typographi et Bibliopolae.
- Balde, Jakob (1637). Batrachomyomachia Homeri, tuba Romana cantata, et aevo nostro accommodata (in Latin). Ingolstadt – via Gregor Hänlin.
- Balde, Jakob (1638). Agathyrsus (in Latin). Monachii – via typis Corn. Leyserii.
- Balde, Jakob (1643). Iacobi Balde è Societate Iesv Lyricorvm Lib. IV.: Epodon Lib. Vnus (in Latin). Monachii – via typis Corn. Leyserii.
- Balde, Jakob (1643). Iacobi Balde è Societate Jesv Sylvarum Libri VII (in Latin). Monachii – via typis Corn. Leyserii.
- Balde, Jakob (1647). Agathyrsus teutsch (in German). München – via bey Lucas Straub.
- Balde, Jakob (1651). Medicinae Gloria Per Satyras XXII. Asserta (in Latin). Monachii – via Wagner.
- Balde, Jakob (1654). Iephtias: Tragoedia (in Latin). Ambergae – via Haugenhofer.
- Balde, Jakob (1657). Satyra contra abusum Tabaci ad Aemilianum Aloysium Guevarram (in Latin). Monachii – via Wagnerus.
- Balde, Jakob (1658). Vultuosæ torvitatis encomium. In gratiam philosophorum, ac poetarum explicatum (in Latin). Monachii – via Sumptibus I. Wagneri.
- Balde, Jakob (1663). Urania victrix (in Latin). Monachii – via Typis J.W. Scheli.
