= Ludwig Pfyffer =

Swiss military and political leader

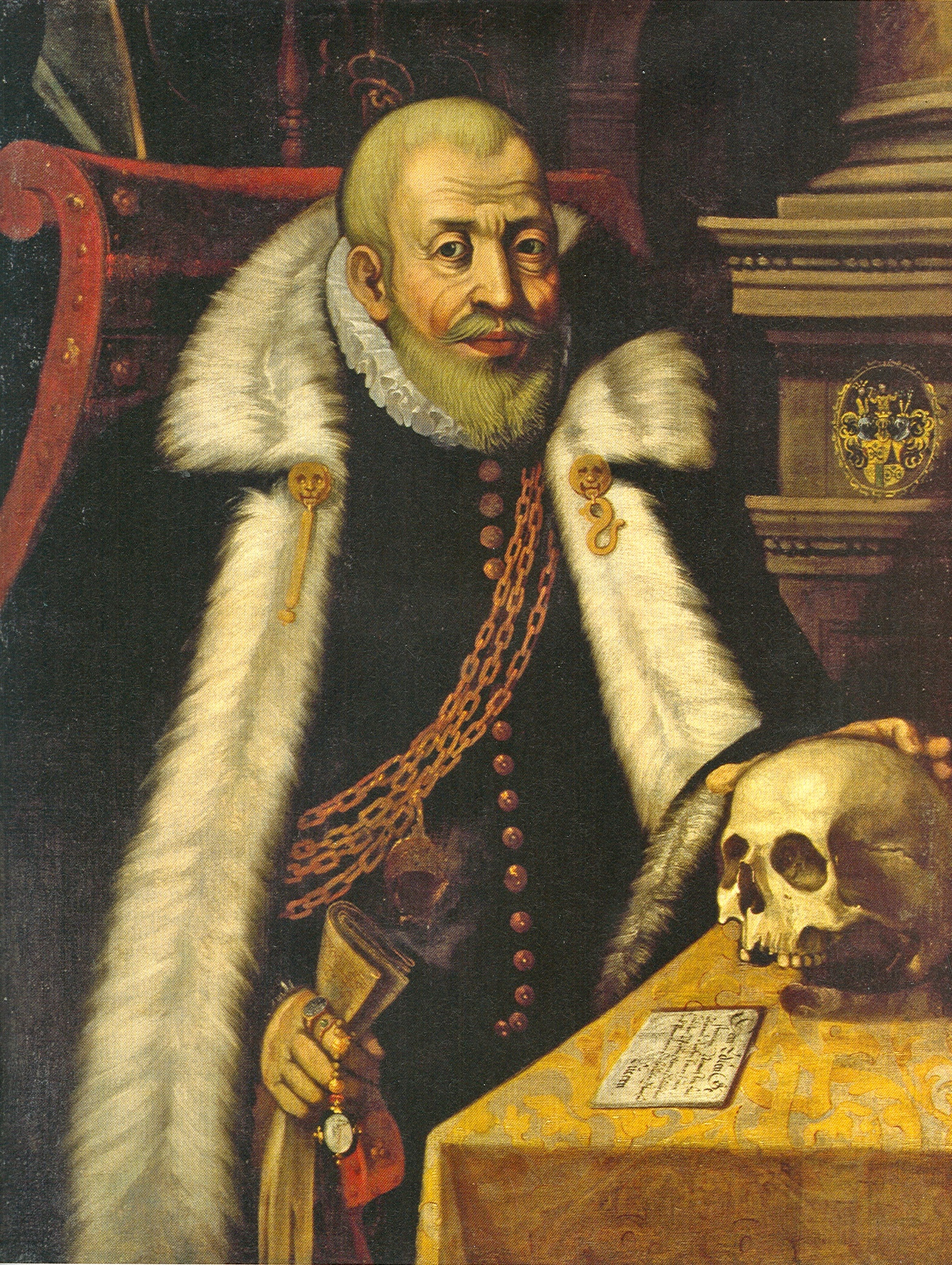
Portrait of Ludwig Pfyffer in Heidegg Castle

Ludwig Pfyffer von Altishofen (Lucerne, 1524 – Lucerne, 17 March 1594) was a Swiss military and political leader, spokesman for Roman Catholic interests in the cantons, chief magistrate of Lucerne, and probably the most important Swiss political figure in the latter half of the 16th century.

== Early career ==
Pfyffer was born into a patrician family in Lucerne, the son of Leodegar Pfyffer, the treasurer of Lucerne, and Elizabeth Kiel. He became a mercenary in the service of France in 1553, and by 1563 he was colonel of a regiment engaged against the Huguenots in the French Wars of Religion. Pfyffer won fame by safely escorting King Charles IX's family from Meaux to Paris in 1567, during the surprise of Meaux, and further distinguished himself at the Battle of Moncontour in 1569.

== Political career ==
After returning to Switzerland in 1569, Pfyffer was elected chief magistrate (schultheiss) of Lucerne in 1571, serving eleven consecutive terms until his death. He made the city the centre of Catholic Counter-Reformation activity in Switzerland. As a leading figure of the Catholic cantons, Pfyffer influenced all of the Confederation's policy in matters of recruitment, alliances, and military capitulations (with Savoy in 1577 and Spain in 1587), which earned him the nickname “King of the Swiss”.

His Golden League (also called the Borromean League after Cardinal Carlo Borromeo) nearly led to the destruction of the Swiss Confederation. The alliance of the seven Catholic cantons pledged itself to use armed force to expel heretics. Its elevation of religious interests severely strained the civil union. The canton of Appenzell divided along religious lines. Pfyffer established close relations with the Catholic League of Philip II of Spain and Henry I, Duke of Guise, and personally led troops against his former ally Henry III of France in 1585. He concluded a Swiss alliance with Spain in 1587 against the accession of Henry of Navarre (Henry IV) to the French throne.

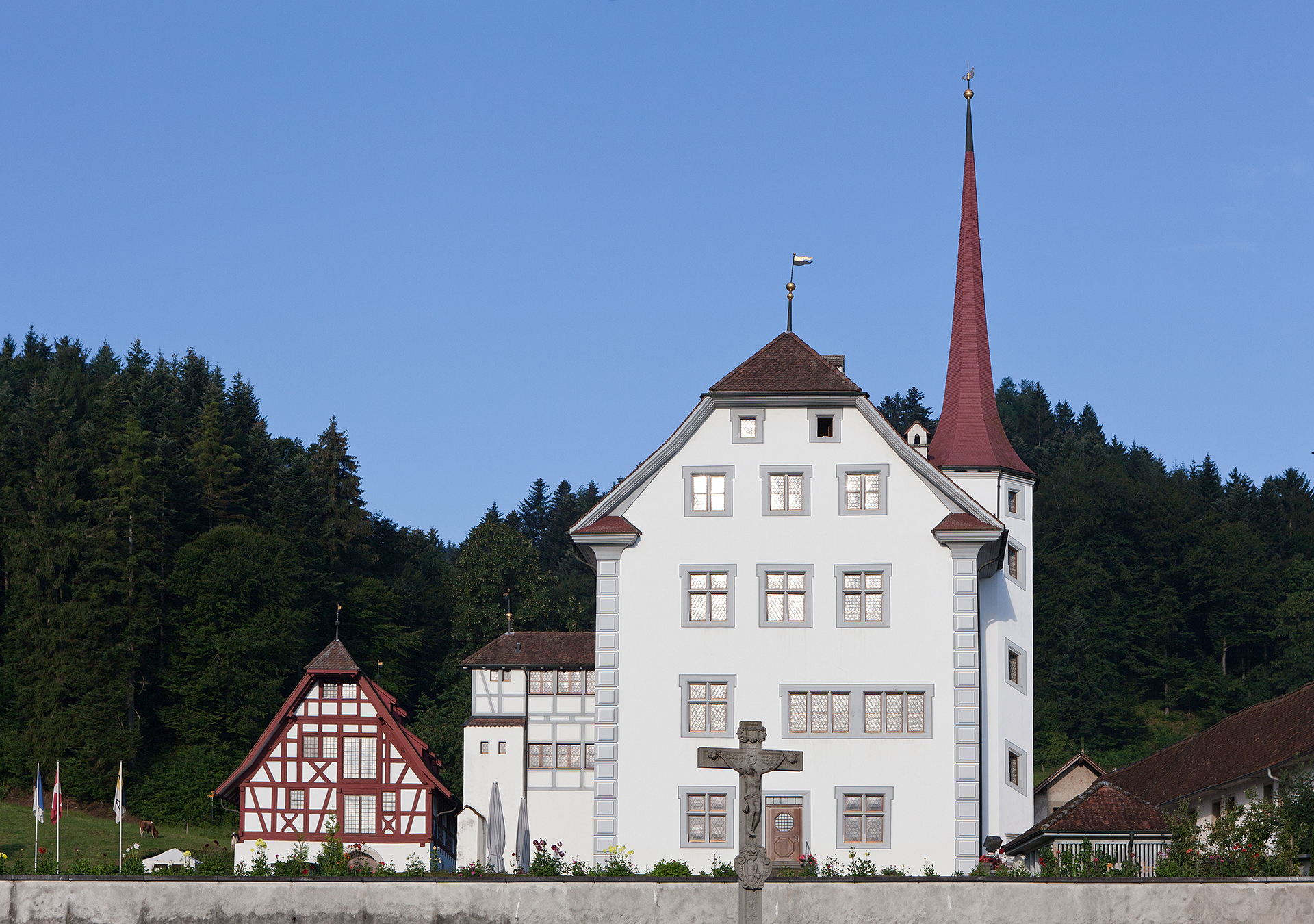
Altishofen Castle

Before his military and political career, Pfyffer was a cloth and cattle merchant, financier, and partner of a company active in the salt trade. He acquired a substantial fortune from pensions received from France, Savoy, Spain and the pope. As the Swiss delegate to the Diet of Augsburg in 1566, he received a patent of nobility from Maximilian II, Holy Roman Emperor. In 1571, Pfyffer acquired the lordship of Altishofen from the Teutonic Knights, where he built a castle which can still be seen today. He bought Wyher Castle near Ettiswil in 1588. Pfyffer was one of the richest men in Switzerland at the time of his death on 17 March 1594, in Lucerne.

== See also ==
- Pfyffer
