= Lordship of Rothenburg =

Former lordship in Lucerne, Switzerland

Lordship of Rothenburg Herrschaft Rothenburg
- Lordship of the Holy Roman Empire
- until 1798
- Capital: Rothenburg

The Lordship of Rothenburg (German: Herrschaft Rothenburg) was a lordship and later an office (Amt) or bailiwick (Landvogtei) in what is now the canton of Lucerne, Switzerland. Its core was the lordship of the barons (Freiherren) of Rotenburg, which in the 13th century consisted of scattered rights and estates between Inwil and Rüeggeringen near Hellbühl. After 1297 the Habsburgs acquired the lordship and around 1300 set up an Austrian office there, which was administered from Rothenburg from about 1309. Lucerne conquered Rothenburg in 1385 and acquired the office as a pledge in 1395; the bailiwick of Rothenburg was divided in 1798 into the districts of Sempach and Hochdorf.

== History ==
The office of Rothenburg arose from various judicial structures whose composition changed several times. Its core, the lordship of the barons of Rotenburg, consisted in the 13th century of scattered rights and estates in an area that reached from Inwil to Rüeggeringen near Hellbühl, with exclaves in Werthenstein, Schwanden and Sigigen. The estates of the barons of Rotenburg were partly intermixed with those of the barons of Eschenbach, who were probably related to them. The lordship included the church patronage (Kirchensatz) of Rüeggeringen, the parish church of Rothenburg. Its center was Rothenburg Castle with a small settlement in front of it (Vorburgsiedlung), which was presumably already an administrative center under the barons of Rotenburg and probably received town rights from the Habsburgs at the beginning of the 14th century. The castle of Rothenburg near Hellbühl was possibly even older. The barons held the advocacy (Kastvogtei) over the monastery of Lucerne and its estates on this side of the Lopper, and from about 1135 they were sub-advocates (Untervögte) under the Habsburg advocates of Murbach Abbey.

After 1297 the Habsburgs acquired the lordship, and around 1300 they set up the Austrian office, which also included the Murbach manors (Höfe) and advocacies near Lucerne acquired in 1291: Horw, Kriens, Malters, Littau, Emmen, Buchrain, Adligenswil, the Eigental and other manors such as Hergiswil and Lamperdingen. Individual farms on the Dietschiberg still belonged to Rothenburg in the 15th century. Most of the Murbach manors were detached from the office again in the 14th century as fiefs and pledged lordships. After 1308 the confiscated property of the barons of Eschenbach was added. The complex was first administered from Baden, until the Habsburg bailiwick administration was set up in Rothenburg around 1309. It was in charge of the toll at Rothenburg (probably established around 1330/1340 and moved to Emmenbrücke in 1588), the bridge or ferry near Emmen, the lake bailiwick (Seevogtei) of Sempach and the fishing rights (Fischenz) in the Reuss.

The bailiffs (Vögte) exercised an intensive, mediatizing and at times high-handed rule, especially from 1368, when the bailiwick was pledged to the barons of Grünenberg. Before them, Count Johann of Frohburg had been the first holder of the pledge, until 1366. The Grünenbergs increased their revenues and their sphere of power by incorporating manors and through their toll policy. There were repeated conflicts with the town of Lucerne and the inner cantons (Innere Orte). In 1385 Rothenburg was conquered, and Lucerne, which acquired the office as a pledge in 1395, enlarged it with parts of other conquered offices, among them Geuensee from 1416 and Hochdorf from 1418.

With the office, which was now often called a county (Grafschaft), Lucerne took over most of the low courts, and as successor to the Austrian bailiffs and the advocates of Murbach it also claimed the high court in Kriens, Horw and Adligenswil. A customary law of the office (Amtsrecht) already existed before 1436; around 1490 it was codified anew on the model of Lucerne's town law. The bailiff (Landvogt) no longer resided locally. In the Rothenburg uprising of 1570 the office resisted new burdens and restrictions imposed by the authorities, above all bans on the export of cattle. A permanent treasurer of the office (Amtsseckelmeister) is mentioned from 1675. For tax and military purposes the office was divided into the Inner Office (Inneres Amt) of Rothenburg and the Outer Office (Äusseres Amt) of Hochdorf, each of which provided a court usher (Weibel).

In 1798 the office was divided into the districts of Sempach and Hochdorf. In 1803 most of it was combined into the newly created district (Amt) of Hochdorf. Emmen, Buchrain and Dierikon went to the district of Lucerne-Land, the exclaves of Werthenstein and Schwanden to the district of Entlebuch, and Sigigen to the district of Sursee.

== Bibliography ==
- F. Zelger, Studien und Forschungen zur Geschichte der Freiherren von Rotenburg-Wolhusen sowie des Amtes und Fleckens Rotenburg, 1931
- F. Glauser, J. J. Siegrist, Die Luzerner Pfarreien und Landvogteien, 1977
- F. Glauser, "Luzern und die Herrschaft Österreich, 1326–1336", in Luzern und die Eidgenossenschaft, 1982, pp. 9–135
- F. Glauser, "Luzern und das Luzernbiet im Spätmittelalter", in Alltag zur Sempacherzeit, exhibition catalogue, Lucerne, 1986, pp. 19–40
- B. Vögeli, "Der Rothenburger Aufstand von 1570", in Jahrbuch der Historischen Gesellschaft Luzern 10, 1992, pp. 2–40
