= Small Council =

Executive council in Swiss cities of the Old Confederation

The Small Council (German: Kleiner Rat; French: Petit Conseil; Italian: Piccolo Consiglio) was the executive governing body in the cities of the Old Swiss Confederation, both sovereign and subject cities, as well as in the Republic of Geneva. As a collegial governing organ, the Small Council ensured the continuity of municipal institutions and embodied their capacity to act as the primary decision-making authority.

Today, the terminology used to designate similar cantonal executive governing bodies is Regierungsrat (Executive Council) in German-speaking cantons, Conseil d'État (State Council) in French-speaking cantons, and Consiglio di Stato (Council of State) in Italian-speaking Switzerland.

== Origins and composition ==
The Small Council originated in the 14th century from a small group formed by some of the "richest, most distinguished and most powerful" inhabitants. The council was presided over by a burgomaster or avoyer, and in Geneva by a syndic. It consisted of supreme magistrates assisted by ten to fifty councillors, depending on the city.

The selection of councillors varied by location and period. They were elected by bourgeois, guilds, districts, or electoral colleges, or alternatively designated through cooptation once or twice per year. Councillors exercised their mandate for life and served without compensation, which meant that eligibility required having sufficient leisure time, effectively limiting participation to the wealthy classes.

== Powers and functions ==
The Small Council held extensive authority over all matters of domestic and foreign policy. It served as the supreme administrative authority and possessed the principal judicial competencies within its jurisdiction. The council had the power to convene the Grand Conseil at intervals of its own choosing, presided over joint sessions, and maintained control over the debates.

Certain tasks were delegated to a secret council or to specialized commissions known as chambers. This concentration of powers allowed the Small Council to maintain effective governance while managing the complex administrative needs of urban centers in the Old Swiss Confederation.

== Social evolution and oligarchization ==
Until the 16th century, renewal of council membership remained relatively rapid. However, the renewal process became increasingly restricted thereafter, leading to significant oligarchization that drastically limited the number of families represented. For example, in Lucerne, forty-five families were represented between 1501 and 1510, but only twenty families remained after 1680.

From the 15th century onward, the Small Council considered itself the holder of divine right over political authority concerning both the city's bourgeois and its subjects. This concentration of power led to conflicts with the Grand Conseil, guilds, or bourgeois in various cities: Bern in 1681-1687, Schaffhausen in 1689, Basel in 1691, Zurich in 1713, Solothurn in 1723, and Geneva throughout the 18th century.

== End of the Old Regime and transformation ==
The revolution of 1798 eliminated the Small Councils of the Ancien Régime. However, the Helvetic government resulting from the third coup d'état of October 27-28, 1801, adopted the name "Small Council".

In 1803, the institution reappeared in the cantons as cantonal governments. Until 1848, its members generally also sat in the legislative branch. During the constitutional revisions of the 19th century, the term Small Council was replaced by Conseil d'État, Consiglio di Stato, or Regierungsrat (State Council), depending on the linguistic region.

The timeline of these changes varied by canton: Vaud and Ticino in 1814, Zurich in 1831, Lucerne in 1841, Schwyz in 1848, Aargau in 1852, and Basel-Stadt in 1875. However, the term persisted in Grisons until 1971, making it the last canton to adopt the modern terminology.

== Bibliography ==
- Peyer, Verfassung, 48-55, 107-116
- HbSG, 1, 253-254, 267-268, 548-557; 2, 687-692, 708-711, 750-757
- Nouvelle hist. de la Suisse et des Suisses, 1, 1982, 146-147; 2, 1983, 119-122, 131-136
- Braun, Ancien Régime, 171-251
- E. Isenmann, "Die städtische Gemeinde im oberdeutsch-schweizerischen Raum (1300-1800)", in Landgemeinde und Stadtgemeinde in Mitteleuropa, éd. P. Blickle, 1991, 191-261
- S. Schüpbach-Guggenbühl, Schlüssel zur Macht, 2002
