= Avoyer =

Medieval official in Switzerland responsible for administering justice

An avoyer (German: Schultheiss; Italian: scoltetto; Latin: scultetus) was a medieval official in Switzerland representing a lord and tasked, in their name, with administering high justice or low justice. The office derives from a Frankish-era judicial functionary and corresponds to the Swiss urban development of the office known in Germany as Schultheiß.

Probably initially linked to landed lordship, the avoyer subsequently became the representative of the lord, both in cities and in the countryside, in judicial and administrative matters. The position largely overlapped with that of the Ammann, Meier, Landvogt, or Reichsvogt.

== Geographic distribution ==
While avoyers were found in villages beyond the Rhine, in the territory of present-day Switzerland they were encountered primarily in cities. In the Habsburg city of Lucerne, the avoyer replaced the Ammann (a hereditary office) in 1304. In Bern, the avoyer legally represented the emperor, but in practice represented the bourgeoisie from the second half of the 13th century. He presided over the Council and, later, the city tribunal. However, he was only elected by the bourgeois or their Council after the transfer of sovereignty rights from the lord to the city (in 1293 in Bern by imperial privilege; in 1415 in Lucerne and in 1477-1478 in Fribourg, through acts of war).

== Role in cantonal capitals ==
In Bern, Lucerne, Fribourg, and Solothurn, the avoyer became head of the city and the state, with a role analogous to that of the Bürgermeister of Basel and the cities of northeastern Switzerland. The Grand Council elected the avoyer along with other magistrates. Two avoyers, one in office and one in reserve, alternated each year or every two years, often until their death. In municipal towns, the avoyer became the first magistrate of the city and the representative of cantonal authorities from the 15th century onwards, notably in Frauenfeld, Winterthur, and Bremgarten (AG), while also exercising the function of Landvogt in places such as Burgdorf and Thun.

== Abolition ==
The position of avoyer disappeared in municipal towns in 1798, and later in cantonal capitals (in Solothurn in 1831, in Bern in 1846, and in Fribourg in 1848). In Lucerne, the president of the Government Council of the Canton of Lucerne, who changes annually, bore the title of avoyer until 2007.

== Bibliography ==
- Peyer, Verfassung, pp. 48-55
- J.J. Siegrist, "Zur Entstehung und frühen Entwicklung der Stadt Luzern", in Luzern 1178-1978, 1978, pp. 118-120
- A. Bickel, Willisau, 1, 1982, pp. 254-266
- HRG, 4, pp. 1519-1521
- LexMA, 7, pp. 1591-1592
