= Cantonal Council of Lucerne =

Legislature of the Canton of Lucerne, Switzerland

Cantonal Council of Lucerne Luzerner Kantonsrat (German)

Leadership
- President: Gisela Widmer Reichlin, SP

Structure
- Seats: 120
- Political groups: Parties in the Cantonal Council (120): SVP (27); FDP (22); SP (19); GPS (12); GLP (8)
- Length of term: Four years

Elections
- Last election: 10 May 2023
- Next election: 2027

The Cantonal Council of Lucerne (German: Luzerner Kantonsrat) respectively until 2007 Grand Council of Lucerne (German: Luzerner Grossrat) is the legislature of the Canton of Lucerne in Switzerland. The Cantonal Council has 120 seats, divided into six electoral districts, with members elected every four years.
