= List of cultural property of national significance in Switzerland: Lucerne =

This list contains all cultural property of national significance (class A) in the canton of Lucerne from the 2009 Swiss Inventory of Cultural Property of National and Regional Significance. It is sorted by municipality and contains 83 individual buildings, 27 collections, 17 archaeological finds and 6 other, special sites.

The geographic coordinates provided are in the Swiss coordinate system as given in the Inventory.

== Adligenswil ==
KGS No.^{?}	Picture	Name	Street Address	CH1903 X coordinate	CH1903 Y coordinate	Location
Unknown		ISOS Weiler: Dottenberg				

== Alberswil ==
KGS No.^{?}	Picture	Name	Street Address	CH1903 X coordinate	CH1903 Y coordinate	Location
3629	Kastelen Tower	Kastelen Tower		642.047	221.923	47.146944°N 7.992994°E
8587	Schweizerisches Museum für Landwirtschaft und Agrartechnik	Schweizerisches Museum für Landwirtschaft und Agrartechnik	Burgrain 8	642.571	221.511	47.143204°N 7.999864°E
Unknown		ISOS Spezialfall: Landscapes Kastelen				

== Altishofen ==
KGS No.^{?}	Picture	Name	Street Address	CH1903 X coordinate	CH1903 Y coordinate	Location
Unknown		ISOS Dorf: Altishofen				

== Beromünster ==
KGS No.^{?}	Picture	Name	Street Address	CH1903 X coordinate	CH1903 Y coordinate	Location
3636	Canon and Prebendary House, North Group	Canon and Prebendary House, North Group	Stift 7 – 11	656.877	228.591	47.20581°N 8.189347°E
10094	Canon and Prebendary House, South Group	Canon and Prebendary House, South Group	Stift 33 – 38	656.943	228.527	47.205228°N 8.19021°E
3638	Former Administration Building (Gasthof Hirschen)	Former Administration Building (Gasthof Hirschen)	Hirschenplatz 1	657.005	228.592	47.205808°N 8.191036°E
10095	Kustorei	Kustorei	Stift 3	656.839	228.566	47.205588°N 8.188842°E
10093	Landessender Beromünster	Landessender Beromünster	Walterswil, Blosenberg	655.525	227.964	47.200285°N 8.171426°E
3642	Provost's House	Provost's House	Stift 1	656.852	228.535	47.205308°N 8.18901°E
8908, 8621, 9304/extendedHtmlPopup 3637, 8908, 8621, 9304	Collegiate church with Archive, Library and Church Treasures	Collegiate church with Archive, Library and Church Treasures		656.939	228.604	47.205921°N 8.190167°E
Unknown		ISOS Kleinstadt / Flecken: Beromünster				

== Buchrain ==
KGS No.^{?}	Picture	Name	Street Address	CH1903 X coordinate	CH1903 Y coordinate	Location
Unknown		ISOS Spezialfall: Perlen (shared with Root)				

== Buttisholz ==
KGS No.^{?}	Picture	Name	Street Address	CH1903 X coordinate	CH1903 Y coordinate	Location
3649	Buttisholz Castle and Surrounding Lands	Buttisholz Castle and Surrounding Lands		649.966	218.444	47.115101°N 8.097011°E
Unknown		ISOS Dorf: Buttisholz				

== Dierikon ==
KGS No.^{?}	Picture	Name	Street Address	CH1903 X coordinate	CH1903 Y coordinate	Location
3653	Götzental Castle with Chapel	Götzental Castle with Chapel		671.245	216.069	47.091792°N 8.376996°E
Unknown		ISOS Weiler: Dierikon				

== Egolzwil ==
KGS No.^{?}	Picture	Name	Street Address	CH1903 X coordinate	CH1903 Y coordinate	Location
3657		Wauwilermoos (Egolzwil, Wauwil, Schötz, Ettiswil, Mauensee), Paleolithic-Neolithic Lake Shore Settlement		644.530	225.500	47.178955°N 8.026082°E

== Emmen ==
KGS No.^{?}	Picture	Name	Street Address	CH1903 X coordinate	CH1903 Y coordinate	Location
10097	Flugzeugmontagehalle Ruag	Flugzeugmontagehalle Ruag	Hochdorfstrasse	666.151	215.801	47.08991°N 8.30987°E
10098		Rothenburger Bridge	Rothenburgstrasse / Bertiswilstrasse	663.460	216.150	47.093312°N 8.27448°E
8805	Von Moos Stahl AG, Historic Archive	Von Moos Stahl AG, Historic Archive	Emmenweidstrasse 90	662.965	213.573	47.070181°N 8.267602°E

== Ermensee ==
KGS No.^{?}	Picture	Name	Street Address	CH1903 X coordinate	CH1903 Y coordinate	Location
Unknown		ISOS Dorf: Ermensee				

== Escholzmatt ==
KGS No.^{?}	Picture	Name	Street Address	CH1903 X coordinate	CH1903 Y coordinate	Location
Unknown		ISOS Dorf: Escholzmatt				

== Ettiswil ==
KGS No.^{?}	Picture	Name	Street Address	CH1903 X coordinate	CH1903 Y coordinate	Location
Unknown		Wauwilermoos (Egolzwil, Wauwil, Schötz, Ettiswil, Mauensee), Paleolithic-Neolithic Lake Shore Settlement		644.530	225.500	47.178955°N 8.026082°E
Unknown		ISOS Weiler: Seewagen				

== Gettnau ==
KGS No.^{?}	Picture	Name	Street Address	CH1903 X coordinate	CH1903 Y coordinate	Location
10480		Stadtägertli	Burgstelle	639.830	220.500	47.134281°N 7.96364°E
Unknown		ISOS Spezialfall: Landscapes Kastelen				

== Geuensee ==
KGS No.^{?}	Picture	Name	Street Address	CH1903 X coordinate	CH1903 Y coordinate	Location
Unknown		ISOS Weiler: Krummbach				

== Greppen ==
KGS No.^{?}	Picture	Name	Street Address	CH1903 X coordinate	CH1903 Y coordinate	Location
Unknown		ISOS Dorf: Greppen				

== Hasle ==
KGS No.^{?}	Picture	Name	Street Address	CH1903 X coordinate	CH1903 Y coordinate	Location
3683	Wallfahrtskirche Heiligkreuz	Wallfahrtskirche Heiligkreuz	Heiligkreuz 201	646.425	200.009	46.94954°N 8.048468°E
Unknown		ISOS Spezialfall: Wallfahrtsort Heiligkreuz				

== Hitzkirch ==
KGS No.^{?}	Picture	Name	Street Address	CH1903 X coordinate	CH1903 Y coordinate	Location
3691	Former Teutonic Knights Commandry	Former Teutonic Knights Commandry	Kommendeweg 3	662.594	230.793	47.225098°N 8.265105°E
3690	Richensee Megalithic Tower	Richensee; Megalithic Tower	Megalithturm	661.599	230.227	47.220101°N 8.251891°E
3671	Heidegg Castle with House and Chapel	Heidegg Castle with House and Chapel	Heidegg	663.165	229.871	47.216751°N 8.272515°E
3689		Seematt, Neolithic Lake Shore Settlement		661.300	229.750	47.215839°N 8.247879°E
Unknown		ISOS Dorf: Hitzkirch				
Unknown		ISOS Spezialfall: Richensee				
Unknown		ISOS Spezialfall: Castle Heidegg				

== Hochdorf ==
KGS No.^{?}	Picture	Name	Street Address	CH1903 X coordinate	CH1903 Y coordinate	Location
9587		Baldegg, Neolithic / Bronze Age; Lake Shore Settlement		663.300	226.000	47.181922°N 8.273753°E

== Hohenrain ==
KGS No.^{?}	Picture	Name	Street Address	CH1903 X coordinate	CH1903 Y coordinate	Location
3715	Ruins of Nünegg Castle	Ruins of Nünegg Castle		665.549	229.023	47.208892°N 8.303861°E
3695	Former Knights Hospitaller Commandry	Former Knights Hospitaller Commandry	Dorf	666.693	225.761	47.179439°N 8.318478°E
3696		Ottenhusen	römischer Gutshof	667.900	224.300	47.166176°N 8.33418°E
Unknown		ISOS Spezialfall: Hohenrain				

== Horw ==
KGS No.^{?}	Picture	Name	Street Address	CH1903 X coordinate	CH1903 Y coordinate	Location
3702	Farm House Oberdorni	Farm House Oberdorni	Oberdorni 903	668.013	206.787	47.008645°N 8.333038°E

== Inwil ==
KGS No.^{?}	Picture	Name	Street Address	CH1903 X coordinate	CH1903 Y coordinate	Location
9588	Alt-Eschenbach, Medieval City Ruins, Ruined Castle	Alt-Eschenbach, Medieval City Ruins, Ruined Castle		669.500	218.750	47.116091°N 8.354427°E

== Kriens ==
KGS No.^{?}	Picture	Name	Street Address	CH1903 X coordinate	CH1903 Y coordinate	Location
11621	Hergiswald Bridge	Hergiswald Bridge		661.060	208.472	47.024478°N 8.241836°E
3713	Pilgrimage Church Unser Liebe Frau im Hergiswald with Kaplanei	Pilgrimage Church Unser Liebe Frau im Hergiswald with Kaplanei		660.610	208.280	47.022792°N 8.235892°E
Unknown		ISOS Spezialfall: Wallfahrtsort Hergiswald				

== Luthern ==
KGS No.^{?}	Picture	Name	Street Address	CH1903 X coordinate	CH1903 Y coordinate	Location
Unknown		ISOS Dorf: Luthern				

== Luzern ==
KGS No.^{?}	Picture	Name	Street Address	CH1903 X coordinate	CH1903 Y coordinate	Location
9589	Old City, Medieval / Early Modern City	Old City, Medieval / Early Modern City		665.750	211.600	47.052164°N 8.303979°E
3748	Am Rhyn-Haus	Am Rhyn-Haus	Furrengasse 21	665.934	211.583	47.051993°N 8.306398°E
3751	Atelierhaus Blaesi	Atelierhaus Blaesi	Adligenswilerstrasse 31	666.985	212.137	47.056871°N 8.320311°E
8494/extendedHtmlPopup 3720, 8494	Bourbaki Panorama	Bourbaki Panorama	Löwenplatz 11	666.297	212.134	47.056913°N 8.311256°E
3721	Paddle Steam Ship Gallia SGV (1913)	Paddle Steam Ship Gallia SGV (1913)	Werftstrasse	666.700	211.200	47.048471°N 8.316422°E
3722	Paddle Steam Ship Schiller SGV (1906)	Paddle Steam Ship Schiller SGV (1906)	Werftstrasse	666.700	211.200	47.048471°N 8.316422°E
3723	Paddle Steam Ship Stadt Luzern SGV (1928)	Paddle Steam Ship Stadt Luzern SGV (1928)	Werftstrasse Dampfschiff Stadt Luzern SGV (1928),	666.700	211.200	47.048471°N 8.316422°E
3724	Paddle Steam Ship Unterwalden SGV (1902)	Paddle Steam Ship Unterwalden SGV (1902)	Werftstrasse	666.700	211.200	47.048471°N 8.316422°E
3725	Paddle Steam Ship Uri SGV (1901)	Paddle Steam Ship Uri SGV (1901)	Werftstrasse	666.700	211.200	47.048471°N 8.316422°E
10412	Dreilindenpark with Villa and Surrounding Buildings	Dreilindenpark with Villa and Surrounding Buildings	Dreilindenstrasse 91–93	667.108	212.579	47.060834°N 8.321995°E
3758	Dula School House	Dula School House	Bruchstrasse 78	665.705	210.929	47.046133°N 8.303289°E
3726	Former Franciscan Church of St. Maria in der Au	Former Franciscan Church of St. Maria in der Au	Franziskanerplatz 1 a	665.713	211.327	47.049712°N 8.303452°E
3737	Former Ritter‘scher Palast (Administration Building)	Former Ritter‘scher Palast (Administration Building)	Bahnhofstrasse 15	665.777	211.397	47.050336°N 8.304305°E
8498/extendedHtmlPopup 9060, 8498	Former National Bank Building and Rosengart Collection	Former National Bank Building and Rosengart Collection	Pilatusstrasse 10	666.008	211.329	47.049701°N 8.307335°E
8495/extendedHtmlPopup 3744, 8495	Former Armory and Collection of the History Museum	Former Armory and Collection of the History Museum	Pfisterngasse 24, 26	665.581	211.507	47.051344°N 8.301741°E
3763	Felsberg School House	Felsberg School House	Felsbergstrasse 10, 12	666.549	212.278	47.058183°N 8.314593°E
10100	Cemetery Friedental with Crematorium Jewish Cemetery and Memorial Hall	Cemetery Friedental with Crematorium; Jewish Cemetery and Memorial Hall	Friedentalstrasse 40	665.535	212.530	47.06055°N 8.301284°E
3770		Gewerbeschulhaus Heimbach	Heimbachweg 12	665.401	211.004	47.046838°N 8.2993°E
8585/extendedHtmlPopup 3771, 8585	Gletschergarten with Museum	Gletschergarten with Museum	Denkmalstrasse 4	666.215	212.352	47.058882°N 8.310208°E
3727	Grand-Hotel National	Grand-Hotel National	Haldenstrasse 4	666.551	211.888	47.054675°N 8.314562°E
3775	Hammetschwandlift (shared with Ennetbürgen)	Hammetschwandlift (shared with Ennetbürgen)	Bürgenstock	672.816	206.000	47.001057°N 8.396067°E
3796	Main Post Office (Kreispostdirektion)	Main Post Office (Kreispostdirektion)	Bahnhofstrasse 3	666.098	211.444	47.050726°N 8.308536°E
3745	Haus Zurgilgen (zur Gilgen)	Haus Zurgilgen (zur Gilgen)	Kapellplatz 1	666.077	211.659	47.052662°N 8.308291°E
3782	Hotel Montana	Hotel Montana	Adligenswilerstrasse 22	666.935	212.086	47.056417°N 8.319645°E
3784	Hotel Schweizerhof	Hotel Schweizerhof	Schweizerhofquai 3	666.218	211.871	47.054555°N 8.310177°E
10634/extendedHtmlPopup 3728, 10634	Jesuit Church of St. Franz Xaver with Sacristy and Church Treasure	Jesuit Church of St. Franz Xaver with Sacristy and Church Treasure	Bahnhofstrasse 11 a / Hirschengraben 8	665.840	211.409	47.050437°N 8.305136°E
3729	Kapellbrücke with Paintings and Wasserturm	Kapellbrücke with Paintings and Wasserturm	Wesemlinstrasse 42	666.004	211.500	47.051239°N 8.307307°E
9336, 8905/extendedHtmlPopup 3791, 9336, 8905	Capuchin Monastery auf dem Wesemlin and Library and Provincial Archive of the Swiss Capuchins (German: Provinzarchiv der Schweizer Kapuziner or PAL)	Capuchin Monastery auf dem Wesemlin and Library and Provincial Archive of the Swiss Capuchins (German: Provinzarchiv der Schweizer Kapuziner or PAL)	Wesemlinstrasse 42	666.449	212.670	47.061719°N 8.313335°E
3792	Allmend Barracks	Allmend Barracks	Murmattweg 6	665.438	209.693	47.035043°N 8.299598°E
3787	Catholic Pauluskirche	Catholic Pauluskirche	Moosmattstrasse 2	665.697	210.463	47.041943°N 8.303117°E
3788	St. Karl's Church	St. Karl's Church	St. Karlistrasse 23	664.859	211.986	47.055724°N 8.292309°E
8505/extendedHtmlPopup 3799, 8505	Landsitz Tribschen and Richard Wagner Museum	Landsitz Tribschen and Richard Wagner Museum	Wagnerweg 27	667.668	210.535	47.042392°N 8.329061°E
3732	Löwendenkmal with Chapel	Löwendenkmal with Chapel	Denkmalstrasse	666.284	212.294	47.058353°N 8.311108°E
10102	Mühlesporne	Mühlesporne	Nadelwehr	666.284	212.294	47.058353°N 8.311108°E
3807	Museggmagazin	Museggmagazin	Museggstrasse 37	665.629	211.697	47.053049°N 8.302401°E
3736	Rathaus (Town council house)	Rathaus (Town council house)	Kornmarkt 3	665.914	211.574	47.051914°N 8.306133°E
8497	Collection at the Natural History Museum	Collection at the Natural History Museum	Kasernenplatz 6	665.526	211.543	47.051674°N 8.301023°E
8496	Art Museum Collection	Art Museum Collection	Europaplatz 1	666.362	211.409	47.050385°N 8.312005°E
8841/extendedHtmlPopup 3823, 8841	Schweizerische Unfallversicherungsanstalt SUVA and the Archive of the SUVA	Schweizerische Unfallversicherungsanstalt SUVA and the Archive of the SUVA	Fluhmattstrasse 1	666.142	212.067	47.056326°N 8.309206°E
3738	Spreuer Bridge	Spreuer Bridge		665.570	211.560	47.051822°N 8.301604°E
8790	Regional Archive of the Canton of Lucerne	Regional Archive of the Canton of Lucerne	Schützenstrasse 9	665.428	211.416	47.050541°N 8.299715°E
8869		City Archive of Luzern	Industriestrasse 6	666.290	210.407	47.04138°N 8.310911°E
10103	City Fortifications (not including the bridges)	City Fortifications (not including the bridges)		665.764	211.836	47.054285°N 8.304197°E
3767	Collegiate church Yard im Hof	Collegiate church Yard im Hof	St. Leodegarstrasse 3 – 7	666.412	211.981	47.055525°N 8.312747°E
10635/extendedHtmlPopup 3740, 10635	Collegiate church St. Leodegar and Mauritius with Church Treasures	Collegiate church St. Leodegar and Mauritius with Church Treasures	St. Leodegarstrasse 5 a–d	666.515	211.985	47.055551°N 8.314103°E
8779/extendedHtmlPopup 8499, 8779	Verkehrshaus of the Schweiz and Verkehrsarchiv des Verkehrshauses	Verkehrshaus of the Schweiz and Verkehrsarchiv des Verkehrshauses	Lidostrasse 5	668.175	211.735	47.053133°N 8.335912°E
8832/extendedHtmlPopup 10104, 8832	Administration Building of the Gotthardbahn and Archives of the Bundesverwaltungsgerichts, Sozialrechtliche Abteilungen	Administration Building of the Gotthardbahn and Archives of the Bundesverwaltungsgerichts, Sozialrechtliche Abteilungen	Schweizerhofquai 6	666.347	211.919	47.054974°N 8.311882°E
3742	Villa Bellerive with Park	Villa Bellerive with Park	Bellerivestrasse 19	667.721	212.150	47.056913°N 8.329999°E
9335, 8930/extendedHtmlPopup 3743, 9335, 8930	Central and University Library of Lucerne with Musical and Special Collection	Central and University Library of Lucerne with Musical and Special Collection	Sempacherstrasse 10	666.011	211.175	47.048316°N 8.307352°E
Unknown		ISOS Stadt: Luzern				

== Malters ==
KGS No.^{?}	Picture	Name	Street Address	CH1903 X coordinate	CH1903 Y coordinate	Location
3837	Pilgrimage Chapel St. Jost In Blatten with Kaplanei	Pilgrimage Chapel St. Jost In Blatten with Kaplanei	Luzernstrasse 149/150	659.720	210.280	47.040862°N 8.224449°E
Unknown		ISOS Weiler: Blatten				

== Marbach ==
KGS No.^{?}	Picture	Name	Street Address	CH1903 X coordinate	CH1903 Y coordinate	Location
Unknown		ISOS Dorf: Marbach				

== Mauensee ==
KGS No.^{?}	Picture	Name	Street Address	CH1903 X coordinate	CH1903 Y coordinate	Location
11750		Wauwilermoos (Egolzwil, Wauwil, Schötz, Ettiswil, Mauensee), Paleolithic-Neolithic Lake Shore Settlement		644.530	225.500	47.178955°N 8.026082°E
Unknown		ISOS Spezialfall: Mauensee				

== Meggen ==
KGS No.^{?}	Picture	Name	Street Address	CH1903 X coordinate	CH1903 Y coordinate	Location
3840	Catholic Piuskirche	Catholic Piuskirche	Schlösslistrasse 101	670.957	211.014	47.046357°N 8.372411°E
3844	Meggenhorn Castle	Meggenhorn Castle	Meggenhorn	669.741	209.760	47.035207°N 8.356217°E
Unknown		ISOS Spezialfall: Villenlandschaft Meggen				

== Meierskappel ==
KGS No.^{?}	Picture	Name	Street Address	CH1903 X coordinate	CH1903 Y coordinate	Location
3845	Farm House Hinterspichten	Farm House Hinterspichten	Hinterspichten 23	676.469	218.796	47.115737°N 8.446254°E

== Menznau ==
KGS No.^{?}	Picture	Name	Street Address	CH1903 X coordinate	CH1903 Y coordinate	Location
Unknown		ISOS Weiler: Geiss				

== Neudorf ==
KGS No.^{?}	Picture	Name	Street Address	CH1903 X coordinate	CH1903 Y coordinate	Location
3847	Pilgrimage Chapel Gormund with Kaplanei	Pilgrimage Chapel Gormund with Kaplanei	Gormund 7	659.246	223.482	47.15965°N 8.219942°E

== Nottwil ==
KGS No.^{?}	Picture	Name	Street Address	CH1903 X coordinate	CH1903 Y coordinate	Location
3851	Farm House Mittler-Huprächtigen	Farm House Mittler-Huprächtigen	Huprächtigen	653.765	218.653	47.116683°N 8.14709°E

== Pfaffnau ==
KGS No.^{?}	Picture	Name	Street Address	CH1903 X coordinate	CH1903 Y coordinate	Location
3855	Former Monastery of St. Urban	Former Monastery of St. Urban	Sankt Urban 168 – 171 E	630.403	231.302	47.231941°N 7.840113°E
3858	Catholic Parish Church of St. Vinzenz with Cemetery Chapel	Catholic Parish Church of St. Vinzenz with Cemetery Chapel		634.799	230.935	47.228424°N 7.898133°E
3859	Rectory with Tithe barn	Rectory with Tithe barn	Altweg 7 a	634.807	231.021	47.229197°N 7.898245°E

== Reiden ==
KGS No.^{?}	Picture	Name	Street Address	CH1903 X coordinate	CH1903 Y coordinate	Location
9590		Stumpen; Early-Paleolithic Settlement		640.220	233.850	47.254335°N 7.969972°E

== Root ==
KGS No.^{?}	Picture	Name	Street Address	CH1903 X coordinate	CH1903 Y coordinate	Location
Unknown		ISOS Spezialfall: Perlen (zusammen with Buchrain)				

== Rothenburg ==
KGS No.^{?}	Picture	Name	Street Address	CH1903 X coordinate	CH1903 Y coordinate	Location
3873	Rothenburger Brücke (Bridge)	Rothenburger Brücke (Bridge)	Bertiswilstrasse / Rothenburgstrasse	663.451	216.158	47.093385°N 8.274363°E

== Ruswil ==
KGS No.^{?}	Picture	Name	Street Address	CH1903 X coordinate	CH1903 Y coordinate	Location
3874		Farm House Unter Rot	Under Rot 112	651.761	217.601	47.107381°N 8.120565°E
3875	Catholic Church of St. Mauritius	Catholic Church of St. Mauritius	Pfarrhofstrasse 2	652.250	215.120	47.085027°N 8.12672°E
Unknown		ISOS Dorf: Ruswil				
Unknown		ISOS Spezialfall: Monastery Werthenstein				

== Schötz ==
KGS No.^{?}	Picture	Name	Street Address	CH1903 X coordinate	CH1903 Y coordinate	Location
3883	Farm House Hinter Buttenberg	Farm House Hinter Buttenberg	Buttenberg	641.074	222.547	47.152617°N 7.980223°E
11761		Wauwilermoos (Egolzwil, Wauwil, Schötz, Ettiswil, Mauensee), Paleolithic-Neolithic Lake Shore Settlement		644.530	225.500	47.178955°N 8.026082°E
Unknown		ISOS Spezialfall: Landscapes Kastelen				

== Schwarzenberg ==
KGS No.^{?}	Picture	Name	Street Address	CH1903 X coordinate	CH1903 Y coordinate	Location
10107	Farm House Scharmoos	Farm House Scharmoos	Scharmoos 95	657.925	208.413	47.024228°N 8.200593°E

== Sempach ==
KGS No.^{?}	Picture	Name	Street Address	CH1903 X coordinate	CH1903 Y coordinate	Location
3891	Catholic Church St. Martin Auf Kirchbühl with Charnel house	Catholic Church St. Martin Auf Kirchbühl with Charnel house	Kirchbühl 259	656.740	221.850	47.14519°N 8.186691°E
3896	Rathaus (Town council house) with a fountain	Rathaus (Town council house) with a fountain	Stadtstrasse 28	657.093	220.820	47.135896°N 8.191214°E
3892	Schlachtkapelle St. Jakob	Schlachtkapelle St. Jakob	Schlacht / Sempacherstrasse	658.674	221.964	47.146047°N 8.212202°E
Unknown		ISOS Kleinstadt / Flecken: Sempach				
Unknown		ISOS Weiler: Kirchbühl				

== Sursee ==
KGS No.^{?}	Picture	Name	Street Address	CH1903 X coordinate	CH1903 Y coordinate	Location
9337	Museum of the Swiss Capuchin Monks and Monastery Library of the former Capuchin Monastery of Sursee	Museum of the Swiss Capuchin Monks and Monastery Library of the former Capuchin Monastery of Sursee	Geuenseestrasse 2 a	650.958	224.992	47.173922°N 8.11082°E
3906		Neolithic to Early Modern Settlement		651.000	225.000	47.17399°N 8.111375°E
3899	Rathaus (Town council house)	Rathaus (Town council house)		650.849	224.860	47.172743°N 8.109367°E
8575/extendedHtmlPopup 3900, 8575	St. Urbanhof with City Museum	St. Urbanhof with City Museum	Theaterstrasse 9	650.850	224.960	47.173642°N 8.109392°E
3901	Pilgrimage Church of Mariazell with Zellkapelle	Pilgrimage Church of Mariazell with Zellkapelle		651.660	224.940	47.173399°N 8.120074°E
Unknown		ISOS Kleinstadt / Flecken: Sursee				

== Udligenswil ==
KGS No.^{?}	Picture	Name	Street Address	CH1903 X coordinate	CH1903 Y coordinate	Location
9143	Otto Pfeifer House	Otto Pfeifer House	Haasenberg	671.991	216.048	47.091523°N 8.386817°E

== Vitznau ==
KGS No.^{?}	Picture	Name	Street Address	CH1903 X coordinate	CH1903 Y coordinate	Location
9621	Steigfadbalm, Paleolithic Cave Dwelling	Steigfadbalm, Paleolithic Cave Dwelling		680.250	207.925	47.017514°N 8.494144°E

== Wauwil ==
KGS No.^{?}	Picture	Name	Street Address	CH1903 X coordinate	CH1903 Y coordinate	Location
9622	Wauwilermoos (Egolzwil, Wauwil, Schötz, Ettiswil, Mauensee), Paleolithic-Neolithic Lake Shore Settlement	Wauwilermoos (Egolzwil, Wauwil, Schötz, Ettiswil, Mauensee), Paleolithic-Neolithic Lake Shore Settlement		644.530	225.500	47.178955°N 8.026082°E

== Werthenstein ==
KGS No.^{?}	Picture	Name	Street Address	CH1903 X coordinate	CH1903 Y coordinate	Location
3914	Wallfahrtskirche U. L. Frau	Wallfahrtskirche U. L. Frau	Oberdorf	650.500	211.700	47.054401°N 8.103294°E
Unknown		ISOS Spezialfall: Monastery Werthenstein				

== Willisau ==
KGS No.^{?}	Picture	Name	Street Address	CH1903 X coordinate	CH1903 Y coordinate	Location
9623	Old City, Medieval / Early Modern City	Old City, Medieval / Early Modern City		641.900	219.000	47.120661°N 7.990785°E
3919	Catholic Church of St. Peter and Paul	Catholic Church of St. Peter and Paul		641.837	218.920	47.119946°N 7.989947°E
3920	Landvogteischloss Bailiff's Castle	Landvogteischloss; Bailiff's Castle	Schlossstrasse 3	641.882	218.850	47.119313°N 7.990534°E
3921	Pilgrimage Chapel Heiligblut	Pilgrimage Chapel Heiligblut		641.745	218.964	47.120347°N 7.988739°E
Unknown		ISOS Kleinstadt / Flecken: Willisau				
