= Lucerne-Land District =

Coordinates: 47°10′N 8°10′E

Lucerne-Land District Wahlkreis Luzern-Land
- District
- Interactive map of Lucerne-Land District
- Country: Switzerland
- Canton: Luzern

Area
  - Total: 230.86 km^{2} (89.14 sq mi)

Population (2020)
  - Total: 104,751
  - Density: 453.74/km^{2} (1,175.2/sq mi)
- Time zone: UTC+1 (CET)
  - Summer (DST): UTC+2 (CEST)
- Municipalities: 17

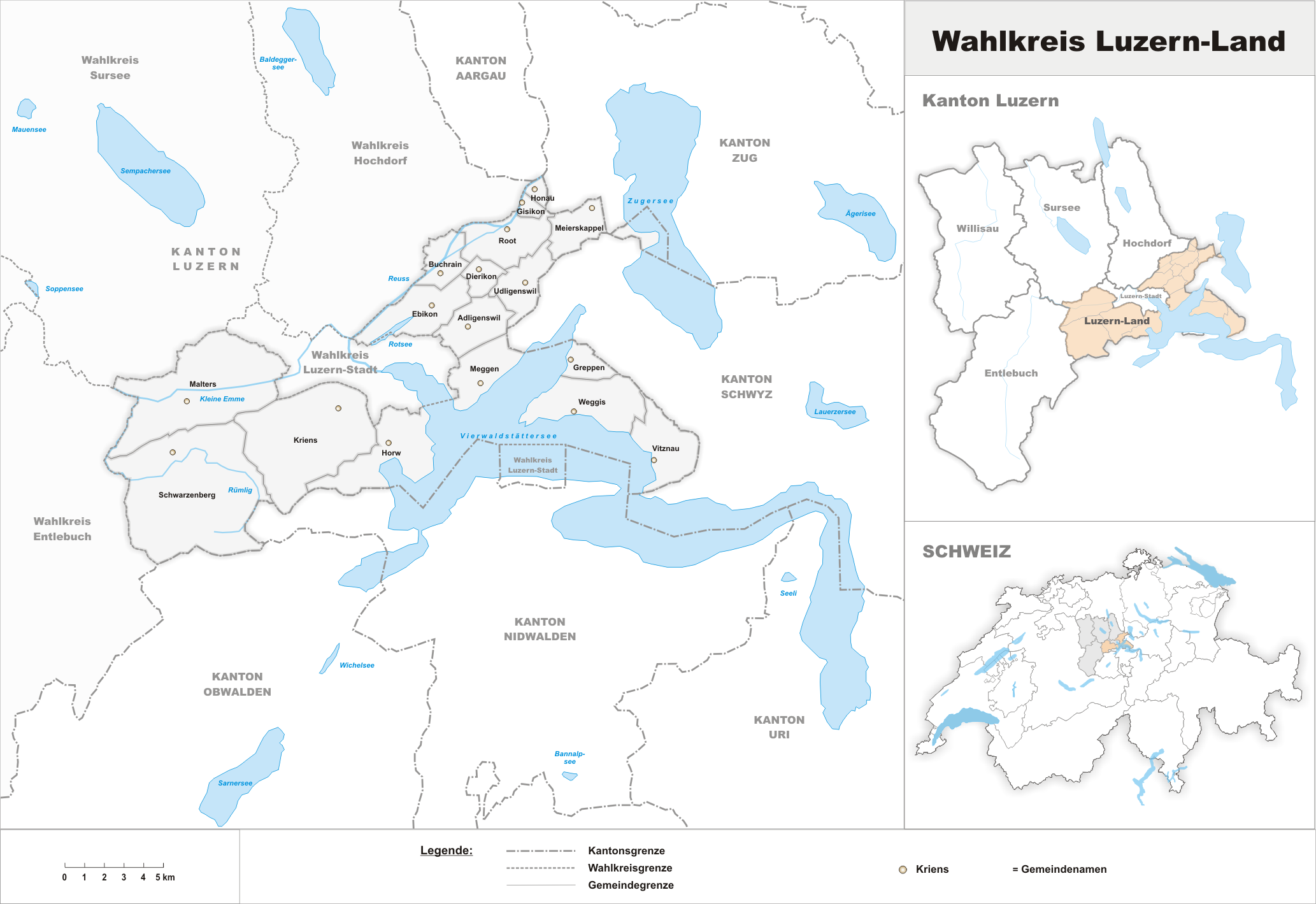
Municipalities in the district of Luzern-Land

Lucerne-Land District (German: Wahlkreis Luzern-Land) is one of the two new Wahlkreis formed from the former Lucerne Amt in 2013 in the Canton of Lucerne, Switzerland. It has a population of 104,751 (as of 31 December 2020) and includes everything but the city of Lucerne from the old Amt.

Municipalities	Population (31 December 2020)	Area (km^{2})
Adligenswil	5,471	6.99
Buchrain	6,400	4.80
Dierikon	1,579	2.78
Ebikon	14,066	9.69
Gisikon	1,421	1.08
Greppen	1,185	5.25
Honau	414	1.25
Horw	14,211	20.43
Kriens	28,245	27.31
Malters	7,410	28.57
Meggen	7,562	13.93
Meierskappel	1,477	9.23
Root	5,335	8.65
Schwarzenberg	1,738	39.31
Udligenswil	2,371	6.22
Vitznau	1,426	11.76
Weggis	4,440	25.29
District of Lucerne	104,751	259.92

== Mergers ==
The new Wahlkreis was created on 1 January 2013.
