= Lieli family =

Medieval noble family from Lucerne

The Lieli family (also von Lieli) was a medieval family of the lower nobility from the Seetal in the canton of Lucerne, Switzerland, probably free (Freie) in origin. From their first appearance in 1223 they were ministeriales and retainers of the counts of Kyburg, mostly knights. Their ancestral seat was Nünegg Castle in Lieli. The family died out in the male line before 1357 and in the female line before 1400.

== History ==
Ruins of Nünegg Castle, the family's ancestral seat

From their first appearance in 1223 the Lielis were Kyburg ministeriales and retainers, mostly knights. The family was small, with five known generations. They intermarried with the von Baldegg and von Hallwyl families and with the free barons (Freie) of Bonstetten and of Grünenberg. As allodial property (freies Eigen) the Lielis owned their ancestral seat, the ruin of Nünegg in Lieli, and the low-court lordships of Lieli, Sulz and Mosen. They held as a fief from the territorial lord the Grünenberg tower near Richensee, which was probably built in the 13th century as a result of a division of the family and its property. Both seats were destroyed around 1386, but Grünenberg was later inhabited again.

The Lielis also owned scattered property in the Seetal and the Freiamt, the fishing rights on Lake Hallwil held as a Kyburg fief, and Habsburg pledge revenues. They made larger donations to the commanderies of the Knights of St. John at Hohenrain and of the Teutonic Knights at Hitzkirch. The family died out in the male line before 1357 and in the female line before 1400. The lordship was inherited by the von Schönau and the von Grünenberg, who sold it to the lordship of Heidegg in 1431 and 1437 respectively.

== Bibliography ==
- Genealogisches Handbuch zur Schweizer Geschichte, 3, pp. 273–279 (with genealogical table)
- J.-J. Siegrist, "Die Herren von Liele und ihre Herrschaft", in Heimatkunde aus dem Seetal 46, 1973, pp. 44–64
