= Jean Rudolf von Salis =

Swiss historian and writer (1901–1996)

- Jean-Rodolphe von Salis
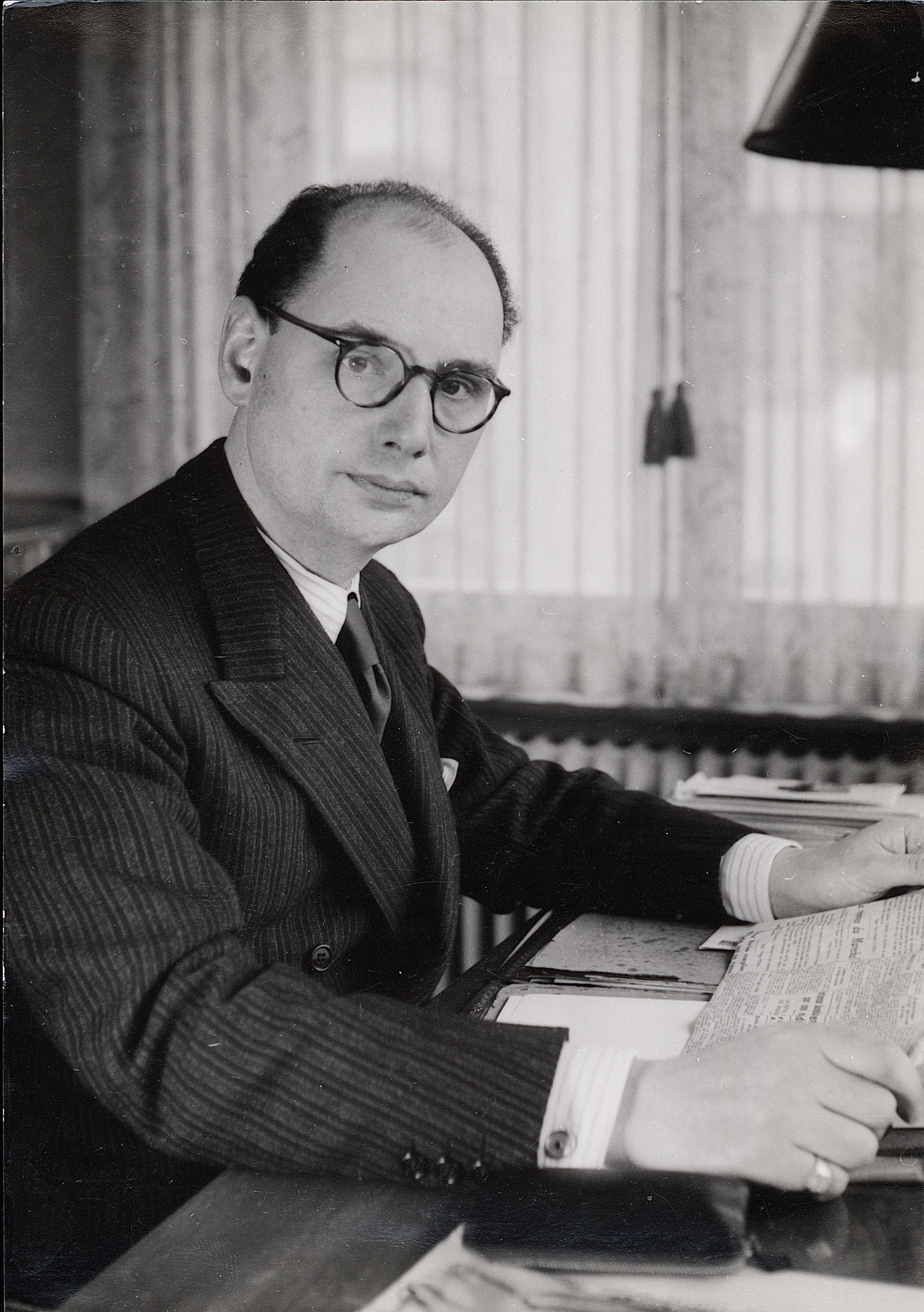
- von Salis in 1941
- Born: 12 December 1901; Bern, Switzerland
- Died: 14 July 1996 (aged 94); Brunegg, Switzerland
- Known for: Radio commentary on World War 2

Jean Rudolf von Salis (12 December 1901 – 14 July 1996) was a Swiss historian. He gained prominence with his weekly "Weltchronik" (English: world chronicle) radio broadcasts from 1940 until 1947.

As von Salis never wrote English publications and his works were rarely translated, he is little known outside of the European historical sciences.

== Life and education ==
Jean Rudolf von Salis was born on 12 December 1901 in Bern, and he died on 14 July 1996 at Brunegg Castle, a family heirloom of his mother, Marie Pauline Hünerwadel.

Coming from a very noble Swiss family, von Salis counted more than 30 generals of different armies among his ancestors (one of them a Royal Navy admiral), as well as several diplomats, politicians, and the poet Johann Gaudenz.

As the son of a medical doctor, Adolf von Salis, he began to study history in 1920. After visiting the universities of Montpellier (France), Bern, Berlin and Paris (Sorbonne), in 1932 he finished his studies by writing a PhD thesis on Jean Charles Léonard de Sismondi, a Swiss historian and political economist.

He was married to his wife Elsie, and he had two children, Adolf and Marie, and his copious correspondence with fellow authors – the most prominent of them Rainer Maria Rilke – has been partially published.

== Journalism and teaching ==
In 1926, he began to report from Paris for several Swiss newspapers, and from 1930 until 1935, he worked as a correspondent for Der Bund, the main newspaper in Bern.

In 1935, the Swiss Federal Institute of Technology in Zurich hired him as a professor of history, a position he kept until 1968.

== Weltchronik ==
In 1940, the Federal Council of Switzerland tasked von Salis with producing a weekly radio broadcast that featured reports, analyses and commentary on the Second World War. Given that the "Landessender Beromünster" (country radio station Beromünster) medium wave at the Blosenberg tower could be received in large areas of Europe, von Salis' reports earned respect as one of the few objective and neutral news sources during the War.

As he was taking a clear stance against national socialism, the German government demanded the Federal Council to replace von Salis several times. Though these attempts were not successful, von Salis was not allowed to mention negative events in Germany, as well as the genocide against the European Jews.

In 1966, the "Weltchronik" episodes were published in print.

== Later life ==
After the war, von Salis proposed rapprochement towards Europe, and from 1946 until 1965 he was a member of the Swiss UNESCO commission and Swiss delegate at the UNESCO conferences.

From 1951 until 1960, he edited his main work, "Weltgeschichte der neuesten Zeit" (literally "World history in the newest time"), a three-volume book on world history from the Franco-Prussian war (1871) until 1945.

== Works ==
- Jean Rudolf von Salis in libraries (WorldCat catalog)

German (selection)

- von Salis, Jean Rudolf (1966). Weltchronik, 1939-1945 [World chronicle, 1939-1945] (in German). Zürich: Orell Füssli.
- von Salis, Jean Rudolf (1980). Weltgeschichte der neuesten Zeit (in German). Zürich: Orell Füssli. (New edition, three volumes with two sub-volumes each.)
- von Salis, Jean Rudolf. Grenzüberschreitungen. Ein Lebensbericht [Frontier crossings. A life's report.] (in German). Zürich: Orell Füssli. Biography in two volumes, covering the years 1901-1939 (published 1975) and 1939-1978 (1978).

Translated into English

- von Salis, Jean-Rodolphe (1971). Switzerland and Europe: essays and reflections. Wolff. ISBN 0854961240.
