= Kastelen Tower Ruins =

Ruined castle in Alberswil, Lucerne, Switzerland

Kastelen Tower
- Alberswil
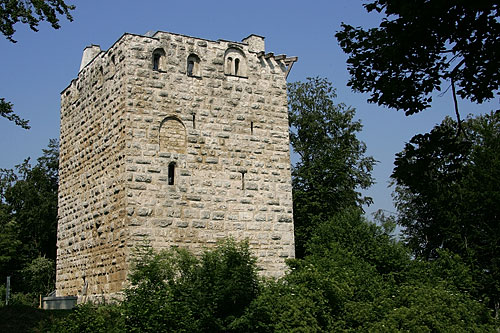
- Ruins of Kastelen Tower

Site information
- Type: hill castle
- Code: CH-LU
- Condition: ruin

Location
- Location within Switzerland
- Coordinates: 47°08′49″N 7°59′35″E

Site history
- Built: 1252

Kastelen Tower is a ruined castle in the municipality of Alberswil of the Canton of Lucerne in Switzerland. It is a Swiss heritage site of national significance.

== History ==
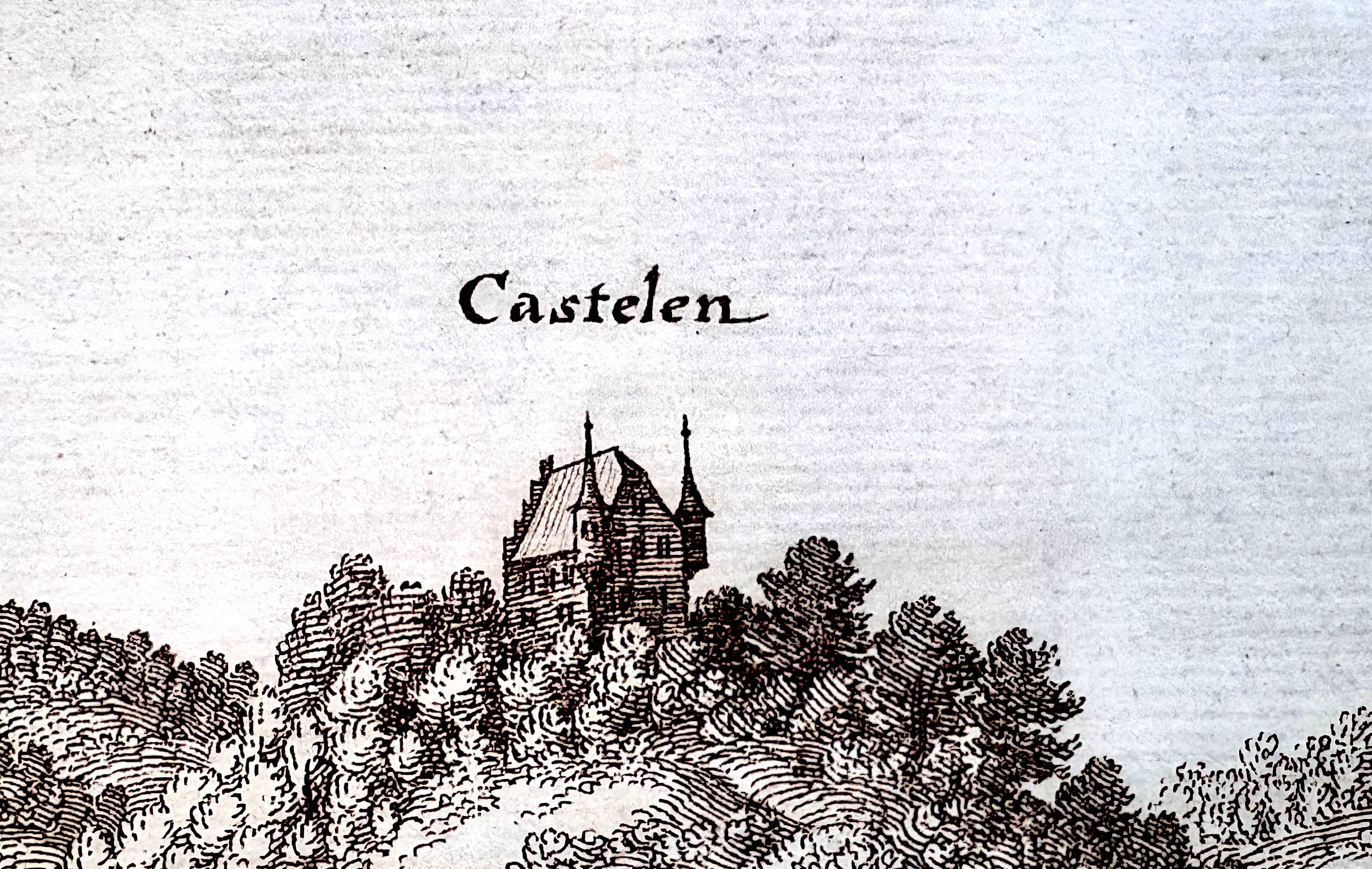
Kastelen in Matthäus Merian's Topographia Helvetiae (around 1650)

Kastelen is first mentioned in 1258 as Kasteln. The fortified tower was probably built by the Kyburgs in the middle of the 13th century on a prominent hill, on the site of an older earthwork castle. The Kyburgs used it for representation and as an administrative center, to which they assigned their possessions around Sursee and the imperial advocacy (Reichsvogtei) of Beromünster. In 1273 Kastelen was acquired by Rudolf I of Habsburg. Around 1306 the Habsburg office (Amt) of Kastelen formed only an enclave within the office of Willisau, with local lordship (Twing) and advocacy rights in Kottwil, Niederwil and Briseck and the church advocacy of Burgrain.

The fortress was held by Austrian and later Lucerne vassals: in the 14th century by the lords of Winterberg and Gottfried Müllner, and from 1367 jointly by the Rust and von Luternau families. In 1416 the then lord of Kastelen, Peter von Luternau, took up the citizenship (Burgrecht) of Lucerne together with his lordship. Hans Feer acquired Kastelen in 1482, and Ulrich Heinserlin in 1598; after his family's bankruptcy, Heinserlin ceded the lordship to the city in 1644.

After 1357 the Rust and von Luternau families added to the lordship the Twing and toll of Ettiswil (only half of them from 1385), the Twinge of Alberswil, Bodenberg and Nebikon (half), an eighth of the Twing of Schötz, and the Twing and tithe of Fischbach. Around 1604 Ulrich Heinserlin added the Twing of Zell and half of the Twinge of Schötz and Nebikon. In 1664 the council of Lucerne sold the Twing rights in Schötz, Nebikon and Ettiswil to the lordship of Wyher. In the Peasants' War of 1653 the people of Alberswil and Ettiswil who owed labor services damaged the uninhabited tower. In 1680 Lucerne sold Kastelen to Franz von Sonnenberg, Grand Prior of the Order of Saint John, who established a family entail (Familienfideikommiss) there. A small country manor (Landschlösschen) was built in 1682; it is still owned by the Sonnenberg family.

== See also ==
- List of castles in Switzerland

== Bibliography ==
- A. P. von Segesser, Rechtsgeschichte der Stadt und Republik Luzern, vol. 1, 1850, pp. 653–657
- A. Sautier, Die Familienfideikommisse der Stadt und Republik Luzern, 1909, pp. 137–159
- Die Kunstdenkmäler des Kantons Luzern, vol. 5, 1959, pp. 7–12
- W. Meyer, "Burgenbau im kyburgischen Machtbereich", in Die Grafen von Kyburg, 1981, pp. 75, 82
- F. Daxecker, "Ein Brief von P. Johann Baptist Cysat SJ – Dokument zur Rechtsgeschichte der Burg Kasteln bei Alberswil", in Sammelblatt des Historischen Vereins Ingolstadt 104, 1995, pp. 241–255
