= Ebikon =

- Municipality
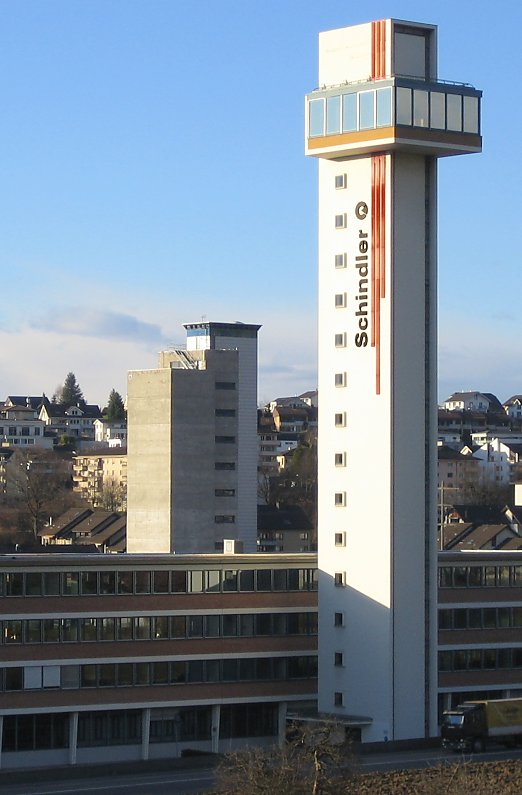

- Coat of arms
- Location of Ebikon
- Location within Switzerland Location within Canton of Lucerne
- Coordinates: 47°5′N 8°20′E
- Country: Switzerland
- Canton: Lucerne
- District: Lucerne-Land

Government
  - Executive: Gemeinderat with 5 members
  - Mayor: Gemeindepräsident

Area
  - Total: 9.68 km^{2} (3.74 sq mi)
- Elevation: 420 m (1,380 ft)

Population (December 2020)
  - Total: 14,066
  - Density: 1,450/km^{2} (3,760/sq mi)
- Time zone: UTC+01:00 (CET)
  - Summer (DST): UTC+02:00 (CEST)
- Postal code: 6030
- SFOS number: 1054
- ISO 3166 code: CH-LU
- Surrounded by: Adligenswil, Buchrain, Dierikon, Emmen, Lucerne (Luzern)
- Twin towns: Embd (Switzerland)
- Website: www.ebikon.ch

Ebikon is a municipality in the district of Lucerne-Land in the canton of Lucerne in Switzerland.

== History ==
Ebikon was first mentioned during the late 9th century as marcha Abinchova.

== Geography ==
Aerial view (1970)

Ebikon has an area of 9.7 km^{2} (3.7 sq mi). Of this area, 38.4% is used for agricultural purposes, while 23.9% is forested. Of the rest of the land, 30.3% is settled (buildings or roads) and the remainder (7.3%) is non-productive (rivers, glaciers or mountains). In the 1997 land survey, 23.94% of the total land area was forested. Of the agricultural land, 34.06% is used for farming or pastures, while 4.33% is used for orchards or vine crops. Of the settled areas, 15.69% is covered with buildings, 1.75% is industrial, 1.55% is classed as special developments, 1.14% is parks or greenbelts and 10.22% is transportation infrastructure. Of the unproductive areas, 4.13% is unproductive standing water (ponds or lakes), 2.58% is unproductive flowing water (rivers) and 0.62% is other unproductive land.

The municipality is located along the old highway between Lucerne and Zürich. It consists of the linear village of Ebikon and the greater part of the Rotsee or Red Lake, the upper Ron valley (Rontal) and the town section of Rathausen.

== Demographics ==
Ebikon has a population (as of 31 December 2020) of 14,066. As of 2007, 20.7% of the population was made up of foreign nationals. Over the last 10 years the population has grown at a rate of 5.3%. Most of the population (as of 2000) speaks German (86.5%), with Serbo-Croatian being second most common ( 3.0%) and Italian being third ( 2.9%).

In the 2007 election the most popular party was the SVP which received 29.6% of the vote. The next three most popular parties were the CVP (27.1%), the FDP (17.2%) and the SPS (14.8%).

The age distribution in Ebikon is; 2,627 people or 22.4% of the population is 0–19 years old. 3,132 people or 26.7% are 20–39 years old, and 4,242 people or 36.1% are 40–64 years old. The senior population distribution is 1,315 people or 11.2% are 65–79 years old, 375 or 3.2% are 80–89 years old and 57 people or 0.5% of the population are 90+ years old.

In Ebikon about 71.6% of the population (between age 25–64) have completed either non-mandatory upper secondary education or additional higher education (either university or a Fachhochschule).

As of 2000 there are 4,476 households, of which 1,337 households (or about 29.9%) contain only a single individual. 324 or about 7.2% are large households, with at least five members. As of 2000 there were 1,679 inhabited buildings in the municipality, of which 1,479 were built only as housing, and 200 were mixed use buildings. There were 978 single family homes, 123 double family homes, and 378 multi-family homes in the municipality. Most homes were either two (668) or three (516) story structures. There were only 84 single story buildings and 211 four or more story buildings.

Ebikon has an unemployment rate of 2.54%. As of 2005, there were 114 people employed in the primary economic sector and about 30 businesses involved in this sector. 2293 people are employed in the secondary sector and there are 90 businesses in this sector. 2946 people are employed in the tertiary sector, with 319 businesses in this sector. As of 2000 53% of the population of the municipality were employed in some capacity. At the same time, females made up 43.9% of the workforce.

In the 2000 census the religious membership of Ebikon was; 7,683 (67.9%) were Roman Catholic, and 1,569 (13.9%) were Protestant, with an additional 359 (3.17%) that were of some other Christian faith. There are 6 individuals (0.05% of the population) who are Jewish. There are 475 individuals (4.2% of the population) who are Muslim. Of the rest; there were 115 (1.02%) individuals who belong to another religion, 756 (6.68%) who do not belong to any organized religion, 359 (3.17%) who did not answer the question.

The historical population is given in the following table:

| Year | Population |
|---|---|
| 1465 | c. 110 |
| 1695 | c. 300 |
| 1798 | 532 |
| 1850 | 854 |
| 1900 | 1,287 |
| 1930 | 2,240 |
| 1950 | 3,007 |
| 1970 | 7,770 |
| 2000 | 11,322 |

== Notable people ==
- Theodor, Count von Scherer-Boccard (1816–1885), a Swiss journalist and politician. From 1855 he lived in the small castle of Hünenberg in Ebikon.
- Walter Linsenmaier (1917 – 2000 in Ebikon), a Swiss artist and entomologist
