= Götzental Castle =

Castle in Dierikon, Switzerland

Coordinates: 47°05′30″N 8°22′37″E

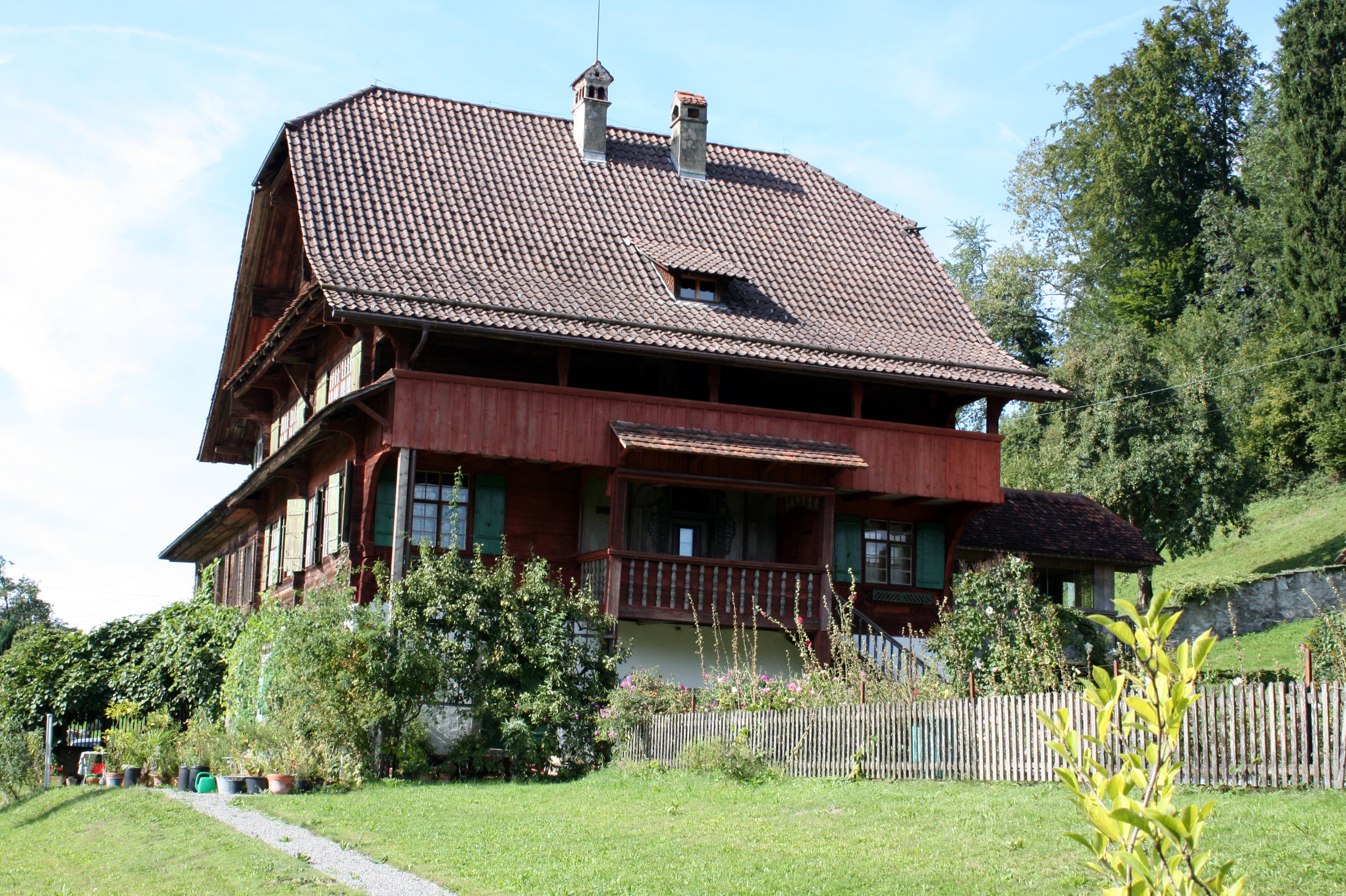
Götzental Castle

Götzental Castle is a castle in the municipality of Dierikon of the Canton of Lucerne in Switzerland. It is a Swiss heritage site of national significance.

== See also ==
- List of castles in Switzerland
