= Kottwil =

Former municipality, canton of Lucerne

- Former municipality
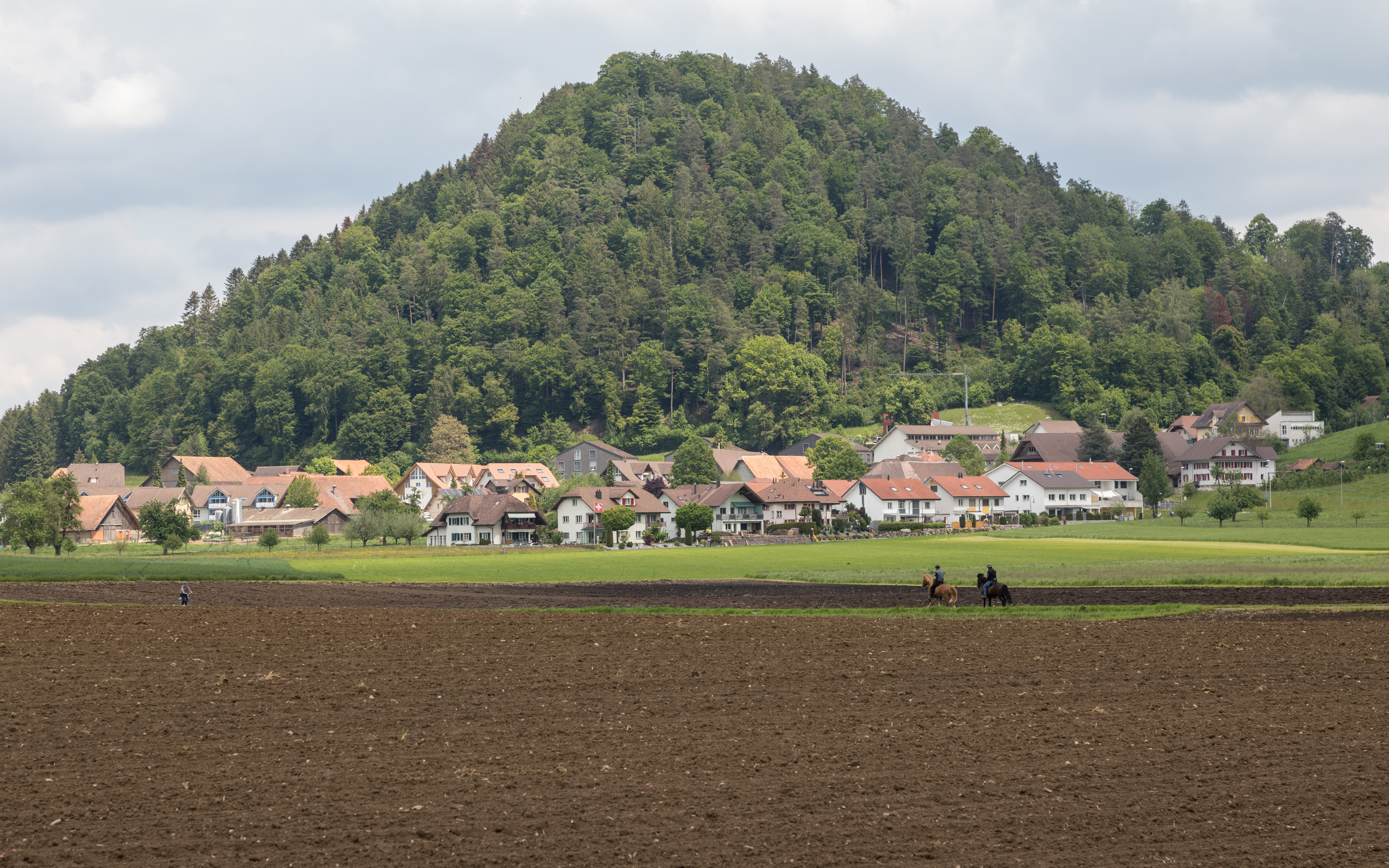
- Location of Kottwil
- Location within Switzerland Location within Canton of Lucerne
- Coordinates: 47°9′42″N 8°2′43″E
- Country: Switzerland
- Canton: Lucerne
- District: Willisau
- Municipality: Ettiswil

Population (2000)
  - Total: 386
- Time zone: UTC+01:00 (CET)
  - Summer (DST): UTC+02:00 (CEST)
- SFOS number: 1133
- ISO 3166 code: CH-LU
- Website: Profile (in German),

Kottwil is a former municipality in the Willisau district of the canton of Lucerne, Switzerland. Since 2006 it has been part of the municipality of Ettiswil. It lies on the southern edge of the Wauwilermoos, on the old route from Sursee to Ettiswil, and comprised the hamlets of Seewagen and Zuswil.

== History ==
Kottwil is first mentioned in 1173 as Chotwile. Settlement finds from the Mesolithic onward have been made in Kottwil. A Roman estate (villa rustica) stood on the Chidli (silver finds from the 3rd century). An Alemannic cemetery and, on the Gütsch, an earthwork (a fortified site) have also been discovered.

From about 1306 to 1481 the bailiwick (Vogtei) of Kottwil belonged to the lordship of Kasteln near Alberswil, held by the Feer family. At some point it passed to the Schnyder family of Sursee, who are recorded as holders of the local lordship (Twingherren) from 1611 to 1798. Kottwil (with Seewagen) and Zuswil each formed a Twing community, and taverns are recorded in both villages in the early modern period, for example in the Hochstudhaus (a house with a ridge-post roof frame) of 1562 in Zuswil. The three-field system was practiced (in Kottwil by an agricultural cooperative of four farms), and land was continually gained by draining the former Lake Wauwil (Wauwilersee).

The boundary of high jurisdiction (Blutgericht), later the boundary between the bailiwicks (Ämter) of Ruswil and Willisau, followed the main road and thus ran through the middle of the village of Kottwil; Zuswil lay in the bailiwick of Ruswil until 1798. During the Helvetic Republic the communities of Kottwil and Zuswil were assigned to the tax district (Steuerbrief) of Grosswangen, and in 1812 and 1819 they were united into one municipality. From 1798 Kottwil belonged to the Helvetic district of Willisau and from 1803 to the district (Amt) of Willisau. It was under the district court of Ettiswil from 1803 to 1814 and under that of Willisau from 1814 to 1913. Until 1807 Kottwil belonged to the parish of Sursee, and then to that of Ettiswil. The chapel of the Seven Sleepers (Siebenschläferkapelle) has a cycle of frescoes from about 1620. Seewagen, one of the most beautiful hamlets in the canton, belongs to the farming village of Kottwil, which was still shaped by agriculture at the beginning of the 21st century.

Kottwil had 271 inhabitants in 1798, 472 in 1850, 418 in 1900, 476 in 1950 and 386 in 2000.

== Bibliography ==
- Die Kunstdenkmäler des Kantons Luzern, vol. 5, 1959, p. 123
- F. Glauser, J. J. Siegrist, Die Luzerner Pfarreien und Landvogteien, 1977
- A. Meyer, "Denkmalpflege im Kanton Luzern", in Jahrbuch der Historischen Gesellschaft Luzern 9, 1991, pp. 77–135, especially pp. 82–91
- A. Ineichen, Innovative Bauern, 1996, p. 244
