= Brunegg =

- Municipality
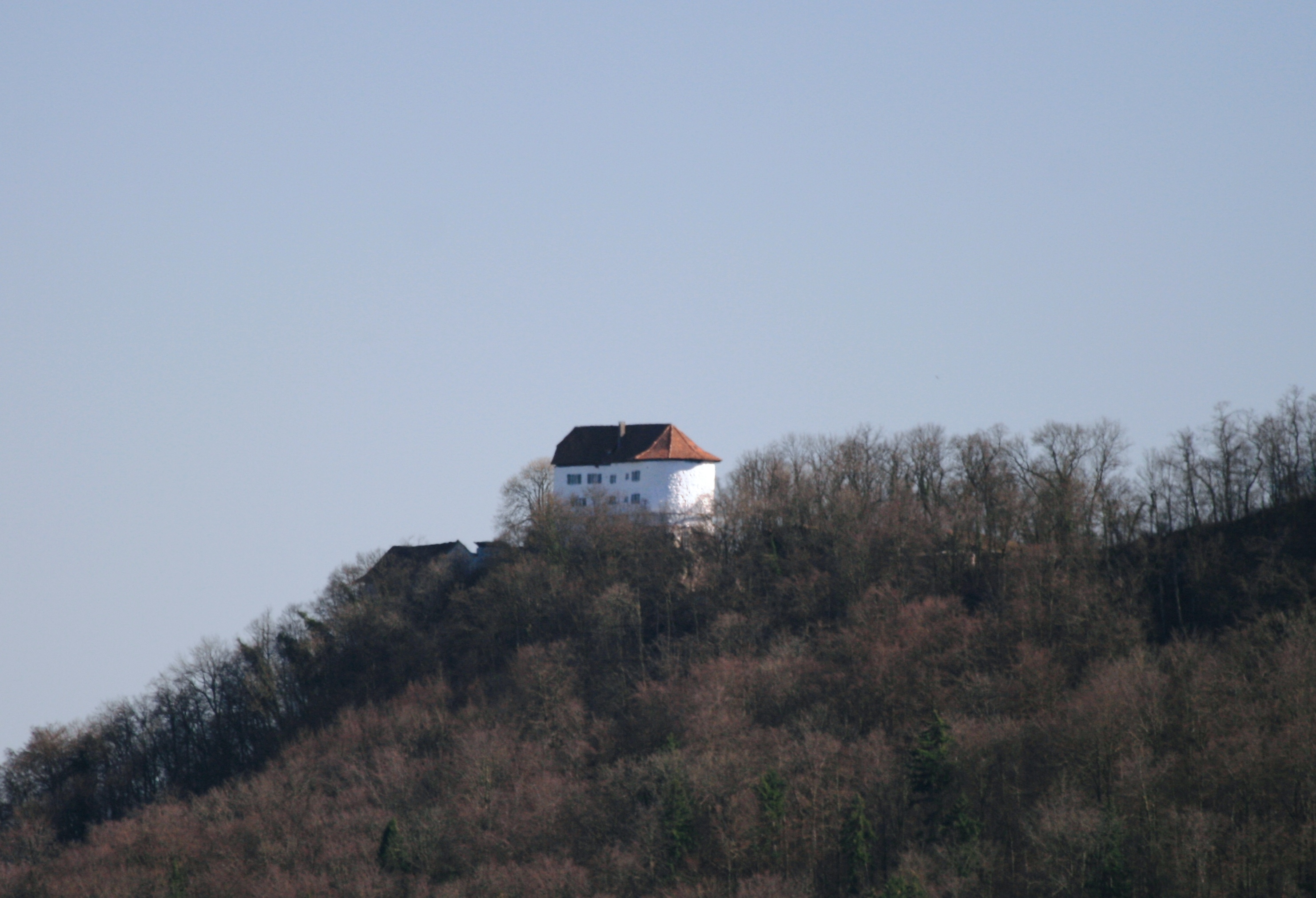

- Flag Coat of arms
- Location of Brunegg
- Location within Switzerland Location within Canton of Aargau
- Coordinates: 47°25′N 8°13′E
- Country: Switzerland
- Canton: Aargau
- District: Lenzburg

Area
  - Total: 1.56 km^{2} (0.60 sq mi)
- Elevation: 423 m (1,388 ft)

Population (December 2020)
  - Total: 866
  - Density: 555/km^{2} (1,440/sq mi)
- Time zone: UTC+01:00 (CET)
  - Summer (DST): UTC+02:00 (CEST)
- Postal code: 5505
- SFOS number: 4193
- ISO 3166 code: CH-AG
- Surrounded by: Birr, Birrhard, Mägenwil, Möriken-Wildegg, Othmarsingen
- Website: www.brunegg.ch

Brunegg is a municipality in the district of Lenzburg in the canton of Aargau in Switzerland.

Aerial view (1946)

== History ==
Brunegg is first mentioned in first half of the 12th century as Bruneco. In 1273 it was mentioned as Brunegge. Brunegg castle was built on a hill at the edge of the Jura Mountains in the 13th century. This castle was probably built, together with Wildegg castle in nearby Wildegg, as part of the Habsburg border defenses. The castle was occupied by Habsburg knights, including Schenken von Brunegg and Gessler von Meienberg. In 1415 the castle was besieged by Bernese troops, but they lifted siege after a counterattack. However, Bern conquered the Aargau, and awarded the fief to the Segenser or Segesser family. Between 1538 and 1798, the castle was subordinate to the governor of Lenzburg. In 1815 it became the property of the Hünerwadel family of Lenzburg. The current owners of the castle, the Salis family, inherited the castle through marriage from the Hünerwadels. For hundreds of years, the castle was poorly maintained, and in the 17th century it was heavily damaged twice through storm and tempest. In 1805–06, the keep and out buildings were repaired and the roof was rebuilt.

The village owes its name and existence to the castle. Initially it belonged to the personal land of the Habsburgs. In the 14th century, they granted the rights to low justice into the hands of the castle owners. Bern placed in the court of Othmarsingen in the Lenzburg district. In the 19th century it was part of the Brugg district though since 1840 it has been in the Lenzburg district.

Originally it was part of the Windisch parish, though since 1526 it has belonged to the Birr parish. Brunegg has had its own Reformed Church since 1967.

Brunegg remained a farming village with a little grain and viticulture on the mountain slopes until the 20th century. In 1950, 24% of the workers were in the agricultural sector. In 1990 that number was 5%, with 28% working in manufacturing and 67% in the services sector. The A1 motorway, which opened in 1970, touches south-east corner of the municipality. One road from the Mägenwil exit runs straight through the municipality. This easy access to the motorway, led to the establishment of several traffic-logistics businesses. Since 1990, the number of open jobs slightly exceeds the number of inhabitants.

== Geography ==
Brunegg has an area, as of 2009, of 1.56 square kilometers (0.60 sq mi). Of this area, 0.65 km^{2} (0.25 sq mi) or 41.7% is used for agricultural purposes, while 0.4 km^{2} (0.15 sq mi) or 25.6% is forested. Of the rest of the land, 0.46 km^{2} (0.18 sq mi) or 29.5% is settled (buildings or roads).

Of the built up area, industrial buildings made up 7.1% of the total area while housing and buildings made up 9.0% and transportation infrastructure made up 10.3%. Power and water infrastructure as well as other special developed areas made up 3.2% of the area Out of the forested land, all of the forested land area is covered with heavy forests. Of the agricultural land, 34.0% is used for growing crops and 7.1% is pastures.

The municipality is located in the Lenzburg district, on the southern edge of the Birrfeld. It consists of the Haufendorf village (an irregular, unplanned and quite closely packed village, built around a central square) of Brunegg and Brunegg Castle on a ridge of the nearby Kestenberg mountain.

== Coat of arms ==
The blazon of the municipal coat of arms is Argent a Carbuncle Azure.

== Demographics ==
Brunegg has a population (as of December 2020) of 866. As of June 2009, 15.3% of the population are foreign nationals. Over the last 10 years (1997–2007) the population has changed at a rate of 24.8%. Most of the population (as of 2000) speaks German (94.2%), with Italian being second most common ( 2.4%) and French being third ( 1.1%).

The age distribution, as of 2008, in Brunegg is; 48 children or 7.8% of the population are between 0 and 9 years old and 64 teenagers or 10.5% are between 10 and 19. Of the adult population, 101 people or 16.5% of the population are between 20 and 29 years old. 93 people or 15.2% are between 30 and 39, 120 people or 19.6% are between 40 and 49, and 87 people or 14.2% are between 50 and 59. The senior population distribution is 55 people or 9.0% of the population are between 60 and 69 years old, 24 people or 3.9% are between 70 and 79, there are 19 people or 3.1% who are between 80 and 89, and there is 1 person who is 90 or older.

As of 2000 the average number of residents per living room was 0.52 which is about equal to the cantonal average of 0.57 per room. In this case, a room is defined as space of a housing unit of at least 4 m^{2} (43 sq ft) as normal bedrooms, dining rooms, living rooms, kitchens and habitable cellars and attics. About 53.3% of the total households were owner occupied, or in other words did not pay rent (though they may have a mortgage or a rent-to-own agreement).

As of 2000, there were 19 homes with 1 or 2 persons in the household, 85 homes with 3 or 4 persons in the household, and 93 homes with 5 or more persons in the household. As of 2000, there were 200 private households (homes and apartments) in the municipality, and an average of 2.3 persons per household. In 2008 there were 110 single family homes (or 42.1% of the total) out of a total of 261 homes and apartments. There were a total of 14 empty apartments for a 5.4% vacancy rate. As of 2007, the construction rate of new housing units was 22.5 new units per 1000 residents.

In the 2007 federal election the most popular party was the SVP which received 47.4% of the vote. The next three most popular parties were the SP (13.9%), the FDP (13.1%) and the CVP (7.7%).

The entire Swiss population is generally well educated. In Brunegg about 82% of the population (between age 25 and 64) have completed either non-mandatory upper secondary education or additional higher education (either university or a Fachhochschule). Of the school age population (in the 2008/2009 school year), there are 27 students attending primary school in the municipality.

The historical population is given in the following table:

Historical population
Year	Pop.	±%
1798	180	—
1850	277	+53.9%
1870	305	+10.1%
1900	244	−20.0%
1920	224	−8.2%
1950	297	+32.6%

== Economy ==
As of 2007, Brunegg had an unemployment rate of 1.42%. As of 2005, there were 22 people employed in the primary economic sector and about 7 businesses involved in this sector. 100 people are employed in the secondary sector and there are 5 businesses in this sector. 296 people are employed in the tertiary sector, with 16 businesses in this sector.

In 2000 there were 272 workers who lived in the municipality. Of these, 210 or about 77.2% of the residents worked outside Brunegg while 378 people commuted into the municipality for work. There were a total of 440 jobs (of at least 6 hours per week) in the municipality. Of the working population, 6.5% used public transportation to get to work, and 60.3% used a private car.

== Religion ==
From the 2000 census, 111 or 23.8% were Roman Catholic, while 278 or 59.7% belonged to the Swiss Reformed Church.
