= Richensee =

Former municipality, canton of Lucerne

- Former municipality
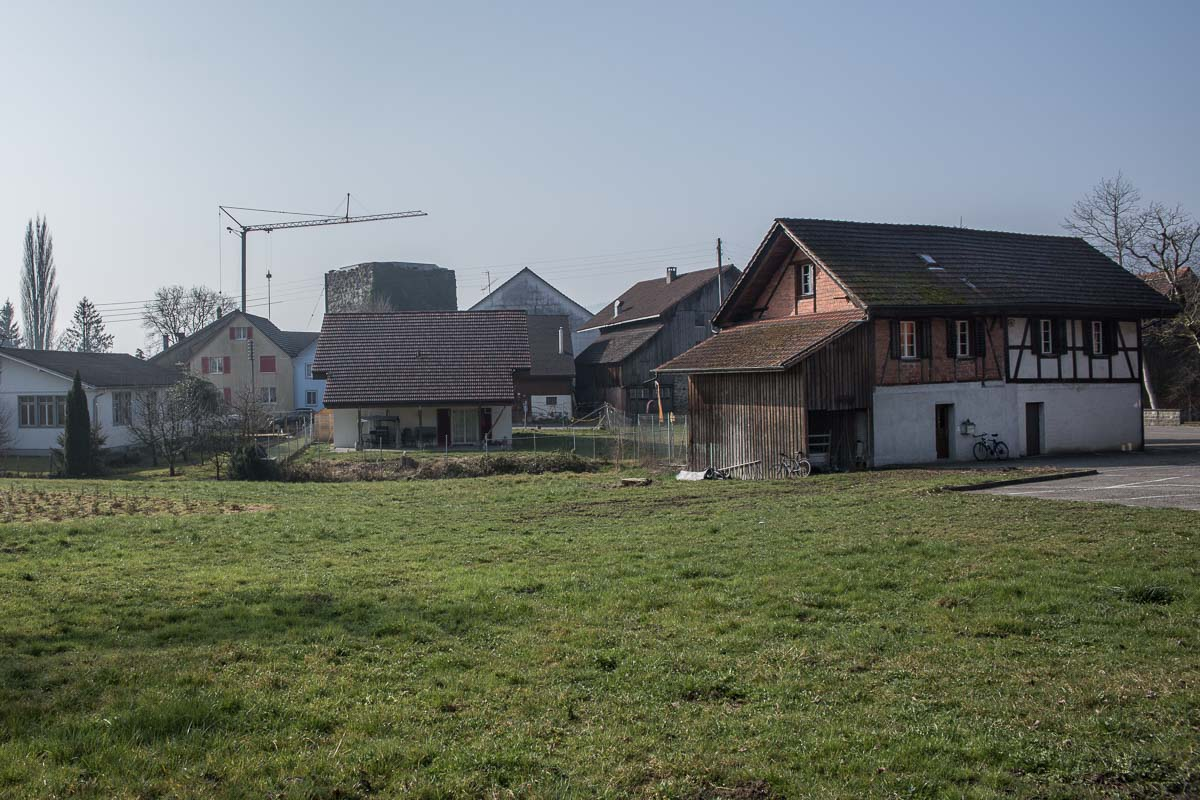
- Tower in Richensee
- Location of Richensee
- Location within Switzerland Location within Canton of Lucerne
- Coordinates: 47°13′14″N 8°15′5″E
- Country: Switzerland
- Canton: Lucerne
- District: Hochdorf
- Municipality: Hitzkirch

Population (1888)
  - Total: 127
- Time zone: UTC+01:00 (CET)
  - Summer (DST): UTC+02:00 (CEST)
- ISO 3166 code: CH-LU
- Website: Profile (in German),

Richensee is a former municipality in the Hochdorf constituency (Wahlkreis) of the canton of Lucerne, Switzerland, and a former office (Amt). Since 1897 it has been part of the municipality of Hitzkirch. It lies in the Seetal at the outflow of the Aabach from Lake Baldegg. The settlement grew up around a tower built by the counts of Kyburg between 1237 and 1243 and is mostly called a small town in the chronicles; it was destroyed in 1386, during the Sempach War.

== History ==
Richensee is first mentioned in 1255 as Richense. Between 1237 and 1243 the counts of Kyburg built a fortified residential tower north of Lake Baldegg, which was the seat of a Kyburg bailiff (Vogt) and from 1264 of a Habsburg one. The settlement of Richensee developed around the tower; the chronicles mostly call it a "small town" (Städtchen). Territorial consolidation and the expansion of the settlement led to conflicts with the chapter of Beromünster. Richensee, with its chapel of St. Lawrence and St. Gertrude, belonged to the parish of Hitzkirch.

Before 1306 the Habsburgs detached the territory of the parish from the Kyburg office (Amt) of Lenzburg and formed from it, together with the parishes of Hochdorf and Hohenrain, and before 1318 that of Schongau, the office of Richensee, which was administered by the office of Rothenburg. From the end of the 14th century until 1420 the northern part of the office was pledged to the Gessler family. After 1395 Lucerne occupied the court district (Gerichtskreis) of Hochdorf, and from 1415 to 1425 the whole office of Hochdorf. In 1425 the parish territory of Hitzkirch was assigned to the Freie Ämter as the office of Richensee. It was renamed the office of Hitzkirch in the 16th century and assigned to the district (Amt) of Hochdorf in 1803, which became a constituency in 2012.

From 1306 several annual fairs were held in Richensee, but it had no mayor (Schultheiss), council or seal. In the Sempach War of 1386 Richensee was destroyed by Austrian troops. Afterwards it appears as a village or market town (Flecken; with a burgher community in 1583) and as a market place. The nearby Grünenberg tower, which still stood as a ruin at the beginning of the 21st century, was a Habsburg fief and the seat of the lords von Lieli. After 1388 it passed to the barons of Grünenberg, and in 1437 to the lordship of Heidegg.

Richensee had several taverns and a bakery, and in the 18th century a nail smithy and a stove maker's workshop (Hafnerei). Livestock farming, the growing of cereals and fruit and, until the 20th century, some viticulture were practiced. Richensee's rights of use in the Erlosen forest led to frequent conflicts with Ermensee from about 1501 until the division of the forest in 1804. From 1887 the financially weak municipality was under the guardianship (Kuratel) of the canton of Lucerne, and in 1897 it was merged into the municipality of Hitzkirch.

Richensee had 148 inhabitants in 1665, 171 in 1850 and 127 in 1888.

== Bibliography ==
- Reinhold Bosch, "Richensee", in Zeitschrift für schweizerische Geschichte 23, 1943, pp. 52–68
- Adolf Reinle, Das Amt Hochdorf, 1963, pp. 129–134 (Die Kunstdenkmäler des Kantons Luzern, 6)
- Werner Meyer, "Burgenbau im kyburgischen Machtbereich", in Die Grafen von Kyburg. Kyburger-Tagung 1980 in Winterthur, 1981, pp. 69–85 (Schweizer Beiträge zur Kulturgeschichte und Archäologie des Mittelalters, 8)
- Bruno Häfliger, Richensee. Auf den Spuren eines vergangenen Städtchens, 1997
- Martina Stercken, Städte der Herrschaft. Kleinstadtgenese im habsburgischen Herrschaftsraum des 13. und 14. Jahrhunderts, 2006
- Fabian Küng, "'... ein leibhaftiges Märchen aus alten Zeiten.' Das mittelalterliche Richensee", in Mittelalter. Zeitschrift des Schweizerischen Burgenvereins 17, 2012, pp. 103–117
