= Gessler family =

Habsburg ministerial family in the Aargau

The Gessler family (Gessler von Meienberg und Brunegg) was a family of Habsburg ministeriales in the Aargau, mentioned from the 13th to the 15th century and originally from Wiggwil. From the early 14th century its members held high offices in the service of the dukes of Austria, and between 1359 and 1405 they built up a considerable position in the Habsburg territories south of the Rhine through pledges, fiefs and advocacies. In 1415 Lucerne and the Swiss Confederates occupied their possessions in the southern Aargau, and with Georg (died 1486), who founded a line in Ravensburg, the family disappeared from the area of present-day Switzerland. The 15th-century chroniclers gave the family's name to the haughty bailiff Gessler in the William Tell legend.

== History ==
Gessler coats of arms in the church of Kappel Abbey, where the family was buried

The first known member of the family, Ulrich (attested 1250–1279), moved in 1251 to Meienberg, the administrative center of a Habsburg office. With Johannes I (attested 1309–1315) began the rapid rise of the Gesslers, who held high offices in the service of the Austrian territorial lords. They served as ducal councillors, court officials, envoys and bailiffs (Landvögte). The most important member of the family was Heinrich III (attested from 1359 to before 1408). He was chamberlain (Kammermeister) to Duke Leopold III, a ducal councillor, and in 1386 bailiff in the Aargau, and in 1387 also in the Thurgau and the Black Forest.

Between 1359 and 1405 the Gesslers built up a considerable position in the Habsburg territories south of the Rhine by taking over pledges, fiefs and advocacies: the office of Meienberg (1359–1415), the office of Richensee (between 1370/1386 and 1415), the office of Grüningen (1374–1408), and the offices of Muri and Hermetschwil (1379–1415). At times they were also bailiffs in the Eigenamt (before 1394–1397), and they held as pledges Schenkenberg Castle and the office of Bözberg (after 1398–1407), as well as the fortress of Rheinfelden, the county of Fricktal and the office of Homberg (1403–1404). They obtained the bailiwick of Feldkirch (1398–1402/1405?) and the castle guard (Burghut) of Rapperswil (1396 and 1406), and they owned the castles of Neukrenkingen in the Klettgau (before 1354–1359) and Gutenburg (1393–1405, Baden), as well as Austrian fiefs in the Tyrol (1370–1371).

Their recorded residences were the castles of Neukrenkingen, Grüningen and Brunegg (before 1395–1440), whose name they added to their own. They intermarried with the families von Mülinen, von Ellerbach, von Küngstein (Kienberg), von Wagenberg, von Klingenberg, von Friedingen and von Freiberg. Their burial place was Kappel Abbey. When the Gesslers were drawn into the conflicts between the Habsburgs and the Swiss Confederates toward the end of the 14th century, their economic situation became precarious. In 1408 they sold the lordship of Grüningen to Zurich. In 1415 Lucerne and the Confederates occupied their possessions in the southern Aargau, and for years the Gesslers, the von Friedingen of Hohenkrähen in the Hegau, who were related to them by marriage, and the Confederates fought bitterly over these possessions. With Georg (died 1486), who settled in Ravensburg and founded a line there, the family disappeared from the area of present-day Switzerland.

As important representatives of Austria, the Gesslers incurred the particular enmity of the Confederates. Accordingly, the chroniclers of the 15th century named the haughty bailiff of the Tell legend, which arose at that time, Gessler.

== Bibliography ==
- E. L. Rochholz, Die Aargauer Gessler in Urkunden von 1250 bis 1513, 1877
- E. L. Rochholz, Tell und Gessler in Sage und Geschichte, 1877
- A. Bickel, Die Herren von Hallwil im Mittelalter, 1978, pp. 224–225
- G. P. Marchal, Sempach 1386, 1986
- P. Niederhäuser, "Adel und Habsburg – habsburgischer Adel?", in Mitteilungen der Antiquarischen Gesellschaft in Zürich 77, 2010, pp. 160–163
