= Twing =

Search engine for internet forum content

Twing.com was a search engine before the end of 2008 specializing in internet forum content, located in Jersey City, New Jersey, with data centers around the world. Twing.com used vertical searching as a forum search service that seeks out communities based on common forum formats. The product disappeared from the Web in late November, 2008, when the product division's parent company Accoona ceased business operations.

Twing.com did not use the typical web crawler method but recognizes the footprint and structure of forum content and indexes such content according to its context, and then allows for word sense disambiguation of concepts through use of topical category and other filters.

Additionally, prior to ceasing operations, Twing.com began collecting and indexing content from Twitter and other real-time user generated content sources.

== Content disambiguation ==
To allow for disambiguation, Twing.com is utilizing interface concepts such as Faceted Search and Filtering in the Search Engine Result Pages, (SERPs). These are advanced search methods that attempt to assist users with their information foraging efforts by keeping them on an information scent trail.

Category filters, based on the directory taxonomy, are one of the filtering methods available. This is an attempt to solve the generalized search problem of ambiguity that often occurs in search results as well as forum search results. A good example might be the word "bass." If you do a search for bass on Wikipedia, you get a disambiguation page to determine if the phrase in this case means a musical instrument, a company name, part of a place name, a beverage, and other options. While adding key terms to a search may sometimes collapse ambiguities, doing so can also exclude things of value. So category filters can help solve the problem of ambiguity in search engine results, whether such search engines are forum search specific or not. Additional filters are available based on language entity extraction from content and proprietary algorithms and dictionaries. Twing.com's use of such technology is discernible from seeing the filters available within the search results pages.

== Forum content collection ==
The Twing.com robot, (called Twingbot), was designed to understand the formats of Internet Forums, (a.k.a. Bulletin Boards or Discussion Groups.) While the Twing.com product was open to the world in January, 2008, the Twingbot robot had been observed 'in the wild' at least several months earlier. (The Twingbot robot had identified itself as User-Agent: Twingbot/1.0 and formerly had its own descriptive web page at www.twingbot.com/)

== See also ==
- Internet forum
- Web search engine
- Vertical search
- List of search engines
- Word sense disambiguation
