= Meierskappel =

- Municipality
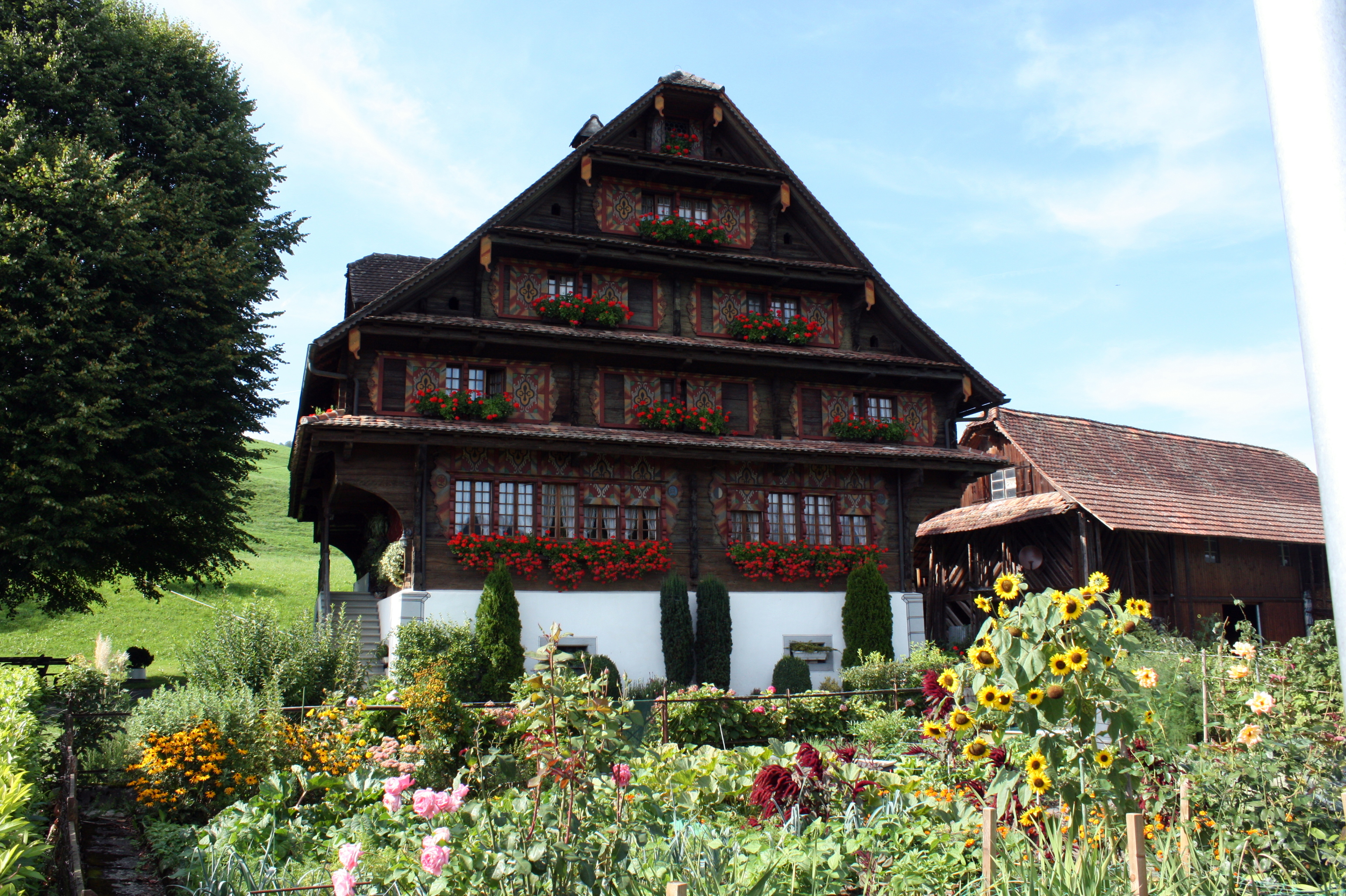

- Coat of arms
- Location of Meierskappel
- Location within Switzerland Location within Canton of Lucerne
- Coordinates: 47°8′N 8°27′E
- Country: Switzerland
- Canton: Lucerne
- District: Lucerne-Land

Government
  - Mayor: Konrad Langenegger (as of 2019)

Area
  - Total: 9.23 km^{2} (3.56 sq mi)
- Elevation: 497 m (1,631 ft)

Population (December 2020)
  - Total: 1,477
  - Density: 160/km^{2} (414/sq mi)
- Time zone: UTC+01:00 (CET)
  - Summer (DST): UTC+02:00 (CEST)
- Postal code: 6344
- SFOS number: 1064
- ISO 3166 code: CH-LU
- Surrounded by: Küssnacht (SZ), Risch (ZG), Root, Udligenswil, Walchwil (ZG), Zug (ZG)
- Website: www.meierskappel.ch

Meierskappel is a municipality in the district of Lucerne-Land in the canton of Lucerne in Switzerland.

== History ==
Meierskappel is first mentioned in 1160 as Cappell.

== Geography ==
Meierskappel has an area of 6.8 km^{2} (2.6 sq mi). Of this area, 66.1% is used for agricultural purposes, while 25.2% is forested. The rest of the land, (8.7%) is settled. In the 1997 land survey, 25.19% of the total land area was forested. Of the agricultural land, 60.15% is used for farming or pastures, while 5.93% is used for orchards or vine crops. Of the settled areas, 5.78% is covered with buildings, 0.74% is industrial, 0.15% is classed as special developments, 0.15% is parks or greenbelts and 1.93% is transportation infrastructure.

The municipality is located on the south east slope of the Rooterberg mountain and stretches to Lake Zug.

== Demographics ==
Meierskappel has a population (as of 31 December 2020) of 1,477. As of 2007, 12.5% of the population was made up of foreign nationals. Over the last 10 years the population has grown at a rate of 19.3%. Most of the population (as of 2000) speaks German (94.4%), with English being second most common ( 1.0%) and Dutch being third ( 0.5%).

In the 2007 election the most popular party was the SVP which received 46.3% of the vote. The next three most popular parties were the CVP (18.9%), the FDP (17.1%) and the Green Party (9.2%).

The age distribution in Meierskappel is; 308 people or 25.3% of the population is 0–19 years old. 333 people or 27.4% are 20–39 years old, and 430 people or 35.4% are 40–64 years old. The senior population distribution is 112 people or 9.2% are 65–79 years old, 27 or 2.2% are 80–89 years old and 5 people or 0.4% of the population are 90+ years old.

In Meierskappel about 78.1% of the population (between age 25-64) have completed either non-mandatory upper secondary education or additional higher education (either university or a Fachhochschule).

As of 2000 there are 385 households, of which 101 households (or about 26.2%) contain only a single individual. 43 or about 11.2% are large households, with at least five members. As of 2000 there were 246 inhabited buildings in the municipality, of which 190 were built only as housing, and 56 were mixed use buildings. There were 127 single family homes, 40 double family homes, and 23 multi-family homes in the municipality. Most homes were either two (94) or three (73) story structures. There were only 11 single story buildings and 12 four or more story buildings.

Meierskappel has an unemployment rate of 2.19%. As of 2005, there were 102 people employed in the primary economic sector and about 32 businesses involved in this sector. 154 people are employed in the secondary sector and there are 19 businesses in this sector. 81 people are employed in the tertiary sector, with 27 businesses in this sector. As of 2000 56.8% of the population of the municipality were employed in some capacity. At the same time, females made up 42.7% of the workforce.

In the 2000 census the religious membership of Meierskappel was; 670 (65.8%) were Roman Catholic, and 180 (17.7%) were Protestant, with an additional 29 (2.85%) that were of some other Christian faith. There are 17 individuals (1.67% of the population) who are Muslim. Of the rest; there were 3 (0.29%) individuals who belong to another religion, 92 (9.03%) who do not belong to any organized religion, 28 (2.75%) who did not answer the question.

The historical population is given in the following table:

year	population
1456	c100
1695	c33
1798	379
1850	535
1880	626
1900	488
1950	609
2000	1,019
