= Buttisholz Castle =

Castle in Buttisholz, Switzerland

Coordinates: 47°06′54″N 8°05′49″E

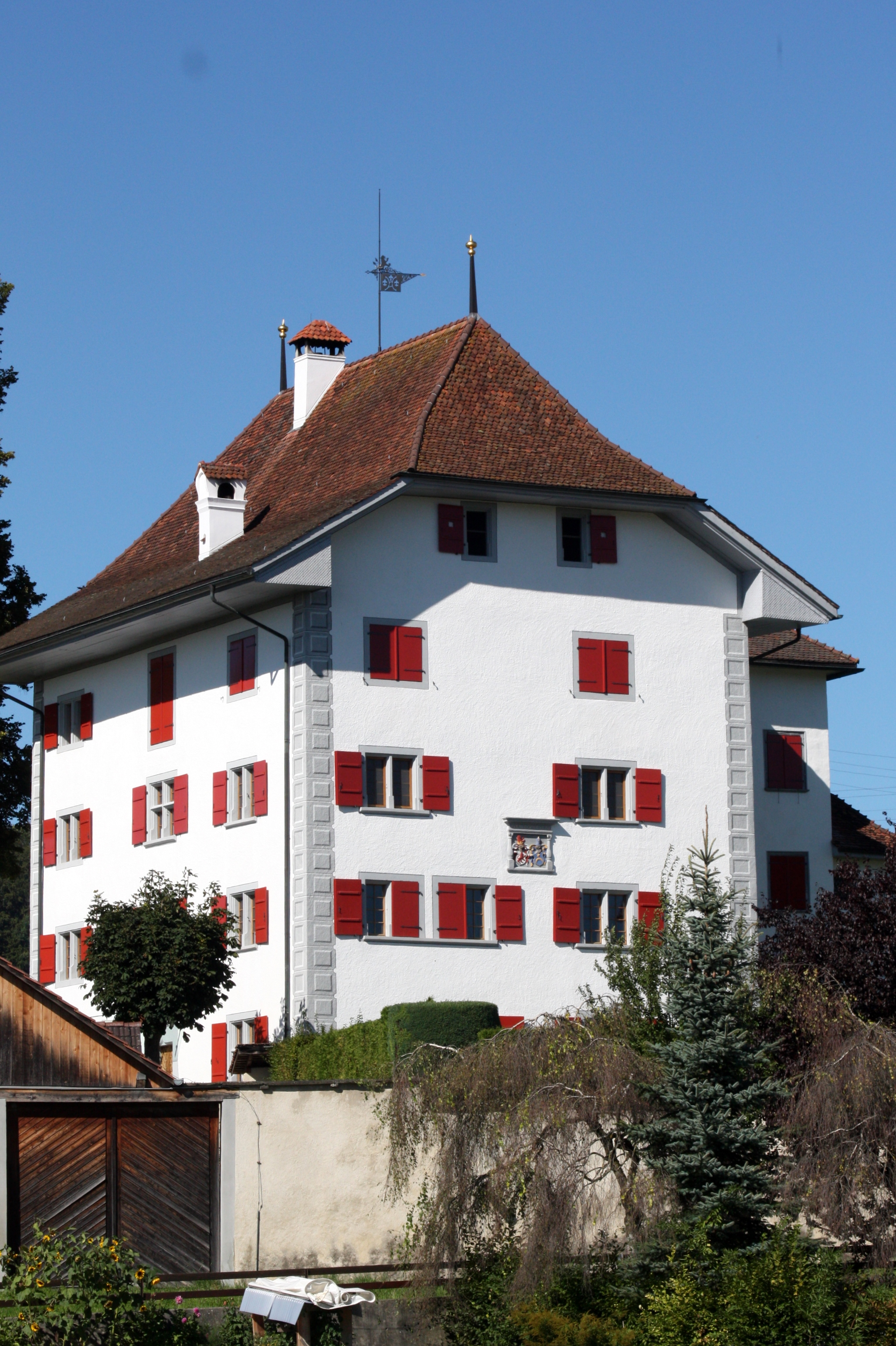
Buttisholz Castle

Buttisholz Castle is a castle in the municipality of Buttisholz of the Canton of Lucerne in Switzerland. It is a Swiss heritage site of national significance.

== See also ==
- List of castles in Switzerland
