= Brunegg Castle =

Castle in Brunegg, Switzerland

- Brunegg
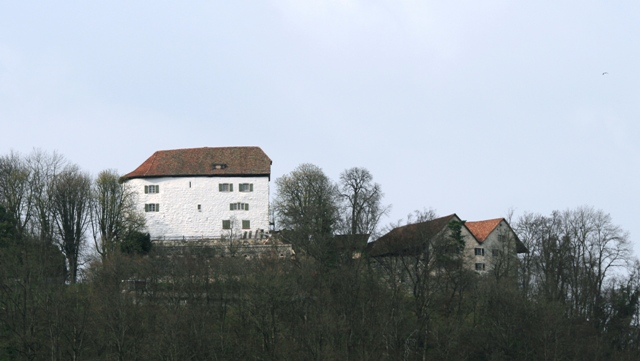
- Brunegg Castle

Site information
- Code: CH-AG
- Condition: preserved

Location
- Location within Switzerland
- Coordinates: 47°25′19.78″N 8°12′52.16″E
- Height: 543 m above the sea

Site history
- Built: 13th century

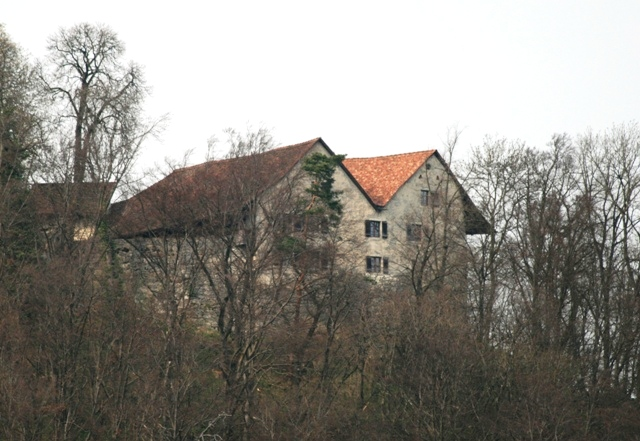
Castle Brunegg

Brunegg castle (German: Schloss Brunegg) is a castle in the municipality of Brunegg in the canton of Aargau in Switzerland.

The castle was built on a hill at the edge of the Jura Mountains in the 13th century. This castle was probably built, together with Wildegg castle in nearby Wildegg, as part of the Habsburg border defenses. The castle was occupied by Habsburg knights, including Schenken von Brunegg and Gessler von Meienberg. In 1415 the castle was besieged by Bernese troops, but they lifted the siege after a counterattack. However, Bern conquered the Aargau, and awarded the fief to the Segenser or Segesser family. Between 1538 and 1798, the castle was subordinate to the governor of Lenzburg. In 1815 it became the property of the Hünerwadel family of Lenzburg. The current owners of the castle, the von Salis family, inherited the castle through marriage from the Hünerwadels. For hundreds of years, the castle was poorly maintained, and in the 17th century it was heavily damaged twice through storm and tempest. In 1805–06, the keep and out buildings were repaired and the roof was rebuilt.

The village of Brunegg owes its name and existence to the castle. Initially it belonged to the personal land of the Habsburgs. In the 14th century, they granted the rights to low justice into the hands of the castle owners. Bern placed in the court of Othmarsingen in the Lenzburg district. In the 19th century it was part of the Brugg district though since 1840 it has been in the Lenzburg district.

== See also ==
- List of castles and fortresses in Switzerland
