= Udligenswil =

- Municipality
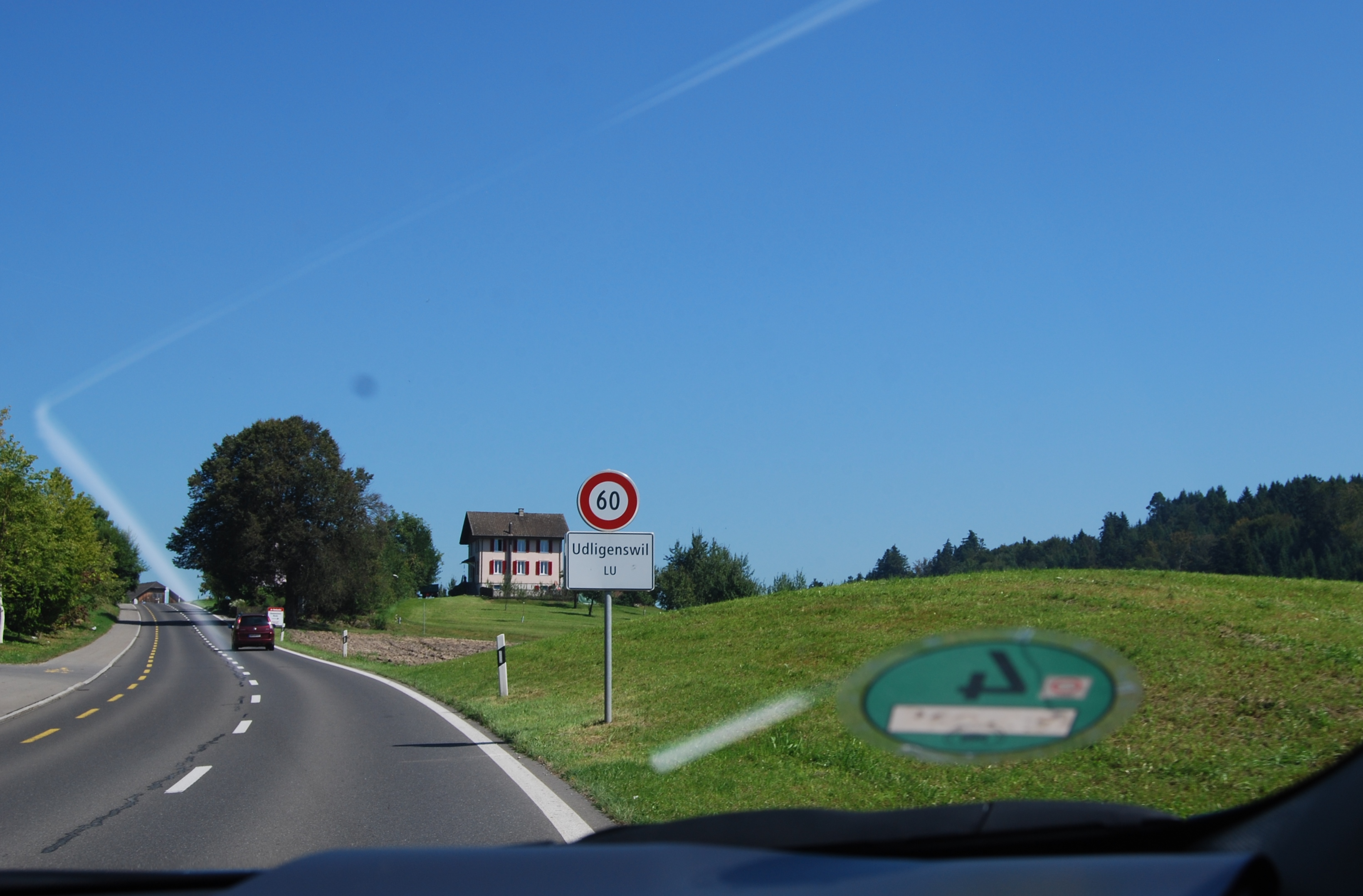

- Flag Coat of arms
- Location of Udligenswil
- Location within Switzerland Location within Canton of Lucerne
- Coordinates: 47°5′N 8°24′E
- Country: Switzerland
- Canton: Lucerne
- District: Lucerne

Government
  - Mayor: Thomas Rebsamen (as of 2019)

Area
  - Total: 6.25 km^{2} (2.41 sq mi)
- Elevation: 621 m (2,037 ft)

Population (December 2020)
  - Total: 2,371
  - Density: 379/km^{2} (983/sq mi)
- Time zone: UTC+01:00 (CET)
  - Summer (DST): UTC+02:00 (CEST)
- Postal code: 6044
- SFOS number: 1067
- ISO 3166 code: CH-LU
- Surrounded by: Adligenswil, Dierikon, Küssnacht (SZ), Meierskappel, Root
- Website: www.udligenswil.ch

Udligenswil is a municipality in the district of Lucerne in the canton of Lucerne in Switzerland.

== Geography ==
Aerial view (1970)

Udligenswil has an area of 6.3 km^{2} (2.4 sq mi). Of this area, 66.7% is used for agricultural purposes, while 22.7% is forested. Of the rest of the land, 9.9% is settled (buildings or roads) and the remainder (0.6%) is non-productive (rivers, glaciers or mountains). In the 1997 land survey, 22.72% of the total land area was forested. Of the agricultural land, 60.96% is used for farming or pastures, while 5.76% is used for orchards or vine crops. Of the settled areas, 5.76% is covered with buildings, 0.48% is industrial, 0.64% is classed as special developments, and 3.04% is transportation infrastructure.

== Demographics ==
Udligenswil has a population (as of 31 December 2020) of 2,371. As of 2007, 8.3% of the population was made up of foreign nationals. Over the last 10 years the population has grown at a rate of 12.3%. Most of the population (as of 2000) speaks German (94.8%), with Albanian being second most common (1.3%) and Serbo-Croatian being third (1.0%).

The following chart presents historical population of the municipality:

In the 2007 election the most popular party was the FDP which received 27.5% of the vote. The next three most popular parties were the SVP (26%), the CVP (23.3%) and the Green Party (11.3%).

The age distribution in Udligenswil is; 542 people or 25.6% of the population is 0–19 years old. 494 people or 23.3% are 20–39 years old, and 812 people or 38.3% are 40–64 years old. The senior population distribution is 225 people or 10.6% are 65–79 years old, 40 or 1.9% are 80–89 years old and 5 people or 0.2% of the population are 90+ years old. In Udligenswil about 79.1% of the population (between age 25-64) have completed either non-mandatory upper secondary education or additional higher education (either university or a Fachhochschule). As of 2000 there are 663 households, of which 135 households (or about 20.4%) contain only a single individual. 76 or about 11.5% are large households, with at least five members. As of 2000 there were 426 inhabited buildings in the municipality, of which 364 were built only as housing, and 62 were mixed use buildings. There were 285 single family homes, 45 double family homes, and 34 multi-family homes in the municipality. Most homes were either two (210) or three (102) story structures. There were only 36 single story buildings and 16 four or more story buildings.

Udligenswil has an unemployment rate of 1.19%. As of 2005, there were 92 people employed in the primary economic sector and about 33 businesses involved in this sector. 65 people are employed in the secondary sector and there are 16 businesses in this sector. 126 people are employed in the tertiary sector, with 46 businesses in this sector. As of 2000 54.8% of the population of the municipality were employed in some capacity. At the same time, females made up 41.4% of the workforce.

In the 2000 census the religious membership of Udligenswil was; 1,306 (70.6%) were Roman Catholic, and 276 (14.9%) were Protestant, with an additional 36 (1.94%) that were of some other Christian faith. There are 1 individuals (0.05% of the population) who are Jewish. There are 34 individuals (1.84% of the population) who are Muslim. Of the rest; there were 5 (0.27%) individuals who belong to another religion, 136 (7.35%) who do not belong to any organized religion, 57 (3.08%) who did not answer the question.
