= Adligenswil =

- Municipality
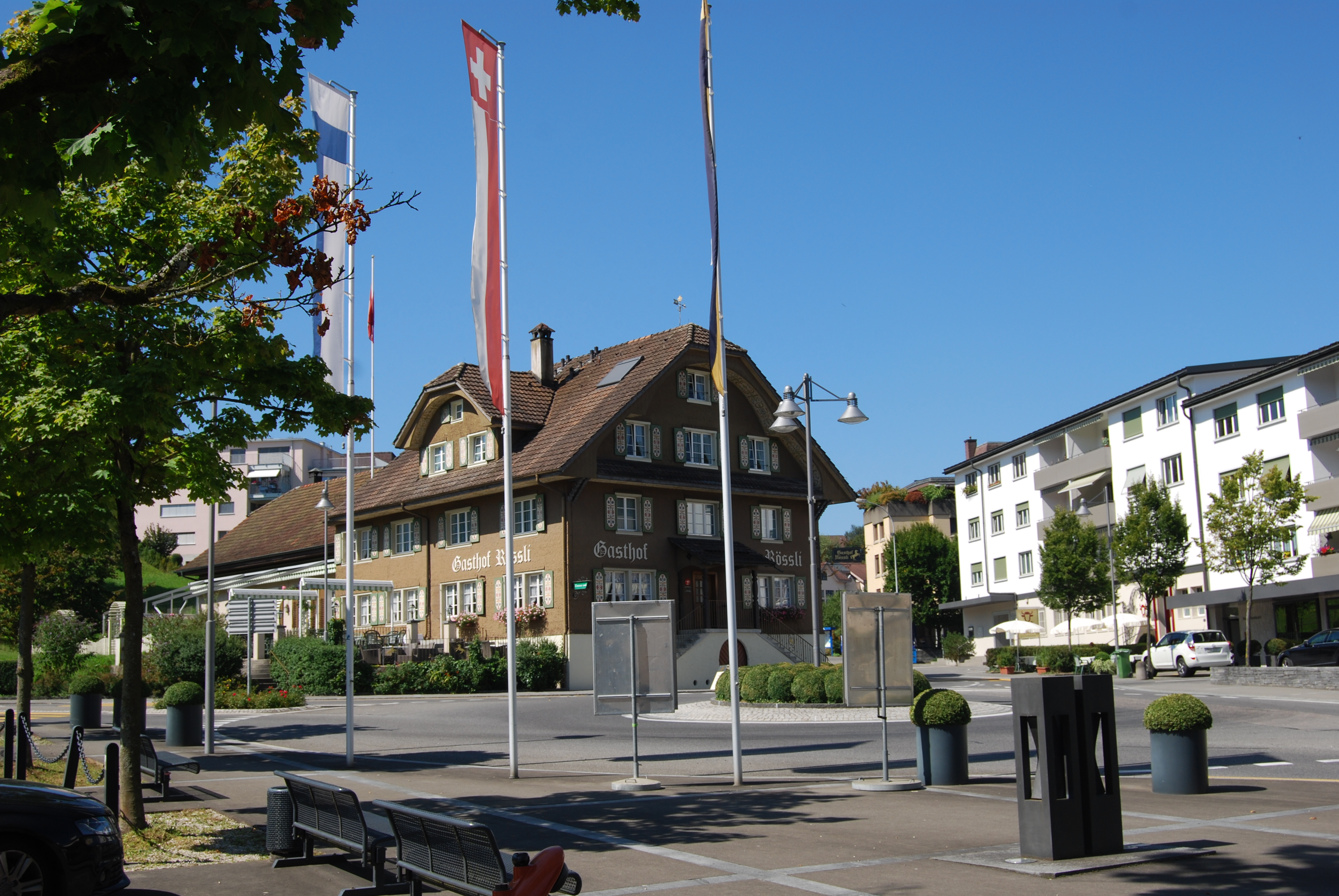

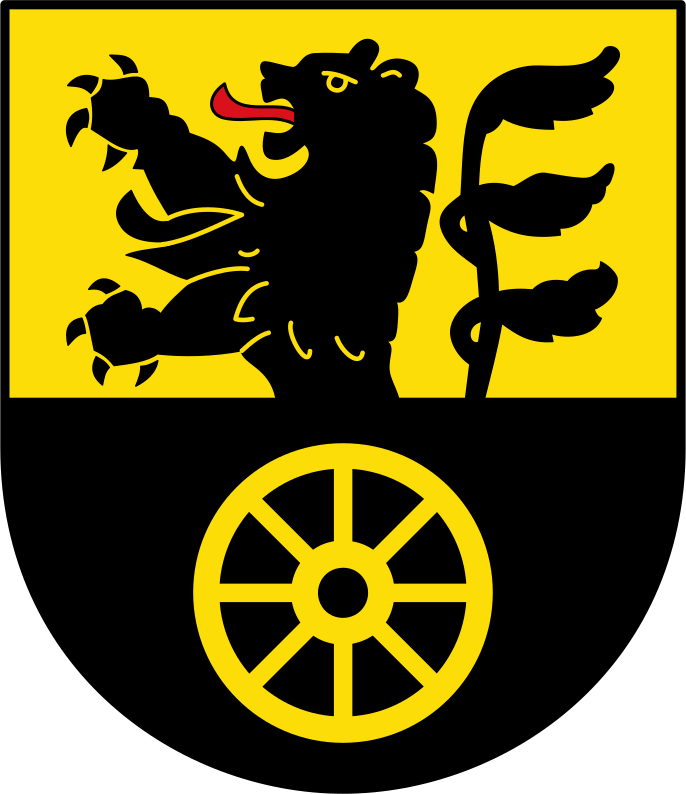
- Coat of arms
- Location of Adligenswil
- Location within Switzerland Location within Canton of Lucerne
- Coordinates: 47°04′14″N 08°21′54″E
- Country: Switzerland
- Canton: Lucerne
- District: Lucerne

Government
  - Mayor: Ursi Burkart-Merz CVP/PDC (as of 2019)

Area
  - Total: 6.99 km^{2} (2.70 sq mi)
- Elevation: 532 m (1,745 ft)

Population (December 2020)
  - Total: 5,471
  - Density: 783/km^{2} (2,030/sq mi)
- Time zone: UTC+01:00 (CET)
  - Summer (DST): UTC+02:00 (CEST)
- Postal code: 6043
- SFOS number: 1051
- ISO 3166 code: CH-LU
- Surrounded by: Dierikon, Ebikon, Küssnacht (SZ), Lucerne, Meggen, Udligenswil
- Website: www.adligenswil.ch

Adligenswil is a municipality in Lucerne District in the Canton of Lucerne in Switzerland. It is east of the city of Lucerne and borders on the canton of Schwyz.

== Geography ==
Adligenswil is a spread out community on the north side of the valley of the Würzenbach river. 3 kilometers (1.9 mi) to the south-west, the Würzenbach flows into Lake Luzerne. The western part of the municipality is drained into the Ron valley. The main settlement, Adligenswil is located in a depression between Mount Dietschiberg and Mount Dottenberg, Stuben is on the western border of the municipality, and Dottenberg is on the slope of the hill of the same name.

Adligenswil has an area of 7 km^{2} (2.7 sq mi). Of this area, 54.5% is used for agricultural purposes, while 24.3% is forested. Of the rest of the land, 19.5% is settled (buildings or roads) and the remainder (1.7%) is non-productive (rivers, glaciers or mountains). In the 1997 land survey, 24.32% of the total land area was forested. Of the agricultural land, 51.65% is used for farming or pastures, while 2.86% is used for orchards or vine crops. Of the settled areas, 11.87% is covered with buildings, 1.14% is industrial, 1.14% is classed as special developments, 2% is parks or greenbelts and 3.29% is transportation infrastructure. Of the unproductive areas, 0.14% is unproductive standing water (ponds or lakes), 0.29% is unproductive flowing water (rivers) and 1.29% is other unproductive land.

The neighboring municipalities are Dierikon to the north, Udligenswil to the north-east, Küssnacht to the east, Meggen to the south, Lucerne in the south-west and Ebikon in the north-west.

== History ==
The community was first mentioned in 1210 by its historic name Adalgeswile. Until the 13th century, Adligenswil, as well as all the area nearest to Lucerne, was under the control of Lucerne and the Alsatian Murbach Abbey. In 1291, Lucerne fell to the Habsburgs. Between the Battle of Morgarten (1315) and the Battle of Sempach (1386), the Habsburg influence gradually declined. In 1406, Lucerne acquired control of the "Vogtei" of the Habsburgs, to which Adligenswil belonged. Adligenswil was made its own parish in 1861.

== Population ==
Adligenswil has a population (as of 31 December 2020) of 5,471. As of 2007, 8.6% of the population was made up of foreign nationals. Over the last 10 years the population has grown at a rate of 19.4%. Most of the population (as of 2000) speaks German (93.6%), with French being second most common ( 0.9%) and Italian being third ( 0.9%).

Until long into the 20th century, Adligenswil retained an exclusively Roman Catholic population. As of the 2000 census the religious membership of Adligenswil was; 3,221 (64.3%) were Roman Catholic, and 1,001 (20.%) were Protestant, with an additional 45 (0.9%) that were of some other Christian faith. There are 91 individuals (1.82% of the population) who are Muslim. Of the rest; there were 38 (0.76%) individuals who belong to another religion, 484 (9.66%) who do not belong to any organized religion, 130 (2.59%) who did not answer the question.

=== Historical population ===
From 1798 until 1970, the population increased only slowly, from 433 to 953 inhabitants, so Adligenswil retained the character of a peasant village. Beginning in the 1970s, construction began, and has grown ever faster since 1975.

The historical population is given in the following table:

Year	Population
1695	252
1798	433
1850	608
1888	540
1900	575
1950	712
2000	5,010

== Politics ==
For a long time three of the five seats on the municipal council have been held by women. In the 2023 election of the cantonal council the local parties had the following shares: SVP 23,36%, SPS (including JUSO) 20,12%, FDP 16,49%, CVP (including Junge Mitte) 15,90%, glp (with JGLP) 11,22 % and the Green Party (including JG and GrüneUnt) 12,64 % and EVP 0,28 %.

The current membership of the town council is:

- Markus Gabriel (SVP): Gemeindepräsident
- Bruno Schütz (FDP): Finanzvorsteher
- Gisela Widmer Reichlin (SPS): Bauvorsteherin
- Ferdinand Huber (SVP): Sozialvorsteher
- Felicitas Marbach-Lang (Die Mitte): Bildungsvorsteherin

== Economy ==
The proportion of the employed citizens working in agriculture has dropped sharply in the last decade. The biggest employers are the printing company Ringier and the market research institute DemoScope, which is now closed.

Adligenswil has an unemployment rate of 1.56%. As of 2005, there were 89 people employed in the primary economic sector and about 26 businesses involved in this sector. 646 people are employed in the secondary sector and there are 44 businesses in this sector. 608 people are employed in the tertiary sector, with 133 businesses in this sector. As of 2000 54.5% of the population of the municipality were employed in some capacity. At the same time, females made up 43.6% of the workforce.

Despite this the commuter balance is still negative, with 1,933 locals who commute from Adligenswil (51.8% to Lucerne) and only 897 (mostly from neighboring municipalities) who commute to Adligenswil.

== Demographics ==
The age distribution in Adligenswil is: 1,392 people or 25.4% of the population is 0–19 years old. 1,256 people or 23% are 20–39 years old, and 2,191 people or 40% are 40–64 years old. The senior population distribution is 533 people or 9.7% are 65–79 years old, 86 or 1.6% are 80–89 years old and 14 people or 0.3% of the population are 90+ years old.

In Adligenswil, about 86.1% of the population (between age 25–64) have completed either non-mandatory upper secondary education or additional higher education (either university or a Fachhochschule).

As of 2000, there are 1,783 households, of which 358 households (or about 20.1%) contain only a single individual. 203 or about 11.4% are large households, with at least five members. As of 2000 there were 1,021 inhabited buildings in the municipality, of which 929 were built only as housing, and 92 were mixed use buildings. There were 750 single family homes, 72 double family homes, and 107 multi-family homes in the municipality. Most homes were either two (462) or three (347) story structures. There were only 45 single story buildings and 75 four or more story buildings.

== People ==
- Stephan Lichtsteiner, footballer
- Regula Mühlemann, sopranist
- Ruben Vargas, footballer
