= Nünegg Castle =

Castle in Hohenrain, Switzerland

Coordinates: 47°12′32″N 8°18′14″E

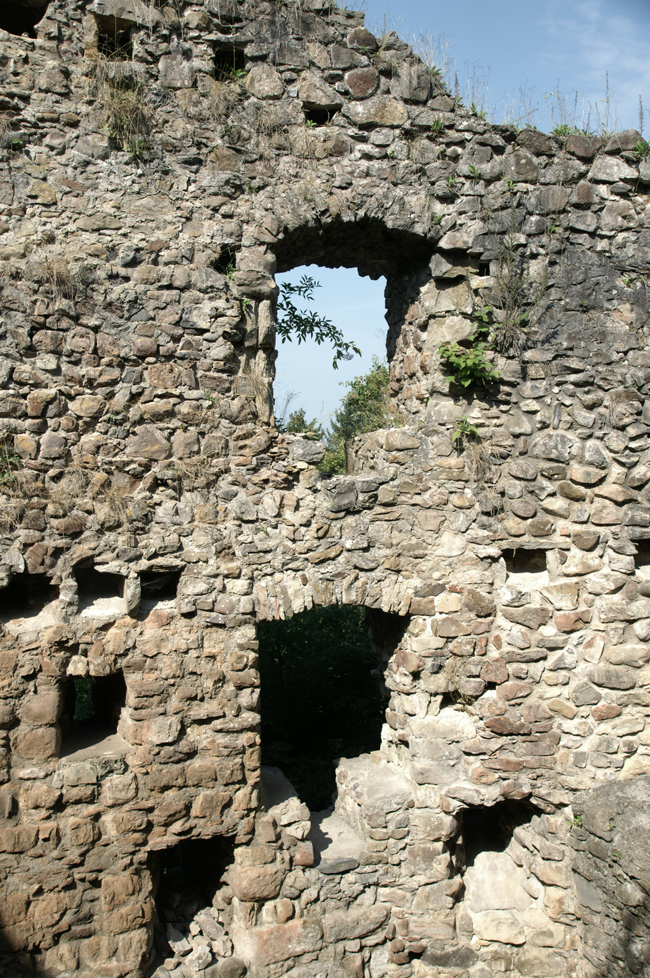
Nünegg Castle

Nünegg Castle is a ruined castle in the municipality of Hohenrain of the Canton of Lucerne in Switzerland. It is a Swiss heritage site of national significance.

== See also ==
- List of castles in Switzerland
