= Heidegg Castle =

Castle in Hitzkirch, Switzerland

- Gelfingen village, Hitzkirch
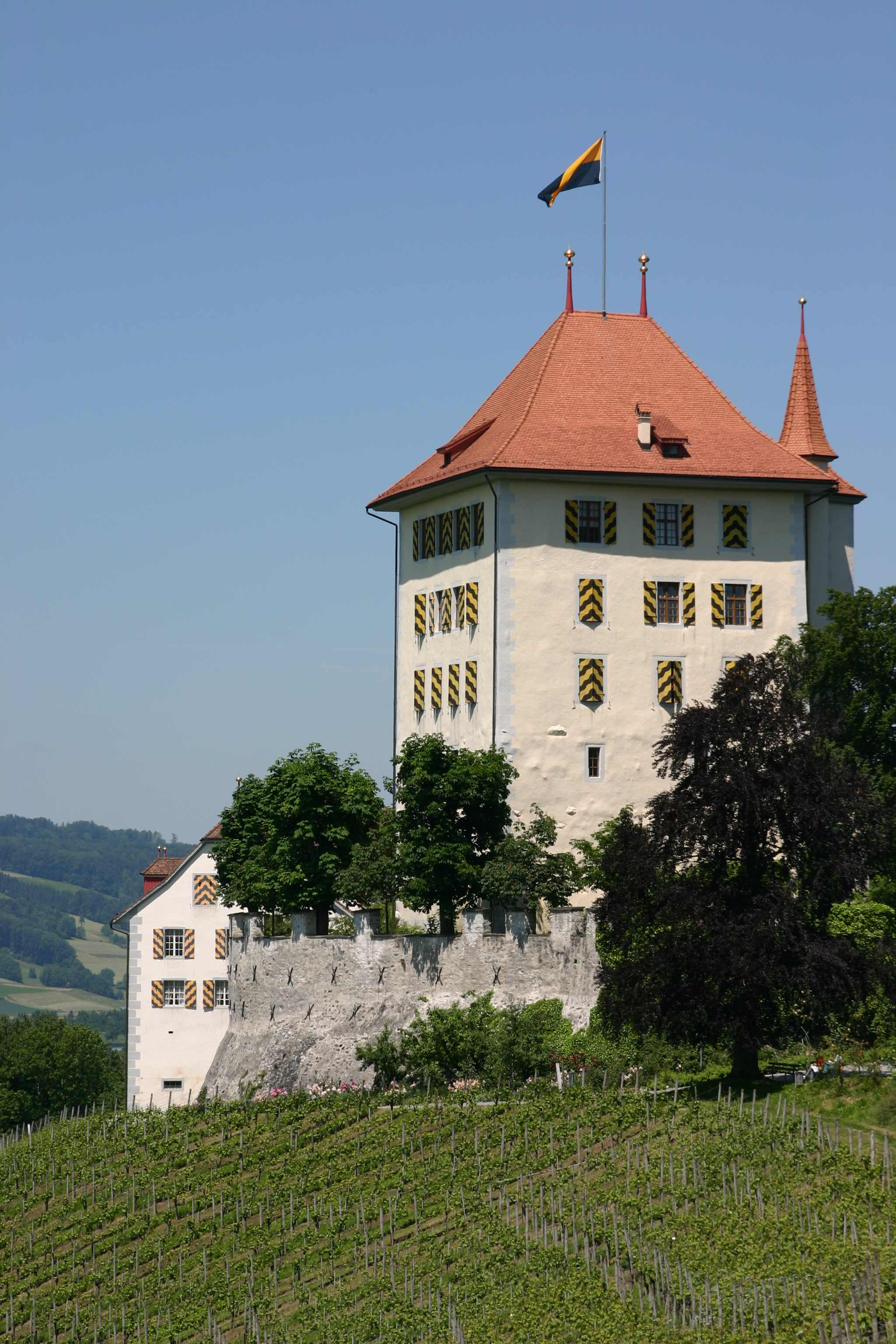
- Heidegg Castle

Site information
- Code: CH-LU

Location
- Coordinates: 47°13′0.33″N 8°16′22.92″E
- Height: 556 m above the sea

Site history
- Built: 12th-13th century

Garrison information
- Occupants: Home of Lords of Heidegg, then of Lucerne patricians, today museum

Heidegg Castle is a castle in the municipality of Hitzkirch of the Canton of Lucerne in Switzerland. It is a Swiss heritage site of national significance.

== See also ==
- List of castles in Switzerland
