= Dierikon =

- Municipality
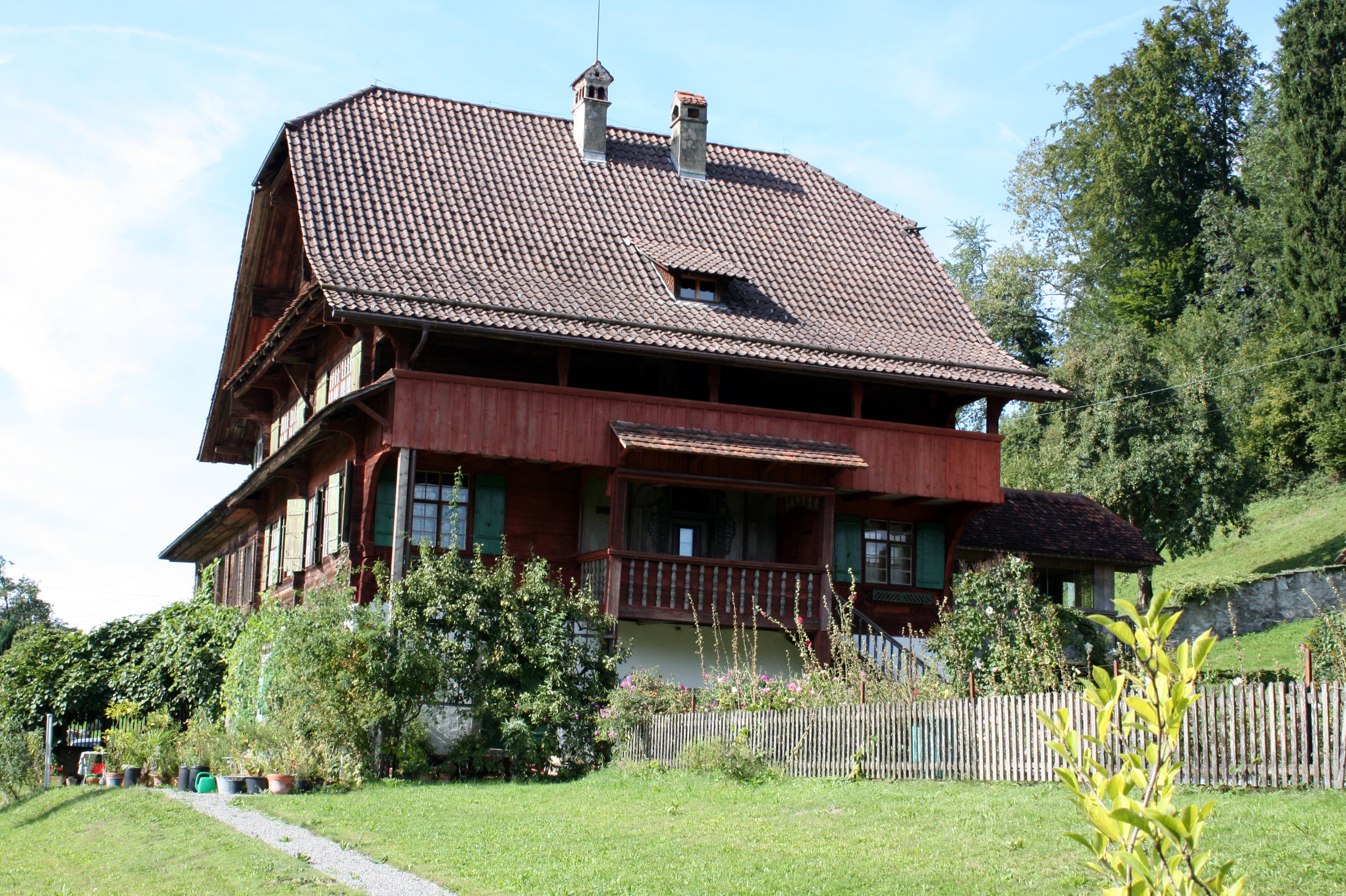

- Flag Coat of arms
- Location of Dierikon
- Location within Switzerland Location within Canton of Lucerne
- Coordinates: 47°6′N 8°22′E
- Country: Switzerland
- Canton: Lucerne
- District: Lucerne

Area
  - Total: 2.78 km^{2} (1.07 sq mi)
- Elevation: 432 m (1,417 ft)

Population (December 2020)
  - Total: 1,579
  - Density: 568/km^{2} (1,470/sq mi)
- Time zone: UTC+01:00 (CET)
  - Summer (DST): UTC+02:00 (CEST)
- Postal code: 6036
- SFOS number: 1053
- ISO 3166 code: CH-LU
- Surrounded by: Adligenswil, Buchrain, Ebikon, Root, Udligenswil
- Website: www.dierikon.ch

Dierikon is a municipality in the district of Lucerne in the canton of Lucerne, Switzerland.

== History ==
Dierikon is first mentioned around 1270-80 as Dierinkon.

== Geography ==
Dierikon has an area of, As of 2018, 2.78 km^{2} (1.07 sq mi). Of this area, 57.2% is used for agricultural purposes, while 22.3% is forested. Of the rest of the land, 18.7% is settled (buildings or roads) and the remainder (1.8%) is non-productive (rivers, glaciers or mountains). In the 1997 land survey, 22.34% of the total land area was forested. As of 2009, of the agricultural land, 54.96% is used for farming or pastures, while 4.26% is used for orchards or vine crops. Of the settled areas, 6.03% is covered with buildings, 3.9% is industrial, 1.42% is classed as special developments, 1.06% is parks or greenbelts and 4.96% is transportation infrastructure. Of the unproductive areas, the entire area is unproductive flowing water (rivers).

The municipality is located in the Ron valley along the road between Lucerne and Cham.

== Demographics ==
Dierikon has a population (as of 31 December 2020) of 1,579. As of 2007, 13.6% of the population was made up of foreign nationals. Over the last 10 years the population has grown at a rate of 1.6%. Most of the population (as of 2000) speaks German (90.8%), with Serbo-Croatian being second most common ( 2.7%) and Albanian being third ( 1.3%).

In the 2007 election the most popular party was the SVP which received 30.6% of the vote. The next three most popular parties were the CVP (29.6%), the FDP (16.1%) and the SPS (11.1%).

The age distribution in Dierikon is; 317 people or 23.1% of the population is 0–19 years old. 427 people or 31.1% are 20–39 years old, and 519 people or 37.9% are 40–64 years old. The senior population distribution is 84 people or 6.1% are 65–79 years old, 21 or 1.5% are 80–89 years old and 3 people or 0.2% of the population are 90+ years old.

The entire Swiss population is generally well educated. In Dierikon about 76.6% of the population (between age 25-64) have completed either non-mandatory upper secondary education or additional higher education (either university or a Fachhochschule).

As of 2000 there are 482 households, of which 125 households (or about 25.9%) contain only a single individual. 42 or about 8.7% are large households, with at least five members. As of 2000 there were 167 inhabited buildings in the municipality, of which 138 were built only as housing, and 29 were mixed use buildings. There were 83 single family homes, 17 double family homes, and 38 multi-family homes in the municipality. Most homes were either two (62) or three (40) story structures. There were only 4 single story buildings and 32 four or more story buildings.

Dierikon has an unemployment rate of 1.62%. As of 2005, there were 39 people employed in the primary economic sector and about 12 businesses involved in this sector. 535 people are employed in the secondary sector and there are 17 businesses in this sector. 985 people are employed in the tertiary sector, with 39 businesses in this sector. As of 2000 54.8% of the population of the municipality were employed in some capacity. At the same time, females made up 40.9% of the workforce.

In the 2000 census the religious membership of Dierikon was; 900 (70.4%) were Roman Catholic, and 168 (13.1%) were Protestant, with an additional 25 (1.95%) that were of some other Christian faith. There are 54 individuals (4.22% of the population) who are Muslim. Of the rest; there were 7 (0.55%) individuals who belong to another religion, 91 (7.11%) who do not belong to any organized religion, 34 (2.66%) who did not answer the question.

The historical population is given in the following table:

year	population
about 1456	c. 50
about 1695	c. 170
1798	194
1816	366
1850	304
1900	304
1950	359
1970	387
2000	1,279
