= Payne (surname) =

Origin
- Origin: France

Other names
- Variant forms: Pain, Paine,Paines Pane, Pagan

The English family name Payne originates in France as a variation of the name Payen (Payen; Payens or Payns). The name was brought to the British Isles as a result of the Norman Conquest of England, and is now common in English-speaking countries. Hugues de Payens from the town of Payns near Troyes moved to London in 1128 to set up a house for the Knights Templar in England.

== People surnamed Payne ==
=== A ===
- Aaron Payne (born 1982), Australian rugby league footballer
- Adreian Payne (1991–2022), American basketball player
- Alexander Payne (born 1961), American film director and screenwriter
- Anthony Payne (1936–2021), English composer, critic and musicologist
- A. R. Payne, British rubber scientist and namesake of the Payne effect

=== B ===
- Basil Payne (1923–2012), Irish poet and writer
- Ben Iden Payne (1881–1976), English actor and director
- Bert Payne (1909–1998), American curler
- Bill Payne, American pianist
- Billy Payne, American advocate and golf administrator
- Britton Payne, American curler
- Bruce Payne (born 1958), British actor
- Buckner H. Payne (1799–1889), American clergyman, publisher and racist pamphleteer.
- Bruce Ryburn Payne (1874–1937), American educator; founding president of Peabody College (now part of Vanderbilt University) from 1911 to 1937

=== C ===
- Cameron Payne (born 1994), American basketball player
- Candie Payne, English singer-songwriter
- Carl Anthony Payne II (born 1969), American actor best known for playing Cole Brown on the FOX series Martin
- C. D. Payne (C. Douglas Payne), U.S. novelist
- Cecil Payne, American saxophonist
- Cecilia Payne-Gaposchkin (1900–1979), British-American astronomer
- C. F. Payne (Chris Fox Payne, born 1954), American illustrator
- Charlotte Payne (born 2002), British hammer thrower
- Chrisette Michele Payne, better known under her stage name Chrisette Michele (born 1982), American singer and songwriter
- Craig Payne boxer
- Cynthia Payne (1932–2015), British madam

=== D ===
- Dale Payne (1917–2008), American politician from Nebraska
- Damon Payne (born 2003), American football player
- Dan Payne (born 1972), Canadian actor
- Daniel Payne (1811–1893), American bishop, educator, college administrator and author
- Daron Payne (born 1997), American football player
- David Payne (disambiguation), several people
- Davy Payne (c. 1949–2003), Northern Irish loyalist
- Déron Payne (born 2002), Trinidadian footballer
- Dolley Madison (née Payne) (1768–1849), First Lady of the United States
- Don Payne (writer) (1964–2013), American television and film writer and producer
- Donald Payne (disambiguation), several people
- Dougie Payne (born 1972), bassist and vocalist for the band Travis
- Douglas Payne (1875–1965), British actor

=== E ===
- Eddie Payne, American college basketball coach
- Eddie N. Payne (1873–1951), American politician
- Edgar Alwin Payne (1883–1947), Landscape painter, muralist, Western American artist
- Edna Payne, American actress
- Ernest Payne (disambiguation), several people
- Ethan Payne, English YouTuber, streamer, and internet personality
- Ethel L. Payne (1911–1991), African-American journalist

=== F ===
- Fernandus Payne (1881–1977), American zoologist
- Franklin Payne, American politician, Missouri state senator
- Freda Payne (born 1942), American singer and actress
- Frederick G. Payne (1904–1978), American politician

=== G ===
- Gareth Payne (1935–2004), Welsh rugby player

=== H ===
- Harry Payne (disambiguation), several people
- Henry Payne (disambiguation), several people
- Howard Payne (disambiguation), several people
- Howie Payne, English singer-songwriter
- Humfry Payne (1902–1936), English archaeologist

=== J ===
- Jack Payne (disambiguation), several people
- James Dennis Payne, British military aviator
- Jeremy Payne (born 2005), American football player
- Jira Payne, American politician
- Jody Payne (1936–2013), American guitarist and musician, with Willie Nelson
- Joe Payne (1984–2020), American heavy metal bassist and guitarist, member of the band Divine Heresy
- Joe Payne (footballer, born 1914) (1914–1975), English footballer
- John Payne (disambiguation), several people named John or Johnny
  - J. Carroll Payne (1855–1936), American lawyer
- Joseph Payne (1808–1876), English educationalist
- Joseph Payne (musician) (1937–2008), English harpsichordist, organist and musicologist
- Joseph Payne (cricketer) (1829–1880), English cricketer

=== K ===
- Katharine Payne (born 1937), bioacoustics researcher
- Keri-Anne Payne (born 1987), South African-born British swimmer
- Keith Payne (born 1933), Vietnam veteran, Australian recipient of the Victoria Cross
- Kevin Payne (disambiguation), several people
- King Payne, Seminole chief

=== L ===
- Larry Payne (born 1950), African American teenager who was murdered by a police officer
- Leonard A. Payne (1894–1919), British military pilot from Swaziland
- Les Payne, American journalist
- Lewis Payne, alias of Lewis Powell (conspirator) (1844–1865), Lincoln assassination conspirator
- Lewis S. Payne (1819–1898), New York politician
- Liam Payne (1993–2024), British singer with the band One Direction
- Louis Payne (1873 – 1954), American character actor
- Luke Payne, American college basketball coach and former player

=== M ===
- Mandy Payne, British artist
- Marise Payne, Australian Senator
- Marita Payne, Canadian athlete
- Matthew Payne (born 2002), Supercars race car driver
- Maxx Payne (October 1961) American musician, actor and retired professional wrestler
- Michael Gustavius Payne (born 1969), Welsh painter
- Michelle Payne (born 1985), Australian jockey

=== N ===
- Naomi Payne, British archaeologist
- Nicolle Payne, American Olympic water polo goalkeeper
- Nina Payne, American dancer in Paris

=== O ===
- Odie Payne, American blues drummer

=== P ===
- Patricia Payne (screenwriter), Australian screenwriter and film producer
- Patricia Payne (mezzo-soprano) (born 1942), New Zealand opera singer
- Pheldarius Payne (born 2000), American football player

=== Q ===
- Quorey Payne (born 1982), American football player

=== R ===
- Robert Payne (disambiguation), several people, including

- Robert Payne (author) (1911–1983), British novelist, historian and biographer

- Roger Payne, biologist and environmentalist
- Ron Payne (1925–2015), Australia politician.
- Ronald Payne (1926–2013), British journalist and espionage author
- Rosanna Catherine Payne (1884–1954), American politician
- Rosemary Payne (1933–2026), British discus thrower
- Russell Payne (author), English writer and artist
- Rufus Payne, American blues musician

=== S ===
- Sally Payne, American actress
- Sam Payne, stage name used by Danish singer Gustav Winckler
- Sandra Payne (disambiguation)
- Sara Payne (born 1969), British campaigner
- Sarah Payne (1992–2000), British murder victim, see Murder of Sarah Payne
- Scherrie Payne (born 1944), American singer, member of The Supremes
- Sean Payne, drummer for British band The Zutons
- Stanley G. Payne, historian of modern Spain and European fascism
- Stefan Payne, Football Player (Born 1991)
- Stephen Payne (disambiguation), several people
- Steve Payne (disambiguation), several people
- Sylvia Payne, physician

=== T ===
- Theodore Payne, American horticulturist
- Thelston Payne, Barbados and West Indies cricket player
- Thomas Payne (disambiguation), or Tom, several people
- Tim Payne (disambiguation), several people
- Tony Payne, American darts player
- Trip Payne, American puzzle designer

=== V ===
- Virginia Payne, American radio actress
- VJ Payne (born 2004), American football player

=== W ===
- William Payne (painter) (1760–1830), English painter and etcher who invented the tint Payne's grey
- William H. Payne (1836–1907), American educator and translator
- Wyndham Payne (1888–1974), English artist, illustrator, painter, model-maker and muralist

=== Z ===
- Zach Payne, Indiana politician and businessman

== Fictional characters ==
- Max Payne, fictional character, protagonist of the game series of the same name

== See also ==
- Paine (surname)
- Payn, a list of people with the surname
