= Paine (surname) =

Origin
- Origin: Saxon
- Region of origin: England

Other names
- Variant form: Payne

Paine is a surname. The Oxford Dictionary of Family Names in Britain and Ireland records it as a variant of Paines,Payne, along with Pain, Payn, Pane, Payen, Payan, Panes, and Pagan. The name Payne is believed to derive from the medieval English personal name Pagan.

Notable people with the surname include:

- Albert Paine (1861–1937), American author and biographer
- Albert Ingraham Paine (1874–1949), English soldier and cricketer
- Allie Paine (1919–2008), American college basketball player
- Augustus G. Paine Sr. (1839–1915), American financier
- Augustus G. Paine Jr. (1866–1947), American paper manufacturer and bank official
- Bayard H. Paine (1872–1955), justice of the Nebraska Supreme Court
- Charles Jackson Paine (1833–1916), American Civil War general and America's Cup yachtsman
- Eleazer A. Paine (1815–1882), American Civil War general
- Elijah Paine (1757–1842), U.S. Senator from Vermont
- Ephraim Paine (1730–1785), Continental Congressman from New York
- George Paine (disambiguation), several people
- Godfrey Paine (1871–1932), Royal Navy and Royal Air Force officer
- Halbert E. Paine (1826–1905), American Civil War general
- Harriet Evans Paine (1822–1917), Texas storyteller and oral historian
- James Paine (disambiguation), multiple people
- John Paine (disambiguation), multiple people
- Lyman Paine (1901–1978), American architect
- Lynn S. Paine, American economist
- Mary Wheaton Paine (1936–2015), American actress
- Michael Paine (1928–2018), acquaintance of Lee Harvey Oswald
- Robert Treat Paine (1731–1814), signer of the U.S. Declaration of Independence or any of several Americans by this name
- Roxy Paine (born 1966), American artist
- Ruth Paine (1932–2025), American woman who was Michael Paine's wife and housed Marina Oswald, leading up to the assassination of John F. Kennedy
- Sumner Paine (1868–1904), American Olympic marksman
- Terry Paine (born 1939), English footballer
- Thomas Paine (disambiguation), several people
  - Thomas Paine (1739–1809), U.S. Founding Father and author of Common Sense, Rights of Man and The Age of Reason
- Tim Paine (born 1984), Australian cricketer
- William Paine (disambiguation), several people

== See also ==
- Pain (surname)
- Payne (surname)
