= Pain (surname) =

Pain is a surname. The Oxford Dictionary of Family Names in Britain and Ireland records it as a variant of Payne, along with Paine, Paines, Payn, Pane, Payen, Payan, Panes, and Pagan. The name Payne is believed to derive from the medieval English personal name Pagan. The Dictionary of American Family Names describes Pain as a variant of the name Paine.

Pain is also an alternative spelling of the Indian surname Pyne.

Notable people with the surname include (birth date order):

- Elizabeth Pain (c. 1652–1704), settler in Boston, Massachusetts
- James Pain (1779–1877), English architect
- Arthur Pain (1841–1920), bishop in Australia
- William Plain (1855–1924), British army officer
- Barry Pain (1864–1928), English journalist, poet and writer
- Edwin Pain (1891–1947), English cricketer
- Nesta Pain (1905–1995), British broadcaster and writer
- Peter Pain (1913–2003), British judge
- Rollo Pain (1921–2005), British army officer
- Edward Pain (1925–2000), Australian rower
- Jean Pain (1928–1981), Swiss inventor
- Denis Pain (1936–2019), New Zealand judge and sports administrator
- Quentin Pain (born 1956), British writer on accounting and entrepreneur
- Richard Pain (born 1956), bishop in Wales
- Susanna Pain (1957-), Australian Anglican priest, spiritual director
- Bedabrata Pain (born 1963), Indian scientist and film director
- Debbie Pain (active 1988–), British conservation biologist
- Jeff Pain (born 1970), Canadian skeleton racer
- François Pain (active 1990s), French film-maker
- T-Pain (born 1984), American musician
- Erwan Pain (born 1986), French ice hockey player
- Mélanie Pain (active 2004–), French singer
- Connor Pain (born 1993), Australian soccer player

== See also ==
- Paine (surname)
- Pyne (surname)
