= Pains =

Pains may refer to:

== Medicine ==
- Pain
- Suffering
- Pan-assay interference compounds or PAINS in the assay

== Places ==
=== Brazil ===
- Pains, Minas Gerais
- Pains, district of Santa Maria
  - Pains, Santa Maria

=== Elsewhere ===
- Pains Hill (disambiguation)
- Pains Island, Gulf of Carpentaria, Queensland, Australia

== Other uses ==
- Pains (EP), by Islander, 2013

== See also ==
- Pain (disambiguation)
- Paine (disambiguation)
- Payne (disambiguation)
