= Albert Payne =

Albert Payne may refer to:

- Albert Payne (cricketer) (1885–1908), English cricketer
- Albert Henry Payne (1812–1902), English steel engraver, painter and illustrator
- Wyndham Payne (Albert Wyndham Payne, 1888–1974), English artist and illustrator

== See also ==
- Albert Paine (1861–1937), American author and biographer
- Albert Ingraham Paine (1874–1949), English soldier and cricketer
