= James Payne =

James Payne may refer to:

- James Payne (cricketer), English cricketer
- James Spriggs Payne (1819–1882), President of Liberia
- James Dennis Payne (1896–1987), World War I aviator
- James W. Payne (1929–1992), American set decorator
- James H. Payne (1941–2025), American judge
- James Arthur Payne (1884–1968), American fly rod maker, designer and business owner
- James L. Payne, American social scientist
- James Payne (hurdler) (born 1907), American hurdler, 1929 All-American for the USC Trojans track and field team

== See also ==
- Jim Payne (disambiguation)
- Jimmy Payne (1926–2013), English footballer
- James Payn (1830–1898), English novelist
- James Paine (disambiguation)
