= Pain (disambiguation) =

Pain is a distressing feeling often caused by intense or damaging stimuli.

Pain may also refer to:

- Psychological pain, mental or emotional pain
- Psychogenic pain, physical pain caused by psychological factors

== Arts ==
- "Pain", a season one episode of Stargate Universe
- "Pain", an episode of The Good Doctor
- Pain (film), a 1953 Mexican-Spanish musical comedy film
- Pain (journal), a monthly peer-reviewed medical journal
- Pain (video game), an action video game developed by Idol Minds and published by Sony Computer Entertainment for PlayStation 3
- The Pain – When Will It End?, a cartoon drawn by Tim Kreider

=== Characters ===
- Nagato (Naruto) (also Pain), fictional character in the manga and anime series Naruto
- Pain, a demon from the Disney animated feature Hercules
- The Pain, a character from the Metal Gear franchise

=== Music ===
==== Groups ====
- Pain (musical project), a Swedish heavy metal and electronic music project
- Salvo (band) (previously Pain), an American punk rock group

==== Albums ====
- Pain (The Letter Black album) or the title song, 2017
- Pain (Ohio Players album) or the title song, 1972
- Pain (Rhino Bucket album) or the title song, 1994
- Pain, by Dub War, 1995
- Pain, an EP by Boy Harsher, or the title song, 2015

==== Songs ====
- "Pain" (De La Soul song), 2016
- "Pain" (Fun Factory song), 1994
- "Pain" (Jimmy Eat World song), 2004
- "Pain" (PinkPantheress song), 2021
- "Pain" (Three Days Grace song), 2006
- "Pain", by 2Pac from the Above the Rim film soundtrack, 1994
- "Pain", by Alice Cooper from Flush the Fashion, 1980
- "Pain", by Anastacia from Evolution, 2017
- "Pain", by Blackfield from Blackfield, 2004
- "Pain", by Four Star Mary, 2001
- "Pain", by Hollywood Undead from Swan Songs B-Sides, 2009
- "Pain", by the Indigo, 2001
- "Pain", by Ingrid Andress from Good Person, 2022
- "Pain", by Jaden from Erys, 2019
- "Pain", by King Princess, 2020
- "Pain", by Kittie from Oracle, 2001
- "Pain", by Lionheart from Love Don't Live Here, 2016
- "Pain", by LUXT from Jezebel Thirteen Three, 1996
- "Pain", by Ms. Dynamite from Judgement Days, 2005
- "Pain", by Muni Long, 2022
- "Pain", by Nessa Barrett, 2020
- "Pain", by Of Mice & Men from Cold World, 2016
- "Pain", by Oingo Boingo from Boi-ngo, 1987
- "Pain", by Onslaught from Killing Peace, 2007
- "Pain", by Puff Daddy from No Way Out, 1997
- "Pain", by Puff Daddy from Forever, 1999
- "Pain", by Pusha T from My Name Is My Name, 2013
- "Pain", by Sadus from The Shadow Inside, 2023
- "Pain", by Soulfly from Primitive, 2000
- "Pain", by Stereomud from Perfect Self, 2001
- "Pain", by the Used from Lies for the Liars, 2007
- "Pain", by the War on Drugs from A Deeper Understanding, 2017
- "The Pain", by Lacuna Coil from Shallow Life, 2009
- "The Pain", by Tove Lo from Queen of the Clouds, 2014

== People ==
- Pain fitzJohn (died 1137), Anglo-Norman nobleman and administrator
- Angie Hulley (née Pain; born 1962), English retired female long-distance runner
- Barry Pain (1864–1928), English author
- Connor Pain (born 1993), Australian professional football player
- Elizabeth Pain (c. 1652 – 1704), settler in colonial Boston
- Jeff Pain (born 1970), American-born Canadian former skeleton racer
- T-Pain (born 1985), American rapper, singer, songwriter and record producer

== Places ==
- Deh-e Pain, Lamerd (also Pā’īn), a village in Kal Rural District, Eshkanan District, Lamerd County, Fars Province, Iran
- Pain, Kerman, a village in Gevar Rural District, Sarduiyeh District, Jiroft County, Kerman Province, Iran
- McKinley National Park Airport (ICAO code: PAIN), a public-use airport located two nautical miles northeast of McKinley Park

== Other ==
- P.A.I.N., an advocacy organization founded by Nan Goldin to respond to the opioid crisis
- Pain (philosophy), a topic in philosophy
- Payment Initialization, an electronic message type group within ISO 20022 known for its usage within the Single Euro Payments Area
- Suffering, an experience of unpleasantness and aversion associated with the perception of harm or threat of harm in an individual

== See also ==
- Pain and Suffering (disambiguation)
- Paine (disambiguation)
- Pains (disambiguation)
- Pan (disambiguation)
- Pane (disambiguation)
- Payne (disambiguation)
