= John Payne =

John Payne may refer to:

== Arts and entertainment ==
- John D. Payne (born 1979/1980), one half of the J. D. Payne and Patrick McKay screenwriting duo
- John Howard Payne (1791–1852), American actor and playwright
- John Payne (actor) (1912–1989), American film actor and singer
- "Sunshine" Sonny Payne (John William Payne, 1925–2018), American radio presenter
- Johnny Payne, American dramatist, novelist, scholar, and university professor
- John Payne (voice actor) (born 1960), English-born Canadian voice actor
- John Payne (engraver) (1607–1647), English engraver
- John Payne (poet) (1842–1916), English poet and translator
- John Payne (singer) (born 1958), British singer for rock band Asia

== Politics ==
- John Barton Payne (1855–1935), American politician, lawyer and judge, U.S. Secretary of the Interior 1920–1921
- John D. Payne (born 1950), Republican member of the Pennsylvania House of Representatives
- John Otunba Payne (1839–1906), Nigerian administrator and diarist
- John Payne (New Zealand politician) (1871–1942), New Zealand politician
- John Payne (Queensland politician) (1860–1928), member of the Queensland Legislative Assembly

== Religion ==
- John Payne (bishop of Meath) (died 1507), Irish bishop
- John Payne (martyr) (1532–1582), English Catholic priest and martyr
- John Payne (bishop of Liberia) (1815–1874), American missionary from the Episcopal Church to Africa

== Sports ==
- John Payne (cricketer, born 1828) (1828–1887), English cricketer, father of the below
- John Payne (rugby union, born 1858) (1858–1942), English rugby union footballer and cricketer, son of the above
- John Payne (footballer, born 1889)
- John Payne (footballer, born 1906) (1906–1981), British footballer
- John Payne (American football) (1933–2019), American football coach
- John Payne (Australian footballer) (born 1950), Australian rules footballer
- John Payne (umpire) (1844–1928), Australian cricket umpire
- John Somers Payne (1926–2013), Irish Olympic sailor
- John Payne (rugby union, born 1980), Australian-born Tongan rugby union player

== Other ==
- John Willett Payne (1752–1803), British admiral

== See also ==
- SS John Barton Payne, a Liberty ship
- John Payn (disambiguation)
- John Paine (disambiguation)
- Jack Payne (disambiguation)
- John Bayne (disambiguation)
