= Payn =

Payn is a surname. Notable people with the surname include:

- Graham Payn (1918–2005), South African-born English actor and singer
- John Payn (disambiguation), multiple people
- James Payn (1830–1898), British novelist
- Richard Payn, MP for Shaftesbury (UK Parliament constituency)

== See also ==
- Payne (disambiguation)
