= The Suffering =

The Suffering or Suffering may refer to:

The Suffering

- The Suffering (video game), by Midway Games and Surreal Software
  - The Suffering: Ties That Bind, the sequel to the aforementioned game
- The Suffering (song), a song by Coheed and Cambria
- The Iced Earth song trilogy consisting of the last three tracks from The Dark Saga
- "The Suffering", a song by Lagwagon from the album Railer
- The Suffering (Doctor Who audio), a Doctor Who "Companion Chronicles" audiobook.
- The Suffering (film), a 2016 American horror/thriller film

Suffering

- Suffering, pain in a broad sense
- Dukkha, the Buddhist principle
- "Suffering", a song by Carnifex from the album The Diseased and the Poisoned
- Jeff Suffering (born Jeff Bettger), American musician

== See also ==
- Suffer (disambiguation)
- Endurance, sufferance
- Pain and Suffering (disambiguation)
- This Suffering, a 2007 song by Billy Talent
