= Paine =

Paine may refer to:

== Geography ==
- Paine, Chile
- Paine College, a defunct Historically Black college in Augusta, Georgia
- Paine Field, an airport in Everett, Washington, United States
- Paine Lake, a lake in Minnesota
- Paine River, a waterstream located in the Magallanes Region of Chile
- Cuernos del Paine, a mountain group in Chilean Patagonia
- Torres del Paine, a mountain group in Chilean Patagonia
- Cordillera del Paine, a mountain group in Chilean Patagonia

== Other ==
- Paine (surname)
- Paine (Final Fantasy), a fictional female character in the video game Final Fantasy X-2
- John Alsop Paine, botanist whose standard author abbreviation is "Paine"
- John Knowles Paine, an American-born composer
- Thomas Paine, (1737-1809) activist-philosopher
- Hurricane Paine, name of several storms in the Eastern Pacific Ocean

== See also ==
- Payne (disambiguation)
- Pain (disambiguation)
- Justice Paine (disambiguation)
