= Pane =

Pane or Panes may refer to:

- Paned window (architecture), a window that is divided into sections known as "panes"
- Paned window (computing), elements of a graphical display
- Pane (mythology), a type of satyr-like creature from Greek mythology
- Pane di Altamura, type of bread made from flour from the Altamura area of the Provincia di Bari, in the South East of Italy
- Panes, Asturias, one of eight parishes in Peñamellera Baja, a municipality within the province and autonomous community of Asturias, in northern Spain.

== People ==
Pane

- Alessandro Pane (born 1967), Italian footballer
- Armijn Pane (1908–1970), an Indonesian author. Also known as Adinata, A. Soul, Empe, A. Mada, A. Banner and Kartono
- Chris Pane (born 1953), American football player
- Gina Pane (1939–1990), French artist of Italian origins
- Irma Pane, Indonesian American pop singer
- Karen W. Pane, American administrator, former Assistant Secretary for Policy and Planning at the Department of Veterans Affairs
- Lafran Pane (1922–1991), Indonesian academic
- Luigi Pane, Italian director and video artist
- Mauro Pane (1963–2014), Italian driver, kart driver champion
- Michele Pane (1876–1953), Italian American symbolist poet and journalist
- Mikill Pane (born 1985), English rapper
- Roberto Pane (1897–1987) Italian art historian
- Sanusi Pane (1905–1968), Indonesian writer, journalist, and historian

Panes

- Michael Panes (born 1963), American actor, writer, musician and composer
- Roger Panes (1933–1974), British member of the Exclusive branch of the Plymouth Brethren. In 1974 he killed his wife and three children with an axe before hanging himself
- Roo Panes (born 1988), British singer-songwriter

== See also ==
- Pain (disambiguation)
- Pan (disambiguation)
- Panel (disambiguation)
