= Julie Payne =

Julie Payne may refer to:

- Julie Payne (actress, born 1940) (1940–2019), American actress, career lasted from 1959 to 1967
- Julie Payne (actress, born 1946), American actress, career started in 1968

== See also ==
- Payne (name)
