= Judge Payne =

Judge Payne may refer to:

- Harry Vearle Payne (1908–1983), judge of the United States District Court for the District of New Mexico
- James H. Payne (born 1941), judge of the United States District Court for the Eastern, Northern, and Western Districts of Oklahoma
- John Barton Payne (1855–1935), judge on the Superior Court of Cook County, Illinois
- Robert E. Payne (born 1941), judge of the United States District Court for the Eastern District of Virginia
- Roy S. Payne (fl. 1970s–2020s), magistrate judge of the United States District Court for the Eastern District of Texas

== See also ==
- Justice Paine (disambiguation)
