= Harold Payne =

Harold Payne may refer to:

- Harold Payne (golfer) in West Virginia Amateur Championship
- Harold Payne (musician) on Peregrins (album)

== See also ==
- Harry Payne (disambiguation)
