= Jean-Jacques Lebel =

French painter

- Born: June 30, 1936 (age 90); Paris, France
- Education: Paris 8 University
- Children: Hopi Lebel
- Awards: Courage Award for the Arts (2011); Commandeur des Arts et des Lettres (2016)

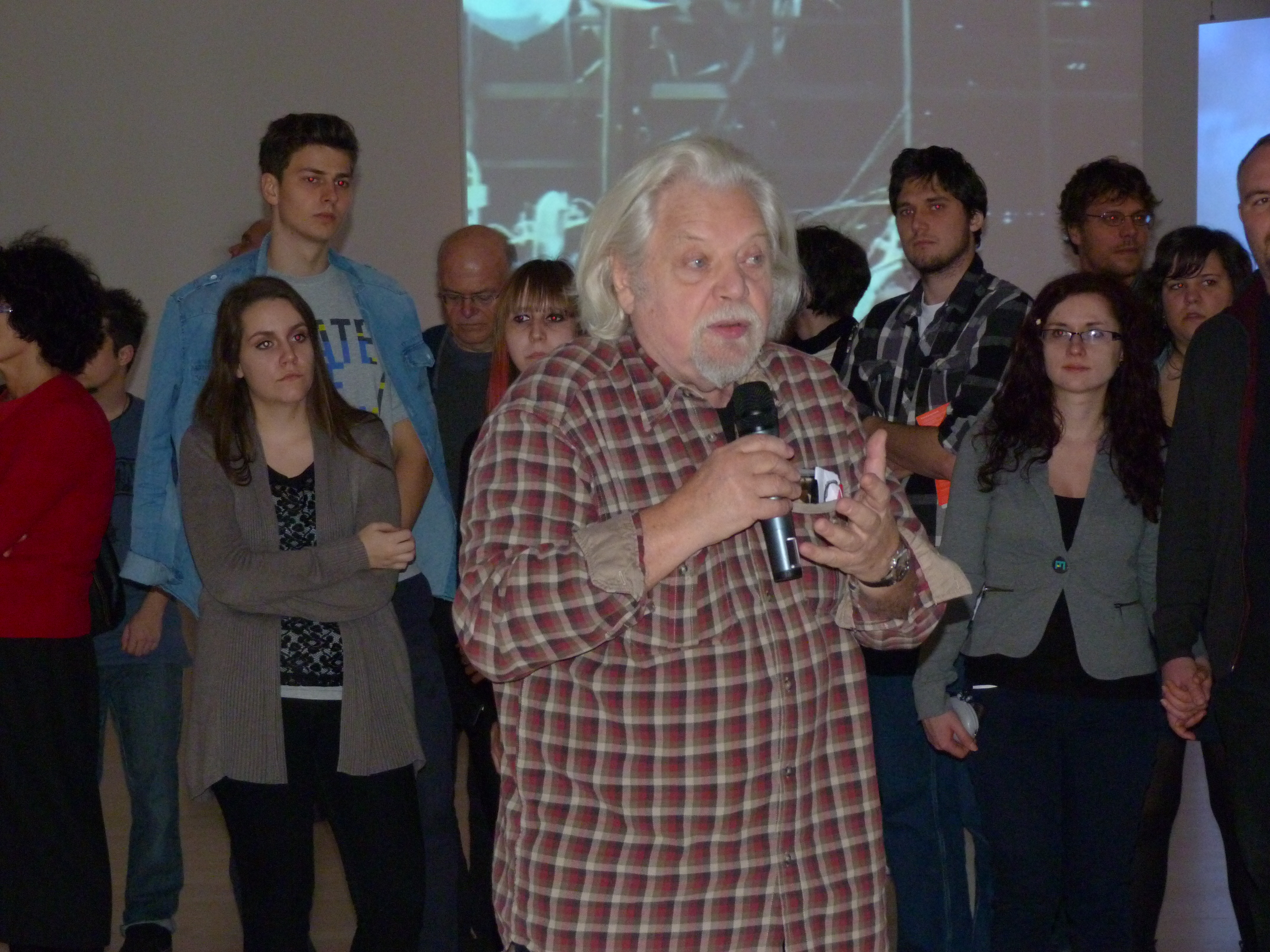
Jean-Jacques Lebel - Exhibition Beat Generation, 2013

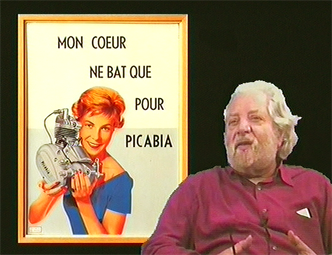
Jean-Jacques Lebel in 2008

Jean-Jacques Lebel (French: [ləbɛl]; born 30 June 1936, Paris) is a French visual artist, poet, art collector, writer, political activist, and creator of performance art happening art events. Besides his heterogeneous artworks and poetry, Lebel is also known for his very early work with the Beat Generation and Happenings, as an art theory writer with close ties to Félix Guattari, Gilles Deleuze and the American poetry and art scene. He is also an art curator and son of Robert Lebel; a poet, translator, poetry publisher, political activist, art collector, art historian and expert in the work of Marcel Duchamp.

== Life and work ==
Lebel had his first exhibition in 1955 at Galleria Numero in Florence, Italy. After a brief period of time with Surrealists, Lebel exhibited in Milan and Paris, and then went on to exhibit at various museums and galleries around the world. He has regularly collaborated with artist and writer Arnaud Labelle-Rojoux.

Beginning in 1955, Lebel published a poetry journal called Front Unique and organized various nomadic poetry festivals, such as La Libre Expression (Free Expression) in 1964 and Polyphonix in 1979. In the 1960s, Lebel translated into French and published various work by William S. Burroughs, Allen Ginsberg, Michael McClure, Lawrence Ferlinghetti and Gregory Corso.

In 1960, Lebel oversaw and partook in the first European Happening L'enterrement de la Chose in Venice. For his performance there - called Happening Funeral Ceremony of the Anti-Process - Lebel invited the audience to attend a ceremony in formal dress. In a decorated room within a grand residence, a draped "cadaver" rested on a plinth which was then ritually stabbed by an "executioner" while a "service" was read consisting of extracts from the French décadent writer Joris-Karl Huysmans and le Marquis de Sade. Then pall-bearers carried the coffin out into a gondola and the "body" - which was in fact a mechanical sculpture by Jean Tinguely - was ceremonially slid into the canal.

During the 1960s, Lebel closely followed the work of the avant-garde American theatre group The Living Theatre. He extensively interviewed the group's members and accompanied them during rehearsal, which would lead to the 1969 book Entretiens avec le Living Theatre.

Lebel published the first critical essay in French on the Happening movements throughout the world, citing the 1920 Dada-Messe (First International Dada Fair) as the key precedent of the modern happening in Europe. After this, he produced over 70 Happenings, performances and actions on numerous continents, including Pour conjurer l'esprit de catastrophe (1962), Déchirex (1965) and 120 minutes dédiées au divin marquis (1966). In 1967 he staged in Gassin at the Festival de la Libre Expression Pablo Picasso's 1941 surrealist theatrical farce in six acts Le Désir attrapé par la queue (Desire Caught by the Tail). For it, Lebel invited Soft Machine to perform and later that year Lebel was arrested for promoting nudity in Knokke, Belgium for a happening he did with Yoko Ono.

In 1968, Lebel took part in the activities of Mouvement du 22-mars, followed by Noir et Rouge, an anarchist group, and the Socialist splinter group Informations et Correspondences Ouvrières. Lebel also followed the philosophical teachings of Gilles Deleuze at Faculty de Vincennes at Paris 8 University. 1980 Lebel organized a Performance Festival at the ARC - Musée d'Art Moderne de la Ville de Paris, amongst others with Harry de Kroon, Julien Blaine, Joel Hubaut and Barbara Heinisch.

With François Pain he produced the 90 minute long Monument à Félix Guattari, le film and in 1994 he installed a large assemblage entitled Monument à Félix Guattari in the Forum of the Centre Pompidou.

Since 2001 he has frequently exhibited his Manifestation Itinérante and his digital art morphing animation Reliquaire pour un culte de Vénus that is based on the concept of vénusté as put forward by Pierre Klossowski.

In 2001, he was the guest curator at the Montreal Museum of Fine Arts of the erotic work of Pablo Picasso called Picasso Erotique and appeared on the Charlie Rose show. The exhibition traveled to the Museu Picasso in Barcelona and Galerie nationale du jeu de paume in Paris. A book entitled Picasso Erotique was produced by Prestel Publishing in 2001 as a result of the show. This book contains texts by Lebel, Pablo Picasso, Annie Le Brun, Pascal Quignard, Patrick Roegiers and Malen Gual.

In 2009, La Maison Rouge in Paris presented all facets of Lebel's work (artist, exhibition curator, writer, performer, and art festival organizer) in an exhibition entitled Jean-Jacques Lebel, Soulèvements. The exhibition was divided into the following themes: Happenings, Insubordination, Poetry, Hallucination, Eros, Dada, War and the Rhizome - and was illustrated with works of primitive art, works by anonymous artists and others such as Johann Heinrich Füssli, Giuseppe Arcimboldo, Louise Michel, Charles Fourier, Ravachol, Guillaume Apollinaire, Marcel Duchamp, Pablo Picasso, Otto Dix, George Grosz, André Breton, Francis Picabia, Antonin Artaud, Victor Brauner, Bernard Heidsieck, Erró, Antonio Saura, and Peter Saul. Some three hundred works in all. The show curator was Jean de Loisy.

In 2013, Laure Adler produced an extensive radio interview with Lebel called L'iconoclaste Jean-Jacques Lebel (in 5 parts) that was broadcast on France Culture. In 2018 he co-organized at the Palais de Tokyo an exhibition on the theme of evil and repair called L’Un et l’Autre (One and the Other) and also that year was honored by a solo exhibition of his early work at the Centre Pompidou entitled l'outrepasseur.

In 2024, the Centre Pompidou presented the exhibition Chaosmose: Fonds de dotation Jean-Jacques Lebel that displays the endowment collaboration between the Jean-Jacques Lebel Endowment Fund and the Musée National d'Art Moderne.

== Bibliography ==
- Jean-Jacques Lebel: des années cinquante aux ann es quatre-vingt-dix, Mazzotta, Milano, 1991, 78 p., ill., colour, b&w.
- Jean-Jacques Lebel: Retour d'exil. Peintures, dessins, collages 1954–1988, Galerie 1900/2000, Paris, 1988.
- Blistène, Bernard: Jean-Jacques Lebel. Una intervista. Jean-Jacques Lebel. An Interview, in: FLUXUS Flash Art, No. 84-85, 1978 October- November, 57–63.
- Faye, Jean Pierre - Jean-Jacques Lebel (eds.): Polyphonix, Change, No. 42 (special issue dedicated to Polyphonix 5), 1983, 168 p., ill., b&w.
- Félix Guattari: Jean-Jacques Lebel - Maler der Transversalität. Jean-Jacques Lebel - Painter of Transversality, in: Todoroff, Uli - Sophie Haaser (eds.): Jean-Jacques Lebel. Builder, Skulpturen, Installationen, Museum Moderner Kunst Stiftung Ludwig Wien, Wien, 1998. 35–40.
- Hegyi Dóra: Jean-Jacques Lebel. Kortárs Mûvészeti Múzeum Ludwig Múzeum Budapest. 1998. április 2 - május 10, in: Jump magazin, No. 1, 1998. 36.
- Hegyi Dóra (ed.): Jean-Jacques Lebel, Ludwig Kortárs Mûvészeti Múzeum-Ludwig Múzeum, Budapest, 1998.
- Labelle-Rojoux, Arnaud (ed.): Entretien avec Jean-Jacques Lebel, in: Loisy, Jean de (ed.): Hors limites. L'art et la vie 1952–1994, Centre Georges Pompidou, Paris, 1994, 109–115.
- Lebel, Jean-Jacques: D'une Biennale (1960) à l'autre (1990), in: Bonito Oliva, Achille - Gabriella.
- De Mila - Claudio Cerritelli (eds.): Ubi fluxus ibi motus 1990–1962, Mazzotta, Milano, 1990, 75–79.
- Lebel, Jean-Jacques: De quoi il s'agit, Édition privée réservée aux amis, 1998.
- Lebel, Jean-Jacques: Déchirex, in: Tolvaly Ernô - Lengyel András (eds.): Kortárs Képzômûvészeti Szöveggyûjtemény, A & E '93 Kiadó, 1992, 84–85.
- Lebel, Jean-Jacques: Ginsberg/Flash/Ginsberg. Flash/Ginsberg/Flash, Édition privée réservée aux amis, 1997.
- Lebel, Jean-Jacques: Happenings d'une bastille, l'autre, in: Dreyfus, Charles (ed.): Happenings & Fluxus, Galerie 1900-2000 - Galerie du Genie - Galerie de Poche, Paris, 1989, 7–15.
- Lebel, Jean-Jacques: Julien Blaine. Éloge de la multiplicité, in: Kanal Europe, No. 1, 1993, 37.
- Lebel, Jean-Jacques: Le happening, Les Lettres Nouvelles, Denoël, 1966, 89 p., ill., b&w.
- Lebel, Jean-Jacques: Légende, in: Bonito Oliva, Achille - Gabriella De Mila - Claudio Cerritelli (eds.): Ubi fluxus ibi motus 1990–1962, Mazzotta, Milano, 1990, 81–84.
- Lebel, Jean-Jacques: Megjegyzések a politikai utcaszínházról, in: Ungvári Tamás (szerk.): A dráma mûvészek ma. Írók, rendezôk, kritikusok korunk drámájáról, Gondolat, Budapest, 1974, 468–475.
- Lebel, Jean-Jacques: On the Necessity of Violation, in: Sandford, Mariellen R. (ed.): Happenings and Other Acts, Routledge, London - New York, 1995, 268–284.
- Lebel, Jean-Jacques: On the Necessity of Violation. Paris Postscript, May/June 1968, in: Kristine Stiles - Peter Selz (eds.): Theories and Documents of Contemporary Art. A Sourcebook of Artists' Writings, University of California Press, Berkeley - Los Angeles - London, 1996, 718–722.
- Lebel, Jean-Jacques: Poésie directe des Happenings à Polyphonix. Entretiens avec Arnaud Labelle-Rojoux et quelques documents, Opus International Edition, Paris, 1994, 173 p., ill., b&w.
- Lebel, Jean-Jacques: Poésie en action, in: Janicot, Francoise (ed.): Poésie en Action, Loques - NèPE, Issy-les-Moulineaux, 1984, 5–15.
- Lebel, Jean-Jacques: Rue Rossini. Les rencontres Rossiniennes, Galleria di Franca Mancini, Pesaro, 1996, 47 p., ill., mainly colour.
- Lebel, Jean-Jacques: Umsonst (Bemerkungen zu den Happenings), in: Becker, Jürgen - Wolf Vostell (eds.): Happenings, Fluxus, Pop Art, Nouveau Réalisme. Eine Dokumentation, Rowohlt Verlag, Hamburg, 1965, 355–357.
- Lebel, Jean-Jacques: Entretiens avec le Living Theatre. Belfond, Paris, 1969.
- Lebel, Jean-Jacques: Vita Nuova, in: Kanal Europe, No. 1, 1993, 36.
- Lebel, Jean-Jacques - Daniel Pommerulle - Ferró - Tetsumi Kudo - Jocelyn de Noblé - Allan Zion - Claude Richard - Otto Hahn: Grundsätzliches zum Thema Happening. Für die Mitgleider des Workshops für freien Ausdruck, in: Becker, Jürgen - Wolf Vostell (eds.): Happenings, Fluxus, Pop Art, Nouveau Réalisme. Eine Dokumentation, Rowohlt Verlag, Hamburg, 1965, 357–360.
- Lebel, Jean-Jacques (ed.): Polyphonix 3. Festival International de Poesie Directe, American Center, Paris, 1981, 28 p., ill., b&w.
- Lebel, Jean-Jacques (ed.): Polyphonix 4. Festival International de Poesie Directe, Musique, Performance, Vidéo, American Center, Paris, 1982, 43 p., ill., b&w.
- Mahon, Alyce: Jean-Jacques Lebel és Marquis de Sade: a jólnevelt viselkedés megszegése. Outrages aux bonnes moeurs: Jean-Jacques Lebel and the Marquis de Sade, in: Hegyi Dóra (ed.): Jean- Jacques Lebel, Ludwig Kortárs Mûvészeti Múzeum-Ludwig Múzeum, Budapest, 1998, 18–45.
- Mahon, Alyce: Verstoss gegen die Guten Sitten: Jean-Jacques Lebel und der Marquis de Sade. Outrages aux bonnes moeurs: Jean-Jacques Lebel and the Marquis de Sade, in: Todoroff, Uli - Sophie Haaser (eds.): Jean-Jacques Lebel. Builder, Skulpturen, Installationen, Museum Moderner Kunst Stiftung Ludwig, Wien, 1998, 71–112.
- Mahon, Alyce, Jean-Jacques Lebel: Anti-Sculpture and Anti-Psychiatry, in: Sculpture and Psychoanalysis, B. Taylor (ed.), Aldershot: Ashgate/Henry Moore New Studies in Sculpture, 2006, pp. 117–137
- Martel, Richard - Françoise Dugré: Art action - entrevues. Pierre Restany. Jean-Jacques Lebel. Dick Higgins. Charles Dreyfus. Esther Ferrer. Julien Blaine. Jacques Donguy. Danièle Roussel. Bruce Barber. Felipe Ehrenberg. Bartolomé Ferrando. Giovanni Fontana. Simon Herbert. Elisabeth Jappe. Arnaud Labelle-Rojoux. Charlemagne Palestine. Slavka Sverakova. Martha Wilson. Laszlo Beke. Veronica Diesen. Lukasz Guzek, in: [Art Action / Dick Higgins] Inter Art Actuel, No. 73, 1999 Spring-Summer, 8-29.
- Catherine Millet: Jean-Jacques Lebel, az örök lázadó. Jean-Jacques Lebel Permanent Rebel, in: Hegyi Dóra (ed.): Jean-Jacques Lebel, Kortárs Mûvészeti Múzeum-Ludwig Múzeum, Budapest, 1998, 5–17.
- Kristine Stiles: "'Beautiful, Jean-Jacques': Jean-Jacques Lebel's Affect and the Theories of Gilles Deleuze and Félix Guattari", (Milano: Edizioni Gabriele Mazzotta, 1998): 7-30.
- Stiles, Kristine: "La Crise de l'avant-garde," and an "Interview with Jean-Jacques Lebel," + - 0 [Brussels] 34 (October, 1981): 32–33, 35–36.
- Stiles, Kristine: "Jean-Jacques Lebel’s Phoenix and Ashes," in Jean-Jacques Lebel (London: Mayor Gallery, 2003): 3–15.
- Todoroff, Uli - Sophie Haaser (eds.): Jean-Jacques Lebel. Builder, Skulpturen, Installationen, Museum Moderner Kunst Stiftung Ludwig Wien, Wien, 1998.

== See also ==
- Anti-art
- Fluxus
- Gutai group
- Art intervention
- Happening
- Pop art
- Neo-Dada
- Performance art
