= Ball Club, Minnesota =

Census-designated place in Minnesota, US

Ball Club Baaga'adowaaning (Ojibwe)
- Census-designated place
- Location within Minnesota Location within the United States
- Coordinates: 47°19′33″N 93°56′10″W
- Country: United States
- State: Minnesota
- County: Itasca

Area
  - Total: 2.76 sq mi (7.16 km^{2})
  - Land: 2.76 sq mi (7.16 km^{2})
  - Water: 0 sq mi (0.00 km^{2})
- Elevation: 1,302 ft (397 m)

Population (2020)
  - Total: 354
  - Density: 128.1/sq mi (49.45/km^{2})
- Time zone: UTC-6 (Central (CST))
  - Summer (DST): UTC-5 (CDT)
- Area code: 218
- GNIS feature ID: 655201

Ball Club (Ojibwe: Baaga'adowaaning) is an unincorporated community and census-designated place (CDP) in Itasca County, Minnesota, United States; located within the Leech Lake Indian Reservation. As of the 2020 census, Ball Club had a population of 354. Ball Club is located between Zemple and Bena.

The center of Ball Club is generally considered at the junction of U.S. Highway 2 and Itasca County Road 39. Ball Club is located 21 miles west of Grand Rapids.

Ball Club received its name from a type of Native American lacrosse stick. The majority of the community is populated by Native Americans of the Leech Lake Band of Ojibwe.

Ball Club's small economy includes a general store and gas station. The community also includes two churches, a clinic, a Headstart office, a community center, a water tower, and a Cordell.

The Mississippi River surrounds Ball Club on both the East and West side of the community. The boundary line between Itasca and Cass counties is in the vicinity.

Rosanna Catherine Payne served as the postmistress for Ball Club; Payne served in the Minnesota House of Representatives from 1927 to 1932.

== Demographics ==
Historical population
Census	Pop.	Note	%±
2020	354		—
U.S. Decennial Census
