= Ernest Payne =

Ernest Payne may refer to:

- Ernest Payne (cyclist) (1884–1961), English Olympic track cyclist
- Ernest Payne (footballer), English footballer
- Ernest Alexander Payne (1902–1980), British Baptist administrator and scholar
- Ernie Payne (1934–2010), Australian rules footballer
