= Jim Payne =

Jim Payne may refer to:

- Jim Payne (folk singer) (born 1955), Newfoundland folk singer
- Jim Payne (glider pilot) chief pilot with the Perlan Project Mission 2
- Jim Payne (golfer) (born 1970), English golfer
- Jim Payne, principal of Quixtar, an American company connected to Alticor
- James Payne, drummer for Tommy James and the Shondells
- James Arthur Payne (1884–1968), known as Jim, American fly rod maker, designer and business owner

== See also ==
- Jimmy Payne (1926–2013), English footballer
- James Payne (disambiguation)
