= Henry Payne =

Henry Payne may refer to:

- Henry Clay Payne (1843–1904), U.S. Postmaster
- Henry B. Payne (1810–1896), congressman and senator from Ohio
- Henry Payne (artist) (1868–1940), English Arts and Crafts artist
- Henry Nevil Payne (died c. 1710), British dramatist and Roman Catholic agitator
- Henry Payne (cartoonist) (born 1962), editorial cartoonist for The Detroit News and United Media
- Henry Payne (engineer) (1871–1945), Australian engineer and academic
- Henry Payne (MP), member of parliament for Wallingford

== See also ==
- Harry Payne (disambiguation)
