= John Payn =

John Payn may refer to:

- John Payn (MP for Cambridge), in 1391 MP for Cambridge
- John Payn (died 1402), MP for Norfolk

== See also ==
- John Payne (disambiguation)
- John Paine (disambiguation)
