= Diesel (company) =

Italian retail clothing company

Coordinates: 45.691672°N 11.561608°E

Diesel SpA

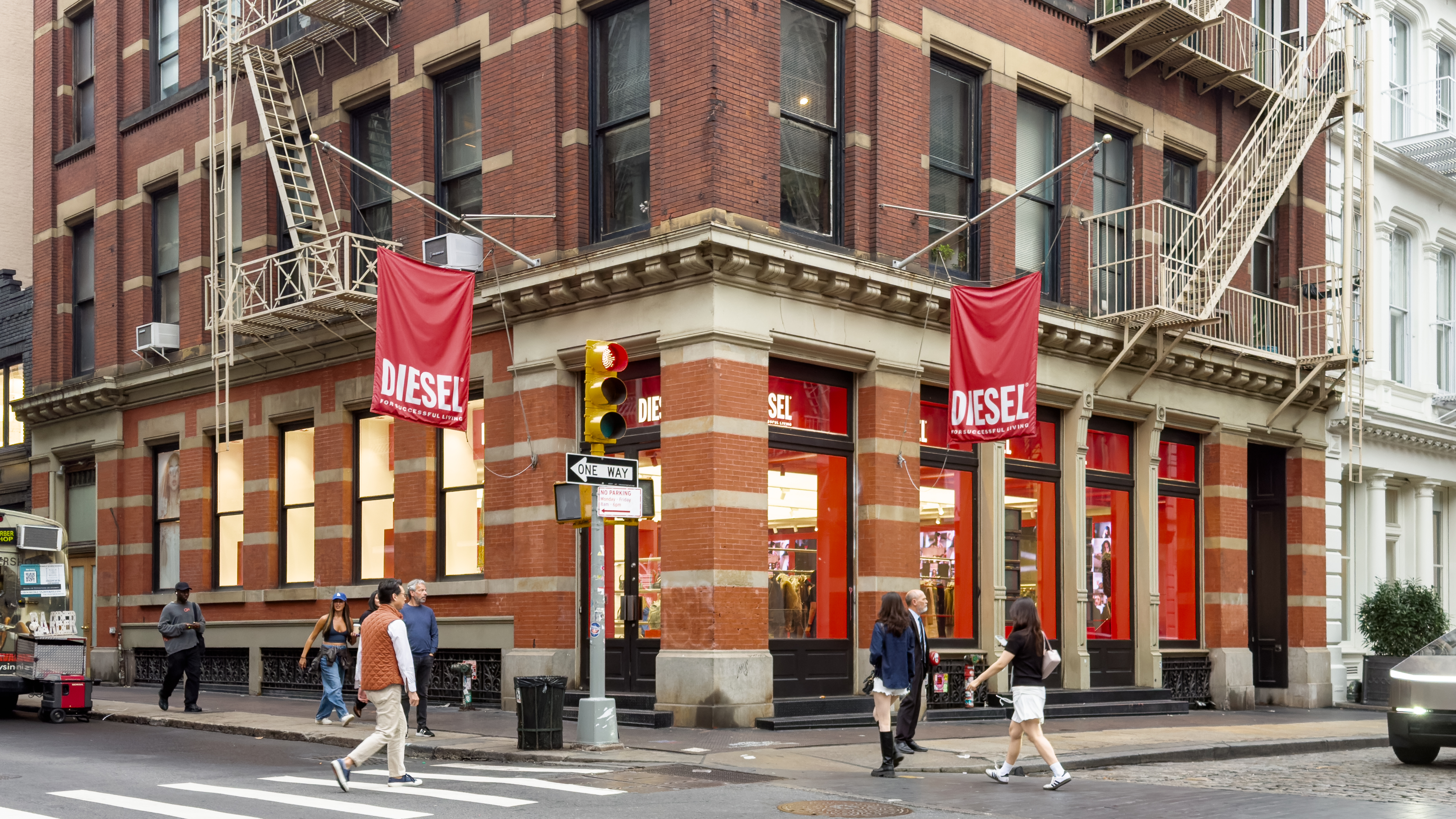
- Store in SoHo, Manhattan
- Formerly: Moltex
- Type: Private
- Industry: Fashion
- Founded: Molvena, Italy (1978; 48 years ago)
- Founder: Renzo Rosso
- Headquarters: Breganze, Veneto, Italy
- Key people: Renzo Rosso, president & founder Glenn Martens, artistic director
- Products: Clothing and Accessories
- Revenue: €2.1 billion (2015)
- Parent: OTB Group
- Website: diesel.com

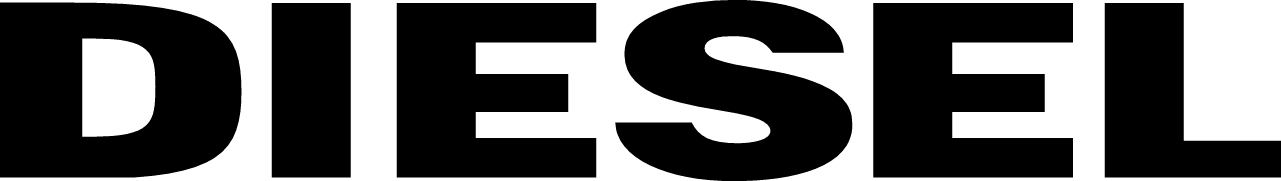
Alternative Diesel logo used 2006–2010 and 2015–2020

Diesel S.p.A. is a retail brand headquartered in Breganze, Italy known for luxury denim which also vends clothing, footwear, and accessories. It is part of OTB Group.

Belgian designer Glenn Martens was appointed artistic director of Diesel in October 2020.

== History ==
=== Beginnings ===
Diesel founder Renzo Rosso began stitching jeans on a sewing machine at the age of fifteen. He used his mother's sewing machine to produce low-riding, bell bottomed jeans, which he would wear himself and sell to his friends for 3,500 lire a piece. He later attended an industrial textile manufacturing high school in Padua.

In 1976, Rosso began working for a clothing manufacturer called Moltex, which was owned by Adriano Goldschmied. After working with the company for two years, he used a loan from his father to buy a 40% holding in the company, which changed its name to Diesel, and marketed jeans under the Diesel brand and many others. Rosso bought out Goldschmied's interest in the Diesel brand name in 1985 for US$500,000, becoming the sole owner of the company. Rosso has said that he learned marketing from the US, creativity from Italy, and systems from Germany.

=== 1990s ===
During the first part of the 1990s, Rosso pioneered Diesel into the fashion world and set the grounds for its establishment in global markets. In 1990, Russ Togs, Inc. received the license to market and distribute Diesel lines in the United States and Mexico. By 1991, Russ Togs was going out of business, and sold Diesel Sportswear to Rosso upon ending the licensing deal. As a result of Russ Togs collapse, the creation of made in the USA Diesel products never came to fruition, and Diesel instead placed its made-in-Italy jeans and clothing in US stores.

In 1991, the company launched its first international marketing effort with the highly successful 'Guides for Successful Living' campaign series. The campaign won a Grand Prix at the Cannes Lions International Advertising Festival, the world's leading awards in advertising, in 1992. In the same year, Diesel also became the title sponsor for the World Superbike racing circuit. Diesel continued to ignore common marketing rules and began to establish itself as a major brand in the global fashion market. This was a result of Rosso's ambition to always break new grounds and his aspiration to work with most creative agencies and photographers around, including Pierre Winther, David LaChapelle, Terry Richardson, Ellen von Unwerth, Rankin, and Erwin Olaf.

Later, in 1995, the company launched one of its most popular yet provocative campaigns ever, featuring two kissing sailors staged at the peace celebration of World War II. Shot by photographer David LaChapelle, it was the first major public advertisement to show a homosexual couple kissing and was published at height of the "Don't ask, Don't tell" debates in the US, which had led the U.S. Government to refuse entry to military service for openly gay, lesbian, or bisexual persons. At the same time, Diesel launched one of the first significant fashion retail websites, which housed images of each of its collections. The first Diesel jeans to be sold online were available in Finland and Sweden starting in 1997. It then opened a virtual store that allowed home delivery for further markets the following year.

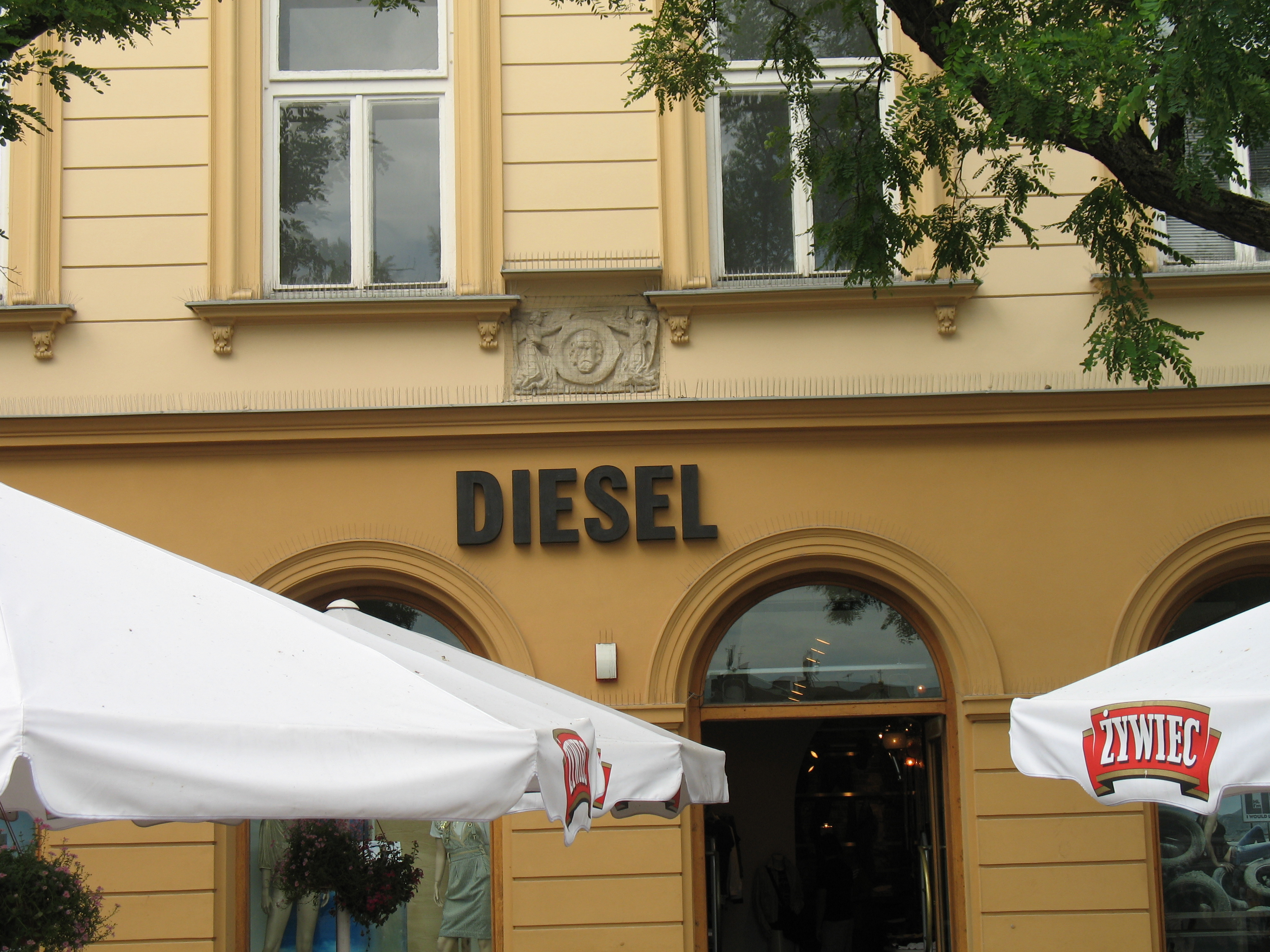
Diesel store in Kraków, Poland

In 1999, Diesel opened large flagship stores in New York City, San Francisco, Rome, and London, and began to open other mono-brand stores for Diesel in order to augment its points of sale in department and other multi-brand retails stores. Further flagship stores (also known as "StyleLabs") opened, including stores in Berlin, Barcelona, and Paris. Diesel also produces illustrated catalogs for its retail lines. The company also won the Premio Risultati award for Best Italian Company of the Year from the Bocconi Institute in 1996. In 1998, The Wall Street Journal called Diesel "the label of the moment".

=== 2000s and 2010s ===
Throughout the 2000s, Rosso increased Diesel's share in the global fashion market, mainly through opening more company owned stores, embarking on a series of brand collaborations, and by expanding on the business of Diesel. Diesel founder Rosso also began purchasing additional fashion companies in 2002, under the parent company Only The Brave (OTB), which Diesel was brought under as well. Companies purchased by Only the Brave included Maison Martin Margiela, Viktor & Rolf, Marni, and licensing company Staff International. In 2005, Diesel released the book "Fifty" upon Rosso's fiftieth birthday, an illustrated history of the company, with a print-run of ten thousand.

Diesel's headquarters are in Breganze, on the former Moto Laverda factory area, and had twelve international subsidiaries as of 2005. As of 2008, the company had five thousand points of sale across eighty countries, with 270 mono-brand Diesel stores. Diesel itself owns 170 of those, with the rest owned by franchisees. Turnover was over €1.3 billion in 2009, and by 2010, the company had over 400 stores. In 2012, Diesel founder Rosso was listed on the Forbes list of billionaires for the first time. In 2015, the company held the exhibition Welcome to Diesel World in Shanghai, which provided an overview of the company's history, in conjunction with its collection debut. Another exhibition was held in Tel Aviv to mark the company's twentieth year in Israel.

In the spring of 2013, Rosso named Nicola Formichetti, the former stylist of Lady Gaga and creative director of Mugler, as Diesel's Artistic Director. The announcement followed days of speculation and was met with positive response across the fashion world and daily news press. In an interview with V magazine following the announcement, Rosso said "I finally met somebody as crazy as I am", and explained that Formichetti's new responsibilities will be overseeing "the total view" of Diesel's brand, including product, communications, marketing and interior design. Formichetti's first project's included launching a groundbreaking crowd-funded advertising campaign with Tumblr. The campaign, titled #Reboot and shot by Inez van Lamsweerde and Vinoodh Matadin, featured prominent, young creatives ranging from graffiti artists to film students instead of common models, with varying body shapes, sizes and personal styles. Diesel USA filed for Chapter 11 bankruptcy protection in March 2019, and announced it would close some of its brick-and-mortar stores. Its parent company, Diesel SpA, was not part of the bankruptcy filing.

=== 2020's ===
Belgian designer Glenn Martens was appointed artistic director of Diesel in October 2020. 2021 direct e-commerce sales for Diesel saw a 34% rise compared to 2019 figures, attributable to Martens work. The Diesel Fall/Winter 2022 Ready-to-Wear fashion show, designed by him and held on 23 February 2022 in Milan, got mostly positive coverage. It was deemed as a "magical and fantastic" show with "big ambitions" and an "out of this world" vibe, while other reviewers appreciated that the "collection’s inspirations spanned decades", although the high-heeled boots proved tricky to walk in, as one model was led off the runway by a member of the technical crew after having repeatedly tripped.

In January 2026, Diesel appointed Andrea Rigogliosi as its new CEO, filling a vacancy that had lasted more than two years. Rigogliosi most recently served as the global head of retail and commercial at Miu Miu.

== Collaborations & partnerships ==
In 2002, Rosso was asked to collaborate with Karl Lagerfeld on a denim collection for the designer's Lagerfeld Gallery. The collection, which was called Lagerfeld Gallery by Diesel, was co-designed by Lagerfeld and then developed by Diesel's Creative Team. It consisted of five pieces that were presented during the designer's catwalk shows during Paris Fashion Week and then sold in very limited editions at the Lagerfeld Galleries Stores in Paris and Monaco, and at the Diesel Denim Galleries in New York City and Tokyo. During the first week of sales in New York, more than 90% of the trousers were sold out, even though prices ranged from as high as $240 to $1840. In a statement after the show in Paris, Rosso said "I am honored to have met this fashion icon of our time. Karl represents creativity, tradition and challenge, and the fact that he thought of Diesel for this collaboration is a great gift and acknowledgement of our reputation as the prêt-à-porter of casual wear."

In 2003, Rosso asked legendary street and graffiti artist Stephen Sprouse to take over Diesel's Union Square store for New York Fashion Week the following September. As part of the collaboration, Sprouse designed a series of limited edition jeans, T-shirts, \and hats, and made a complete makeover of the Diesel store, which meant adding his renowned Day-Glo design to windows, interiors, and outer building exteriors.

Also in 2003, Diesel partnered with video game production company Capcom to create unique costumes for the playable characters in the game Devil May Cry 2.

In 2007, Rosso and Diesel partnered with L'Oréal for the production of Diesel's first fragrance, labelled Fuel For Life. This was followed by a partnership with Italian carmaker FIAT in early 2008 to re-design the classic Fiat 500. Originally one of FIAT's most popular models ever, the new version, simply titled '500 by Diesel', featured several unique design details in the car's interior and exterior and was only produced in 10,000 units.

In the spring of 2008, Rosso launched a collaboration between Diesel and sportswear giant Adidas. After Diesel made a special denim collection for Adidas that was exclusively available at Adidas Originals stores, called Adidas Originals by Diesel, the collaboration then developed into Adidas making special sneakers called Forum Mid Diesel Lea, Forum Mid Diesel Txt, ZX 700 Diesel, Stan Smith Special, Stan Smith 80's Diesel - available in Diesel stores worldwide.

In May 2011, Rosso launched the first ever Diesel bicycle, together with award-winning bicycle manufacturer Pinarello. Built as a single-speed, city bicycle with a hydro formed aluminum frame, the collaboration marked one of the first true collaborations between the bicycle and the fashion industry.

== Fashion lines ==
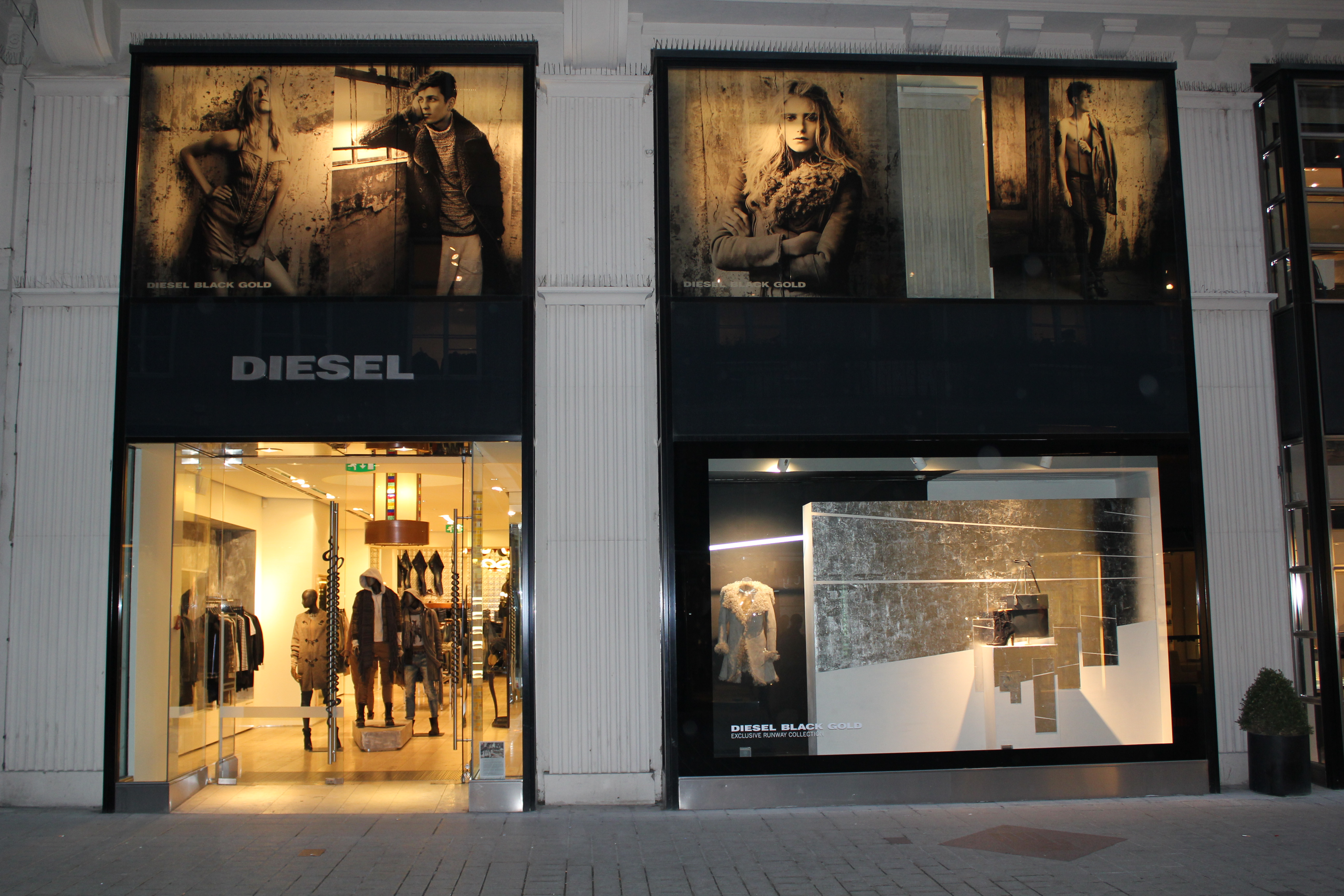
Diesel Black Gold store in Vienna, Austria

While the most popular Diesel apparel item has been denim wear, the company has expanded to include additional forms of clothing. The company has created leather jackets, women's dresses, and other items. In 1998, Diesel founded an offshoot label called Diesel StyleLab, which produced higher end fashion designs beyond more traditional denim jeans. In the 2000s, the company began to license its brand to other retail manufacturers, in order to create new product categories. These lines included the sunglasses line Diesel Eyewear in partnership with Marcolin, the jewels and watches line Diesel Watches in partnership with Fossil, the fragrance line in partnership with L'Oréal. The production of each line involves supervision from Diesel itself. Diesel has also partnered with Moroso, Seletti, Scavolini, Foscarini, and Berti to create a home furnishings line called Diesel Living, with Bugaboo to create strollers, with AVG to create helmets, with Ducati, and with Fiat to create a limited edition Fiat 500. Diesel also produces limited edition lines of jeans.

As of 2003, according to Women's Wear Daily, Diesel had three distinct fashion lines, "Diesel Style Lab, the most pricey fashion-forward designer label; Diesel, a fashion brand that still focuses heavily on denim, and 55DSL, the board sport-inspired streetwear line that blends fashion and function." Style Lab and 55DSL are now defunct.

From 2008 to 2018, there were two lines: Diesel and Diesel Black Gold. Diesel Black Gold was the luxury ready-to-wear line and was launched in 2008 during the New York Fashion Week. The line elevated Diesel's denim expertise by introducing elements of tailoring. Diesel Black Gold was positioned as a casual alternative to other luxury brands. In 2013, Diesel underwent a re-branding effort, reorganizing both the business structure and marketing methodologies.

As of 2023, Diesel does not have any diffusion lines or sub-brands.

== Advertising ==
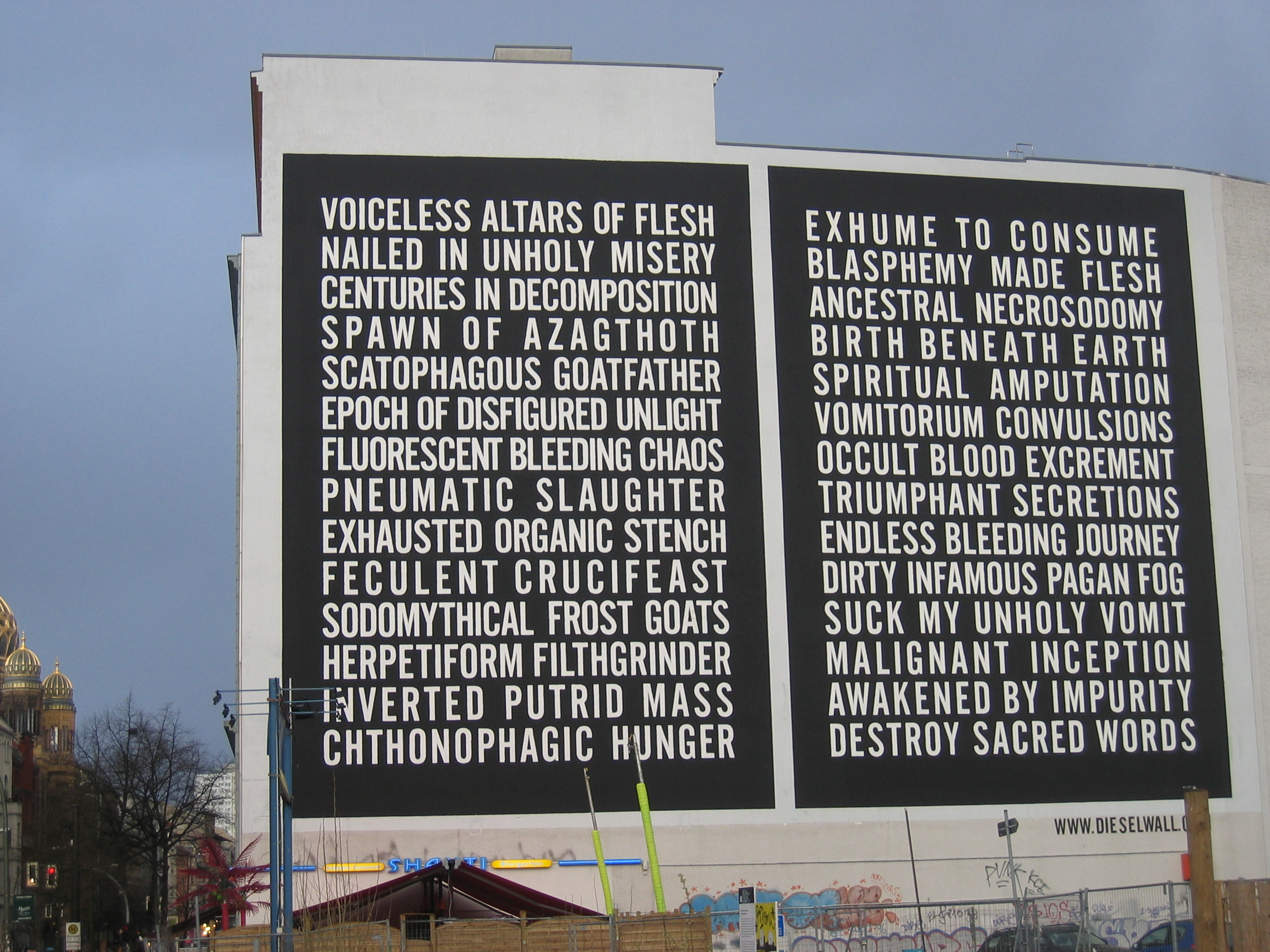
"Dieselwall" in Berlin

Starting in 1991, Diesel has been known for producing ads that invoke surreal images in lieu of direct product details, in partnership with Swedish ad agency Paradiset DDB, Stockholm. These included 1997 ads portraying life in Communist North Korea (shot in Hong Kong). Another ad campaign imitated automobile crashes. Campaigns have also used social consciousness as a theme, ironic plays on global issues (such as their Global Warming Ready campaign featuring post-global warming backdrops in global locations), as well as anti-establishment messages. Michael Chevalier has critiqued the retail stores, stating that he believes that the stores's merchandise is presented in a confusing way in order to get customers to interact with the sales staff. During the late 1990s, Diesel produced CD-ROMs and other computer content, including the computer game "Digital Adrenalin—55DSL".

In the early 2000s, Diesel began to implement a mindset into their global marketing strategy that "put sales and profit second to building something special for customers, often by creating interactive user experiences that are not directly connected to retail, sales, or stores." In a research study of innovative businesses presented by The Times, much of Diesel's successful growth in the early 2000s was accredited to this mindset. The study concluded that "Diesel is an experience which interacts with and entertains its customers with a far deeper relationship than other brands", and that "It is always about engaging with the customer as opposed to selling at them: creating an enjoyable two-way dialogue as opposed to a hollow one-way monologue."

In 2007, Diesel sponsored a music contest, Diesel-U-Music. From January to September 2008, Diesel spent $5.8 million on U.S. advertising, according to TNS Media Intelligence.

This approach took another step, leading to the infamous 'Heidies'. which mocked the phenomenon of reality TV and was one of the first ever campaigns by a fashion brand solely based on the Internet. It featured two models that were locked inside a room and who did whatever the online viewers suggested. The models played two mentally crazy women who, wanting to claim their 15 minutes of fame, had taken an intimate Diesel sales guy as hostage, closed themselves up in a hotel room and hijacked the company's website; requesting that they be selected for the next Diesel advertising campaign. The employee was said to work for Diesel Intimate, as the campaign was in fact the launch for the brand's new line of intimate and beachwear. The campaign became a huge success, and reached over 100,000 views daily while it was live. It was awarded at the Cannes Lions International Advertising Festival that same year.

On October 11, 2008, Diesel celebrated the company's 30th anniversary hosting 17 parties around the world all broadcast live online spanning across 24 hours. Following the opening in Tokyo, the live stream continued to Beijing, Dubai, Athens, Helsinki, Amsterdam, Milan, Zurich, Munich, Paris, Stockholm, Copenhagen, Barcelona, Oslo, London, São Paulo, and finally ended in New York City, with Rosso's attendance. The event featured live performances by Daft Punk, Earth Wind and Fire, 2manydjs, Mark Ronson, New Young Pony Club, and a pregnant MIA who broke her retirement for the occasion. In addition, there were never seen before mash-ups with Chaka Khan feat. Franz Ferdinand and N.E.R.D. feat. Hot Chip.

The event was advertised through the release of a video titled 'Diesel SFW XXX Party Video', which immediately went viral and spread rapidly across the Internet, mostly due to its ironic take on 1980s style pornography. By 2011, it had been viewed more than 20 million times online and classified as one of the most successful viral campaigns ever. Additionally, the anniversary event also featured the production of a limited edition pair of jeans, called 'The Dirty Thirty'. The denim, which were for sale for one day only (on the date of the birth of the brand) at the extremely discounted price of €30 and modeled by Daisy Lowe, caused 'hysteria' and lead consumers to form mile-long lines outside Diesel stores around the world. These jeans were sold out within just a few hours worldwide.

Throughout the 2000s, Rosso and the Diesel Creative Team also continued working with a number of famous photographers and agencies, including Jean Pierre Khazem, Carl de Keyzer, Finlay McKay, Elaine Constantine, Mert Alas & Marcus Piggott, Louis Sebastian Pane, Johan Renck, and Terry Richardson, the latter for the celebrated "Global Warming Ready" campaign of 2007. In 2001, 2007, 2009, and 2010 Diesel was given Grand Prix awards at Cannes Lions International Advertising Festival.

There is a Diesel Art Gallery in Tokyo. In 2009, the head of Diesel's US division, Steve Birkhold, left the company shortly after agreeing a deal to sell cut-priced jeans through Macy's. In 2015 Liam Hemsworth appeared in an ad for Only The Brave. Winnie Harlow also appeared in ads that year as well.

== Talent support ==
In 2001, Diesel:U:Music Radio was founded. Consisting of an independent jury with artists and producers including Ian McCulloch, Mark Ronson, and Ronnie Wood, the jury annually reviewed thousands of demos from around the world and selected winning, unsigned bands. By partnering with record labels, including Warner Music or media publishers including Vice, the winning artists were offered records deals and media publicity. In 2006, the project was broadcast live on Channel 4 in Great Britain and featured legendary avant-garde rock band Roxy Music. In 2009, the project included a global tour and radio station. The tour featured live performances by artists including Kanye West and The Roots,

In 2002, Rosso and Diesel became founding partners of ITS (International Talent Support), a competition for young designers. While Rosso has often been a member of the jury, Diesel and the OTB, its parent company, sponsored the competition financially. In 2005, the founder of i-D Magazine, Terry Jones, credited ITS for "dedicating so much passion and commitment to the selection of designers, like no other organization".

In 2003 and 2004, Diesel began supporting local, young artists through the Diesel New Art and Diesel Wall competitions. Diesel New Art was open to graduating artists working across various media, and would award-winning artists with solo exhibitions, shows at international art fairs, or promotion through internationally published catalogues. For Diesel Wall Diesel purchased large, unused facades in major cities and transformed them into popular exhibition spaces. Winning artworks were selected by an independent jury, and displayed on the walls for a longer period of time throughout the year. During the years a few of the jury members have included curator Hans Ulrich Obrist, film director Bigas Luna, art director and graphic designer Peter Saville, artist Patrick Tuttofuoco, art director Jérôme Sans and editors Helena Kontova and Stefano Boeri.

ANDAM (National Association for the Development of the Fashion Arts) was founded in 1989.

== Trademark dispute ==
In late 1979 or early 1980, an Irish-based company, Montex, began producing jeans bearing the brand Diesel. In 1982, Diesel SpA began selling jeans under its Diesel brand in Ireland.

In 1992, Montex applied to register the Diesel trademark in Ireland. Their application was opposed by Diesel SpA. In 1994, Diesel SpA applied to register the Diesel trademark in Ireland. Their application was opposed by Montex. In 2001, the Irish Supreme Court refused to allow Montex to register the trademark. In 2012, the Irish Controller of Patents Designs and Trademarks refused to allow Diesel SpA to register the trademark. In 2024, the Irish High Court ruled that Diesel SpA was entitled to register the Diesel trademark in Ireland. This decision is open to appeal.
