= George Paine =

George Paine may refer to:

- George Paine (cricketer) (1908–1978), English cricketer
- George Paine (civil servant) (1918–1992), statistician in the British Civil Service
- George Eustis Paine (1920–1991), New York manufacturer and politician
