= Robert Lebel (art critic) =

Robert Lebel (French: [ləbɛl]; January 5, 1901 – February 28, 1986) was a French art historian, specializing in modern French art. He was also an essayist, poet, novelist, and art collector. He wrote the first fundamental essay on Marcel Duchamp and remained close to the artists and poets of Surrealism. Lebel was the friend and advisor of André Breton and close to Max Ernst, Jacques Lacan, André Masson and Claude Lévi-Strauss.

== Biography ==
Lebel was born in Paris, where he would later raise Jean-Jacques Lebel with his wife Nina.

He was exiled to New York City from 1940 to 1944 due to the Second World War, where he and his family lived in Greenwich Village on West 11th Street. During this time, Lebel regularly met with Marcel Duchamp and other artistic intellectuals who had fled Europe for New York. With them, he discovered Native American art.

On his return to Paris, Lebel worked as an expert in classical paintings. In 1950 he launched the magazine "Encyclopaedia Da Costa" with Patrick Waldberg, published by Jean Aubier.

Lebel died in Paris at the age of 85.

== Published works ==
- Courbet. Tenth Anniversary Exhibition, New York, Marie Harriman Gallery, 1940
- Fauvism, New York, Marie Harriman Gallery, 1941
- Mask with a blade, New York, Éditions Hémisphères, 1943
- Leonardo da Vinci or the end of humility, Paris, 1952
- First assessment of current art (s / d Robert Lebel), The Black Sun - Positions n ° 3-4, 1953
- Blackmail of beauty. Small initial conference by André Breton, Paris, Editions de Beaune, coll. "The New Manifestos", 1955
- On Marcel Duchamp, with texts by Marcel Duchamp, André Breton and Henri-Pierre Roché, Paris and London, Éditions du Trianon, 1959.
- Géricault, his monumental ambitions and Italian inspiration, Paris, R. Legueltel, 1961
- Anthology of invented forms. Half a century of sculpture, Paris, Ed. of the Circle Gallery, 1962
- What is art criticism, suppl. to the magazine Preuves, Paris, 1962
- The back of the painting. Morals and customs of the tableauistes, Monaco, Le Rocher, 1964 (only volume I has been published)
- Dorothea Tanning. Recent paintings, small gold sculptures , Paris, Le Point Cardinal, 1966
- Magritte. Paintings, Paris, Fernand Hazan, 1969
- Traite des passions par personne interposée, Paris, Eric Losfeld, coll. "The Mess", 1972
- Dada - Surrealism with Patrick Waldberg & Michel Sanouillet, Paris, ed. Left Bank, 1981
- Marcel Duchamp, Paris, Belfond, 1985
- The Surreal Adventure Around André Breton with José Pierre, Paris, Filipacchi, 1986

=== Fiction ===
- The Double View followed by The Inventor of Free Time, cover illustrated by Alberto Giacometti, with the inset 'The Clock in Profile' by Marcel Duchamp, Paris, The Black Sun, 1964, repr. 1977
- L'Oiseau-caramel, cover illustrated by Max Ernst, with a lithograph of Erró, Paris, Le Soleil Noir, 1969
- Saint-Charlemagne, cover illustrated by Marx Ernst, Paris, The Black Sun, 1976
