= James Paine =

James Paine may refer to:

- James Paine (architect) (1717–1789), English architect
- James Paine (rower), English rower
- James Paine (sculptor) (1745–1829), English sculptor and architect
- James Carriger Paine (1924–2010), American judge

== See also ==
- James Pain (1779–1877), English architect
- James Payn (1830–1898), English novelist
- James Payne (disambiguation)
- Paine (surname)
