= Suffer (disambiguation) =

Suffer may refer to suffering.

Suffer may also refer to:

== Music ==
- Suffer (album), by Bad Religion
- "Suffer", a song by Charlie Puth from his album Nine Track Mind
- "Suffer", a song by Grace Jones from her album Muse
- "Suffer", a song by Staind from their album Break The Cycle
- "Suffer", a song by Stone Sour from Come What(ever) May
- "Suffer", a song by Suicide Silence from their album No Time to Bleed
- "Suffer", a song by The Smashing Pumpkins from their album Gish
- "Suffer", a song by The Smith Street Band from their album More Scared of You Than You Are of Me

== Other uses ==
- Allow, a synonym for suffer, as in, "Suffer the children to come unto me"
- Endurance, sufferance

== See also ==
- Suffrage
- The Suffering (disambiguation)
