= Stephen Payne =

Stephen Payne may refer to:

- Stephen Payne (energy executive) (born 1964), American lobbyist
- Stephen Payne (naval architect), British ship designer
- Stephen Payne, science fiction editor at Starburst magazine, Visual Imagination and the Doctor Who Appreciation Society
- Stephen Payne (soccer) (born 1997), American soccer player
- Stephen Payne (author), writer of westerns for Ace Books, see List of Ace western double titles
- Stephen Payne (Scottish footballer) (born 1983), Scottish footballer, see 2002–03 Aberdeen F.C. season
- Stephen Payne-Gallwey (18th century), member of the English Society of Dilettanti

== See also ==
- Steve Payne (disambiguation)
