= Payen =

Payen may refer to:

== People ==
- Anselme Payen (1795–1878), French chemist
- Antoine Payen the Younger (1792–1853), Belgian painter, naturalist and collector
- Antoine Payen the Elder (1748–1798), Belgian architect
- Antoine Payen (animator) (1902–1985), French animator
- Louis Payen (real name Albert Liénard, 1875–1927), French librettist
- Nicolas Payen (also Nicolas Colin, c. 1512–1559), Franco-Flemish composer and choirmaster
- Nicolas Roland Payen (1914–2004), French aeronautical engineer, including a list of 'Payen' aircraft
- Pierre Payen (1914–2004), French editorial cartoonist and caricaturist
- Payen Talu (born 1951), Taiwanese politician

== Other uses ==
- Payén (also known as Reserva Provincial La Payunia), a natural reserve in Argentina

== See also ==
- Hugues de Payens (c. 1070–1136), co-founder and first Grand Master of the Knights Templar
- Pascal Payen-Appenzeller (born 1944), Franco-Swiss historian, poet and writer
