= Henry Payne (engineer) =

Henry Payne FRAeS M.Inst.C.E.
- Born: 9 March 1871; Calcutta, India
- Died: 28 March 1945 (aged 74); Richmond, Victoria, Australia
- Education: Bedford Modern School
- Alma mater: City and Guilds’ Technical College, Finsbury, London
- Known for: Mechanical Engineering
- Spouse: Charlotte Wilson
- Scientific career
- Institutions: University of Cape Town; University of Melbourne

Henry Payne FRAeS M.Inst.C.E. (9 March 1871 – 28 March 1945) was dean of the Faculty of Mechanical Engineering at the University of Melbourne. He was also the first occupant of the Corporation Chair of Engineering, South African College, Cape Town (1903-1905) where he designed and equipped the Civil and Mechanical Engineering Departments. Payne's entry in the Dictionary of National Biography describes him as 'Dignified in manner and precise in speech, he was respected as a man of principle'.

== Early life ==
Payne was born on 9 March 1871 in Calcutta, India, the son of Revd. James Payne of the London Missionary Society and his wife Charlotte (née Stephens). He was educated at Bedford Modern School and the City and Guilds’ Technical College, Finsbury, London. Payne received his practical training with Merryweather & Co. Ltd of Greenwich.

== Career ==
Payne was appointed a lecturer in engineering and applied mathematics at University College London in 1898 and to membership of the Institution of Civil Engineers and the Institution of Mechanical Engineers in 1900. He left University College London in 1902 to become the first occupant of the Corporation Chair of Engineering, South African College, Cape Town (1903–1905), where he designed and equipped the Civil and Mechanical Engineering Departments. He later organised and carried out large extensions to the Engineering School of the University of Melbourne, where he was Professor of Engineering.

== Family life ==
Payne, a ‘devoutly religious man’, took an active role in the Independent Church, Collins Street and supported the Student Christian Movement bequeathing several acres of land from his property at Healesville where ‘he indulged his love of the Australian bush in vacations and in retirement’.

On 5 April 1900, Payne married Charlotte Wilson Thompson at the Congregational Church, Lewisham. They had no children. Payne died in Richmond, Victoria, Australia on 28 March 1945.
