= Quentin Pain =

Quentin Pain FIOEE FIAB (born 1956) is a published author, speaker, and entrepreneur.

== Biography ==
Pain was a founding member of Accountz.com Ltd (a British software company)

Pain wrote Prophet, which won the Acorn User Best Business software Award for 1995 and 1996. This was used to help launch the Acorn A4000 in New Zealand. Pain is also the author of the book Accounting For Everyone, which was notable as the first book to change the way people think about double-entry and provides the online course Accounting For Everyone. The core changes to double-entry described in the book are:

1. The replacement of the terms credit and debit with the terms from and to
2. Entering the credited or debited account in the credit or debit columns (as opposed to the amount)
3. Reversing the order of those columns

These changes aim to simplify the double-entry process.

Pain, together with co-authors David Bradforth and John Taylor, wrote the book Home Accountz for Dummies for the American publishers John Wiley & Sons. Pain self-published his first book on business principles, entitled Legendary, in October 2015 through publishers CreateSpace. Pain wrote and self-published the book Step by Step Marketing in 2013, which tells the story of how he grew Accountz.com Ltd.

Pain has appeared in numerous publications, including The Independent, The Sunday Times, MoneyWeek, and the Financial Times.

Pain was named among the top 10 business advisors in the UK in 2015 by a panel of judges, including Emma Jones MBE and the Department for Business, Innovation and Skills. He was nominated for the International Association of Book-keepers Small Business Mentor of the Year award, and won the award on 21 June 2013.
