= Lynn S. Paine =

American economist

Lynn S. Paine is currently a Baker Foundation Professor and John G. McLean Professor of Business Administration, Emerita, at Harvard Business School. Her research interests are company ethical and financial leadership and corporate governance, focusing on how companies can maintain high ethical standards while achieving outstanding financial results.

Paine's latest book is Capitalism at Risk, Updated and Expanded: How Business Can Lead (HBR Press, 2020), with HBS colleagues Joe Bower and Dutch Leonard. Her text and casebook Cases in Leadership, Ethics, and Organizational Integrity: A Strategic Perspective came out in 1996. Library Journal named her book Value Shift: Why Companies Must Merge Social and Financial Imperatives to Achieve Superior Performance (McGraw Hill, 2003) one of that year’s best business books. Her recent publications also include "Covid-19 Is Rewriting the Rules of Corporate Governance," "A Guide to the Big Ideas and Debates in Corporate Governance," "CEOs Say Their Aim Is Inclusive Prosperity. Do They Mean It?," “The Error at the Heart of Corporate Leadership,” and “Sustainability in the Boardroom" — all published in the Harvard Business Review. She has written more than 200 cases taught at HBS and other business schools.

Former chair of the General Management unit at HBS, Paine has served as Senior Associate Dean for International Development, Senior Associate Dean for Faculty Development, and chair of the School’s required course on Leadership and Corporate Accountability, which she co-founded. She currently teaches Corporate Governance and Boards of Directors in the MBA program and co-chairs the School’s executive programs on corporate governance, including Making Corporate Boards More Effective, Women on Boards, Preparing to Be a Corporate Director, Accelerating Board Diversity, and the Advanced Corporate Director Seminar.
