= SS John Barton Payne =

World War II Liberty ship

History

United States
- Name: John Barton Payne
- Namesake: John Barton Payne
- Owner: War Shipping Administration (WSA)
- Operator: Isthmian Steamship Co.
- Ordered: as type (Z-EC2-S-C2) hull, MC hull 1535
- Builder: J.A. Jones Construction, Panama City, Florida
- Cost: $1,862,684
- Yard number: 17
- Way number: 5
- Laid down: 11 August 1943
- Launched: 23 October 1943
- Completed: 30 November 1943
- Identification: Call Signal: KYLV
- Fate: Laid up in National Defense Reserve Fleet, Mobile, Alabama, 21 November 1947; Sold for scrapping, 28 October 1971

General characteristics
- Class & type: type Z-EC2-S-C2, army tank transport
- Tonnage: 10,865 LT DWT; 7,176 GRT
- Displacement: 3,380 long tons (3,434 t) (light); 14,245 long tons (14,474 t) (max)
- Length: 441 feet 6 inches (135 m) oa; 416 feet (127 m) pp; 427 feet (130 m) lwl
- Beam: 57 feet (17 m)
- Draft: 27 ft 9.25 in (8.4646 m)
- Installed power: 2 × Oil fired 450 °F (232 °C) boilers, operating at 220 psi (1,500 kPa); 2,500 hp (1,900 kW)
- Propulsion: 1 × triple-expansion steam engine, (manufactured by Filer and Stowell, Milwaukee, Wisconsin); 1 × screw propeller
- Speed: 11.5 knots (21.3 km/h; 13.2 mph)
- Capacity: 562,608 cubic feet (15,931 m^{3}) (grain); 499,573 cubic feet (14,146 m^{3}) (bale)
- Complement: 38–62 USMM; 21–40 USNAG
- Armament: Varied by ship; Bow-mounted 3-inch (76 mm)/50-caliber gun; Stern-mounted 4-inch (102 mm)/50-caliber gun; 2–8 × single 20-millimeter (0.79 in) Oerlikon anti-aircraft (AA) cannons and/or, 2–8 × 37-millimeter (1.46 in) M1 AA guns

SS John Barton Payne was a Liberty ship built in the United States during World War II. She was named after John Barton Payne, the counsel for the Emergency Fleet Corporation during World War I, Chairman of the U.S. Shipping Board from 1919 until February 1920, and the United States Secretary of the Interior under Woodrow Wilson.

== Construction ==
John Barton Payne was laid down on 11 August 1943, under a United States Maritime Commission (MARCOM) contract, MC hull 1535, by J.A. Jones Construction, Panama City, Florida; she was launched on 23 October 1943.

== History ==
She was allocated to Isthmian Steamship Co., on 30 November 1943. On 21 November 1947, she was laid up in the National Defense Reserve Fleet, in Mobile, Alabama. On 28 October 1971, she was sold, along with 13 other ships, for $513,800, to Union Minerals and Alloys Corporation, to be scrapped. She was removed from the fleet on 22 February 1972.

== Bibliography ==
- "Jones Construction, Panama City FL". ShipbuildingHistory.com. 13 October 2010.
- Maritime Administration. "John Barton Payne". Ship History Database Vessel Status Card. U.S. Department of Transportation, Maritime Administration.
- "Liberty Ships – World War II".
- Davies, James (May 2004). "Specifications (As-Built)" (PDF). p. 23.
- "SS John Barton Payne".
