= Payne Creek =

Payne Creek may refer to:

- Payne Creek (Antarctica), a cove in South Georgia
- Payne Creek (Florida), a stream in Hardee and Polk counties
