= Karen W. Pane =

American politician

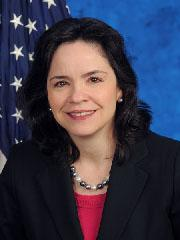

Assistant Secretary of the United States Department of Veterans Affairs
- President: Barack Obama
- Vice President: Joe Biden

Personal details
- Education: University of Florida; University of San Francisco
- Profession: Administrator; Nurse

Karen W. Pane is the former Assistant Secretary for Policy and Planning at the Department of Veterans Affairs. Before her last position, she served as the Director of the Office of Performance Monitoring, Center for Program Planning and Results at the United States Department of Labor.

== Early life ==
Pane is a native Floridian, and she attended the University of Florida for her bachelor's degree in nursing. She also attended the University of San Francisco and received a master's degree in public affairs. Additionally, Pane served in the United States Navy Reserve Nurse Corps.
