= Ernie Payne =

Australian rules footballer

Personal information
- Full name: Ernest Edward Payne
- Born: 29 April 1934
- Died: 18 March 2010 (aged 75)
- Original team: Lexton
- Height: 173 cm (5 ft 8 in)
- Weight: 77 kg (170 lb)

Playing career^{1}
Years	Club	Games (Goals)
1954	South Melbourne	3 (1)
- ^{1} Playing statistics correct to the end of 1954.

Ernest Edward Payne (29 April 1934 – 18 March 2010) was an Australian rules footballer who played with South Melbourne in the Victorian Football League (VFL).
