= James L. Payne =

American social scientist

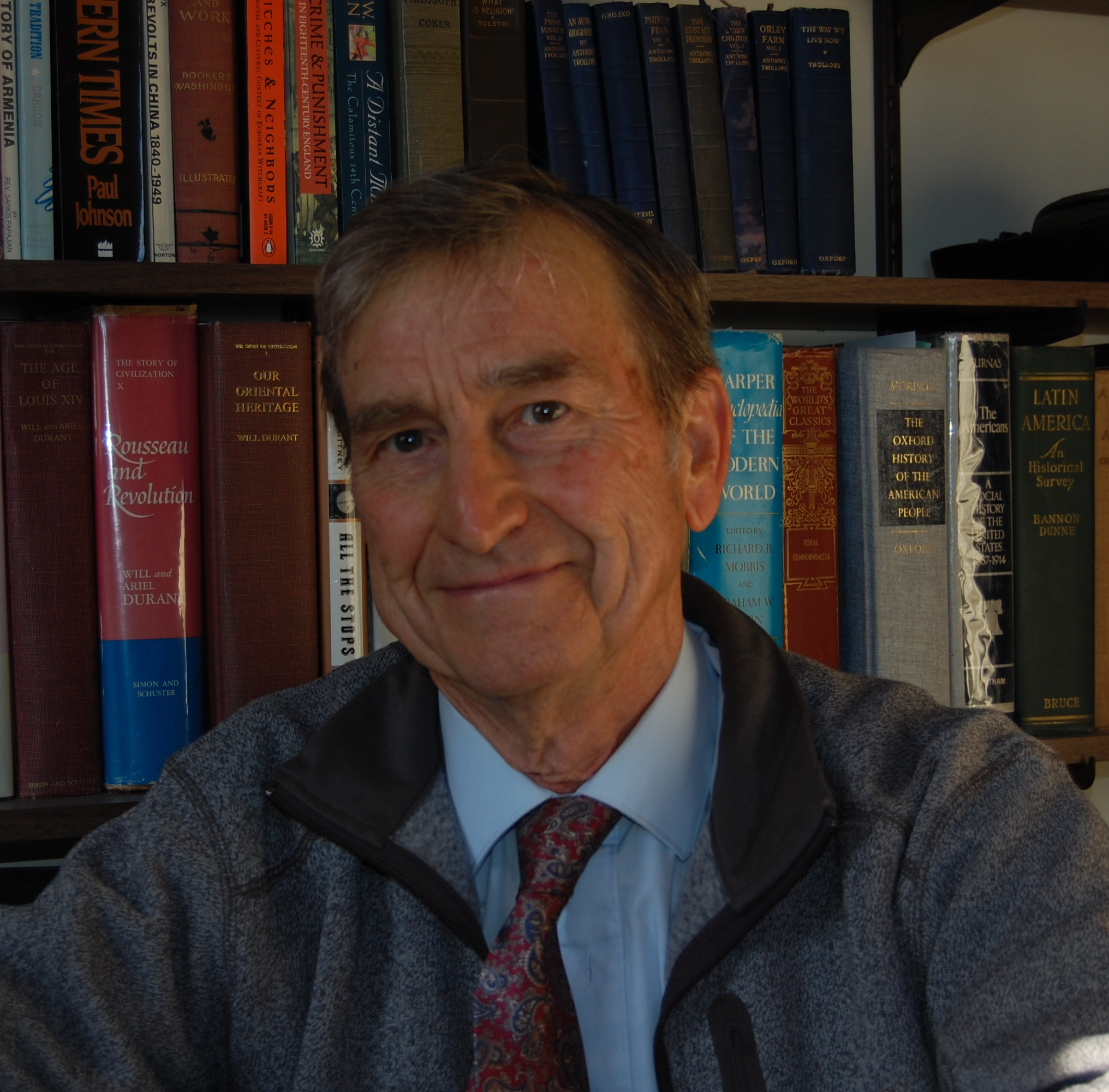
- Born: June 17, 1939 (age 86)

Academic background
- Alma mater: University of California, Berkeley, Oberlin College

Academic work
- Discipline: political science, political philosophy, political economy

James L. Payne (born 1939) is an American social scientist writing on political science, economics, social science methodology, foreign policy, and political philosophy. After teaching political science at the university level for 20 years, he left academia to conduct research and writing as an independent scholar.

== Education ==
After studying as an undergraduate at Oberlin College, Payne went on to study political science from the University of California, Berkeley, earning his Ph.D. in 1968.

== Academic career ==
Payne has taught political science at Texas A&M University, as well as at Yale University, Wesleyan University, and Johns Hopkins University. From 1986 to 1988, Payne held the position of visiting scholar at Bowling Green State University, and in 1996 he was named a Bradley Fellow at The Heritage Foundation in Washington D.C.

Payne's work as a young scholar on politics in Colombia was criticized by economist Albert O. Hirschman for overly relying on quantitative methods.

In 1985, Payne retired from academic tenure to study independently as the Director of Lytton Research and Analysis in Sandpoint, Idaho. He currently holds this position.

== Research and Views ==
In his 2004 book, A History of Force, Payne argues that the global reduction in violence is due to increased economic prosperity, as well as improved communication and access to information. Payne also argues that since government relies on the use of force, the reduction in force corresponds to a growing irreverence for government institutions and politicians.

== Books ==
- Labor and Politics in Peru; The System of Political Bargaining (Yale University Press, 1965)
- Patterns of Conflict in Colombia (Yale University Press, 1968)
- Incentive Theory and Political Process; Motivation and Leadership in the Dominican Republic (Lexington Books, 1972)
- The Culture of Spending; Why Congress Lives Beyond Our Means (San Francisco: Institute for Contemporary Studies, 1991)
- Overcoming Welfare; Expecting More from the Poor--And from Ourselves (Basic Books, 1998)
- A History of Force; Exploring the Worldwide Movement against Habits of Coercion, Bloodshed, and Mayhem (Lytton Publishing, 2004)
- Six Political Illusions; A Primer on Government for Idealists Fed Up with History Repeating Itself (Lytton, Publishing 2010)
- The Big Government We Love to Hate (Lytton Publishing, 2021)
