= John Payne (Australian footballer) =

Australian rules footballer

Personal information
- Full name: John Payne
- Born: 2 June 1950 (age 76)
- Original team: Kerang
- Height: 182 cm (6 ft 0 in)
- Weight: 86 kg (190 lb)

Playing career^{1}
| Years | Club | Games (Goals) |
| 1971 | South Melbourne | 1 (0) |
- ^{1} Playing statistics correct to the end of 1971.

John Payne (born 2 June 1950) is a former Australian rules footballer who played with South Melbourne in the Victorian Football League (VFL).
