= Harriet Evans Paine =

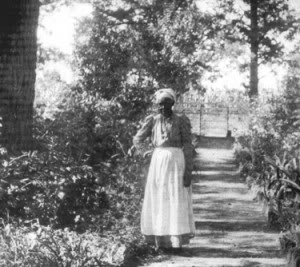
Harriet Evans Paine

Harriet Evans Paine (c. 1822–1917) was a Texas storyteller and oral historian. She was born a slave and was also known as "Aunt Harriet."

== Biography ==
Paine was born as a slave to Jim and Rebecca Evans in Tennessee, around the year 1822. They were owned by Swan and Jerusha Hardin. The Hardins followed their sons to Texas in 1828. In Texas, Paine was the "thimble girl," threading needles for Jerusha's mother. In 1834 she became a servant in Benjamin Franklin Hardin's home. Hardin lived on a plantation outside of Liberty.

Paine participated in the Runaway Scrape; and during 1836 and 1837, served Mexican officers captured at the Battle of San Jacinto and housed at William Hardin's plantation. It is said that she treated the prisoners kindly.

In 1839, she moved with Franklin's family to Seven Pines, a house within the town of Liberty.

Paine had children with two other slaves, Henry Rowe and Mr. Green. Her children were named Henry Rowe Jr. and Calvin and Melinda Green. It is unknown what happened to all of her children and no marriages were recorded, although it was noted that she was "not allowed to live with her husband." She also lived with her children behind the main house.

After Juneteenth, 1865, when slaves were freed, Paine continued to work for the Hardins, most likely having "signed a Freedmen's contract with Franklin Hardin." She worked at Seven Pines until 1916, when there was a fire that nearly destroyed the house. Paine rescued the Hardin family's letters and documents. Paine died in 1917.

Her stories and oral histories have been preserved by the Hardin family and are housed in the Hardin Collection at the Sam Houston Regional Library and Research Center.
