= Justice Paine =

Justice Paine may refer to:

- Bayard H. Paine (1872–1955), associate justice of the Nebraska Supreme Court
- Byron Paine (1827–1871), associate justice of the Wisconsin Supreme Court
- Elijah Paine (1757–1842), associate justice of the Vermont Supreme Court
- Robert Treat Paine (1731–1814), associate justice of the Massachusetts Supreme Judicial Court

== See also ==
- Justice Pain (1978–2020), American professional wrestler
- Elisha Payne (1731–1807), chief justice of the Supreme Court of Vermont
- Judge Payne (disambiguation)
