= Kevin Payne =

Kevin Payne may refer to:

- Kevin Payne (American football) (born 1983), American football player
- Kevin Payne (soccer) (1953–2022), American soccer executive
- Kevin Payne (politician), American politician, member of the Arizona House of Representatives

== See also ==
- Kevin Paine or Keith Lee (born 1984), American professional wrestler
