= George Paine (civil servant) =

British civil servant

- Born: 14 April 1918; East Sutton, Kent, England
- Died: 2 March 1992 (aged 73); Swindon, Wiltshire, England
- Other names: Toby
- Occupation: Statistician
- Known for: Registrar General

George Paine CB DFC (14 April 1918 – 2 March 1992) (known as "Toby") was a statistician in the British Civil Service. He rose to become Director of Statistics and Intelligence at the Inland Revenue, Registrar General of England and Wales, and Director of Office of Population Censuses and Surveys from November 1972.

He was born in Kent and was schooled at home, Ovingdean Hall School and Bradfield College before attending Peterhouse, Cambridge. He navigated in De Havilland Mosquitos during World War II and earned a DFC. He took early retirement in 1978. to farm in Wiltshire.

== Honours and awards ==
- 19 September 1944 – Flying Office Robert Lyle James Barbour (125456), RAFVR, 264 Sqn. Flying Officer George Paine (129167), RAFVR, 264 Sqn. Have been awarded the Distinguished Flying Cross (DFC) – These officers have completed very many sorties as pilot and observer respectively. They have displayed great skill and co-operation and have destroyed 3 enemy aircraft at night. Their keenness and devotion to duty have been most commendable.
- 15 June 1974 – George Paine, DFC, Director of the Office of Population Censuses and Surveys and Registrar General of England and Wales is appointed a Companion of the Order of the Bath
