= John Paine =

John Paine may refer to:

- John Paine (sport shooter) (1870–1951), American shooter, competed at the 1896 Olympics
- John Paine (cricketer) (1829–1859), English cricketer
- John Paine (weightlifter), British Olympic weightlifter
- John Alsop Paine (1840–1912), American botanist and Presbyterian minister
- John Knowles Paine (1839–1906), American composer
- John Rowlett Paine, mayor of Memphis, Tennessee
- Saint John Paine (1532–1582), English Catholic priest and martyr
- John Paine (North Carolina politician), 18th-century politician

== See also ==
- John Payne (disambiguation)
