= Jack Payne =

Jack Payne may refer to:

- Jack Payne (Australian rules footballer) (born 1999), Australian footballer for Brisbane Lions
- Jack Payne (bandleader) (1899–1969), British dance music bandleader
- Jack Payne (footballer, born 1991), English footballer for Boreham Wood
- Jack Payne (footballer, born 1994), English footballer for Colchester United
- Jack Payne (rugby union) (born 1994), Australian-Welsh rugby union player

== See also ==
- Jackson Paine (born 1993), Australian rules footballer
- John Payne (disambiguation)
