= Gareth Payne =

Wales international rugby union footballer

- Born: Gareth Webb Payne; 8 September 1935 Trelewis, Merthyr Tydfil County Borough, Wales
- Died: 2 July 2004 (aged 68) Lake District, England
- School: Pontypridd Grammar School

Rugby union career
- Position: Lock
Amateur team(s)
Years	Team	Apps	(Points)
1954–1964	Pontypridd RFC		
–	London Welsh RFC		
–	Army		
–	Barbarian F.C.		
–	Glamorgan County RFC		
–	Gloucestershire		
–	Hampshire		
International career
Years	Team	Apps	(Points)
1960	Wales	3	(0)

Gareth Webb Payne (8 September 1935 – 2 July 2004) was an international rugby union player. He played club rugby for Pontypridd RFC and after joining the Royal Engineers he also represented the Army.
