= Tim Payne =

Tim Payne may refer to:

- Tim Payne (footballer) (born 1994), New Zealand footballer
- Tim Payne (rugby union) (born 1979), English rugby player
- Tim Payne, musician with Thursday

== See also ==
- Tim Paine (born 1984), Australian cricketer
