= Pain, Kerman =

Pain پائين
- Village
- Location within Iran
- Coordinates: 29°02′03″N 57°42′36″E
- Country: Iran
- Province: Kerman
- County: Jiroft
- Bakhsh: Sarduiyeh
- Rural District: Gevar

Population (2006)
  - Total: 14
- Time zone: UTC+3:30 (IRST)
  - Summer (DST): UTC+4:30 (IRDT)

Pain (Persian: پائين, also Romanized as Pā’īn) is a village in Gevar Rural District, Sarduiyeh District, Jiroft County, Kerman Province, Iran. At the 2006 census, its population was 14, in 4 families.
