= Harry Payne =

Harry Payne may refer to:

- Harry Payne (artist) (1858–1927), English military artist
- Harry Payne (athlete) (1892–1969), English marathoner
- Harry Payne (politician) (born 1952), American politician
- Harry Payne (rugby union) (1907–2000), Welsh international rugby player
- Harry D. Payne (1891–1987), St. Louis architect most notable for Houston-area structures
- Harry Vearle Payne (1908–1984), U.S. federal judge
- Harry C. Payne, 14th president of Williams College
- Harry Payne of the Payne Brothers, pantomime act

== See also ==
- Henry Payne (disambiguation)
- Harold Payne (disambiguation)
