= Steve Payne =

Steve Payne may refer to:

- Steve Payne (footballer) (born 1975), English footballer
- Steve Payne (ice hockey) (born 1958), ice hockey left winger
- Steve Payne (basketball) (born 1968), American college basketball coach

== See also ==
- Stephen Payne (disambiguation)
