= Rosanna Catherine Payne =

American businesswomen, teacher, and politician

Rosanna Catherine Payne (née Stark; March 19, 1884 – October 31, 1954) was an American businesswomen, teacher, and politician.

Born in Harris, Minnesota, Payne went to the Harris public schools and to Caton Business College. She was involved with the general mercantile and real estate/loan businesses in Ball Club, Minnesota. Harris also owned a farm and was a teacher. Harris served as postmistress for Ball Club, Minnesota. From 1927 to 1932, Payne served in the Minnesota House of Representatives and was a Democrat. Payne died at her home in Minneapolis, Minnesota.
