= James Payne (cricketer) =

English cricketer

James Payne was an English cricketer who played for Lancashire. He made one first-class appearance during the 1898 season, and at least four appearances for the Lancashire Second XI in the same year.

Payne was a lower-middle order batsman for the Second XI who played his only first-class match in the tailend. However, he failed to score a run during the match, being caught twice off the bowling of onetime English Test bowler Fred Tate.
