= François Pain =

French filmmaker

François Pain is a filmmaker based in Paris, known for his specializing in films related to experiments in alternative psychiatry.

== Life and work ==
François Pain is cofounder of the Federation of NonCommercial Free Radios and Radio Tomato and co-produced Unchained Channel (1991) and Chaosmédia (1994).

Pain began his interest in alternative psychiatry when he worked with Félix Guattari in the private clinic of La Borde. Based on this experience of linguistics, schizoanalyse, antipsychiatry and social revolution, he produced the 90-minute-long Monument à Félix Guattari, le film in 1991 in collaboration with Jean-Jacques Lebel. In 1994 the film was installed as part of a large assemblage entitled Monument à Félix Guattari in the Forum of the Centre Pompidou.
