= Payne =

Payne may refer to:

== People ==
- Payne (surname)
- Cecilia Payne, a British-American astronomer

== Organisations ==
- Payne (company)

== Places ==
United States

- Payne, Georgia
- Payne, Ohio
- Payne County, Oklahoma
- Payne's Prairie, Florida
- Fort Payne, Alabama

Elsewhere

- Payne Creek (disambiguation)
- Payne Bluff above Sandon, British Columbia on the Kaslo and Slocan Railway
- Payns France

== Entertainment ==
- Major Payne, 1995 film
- Martin Payne, main character in the Martin TV series
- Max Payne (series), a video game series
  - Max Payne (video game), the first game in the series
  - Max Payne (character), the series' eponymous character
  - Max Payne (film), 2008 film based on the series
- Payne (TV series), 1999 US TV show patterned after Fawlty Towers
- Payne, a boss in the 2010 first-person action game Red Steel 2

== Other uses ==
- Payne Arena, an arena in Hidalgo, Texas
- The Payne effect, the name of a particular feature of the stress-strain response of filled rubber
- The Arnaud River, formerly "Payne River", in Nunavik, Canada
- Payne rearrangement, isomerization reaction

== See also ==
- Paine (disambiguation)
