= Luigi Pane =

Italian filmographer (born 1977)

Louis Sebastian Pane
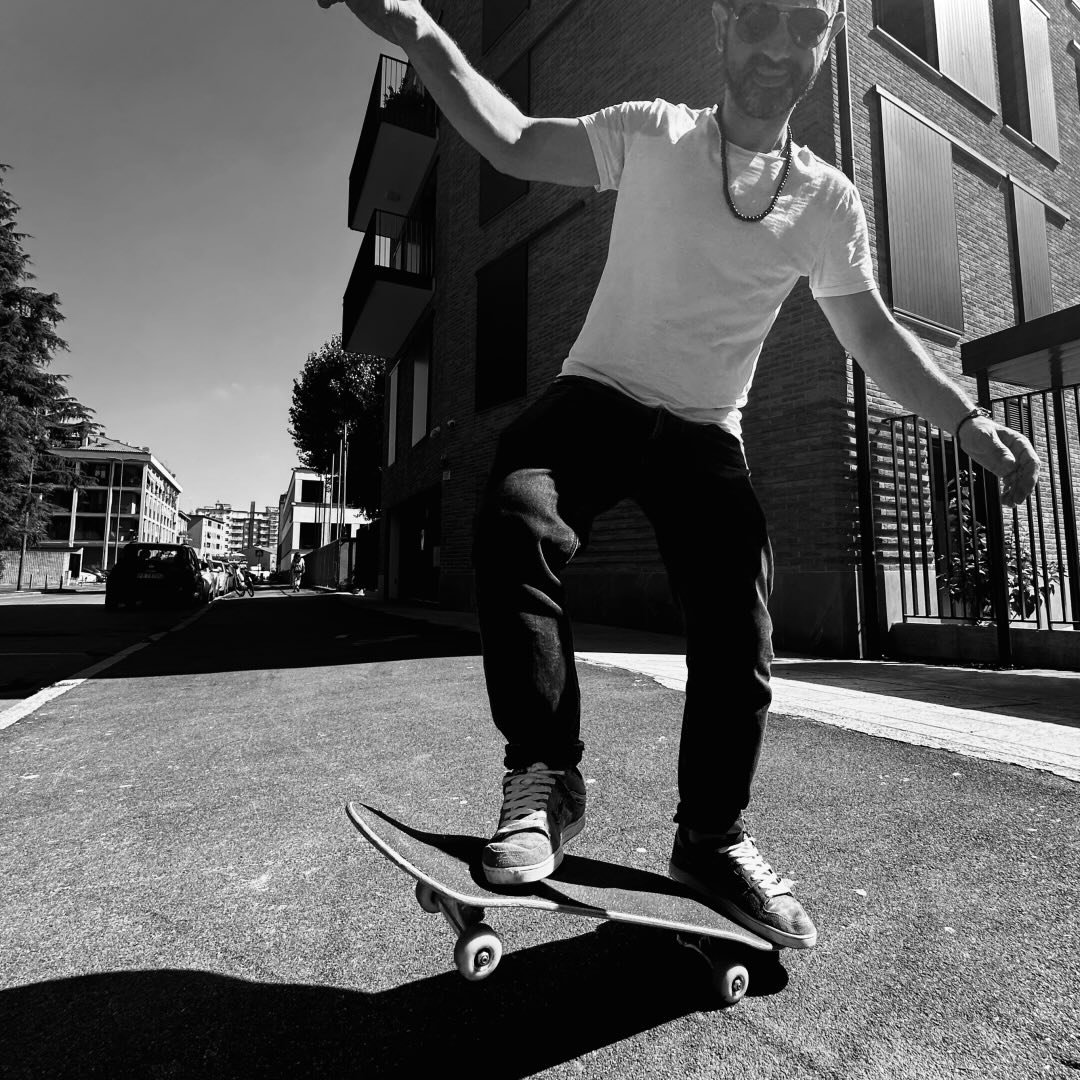
- Louis Sebastian Pane in Milan, 2024.
- Born: Luigi Pane; 12 March 1977 (age 48); Naples, Italy
- Occupations: director; video artist
- Website: vimeo.com/abstractgroove

Luigi Pane, also known as Louis Sebastian Pane (born March 12, 1977, in Naples), is an Italian director and video artist.

He is the founder and creative director of abstract groove (also known as abstr^ct:groove), an independent creative production studio and filmmaking collective based in Milan, Italy.

== Early life ==
Luigi Pane grew up in Ercolano, in the south of Italy. After attending art school in Naples he moved to Milan for studying design at Politecnico. During the university years he started to experiment with music and video making. Right after the university years he wrote and directed projects for fashion brands like Diesel, Dolce&Gabbana, Pirelli, Ray-Ban and Persol.

In 2004, together with Giada Risso, Luigi founded abstr^ct:groove and his work started to get noticed, year after year, by the creative and advertising international community. In 2008 he won the Epica d'Or at Epica Awards with the short film for Diesel "Explorers of the Past and Future".

Other commercials he directed include Yamaha "The Dark Side of Japan", Freddy "Kaleidoscope", Alfa Romeo Stelvio "Whoa There!", W Eyewear "Life is a Parade", Chrysler "The Performer" and GMC "Mighty Spirit".

His project "Building Urban Motion" was awarded in 2009 at Milan International Film Festival. "Vesuvius Bunks", which he wrote and directed for Franky B aka Cryptic Monkey, was awarded at PIVI 2012 and at London International Awards 2013.

As a visual artist he exhibited in April 2013 at Palais De Tokyo in Paris together with Federico Pepe for the project Le Dictateur.

His work has been featured on: Shots, Juxtapoz, IDN, Creative Review, Fubiz and The Creators Project.

== Awards ==
- 2008 awarded with Epica d'Or at Epica Awards with the short film for Diesel Explorers of the Past and Future
- 2009 Milan International Film Festival, Special Jury Gold Prize for the video installation project "Building Urban Motion"
- 2012 Winner of Best Cinematography at PIVI Awards for "Vesuvius Bunks", Franky B ft. James Senese
- 2015 Dubai Lynx Awards. Gold Prize for Chrysler "The Performer" campaign
- 2016 Byron Bay Film Festival. Gold Prize, Best Experimental Film for the short film Sculptures that Lost the Sense of Time
- 2017 ADCI Awards. Gold Prize as Best Director for Alfa Romeo Stelvio "Whoa There!"
- 2023 ABBY Awards. Silver for Best Use Of Music. AM/NS India "Jharoka" TV, cinema commercial.

== Aesthetics and style ==
The style and aesthetic of Louis Sebastian Pane are characterised by a fusion between visual art, music, animated movie, with stylistic traces distilled from art films, but also as a live action style. The result of this blend is a mode of original vision and his direction ranging from video installations to video clips, from commercials and shorts, real works of art that highlight a rigorous style but always open to new paradigms and visual space.

== Filmography ==
Short films

Sculptures that Lost the Sense of Time (2015)

Commercials

1. Freddy: "Kaleidoscope"
2. Yamaha: "The Dark Side of Japan"
3. Alfa Romeo Stelvio: "Whoa There!"
4. Yamaha: "Ray of Darkness"
5. GMC: "Mighty Spirit"
6. Red Bull Mobile: "Data Makes The World Go Around"
7. Cadillac: "Fashionably Early"
8. Alfa Romeo: "Animals"
9. Yamaha: "We R1"
10. Chrysler: "The Performer"
11. Audi: "A Tribute to Boxing"
12. Web Eyewear: "Life is a Parade"
13. Diesel: "Explorers of the Past and Future"
14. AM/NS: "Reimagineering India"

Music videos

1. "Vesuvius Bunks" by Franky B aka Cryptic Monkey ft. James Senese
2. "Napoli Anthem" by Nevrotype

Video installations

1. Building Urban Motion (2009)
2. Pure Abstract Cinema (2010)
