= Donald Payne =

Donald Payne may refer to:

== Arts and entertainment ==
- Donald G. Payne (1924–2018), English author
- Don Payne (writer) (1964–2013), American writer and producer
- Don Payne (musician) (1933–2017), American jazz bassist

== Government and military ==
- Donald M. Payne (1934–2012), U.S. Representative from New Jersey, father of Donald Payne, Jr.
- Donald Payne Jr. (1958–2024), U.S. Representative from New Jersey, son of Donald M. Payne
- Donald Payne (British Army soldier) (born 1970), British soldier who became his country's first convicted war criminal during his tour in Iraq

== Others ==
- Donald Payne (American football) (born 1994), American football player
- Don Payne (sprinter) (born 1944), American sprinter, winner of the 1966 400 meters at the NCAA Division I Indoor Track and Field Championships
