= John Paine (cricketer) =

English cricketer

Personal information
- Full name: John Gosling Paine
- Born: 10 November 1829; Brighton, Sussex, England
- Died: 1 November 1859 (aged 29); Brighton, Sussex, England
- Batting: Right-handed
- Role: Wicket-keeper

Domestic team information
- Years: Team
- 1855: Marylebone Cricket Club
- 1851–1859: Sussex

Career statistics
Competition	First-class
Matches	13
Runs scored	224
Batting average	11.20
100s/50s	–/–
Top score	47
Balls bowled	–
Wickets	–
Bowling average	–
5 wickets in innings	–
10 wickets in match	–
Best bowling	–
Catches/stumpings	7/3
- Source: Cricinfo, 15 July 2012

John Gosling Paine (10 November 1829 – 1 November 1859) was an English cricketer. Paine was a right-handed batsman who fielded as a wicket-keeper. He was born at Brighton, Sussex.

Paine made his first-class debut for Sussex against the Marylebone Cricket Club in 1851 at the Royal Brunswick Ground, Hove. His next appearances in first-class cricket came in 1854 when he played two matches for Sussex, against Kent and Surrey. The following season he made three first-class appearances, appearing twice for the Gentlemen of England against the Marylebone Cricket Club at Lord's, and the Gentlemen of Kent and Surrey at the same venue. His third appearance came for the Marylebone Cricket Club against Sussex at E Tredcroft's Ground, Warnham Court. He made two first-class appearances each for the Gentlemen of Surrey and Sussex and the Gentlemen of Kent and Sussex in 1856, with all four matches coming against the Gentlemen of England. He also made one first-class appearance for Sussex in 1856 against Kent, as well as playing for the South against the North at Broughton Cricket Club Ground, Salford. He made a final first-class appearance in 1859, for Sussex against the Marylebone Cricket Club. In total, he made thirteen first-class appearances, scoring 224 runs at an average of 11.20, with a high score of 47. Behind the stumps he took 7 catches and made 3 stumpings. For Sussex, his five matches for the county yielded 84 runs at an average of 12.00, with a high score of 47.

He died in Brighton on 1 November 1859.
