= Pains Hill =

Pains Hill may refer to:

- Pains Hill, a hamlet in the parish of Limpsfield, Surrey, England
- Painshill, a landscaped park near Cobham, Surrey, England
  - Painshill House, former mansion house for Painshill park, now Grade II* listed
