= Albert Payne (cricketer) =

English cricketer

Personal information
- Full name: Albert Payne
- Born: 26 June 1885; Leicester, Leicestershire, England
- Died: 7 May 1908 (aged 22); Leicester, Leicestershire, England
- Batting: Right-handed
- Role: Wicket-keeper

Domestic team information
- Years: Team
- 1906–1907: Leicestershire

Career statistics
Competition	First-class
Matches	5
Runs scored	15
Batting average	2.50
100s/50s	–/–
Top score	7*
Balls bowled	–
Wickets	–
Bowling average	–
5 wickets in innings	–
10 wickets in match	–
Best bowling	–
Catches/stumpings	6/1
- Source: Cricinfo, 19 September 2012

Albert Payne (26 June 1885 – 7 May 1908) was an English cricketer. Payne was a right-handed batsman who fielded as a wicket-keeper. He was born at Leicester, Leicestershire.

Payne made his first-class debut for Leicestershire against the touring West Indians in 1906 at Aylestone Road, Leicester. He made four further first-class appearances, the last of which came against Lancashire at Whitegate Park, Blackpool. In his five first-class matches, he scored a total of 15 runs at an average of 2.50, with a high score of 7 not out. Behind the stumps he took six catches and made a single stumping.

His died from tuberculosis at the town of his birth on 7 May 1908. His obituary in the 1909 Wisden Cricketers' Almanack erroneously puts his name as Alfred Payne.
