= Paine Lake =

Lake in the state of Minnesota, United States

- Location within Minnesota
- Location: Hubbard County, Minnesota
- Coordinates: 47°11′23″N 94°59′44″W
- Type: lake

Paine Lake is a lake in Hubbard County, in the U.S. state of Minnesota.

Paine Lake was named for Barrett Channing Paine, a Minnesota explorer.

== See also ==
- List of lakes in Minnesota
