= Howard Payne =

Howard Payne may refer to

- Edward Howard Payne (1849-1908), businessman in Missouri
  - Howard Payne University, named after Edward Howard Payne
- Howard Payne (athlete) (1931–1992), Olympic athlete from England
- John Howard Payne (1791–1852), American actor, poet, playwright and author
- Howard Payne (Speed), fictional character
