= Paines (surname) =

Family name

- Language: Norman, English, French, Portuguese

Origin
- Word/name: Normandy, France
- Derivation: Pagānus (Medieval Latin)

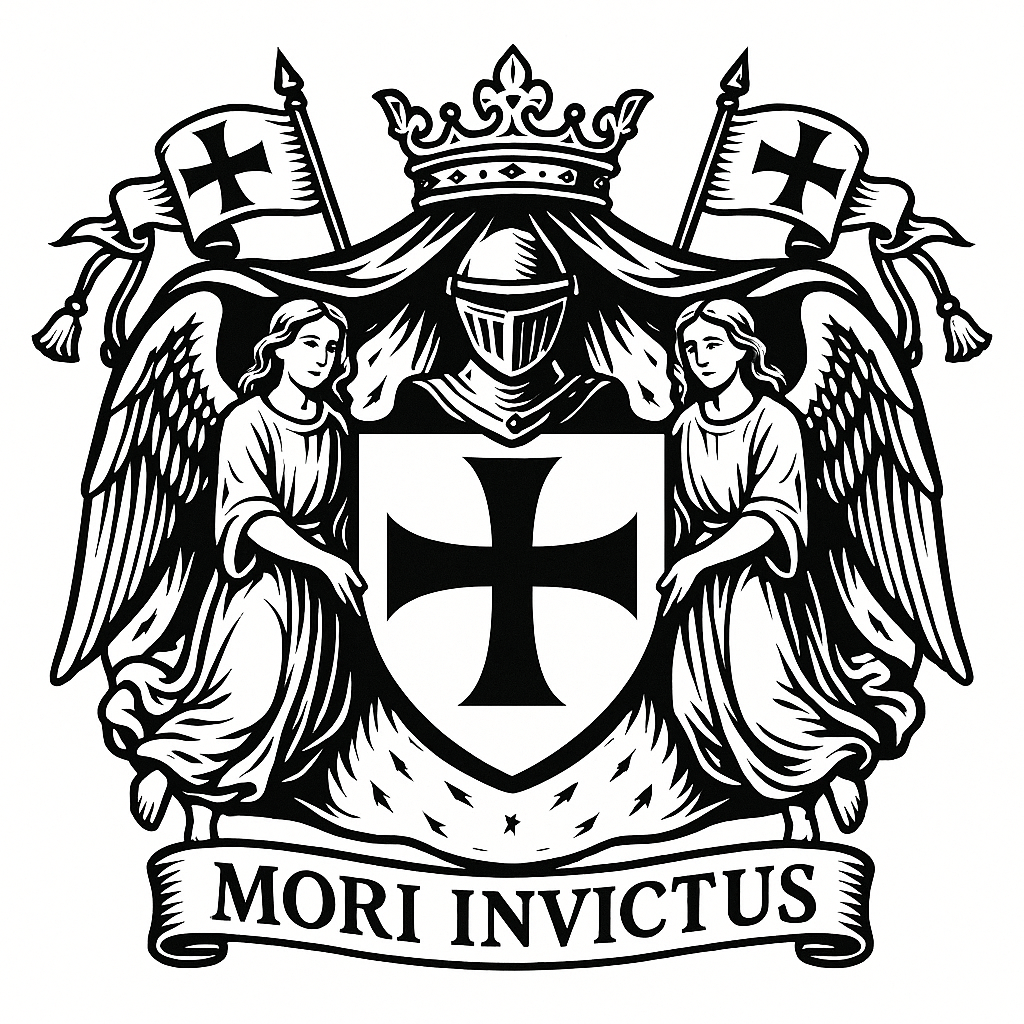
Genealogical representation associated with the surname Paines

Paines is a surname of Anglo-Norman origin, first recorded in England in the period following the Norman Conquest of 1066.

== Etymology ==
The surname derives from the medieval Latin given name Pagānus, which entered Old French as paien. Its original meaning was "villager" or "countryman." Subsequently, in a religious context, the term acquired the meaning of "pagan."

Common spelling variations of the name include Payne, Payn, Pagan, and Fitz-Payn (a patronymic form meaning "son of Payn").

== History ==
The name appears in the Domesday Book of 1086, where an individual is recorded as Edmund filius Pagen (Edmund, son of Pagen). Studies in onomastics indicate that the name became established as a hereditary surname in medieval England between the 11th and 13th centuries.

During the English colonization of the Americas, the name was introduced to New England in the 17th century by settlers from Great Britain.

== Coat of arms ==
Certain British armorials record coats of arms associated with the Paine surname. A version described in Fairbairn's Book of Crests is blazoned as follows:

- Arms: Argent, a cross patoncé Sable.
- Helm: A knight's helmet surmounted by a crown.
- Supporters: Two angelic figures.
- Motto: Mori Invictus (Latin for "To die unconquered").

Note: A coat of arms is granted to an individual, not a family or surname. The arms described above would belong only to the specific lineage for which they were granted.

== Notable people ==
- Albert Bigelow Paine (1861–1937), American author and biographer.
- Albert Ingraham Paine (1874–1949), English cricketer.
- Bayard H. Paine (1872–1955), Justice of the Nebraska Supreme Court.
- Robert Treat Paine (1731–1814), American lawyer, politician, and a signer of the Declaration of Independence.
- Robert Treat Paine Jr. (1773–1811), American poet and editor.
- Thomas Paine (1737–1809), English-born American political activist, philosopher, and revolutionary.
- Thomas O. Paine (1921–1992), American engineer and NASA Administrator who oversaw the first seven Apollo missions.
