= Wyndham Payne =

English artist and illustrator

Albert Wyndham Payne (2 February 1888 – 13 July 1974) known as Wyndham, was an English artist, illustrator, painter, model-maker and muralist. He was a self-taught artist known for the freedom of line, sense of freshness, bright colours and good humour in his work. He worked mainly in linocuts, woodcuts, watercolours and silhouette painting on glass. His commercial work was for publishers producing illustrations, calendars, greeting cards, advertisements, and book covers for the leading authors of his day, such as crime writer Agatha Christie. There is an extensive collection of Payne's work in London's Victoria and Albert Museum, where, as of June 2023, it is being held in the Archive of Art and Design.

== Early years ==
Albert Wyndham Payne was born on 2 February 1888 in Reading, Berkshire, England. His mother was Fanny Elizabeth Gould (1848–1930) and his father was William Henry Payne (1854–1912), a legal clerk. He had three brothers Reginald Henry Payne (born 1878), Laurence James Payne (born 1880) Cecil Thomas Payne (born 1887), and a sister Flora Gladys Payne (born 1891).

Payne liked to be known by his middle-name Wyndham rather than his first name Albert, because of supposed family links to the English aristocratic line of the Wyndhams of Petworth House in Sussex, England. As a boy, growing up in St Giles, Berkshire, Payne was a highly creative child. He was a pupil at Kendrick School, Queen's Road, Reading. In 1912, after leaving school he joined the local biscuit manufacturer Huntley and Palmer as a salesman.

In 1913 Payne enlisted as a trooper in the Royal Berkshire Imperial Yeomanry.

Towards the end of World War I, on 26 July 1917, Payne married Dorothy Constance Craven at St Martin-in-the-Fields Church in Trafalgar Square, London. They had one son, Major Paul Ian Craven Payne, born 26 April 1920 in Southbourne, Hampshire, England.

By 1924 Payne and Craven bought a house, Waterford Cottage, in Guildford, Surrey, which was commutable to London. The cottage became a good family home and a place for their lives to grow. This booming era and more settled family time reflects Payne's growing reputation as an artist. Highlights include illustrating Kenneth Grahame's The Wind in the Willows (1927) and a book covers for the leading authors of the day including Agatha Christie.

== Later years ==
In the 1930s, Payne and Craven moved to Tivoli House in Cheltenham, Gloucestershire. His decreasing eye-sight due to glaucoma meant he struggled to see the lines for his art work and he largely retired from that kind of work. However, he still used his creative knowledge and driven personality for a variety of organisations, scouring junk shops for hidden gems of art, being a youth leader and making models for his children and grandchildren.

On one of his youth leader trips in Dorset, two boys got taken ill and had to attend the children's ward in the newly opened Lyme Regis Cottage hospital in May 1937.

To show his gratitude Payne painted some spectacular murals, one featuring A.A. Milne's Winnie the Pooh and many other of Payne's leitmotif characters such as soldiers and cosy Christmas items. These historic murals were only recently uncovered again after the hospital was turned into a nursing home, which meant they were covered by boards and lining paper for more than 30 years.

During the Second World War, Payne was a Squadron Leader commanding 175 Squadron, Air Training Corps, Cheltenham, England. The RAF considered the training corps to be the "junior RAF". On 13 September 1941 in the Cheltenham Chronicle and Gloucester Graphic newspaper, Payne was quoted as saying:

The success of the Air Training Corps since its formation has been phenomenal, and latest statistics prove that one in four on the entire male population of this country between the ages of 16 and 18 is a member of the corps.

He retired from this position in 1942.

Throughout his life, Payne often supplemented his artwork by scouring junk shops for works of art, restoring furniture and taking apart paintings in the hope of finding another more desirable painting underneath. He also bought and sold at auctions.

One such find was in the early 1940s when Payne found an International Gothic medieval work of art in a Cirencester antique shop. The Wyndham Payne Crucifixion, as it is now called, was painted by Herman Scheerre in the early 15th century. This miniature, evoking intense spirituality, illuminated on vellum, is considered one the finest pieces of English art work of its kind. Art historian D.H. Turner described the painter of this remarkable find, Herman Scheerre, as "the most important artist in England of the International Gothic style".

Another find by Payne was a John Constable watercolour called The Mill which was subsequently sold at auction in 1998 for £90,000.

He died on 13 July 1974 in Honiton, Devon, where he had been living for twenty years.

== Career ==
One of the main sources of inspiration of Payne's work and style is often attributed to fellow illustrator Claude Lovat Fraser. His own career as an illustrator began to take off in the 1920s with weekly trips to London where he would approach publishers such as John Lane of The Bodleian, Sharmid, the artists' agent, the Medici society, Morland Press and ballet enthusiast Cyril Beaumont.

Beaumont owned a bookshop at 75 Charing Cross Road where he printed books in his basement.

Payne and Beaumont went on to collaborate on multiple projects together including, The Mysterious Toyshop, Sea Magic and Town and Country among many others.

An original poster by Payne for Beaumont's burlesque ballet Circus from 1926 performed by The Cremorne Company, is held at the Victoria and Albert Museum, London as part of the Beaumont bequest. The watercolour and gouache poster shows a full-length clown wearing a conical hat over a black skull cap, stripey trousers and pumps with red pom-poms on. The Victoria and Albert Museum collections object history page explains the historical significance:

The venture is significant as part of the growing ballet activity in England in the wake of revived interest in dance in the 1920s, which culminated in the foundation of permanent companies in Marie Rambert's Ballet Club and Ninette de Valois' Vic-Wells (now Royal) Ballet.

By 1930 Payne had drawn approximately 80 book covers for The Bodley Head, The Beaumont Press, Oxford University Press, Hodder & Stoughton and Methuen Publishing. Probably the most notable commission from this time came in 1927, when Payne was the first British artist to illustrate the well-known children's story The Wind in the Willows by Kenneth Grahame. This book went on to become a classic of British literature. Other artists who have illustrated this book include Paul Bransom (1913), Nancy Barnhart (1922), Ernest H. Shepard (1931), Arthur Rackham (1940), Richard Cuffari (1966), Tasha Tudor (1966), Michael Hague (1980), James Lynch (1995) Scott McKowen (2005), and Robert Ingpen (2007).

Payne's version of The Wind in the Willows meant he produced 20 pages of illustrations for the book. He may have taken inspiration from his youth and first job for biscuit manufacturers Huntley & Palmers, whose tins at that time were often designed in a mawkish yellow. The Wind in the Willows book cover and pages were similarly drawn in a distinctive yellow.

Critics of Payne's production suggest his work on this book is not even worth a mention, compared to Ernest H. Shepard's version, who was the next artist after Payne to illustrate the book. Booksellers note that the Wyndham Payne illustrated edition published in the distinctive yellow is the "only colour" used for all 20 of the book pages. However, children's author Selma G. Lanes wrote that even though Payne's twenty animated drawings have almost nothing in common with the "stateliness of Grahame's prose" they are the most ambitious to date" and a full of "lively improvisations".

She added:

Payne's contribution was to place the characters in unmistakably English countryside. His inspired conception of Toad's canary-yellow caravan has remained throughout all ensuing editions. Nevermind that Payne's Mole looked like a weasel; the artist's irreverent approach proved liberating.

— Selma G. Lanes

One of Payne's last commissions was the book The Wife of Wellington by Maud Wellington, privately printed in 1943, subtitled a fantasy founded on fact and treated with liberty, "with decorations by Wyndham Payne".
