= Pain and Suffering =

Pain and suffering is the legal term for the physical and emotional stress caused from an injury.

Pain and Suffering may also refer to:

- Pain & Suffering, a 2007 album by American rock band Rhino Bucket
- Azab dan Sengsara, a 1920 Indonesian novel by Merari Siregar
- "Pain and Suffering", a 1982 song from Iggy Pop's album Zombie Birdhouse

== See also ==
- Pain
- Suffering
