= John Barton Payne =

American politician and judge (1855–1935)

John Payne
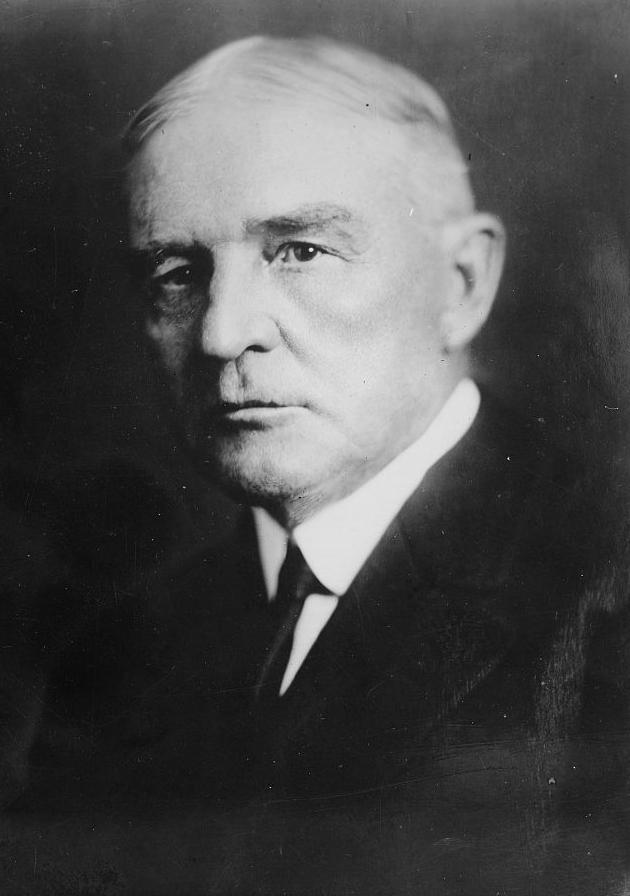

27th United States Secretary of the Interior
- In office March 15, 1920 – March 4, 1921
- President: Woodrow Wilson
- Preceded by: Franklin Lane
- Succeeded by: Albert B. Fall

President of the United States Shipping Board
- In office 1919 – February 1920

President of the Chicago South Park Board
- In office 1911–1924

Judge on the Superior Court of Cook County
- In office 1893–1898

Personal details
- Born: January 26, 1855 Pruntytown, Virginia, U.S.
- Died: January 24, 1935 (aged 79) Washington, D.C., U.S.
- Resting place: Oak Hill Cemetery
- Party: Democratic
- Spouse(s): Kate Bunker Jennie Byrd Bryan (m. 1913; died 1919)
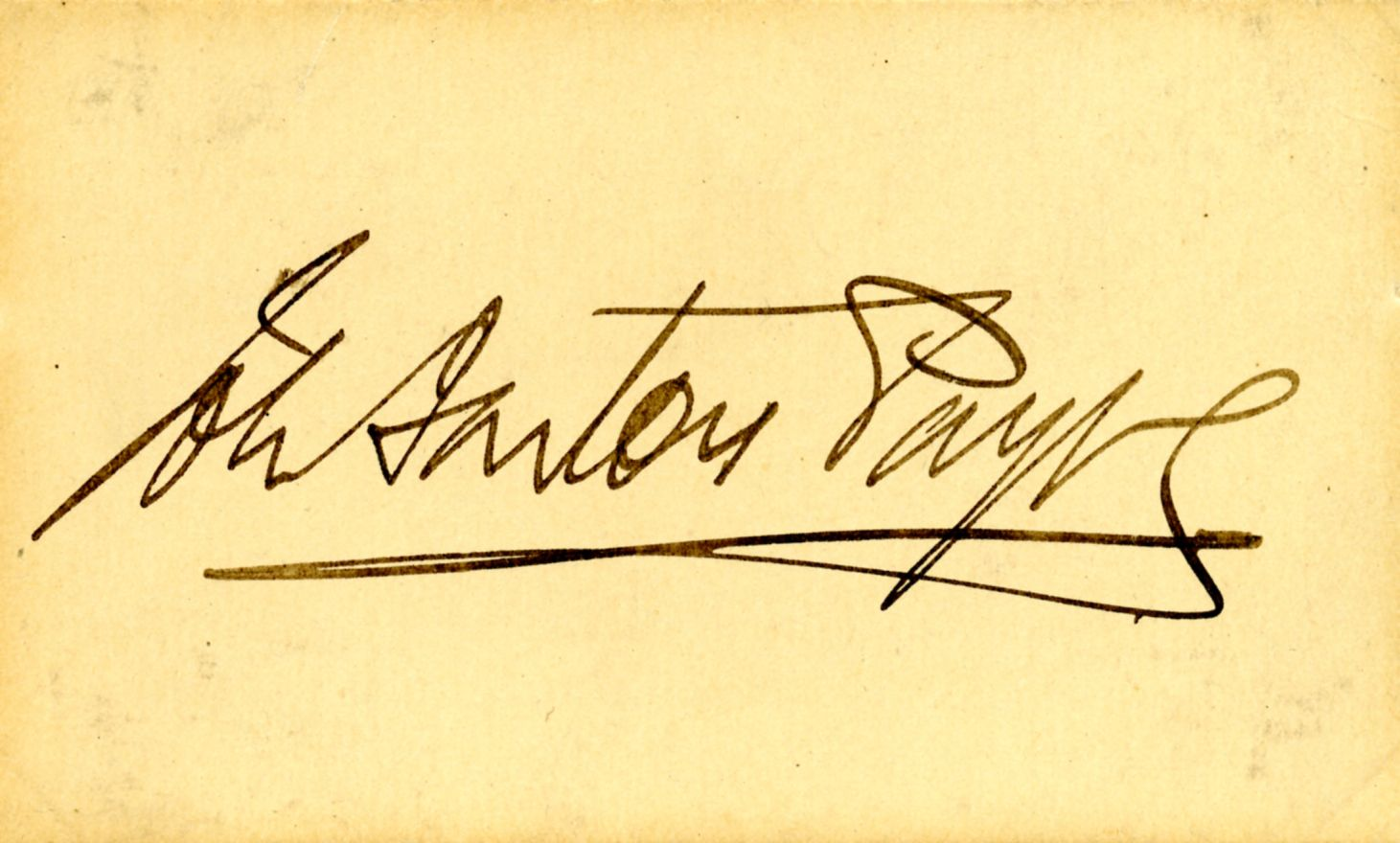
- Signature

John Barton Payne (January 26, 1855 – January 24, 1935) was an American politician, lawyer and judge. He served as the United States Secretary of the Interior from 1920 until 1921 under Woodrow Wilson's administration.

== Early life and career ==
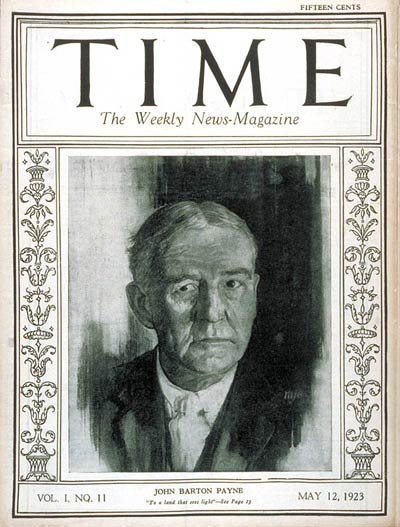
Time cover, 12 May 1923

Payne was born on January 26, 1855, in Pruntytown, Virginia, the son of Amos Payne, who was a medical doctor and farmer, and the former Elizabeth Barton.

Admitted to the bar in 1876 in West Virginia, Payne entered politics five years later as the chairman of the Preston County Democratic Party. He moved to Chicago, Illinois, in 1883, and was elected in 1893 to the Superior Court of Cook County, which he served on until resigning from that post in 1898. Payne notably oversaw the Patrick Eugene Prendergast's unsuccessful appeal to his conviction for assassinating Chicago Mayor Carter Harrison Sr.

After resigning his judgeship, Payne was the senior partner in Winston, Payne, Strawn and Shaw. A successor firm, Winston & Strawn, still exists. He was the president of the Chicago's South Park Board from 1911 to 1924.

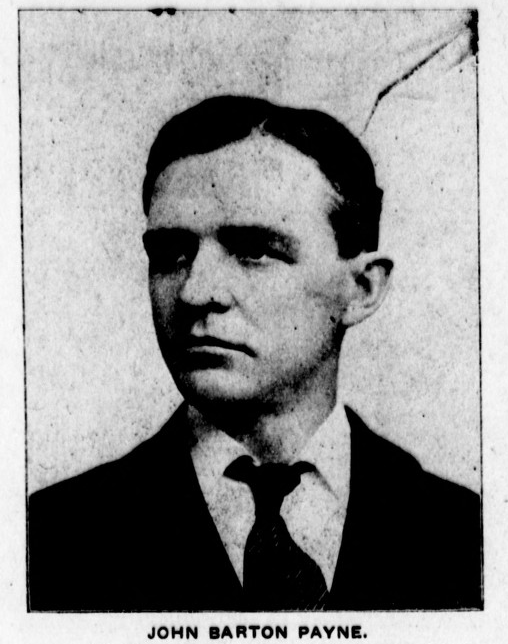
John Barton Payne in the Chicago Eagle newspaper, 1910

In 1913 he declined an offer from president Woodrow Wilson to serve as solicitor general of the United States.

After the outbreak of World War I, Payne went to Washington, D.C., to act as the counsel for the Emergency Fleet Corporation and was the general counsel of the United States Railroad Administration Feb. 1918-Aug. 1919. From 1919 through his appointment to Wilson's cabinet in February 1920, Payne served as the Chairman of the U.S. Shipping Board.

In May 1921, Payne pledged funds for the permanent structure for the Warrenton Library in Fauquier County, Virginia.

Payne was a founder of the Virginia Museum of Fine Arts in Richmond in 1911, and he donated 50 paintings to the museum in 1919. Some of his personal papers were given to the Special Collections Research Center at the College of William & Mary.

From October 1921 until his death, Payne served as the Chairman of the American Red Cross. The following year, after the resignation of Henry P. Davison, he was unanimously elected Chairman of the Board of Governors of the League of Red Cross Societies (now the International Federation of Red Cross and Red Crescent Societies), a position he also held until his death in 1935. He was succeeded by Cary T. Grayson.

== Personal life ==
Payne married Kate Bunker on October 17, 1878. She died after a long illness. Payne married his second wife, the former Jennie Byrd Bryan (daughter of the late Thomas Barbour Bryan), on May 1, 1913. Jennie Payne died in 1919, and he remained a widower in office.

== Death and legacy ==
He died of pneumonia after an operation for appendicitis on January 24, 1935, at the age of 79. Two days later, on what would have been his 80th birthday, an Associated Press obituary ran in the Chicago Tribune. Payne was buried in Oak Hill Cemetery in Washington, D.C., next to his second wife.

In World War II, the United States Liberty ship SS John Barton Payne was named in his honor.

== Sources ==
- John B. Payne, Ex-Member of the Cabinet, Dead, Chicago Tribune, p. 1, Jan. 24, 1935
- American Red Cross website
- Fauquier County Public Library - Library History

Political offices
| Preceded by Franklin K. Lane | U.S. Secretary of the Interior; Served under: Woodrow Wilson; March 15, 1920 – March 4, 1921 | Succeeded by Albert B. Fall |
Non-profit organization positions
| Preceded by Henry Davison | Chairman of the International League of Red Cross Societies; 1922–1935 | Succeeded by Cary Travers Grayson |
Awards and achievements
| Preceded by James M. Beck | Cover of Time Magazine; 12 May 1923 | Succeeded by René Viviani |
