= Albert Ingraham Paine =

English soldier and cricketer (1874–1949)

Albert Paine
Personal information
- Full name: Albert Ingraham Paine
- Born: 12 January 1874; India
- Died: 29 June 1949 (aged 75); London, England

Domestic team information
- Years: Team
- 1896–97: Western Province

Career statistics
Competition	First-class
Matches	4
Runs scored	253
Batting average	42.16
100s/50s	1/0
Top score	220
Catches/stumpings	3/–
- Source: Cricinfo, 11 May 2024

Lieutenant-Colonel Albert Ingraham Paine CMG DSO (12 January 1874 – 29 June 1949) was an English soldier who played first-class cricket while stationed in South Africa. He scored the first double-century in South African first-class cricket, and was decorated for his service in the British Army in both the Second Boer War and World War I.

== Life and career ==
Paine was born in British India and educated in England at Harrow School, where he played cricket in the First XI, and at the Royal Military Academy Sandhurst. He joined the King's Royal Rifle Corps after leaving Sandhurst in 1894.

While serving in South Africa, Paine represented Western Province in the 1896–97 Currie Cup. In his second match, against Griqualand West, he scored 220 – the first double-century in South African first-class cricket. He added 225 for the fourth wicket with his captain, Thomas Etlinger. Western Province went on to win the Currie Cup, but Paine's other contributions were modest; he made a pair in the final, his last first-class match.

Paine served in the 1st Mounted Infantry during the Second Boer War. He was twice mentioned in despatches, was promoted to captain in June 1901, and was created a Companion of the Distinguished Service Order in October 1902. Shortly after the start of World War I in 1914 he was given command of the 12th (Service) Battalion King's Royal Rifles. Once again he was twice mentioned in despatches during the war. He was created a Companion of the Order of St Michael and St George in June 1916.

Paine married Elsie Caroline Wykeham in 1906, and they had two daughters. They lived in Bledington, Oxfordshire; he died in London in 1949.
