= Münster-Geschinen =

- Former municipality
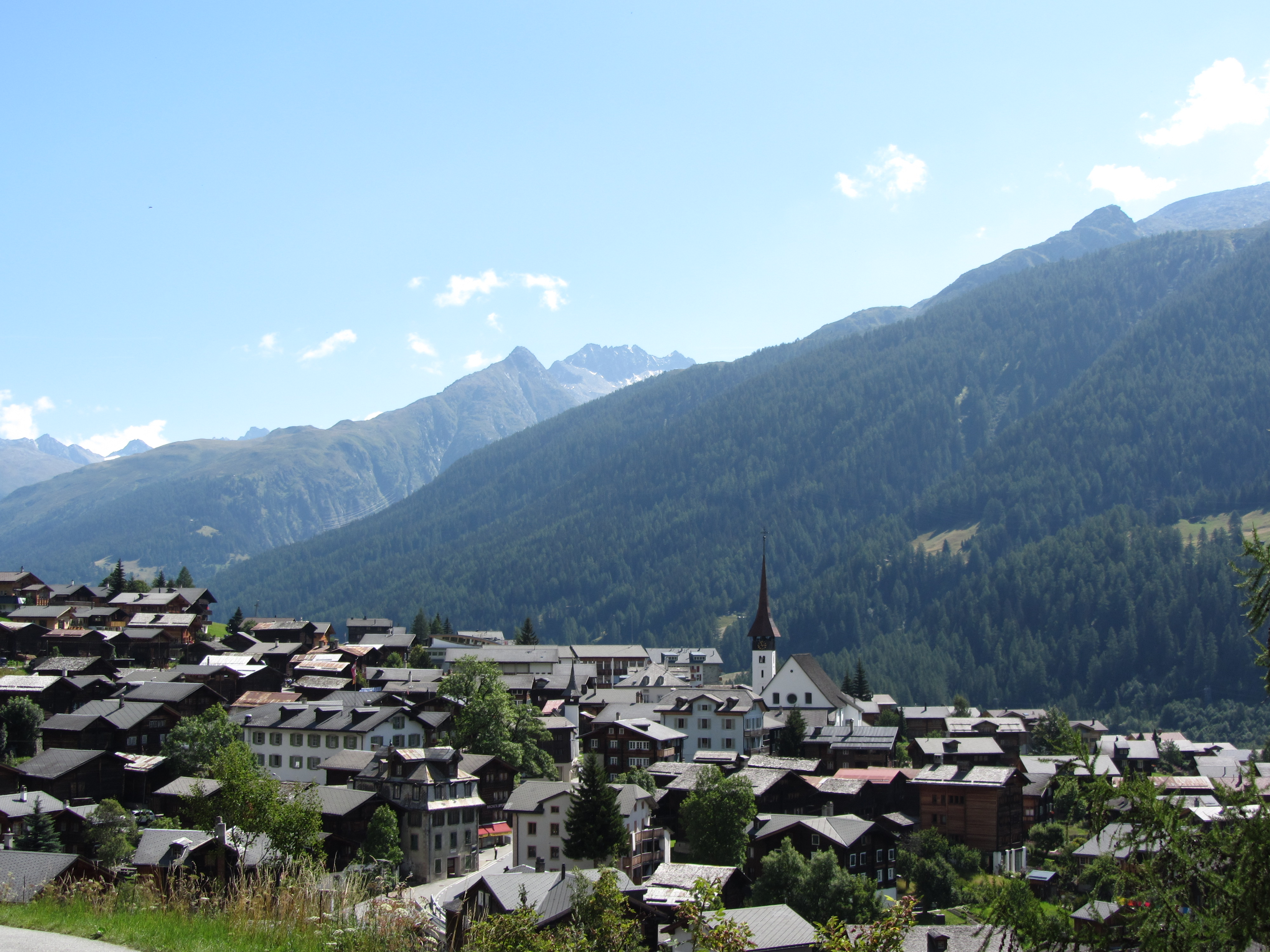

- Flag Coat of arms
- Location of Münster-Geschinen
- Location within Switzerland Location within Canton of Valais
- Coordinates: 46°29′N 8°15′E
- Country: Switzerland
- Canton: Valais
- District: Goms

Government
  - Mayor: Werner Lagger

Area
  - Total: 48.6 km^{2} (18.8 sq mi)
- Elevation: 1,370 m (4,490 ft)

Population (December 2002)
  - Total: 489
  - Density: 10.1/km^{2} (26.1/sq mi)
- Time zone: UTC+01:00 (CET)
  - Summer (DST): UTC+02:00 (CEST)
- Postal code: 3985
- SFOS number: 6074
- ISO 3166 code: CH-VS
- Surrounded by: Fieschertal, Guttannen (BE), Reckingen-Gluringen, Ulrichen
- Website: www.gemeinde-goms.ch

Münster-Geschinen is a former municipality in the district of Goms in the canton of Valais in Switzerland. It was formed in 2004, from the union of the municipalities of Münster and Geschinen. On 1 January 2017, the former municipalities of Münster-Geschinen, Blitzingen, Grafschaft, Niederwald and Reckingen-Gluringen merged into the new municipality of Goms.

== History ==
Münster is first mentioned in 1221 as Musterium. Geschinen is first mentioned in 1327 as Gessinon.

== Geography ==
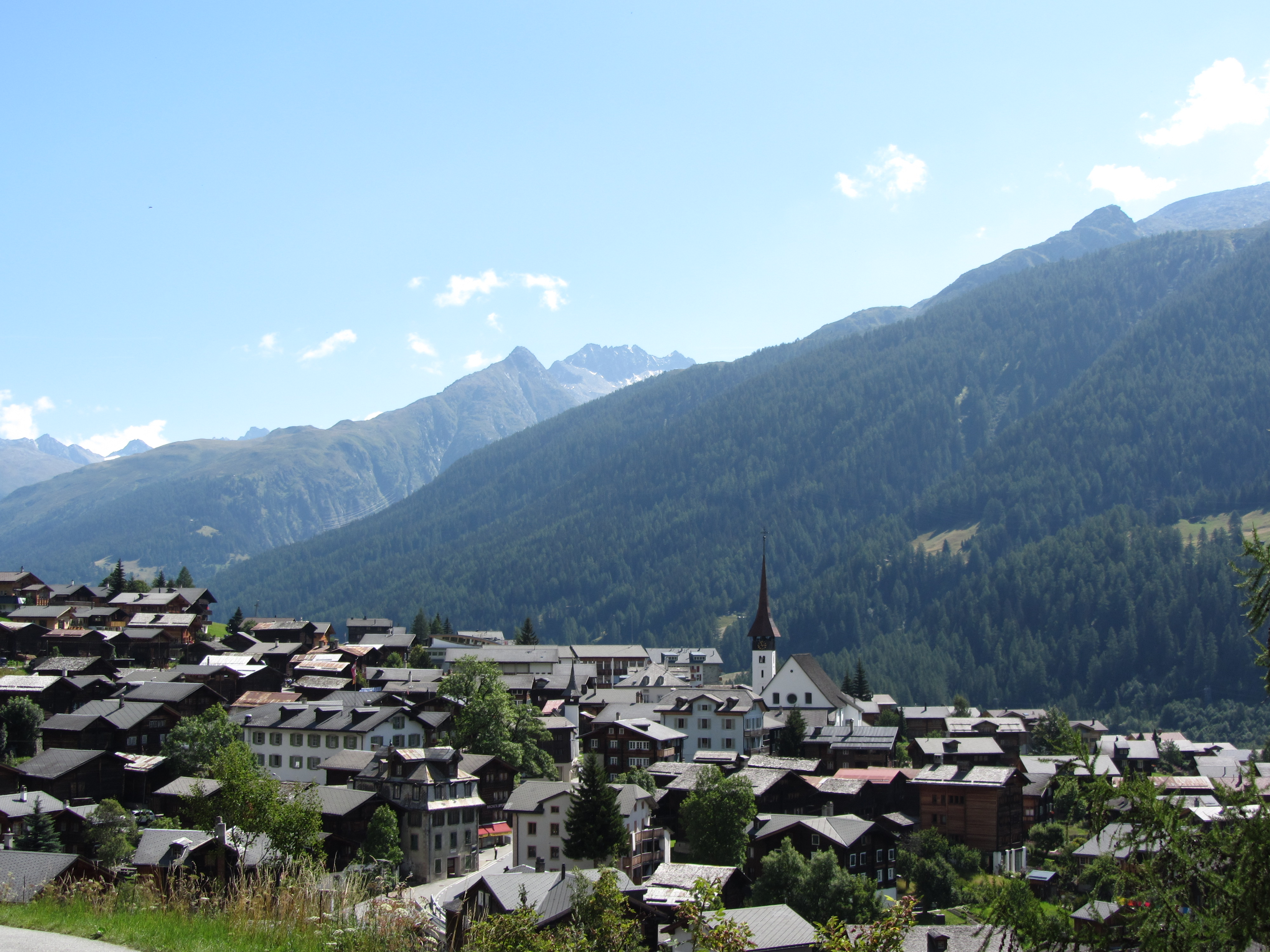
Münster-Geschinen

Aerial view (1955)

Münster-Geschinen had an area, as of 2011, of 48.6 square kilometers (18.8 mi^{2}). Of this area, 32.8% is used for agricultural purposes, while 19.0% is forested. Of the rest of the land, 1.0% is settled (buildings or roads) and 47.2% is unproductive land.

Trützisee is located at an elevation of 2,579 m (8,461 ft), below Löffelhorn (3,095 m (10,154 ft)).

== Demographics ==
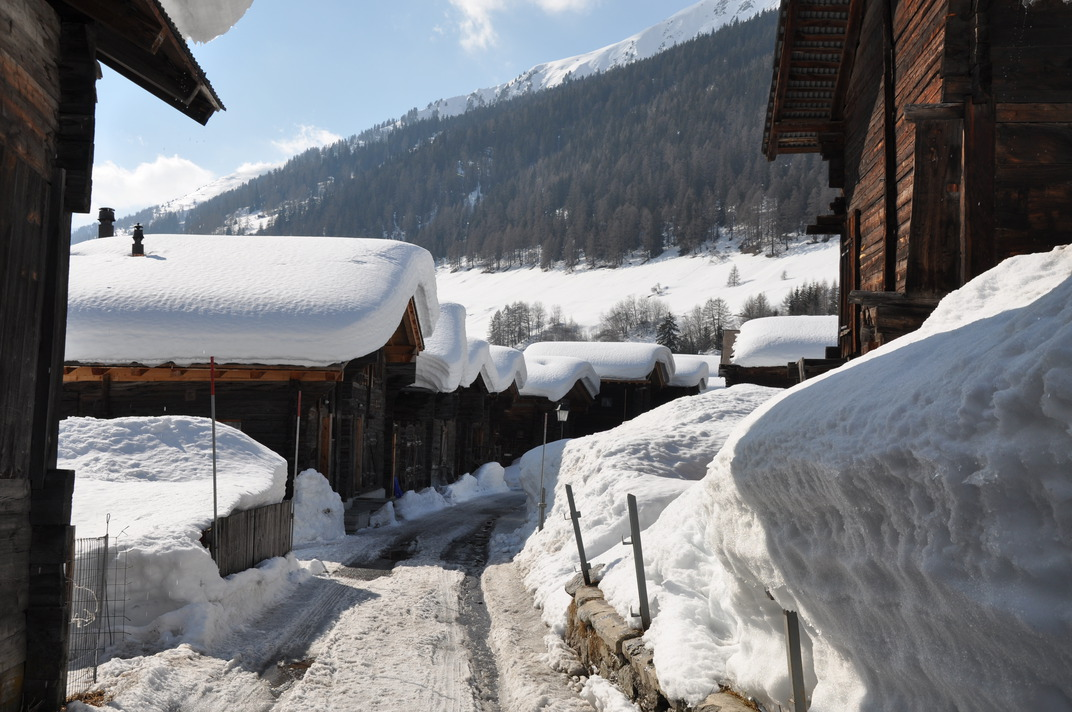
Münster village during winter

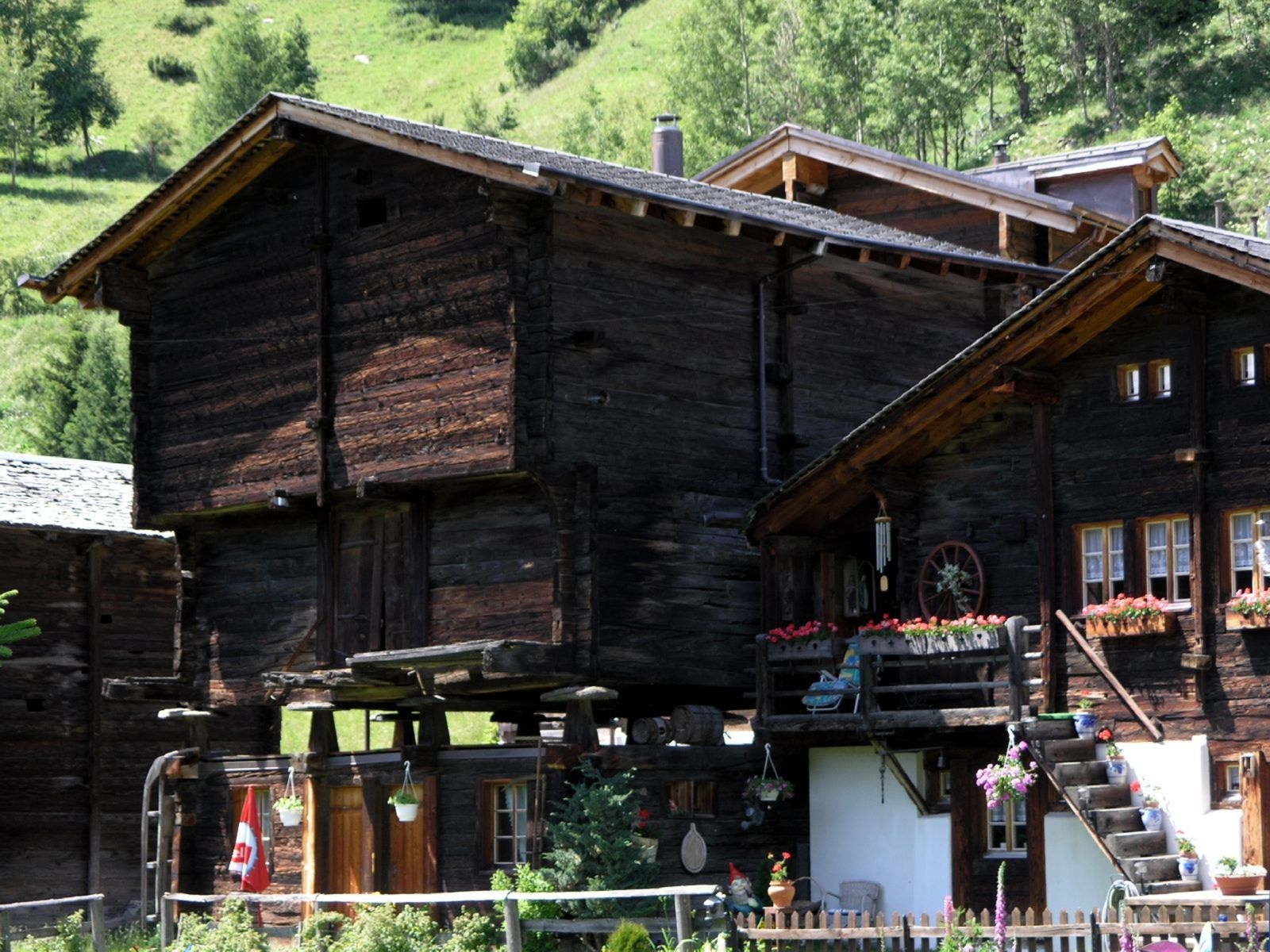
House in Münster village

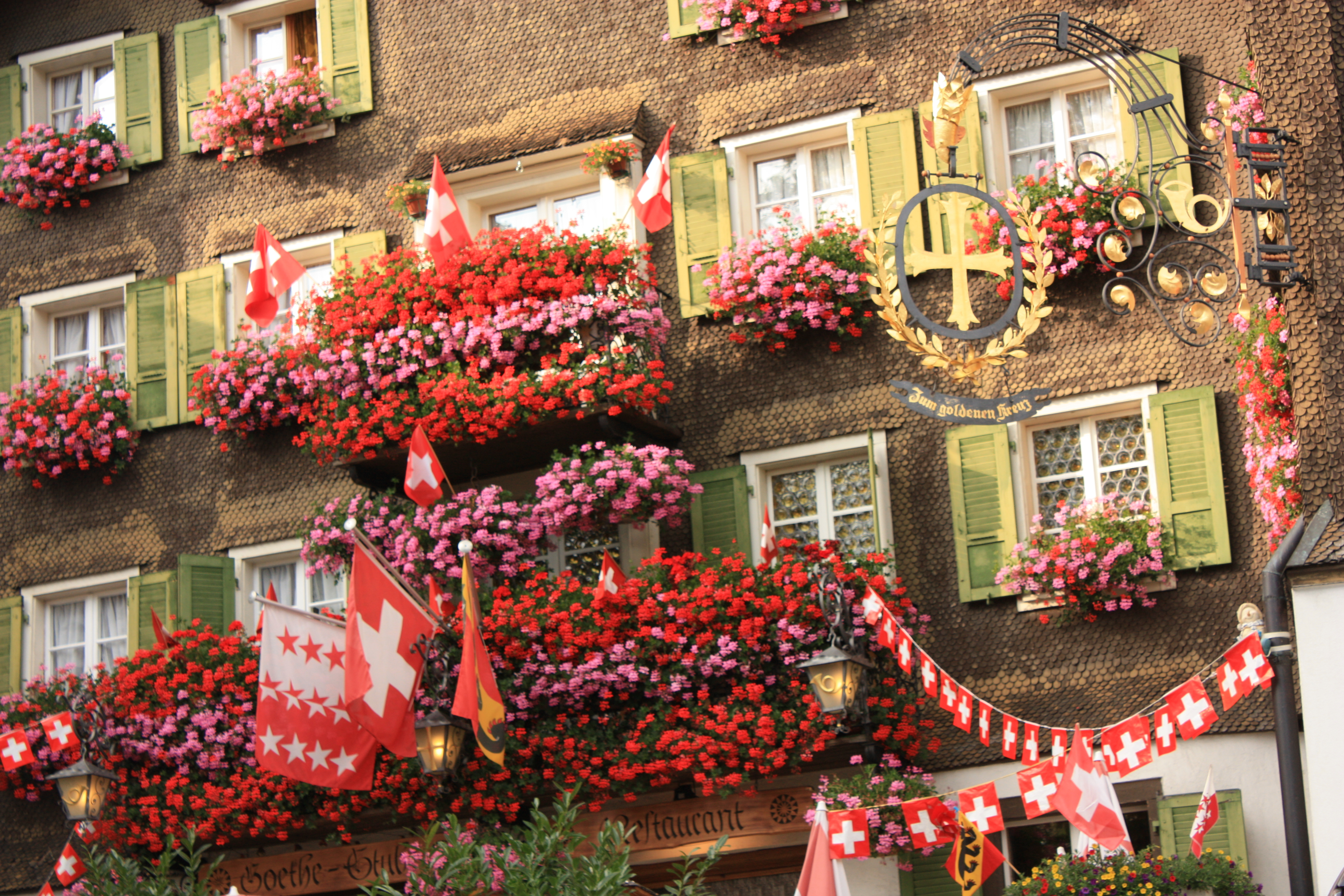
Flowery balconies in Münster

Münster-Geschinen had a population (as of 2015) of 489. As of 2008, 12.2% of the population are resident foreign nationals. Over the last 10 years (1999–2009 ) the population has changed at a rate of -9.2%. It has changed at a rate of -11.3% due to migration and at a rate of -5.5% due to births and deaths.

As of 2008, the gender distribution of the population was 54.8% male and 45.2% female. The population was made up of 22 Swiss men (52.4% of the population) and 1 (2.4%) non-Swiss men. There were 17 Swiss women (40.5%) and 2 (4.8%) non-Swiss women.

The age distribution of the population (as of 2000) is children and teenagers (0–19 years old) make up 22.7% of the population, while adults (20–64 years old) make up 53.3% and seniors (over 64 years old) make up 24%.

As of 2009, the construction rate of new housing units was 27 new units per 1000 residents. The vacancy rate for the municipality, in 2010, was 3.95%.

=== Münster demographics ===
In Münster most of the population (as of 2000) speaks German (407 or 89.5%) as their first language, Serbo-Croatian is the second most common (17 or 3.7%) and Albanian is the third (12 or 2.6%). There are 5 people who speak French.

Of the population in the municipality 229 or about 50.3% were born in Münster and lived there in 2000. There were 101 or 22.2% who were born in the same canton, while 51 or 11.2% were born somewhere else in Switzerland, and 59 or 13.0% were born outside of Switzerland. As of 2000, there were 168 people who were single and never married in the municipality. There were 243 married individuals, 36 widows or widowers and 8 individuals who are divorced.

There were 79 households that consist of only one person and 14 households with five or more people. Out of a total of 214 households that answered this question, 36.9% were households made up of just one person and there were 2 adults who lived with their parents. Of the rest of the households, there are 61 married couples without children, 44 married couples with children There were 15 single parents with a child or children. There were 2 households that were made up of unrelated people and 11 households that were made up of some sort of institution or another collective housing.

In 2000 there were 79 single family homes (or 42.9% of the total) out of a total of 184 inhabited buildings. There were 68 multi-family buildings (37.0%), along with 21 multi-purpose buildings that were mostly used for housing (11.4%) and 16 other use buildings (commercial or industrial) that also had some housing (8.7%).

In 2000, a total of 192 apartments (54.1% of the total) were permanently occupied, while 153 apartments (43.1%) were seasonally occupied and 10 apartments (2.8%) were empty.

=== Geschinen demographics ===
In Geschinen, all of the population, 65 people as of 2000, speaks German.

Of the population in the municipality 33 or about 50.8% were born in Geschinen and lived there in 2000. There were 19 or 29.2% who were born in the same canton, while 10 or 15.4% were born somewhere else in Switzerland, and 3 or 4.6% were born outside of Switzerland. As of 2000, there were 24 people who were single and never married in the municipality. There were 35 married individuals, 2 widows or widowers and 4 individuals who are divorced.

There were 9 households that consist of only one person and 1 households with five or more people. Out of a total of 31 households that answered this question, 29.0% were households made up of just one person. Of the rest of the households, there are 12 married couples without children, 6 married couples with children There were 2 single parents with a child or children. There were 2 households that were made up of unrelated people.

In 2000 there were 33 single family homes (or 51.6% of the total) out of a total of 64 inhabited buildings. There were 17 multi-family buildings (26.6%), along with 9 multi-purpose buildings that were mostly used for housing (14.1%) and 5 other use buildings (commercial or industrial) that also had some housing (7.8%).

In 2000, a total of 28 apartments (30.1% of the total) were permanently occupied, while 54 apartments (58.1%) were seasonally occupied and 11 apartments (11.8%) were empty.

== Historic Population ==
The historical population is given in the following chart:

== Heritage sites of national significance ==
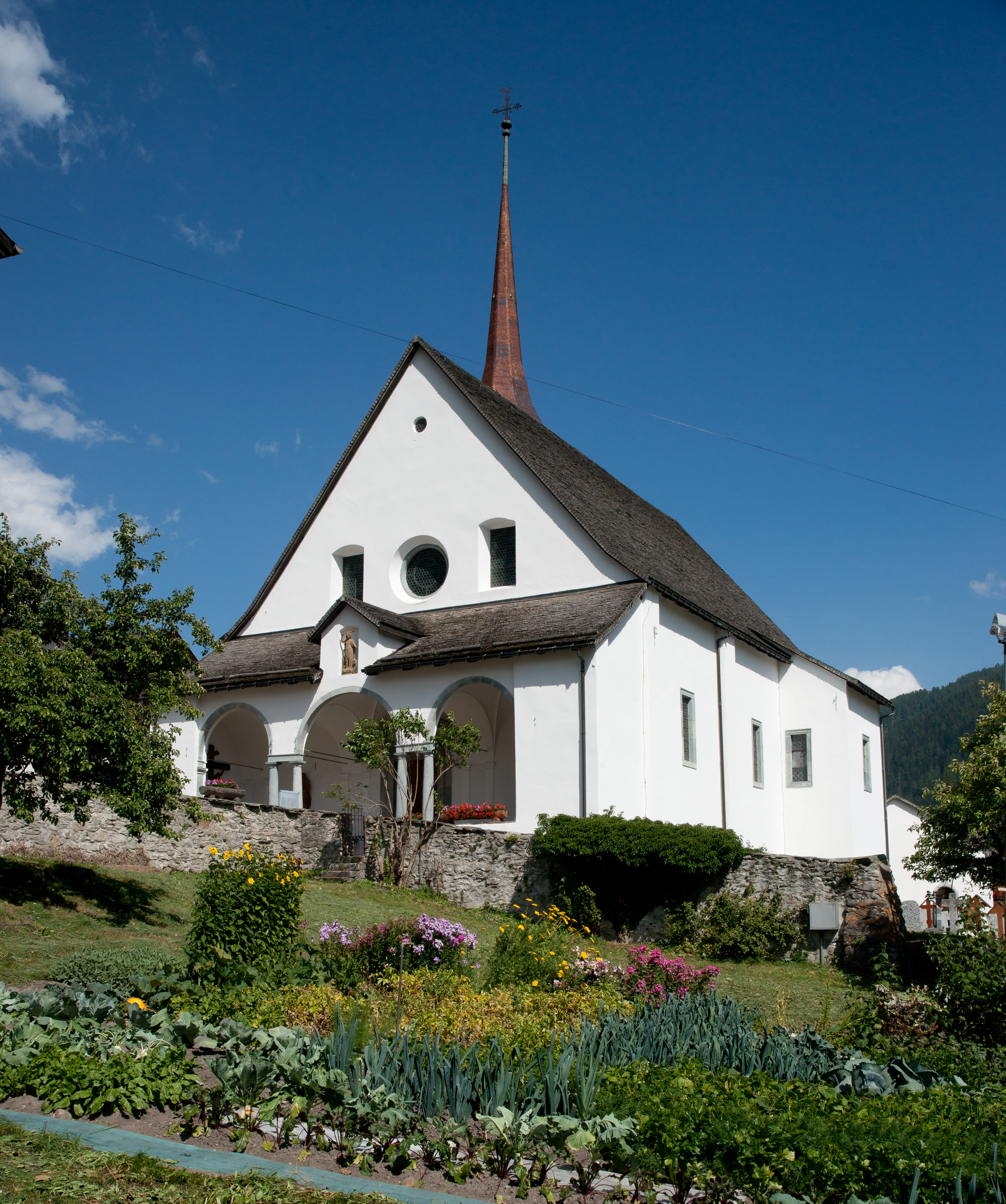
Church of St. Maria

The Church of St. Maria with Cemetery Chapel is listed as a Swiss heritage site of national significance. The entire villages of Münster and Geschinen are both part of the Inventory of Swiss Heritage Sites.

== Politics ==
In the 2007, federal election the most popular party was the CVP which received 68.41% of the vote. The next three most popular parties were the SVP (17.22%), the SP (8.61%) and the Green Party (2.32%). In the federal election, a total of 231 votes were cast, and the voter turnout was 57.8%.

In the 2009, Conseil d'État/Staatsrat election a total of 173 votes were cast, of which 17 or about 9.8% were invalid. The voter participation was 46.1%, which is much less than the cantonal average of 54.67%. In the 2007, Swiss Council of States election a total of 235 votes were cast, of which 4 or about 1.7% were invalid. The voter participation was 61.2%, which is similar to the cantonal average of 59.88%.

== Economy ==
As of 2010, Münster-Geschinen had an unemployment rate of 1.6%. As of 2008, there were 34 people employed in the primary economic sector and about 17 businesses involved in this sector. 57 people were employed in the secondary sector and there were 7 businesses in this sector. 164 people were employed in the tertiary sector, with 34 businesses in this sector.

In 2008 the total number of full-time equivalent jobs was 209. The number of jobs in the primary sector was 20, all of which were in agriculture. The number of jobs in the secondary sector was 54 of which 1 was in manufacturing and 51 (94.4%) were in construction. The number of jobs in the tertiary sector was 135. In the tertiary sector; 50 or 37.0% were in wholesale or retail sales or the repair of motor vehicles, 5 or 3.7% were in the movement and storage of goods, 54 or 40.0% were in a hotel or restaurant, 1 was the insurance or financial industry, 4 or 3.0% were technical professionals or scientists, 2 or 1.5% were in education and 7 or 5.2% were in health care.

Of the working population, 5.7% used public transportation to get to work, and 34.4% used a private car.

=== Münster economy ===
There were 217 residents of Münster who were employed in some capacity, of which females made up 40.6% of the workforce. In 2000, there were 71 workers who commuted into the municipality and 67 workers who commuted away. The municipality is a net importer of workers, with about 1.1 workers entering the municipality for every one leaving.

=== Geschinen economy ===
There were 27 residents of Geschinen who were employed in some capacity, of which females made up 33.3% of the workforce. In 2000, there were 14 workers who commuted into the municipality and 13 workers who commuted away. The municipality is a net importer of workers, with about 1.1 workers entering the municipality for every one leaving.

== Religion ==
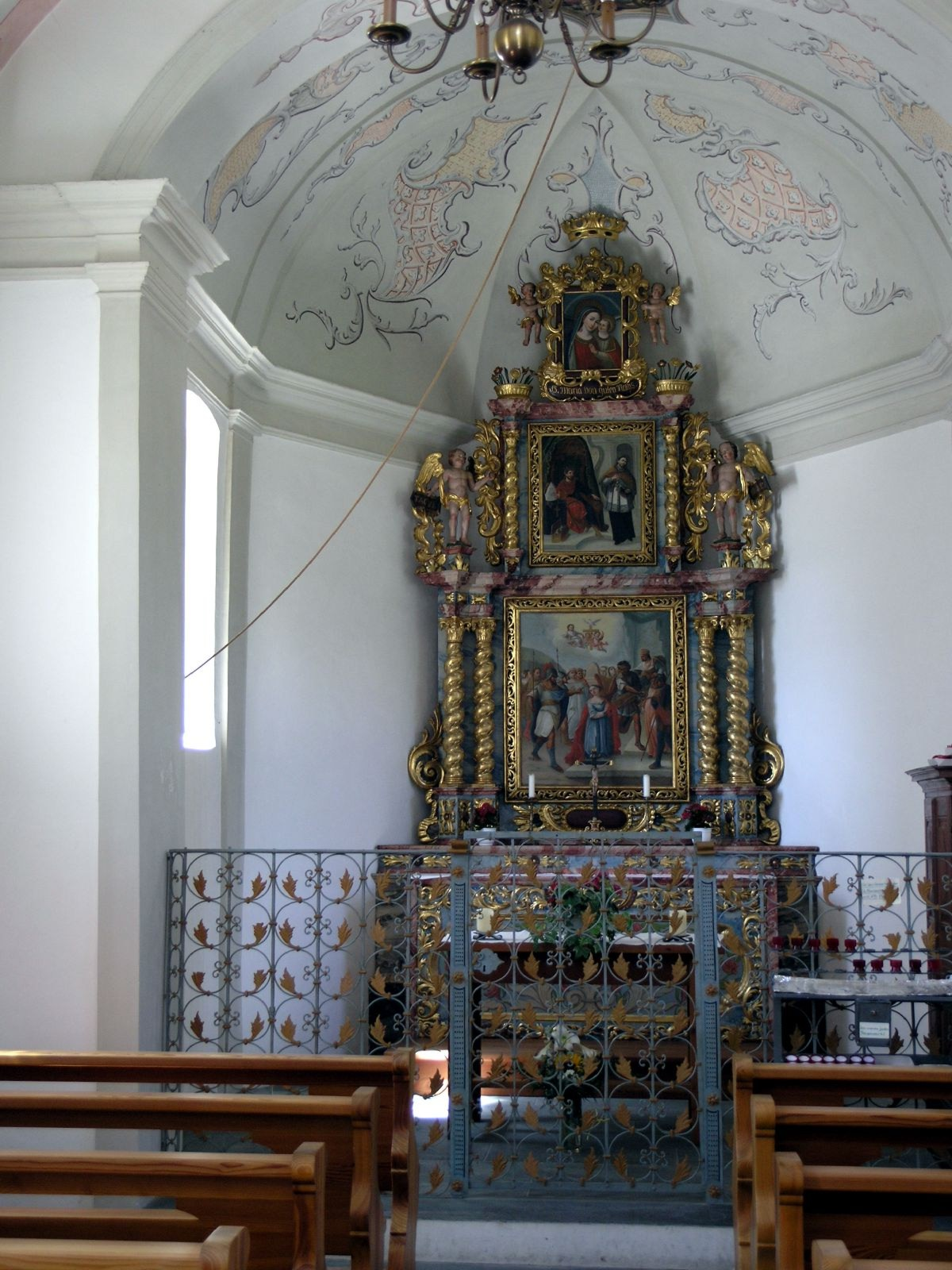
Interior of the Margaret chapel

From the 2000 census in Münster, 354 or 77.8% were Roman Catholic, while 24 or 5.3% belonged to the Swiss Reformed Church. Of the rest of the population, there were 12 members of an Orthodox church (or about 2.64% of the population). There were 29 (or about 6.37% of the population) who were Islamic. 5 (or about 1.10% of the population) belonged to no church, are agnostic or atheist, and 31 individuals (or about 6.81% of the population) did not answer the question.

From the 2000 census in Geschinen, 56 or 86.2% were Roman Catholic, while 6 or 9.2% belonged to the Swiss Reformed Church. 3 (or about 4.62% of the population) belonged to no church, are agnostic or atheist.

== Education ==
In Münster about 164 or (36.0%) of the population have completed non-mandatory upper secondary education, and 33 or (7.3%) have completed additional higher education (either university or a Fachhochschule). Of the 33 who completed tertiary schooling, 72.7% were Swiss men, 18.2% were Swiss women.

As of 2000, there were 131 students in Münster who came from another municipality, while 17 residents attended schools outside the municipality.

Münster is home to the Regionalbibliothek Obergoms library. The library has (as of 2008) 6,384 books or other media, and loaned out 11,748 items in the same year. It was open a total of 156 days with average of 6 hours per week during that year.

In Geschinen about 21 or (32.3%) of the population have completed non-mandatory upper secondary education, and 5 or (7.7%) have completed additional higher education (either university or a Fachhochschule). Of the 5 who completed tertiary schooling, 80.0% were Swiss men, 0.0% were Swiss women. As of 2000, there were 8 students from Geschinen who attended schools outside the municipality.
