= Blitzingen =

- Former municipality
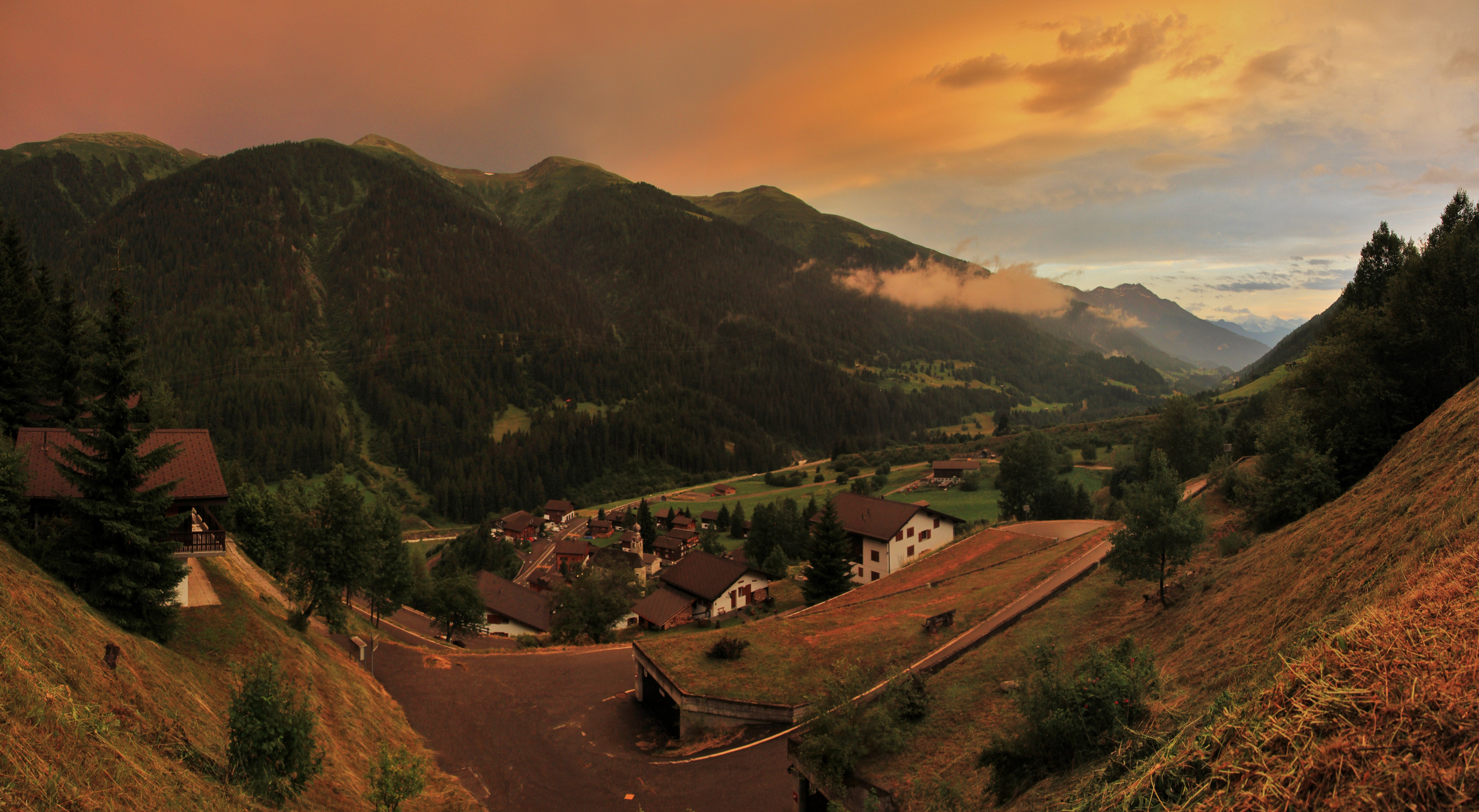
- Blitzingen village

- Coat of arms
- Location of Blitzingen
- Location within Switzerland Location within Canton of Valais
- Coordinates: 46°26′N 8°12′E
- Country: Switzerland
- Canton: Valais
- District: Goms

Government
  - Mayor: Erwin Ritz

Area
  - Total: 11.8 km^{2} (4.6 sq mi)
- Elevation: 1,290 m (4,230 ft)

Population (December 2002)
  - Total: 90
  - Density: 7.6/km^{2} (20/sq mi)
- Time zone: UTC+01:00 (CET)
  - Summer (DST): UTC+02:00 (CEST)
- Postal code: 3989
- SFOS number: 6055
- ISO 3166 code: CH-VS
- Surrounded by: Bellwald, Ernen, Grafschaft, Niederwald
- Website: www.gemeinde-goms.ch

Blitzingen is a former municipality in the district of Goms in the canton of Valais in Switzerland. On 1 January 2017 the former municipalities of Blitzingen, Grafschaft, Münster-Geschinen, Niederwald and Reckingen-Gluringen merged into the municipality of Goms.

== History ==
Blitzingen is first mentioned in 1203 as Blicingen.

== Geography ==
Blitzingen had an area, as of 2011, of 11.8 square kilometers (4.6 mi^{2}). Of this area, 36.7% is used for agricultural purposes, while 27.3% is forested. Of the rest of the land, 1.7% is settled (buildings or roads) and 34.3% is unproductive land.

It consists of the village of Blitzingen and the hamlets of Ammere, Bodme, Wiler and Gadme.

== Coat of arms ==
The blazon of the municipal coat of arms is Azure, issuant from a cliff Vert a flag per fess Gules and Argent two Crosses couped counterchanged staffed of the third and finialed Or, issuant from sinister a Thunderbolt Or, in Chief two Mullets Or. The lightning bolt (German: blitz) may be an example of canting arms.

== Demographics ==
Blitzingen had a population (as of 2015) of 90. As of 2008, 24.4% of the population are resident foreign nationals. Over the last 10 years (1999–2009 ) the population has changed at a rate of -24%. It has changed at a rate of -4.8% due to migration and at a rate of -14.4% due to births and deaths.

Most of the population (as of 2000) speaks German (92 or 92.9%) as their first language with the rest speaking Serbo-Croatian

As of 2008, the gender distribution of the population was 51.9% male and 48.1% female. The population was made up of 26 Swiss men (32.9% of the population) and 15 (19.0%) non-Swiss men. There were 33 Swiss women (41.8%) and 5 (6.3%) non-Swiss women. Of the population in the municipality 44 or about 44.4% were born in Blitzingen and lived there in 2000. There were 21 or 21.2% who were born in the same canton, while 11 or 11.1% were born somewhere else in Switzerland, and 21 or 21.2% were born outside of Switzerland.

The age distribution of the population (as of 2000) is children and teenagers (0–19 years old) make up 23.2% of the population, while adults (20–64 years old) make up 49.5% and seniors (over 64 years old) make up 27.3%.

As of 2000, there were 37 people who were single and never married in the municipality. There were 51 married individuals, 8 widows or widowers and 3 individuals who are divorced.

As of 2000, there were 42 private households in the municipality, and an average of 2.3 persons per household. There were 15 households that consist of only one person and 2 households with five or more people. Out of a total of 44 households that answered this question, 34.1% were households made up of just one person and there was 1 adult who lived with their parents. Of the rest of the households, there are 10 married couples without children, 14 married couples with children There were 2 households that were made up of unrelated people and 2 households that were made up of some sort of institution or another collective housing.

In 2000 there were 51 single family homes (or 57.3% of the total) out of a total of 89 inhabited buildings. There were 30 multi-family buildings (33.7%), along with 2 multi-purpose buildings that were mostly used for housing (2.2%) and 6 other use buildings (commercial or industrial) that also had some housing (6.7%).

In 2000, a total of 42 apartments (21.5% of the total) were permanently occupied, while 140 apartments (71.8%) were seasonally occupied and 13 apartments (6.7%) were empty. The vacancy rate for the municipality, in 2010, was 3.02%.

The historical population is given in the following chart:

== Sights ==
The entire hamlet of Ammere / Gadme /Wiler and the hamlet of Bodmen are designated as part of the Inventory of Swiss Heritage Sites.

== Politics ==
In the 2007 federal election the most popular party was the CVP which received 59.26% of the vote. The next three most popular parties were the SP (21.69%), the SVP (10.05%) and the Green Party (4.23%). In the federal election, a total of 28 votes were cast, and the voter turnout was 50.9%.

In the 2009 Conseil d'État/Staatsrat election a total of 23 votes were cast, of which 5 or about 21.7% were invalid. The voter participation was 44.2%, which is much less than the cantonal average of 54.67%. In the 2007 Swiss Council of States election a total of 28 votes were cast, of which 2 or about 7.1% were invalid. The voter participation was 50.9%, which is much less than the cantonal average of 59.88%.

== Economy ==
As of 2010, Blitzingen had an unemployment rate of 0.7%. As of 2008, there were 11 people employed in the primary economic sector and about 5 businesses involved in this sector. 4 people were employed in the secondary sector and there were 2 businesses in this sector. 19 people were employed in the tertiary sector, with 5 businesses in this sector. There were 49 residents of the municipality who were employed in some capacity, of which females made up 40.8% of the workforce.

In 2008 the total number of full-time equivalent jobs was 29. The number of jobs in the primary sector was 7, all of which were in agriculture. The number of jobs in the secondary sector was 3, all of which were in manufacturing. The number of jobs in the tertiary sector was 19. In the tertiary sector; 1 was in the sale or repair of motor vehicles and 16 or 84.2% were in a hotel or restaurant.

In 2000, there were 24 workers who commuted away from the municipality. Of the working population, 6.1% used public transportation to get to work, and 46.9% used a private car.

== Religion ==
From the 2000 census, 81 or 81.8% were Roman Catholic, while 2 or 2.0% belonged to the Swiss Reformed Church. Of the rest of the population, there were 9 members of an Orthodox church (or about 9.09% of the population). 4 (or about 4.04% of the population) belonged to no church, are agnostic or atheist, and 3 individuals (or about 3.03% of the population) did not answer the question.

== Education ==
In Blitzingen about 24 or (24.2%) of the population have completed non-mandatory upper secondary education, and 7 or (7.1%) have completed additional higher education (either university or a Fachhochschule). Of the 7 who completed tertiary schooling, 57.1% were Swiss men.

As of 2000, there were 13 students from Blitzingen who attended schools outside the municipality.

== Transport ==
The village is served by Blitzingen railway station.
