= Goms District =

Coordinates: 46.45°N 8.3°E

Goms Bezirk Goms
- District
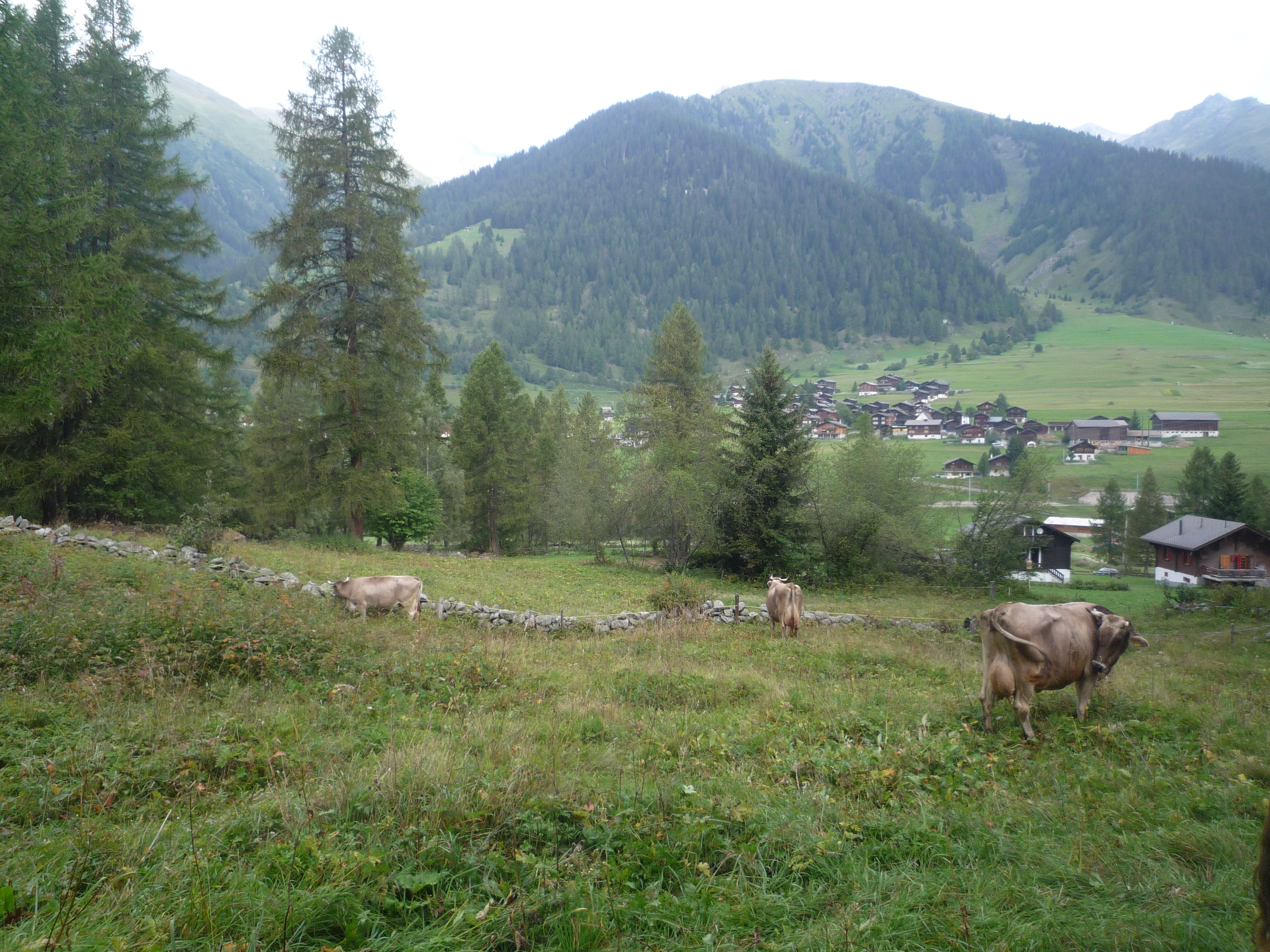
- Landscape of Goms, here the village of Reckingen

- Flag Coat of arms
- Country: Switzerland
- Canton: Valais
- Seat: Münster

Area
  - Total: 588.3 km^{2} (227.1 sq mi)

Population (2020)
  - Total: 4,377
  - Density: 7.440/km^{2} (19.27/sq mi)
- Time zone: UTC+1 (CET)
  - Summer (DST): UTC+2 (CEST)
- Municipalities: 8

Goms (French: District de Conches) is a district of the canton of Valais in Switzerland. It covers a larger area than its geographical counterpart, the geographical region of Goms, namely the upper most part of the Rhône valley between its source and Brig. It has a population of 4,377 (as of 31 December 2020).

== Municipalities ==
It comprises the following municipalities:

Municipality	Population (31 December 2020)	Area km^{2}
Bellwald	354	13.69
Binn	127	65.03
Ernen	518	35.38
Fiesch	909	11.26
Fieschertal	326	172.96
Goms	1,160	129.0
Lax	329	5.02
Obergoms	654	155.83
Total	4,377	588.11

== Coat of arms and flag ==
The blazon of the municipal coat of arms and flag is Per fess Gules and Argent, two Crosses pattee counterchanged.

== Demographics ==
Goms has a population (as of December 2020) of 4,377. Most of the population (as of 2000) speaks German (4,401 or 92.8%) as their first language, Serbo-Croatian is the second most common (179 or 3.8%) and Albanian is the third (41 or 0.9%). There are 29 people who speak French, 12 people who speak Italian.

As of 2008, the gender distribution of the population was 51.0% male and 49.0% female. The population was made up of 2,113 Swiss men (44.8% of the population) and 292 (6.2%) non-Swiss men. There were 2,036 Swiss women (43.2%) and 274 (5.8%) non-Swiss women. Of the population in the district 2,454 or about 51.7% were born in Goms and lived there in 2000. There were 1,179 or 24.9% who were born in the same canton, while 488 or 10.3% were born somewhere else in Switzerland, and 529 or 11.2% were born outside of Switzerland.

As of 2000, there were 1,896 people who were single and never married in the district. There were 2,434 married individuals, 309 widows or widowers and 104 individuals who are divorced.

There were 609 households that consist of only one person and 145 households with five or more people. Out of a total of 1,969 households that answered this question, 30.9% were households made up of just one person and there were 23 adults who lived with their parents. Of the rest of the households, there are 520 married couples without children, 638 married couples with children There were 76 single parents with a child or children. There were 45 households that were made up of unrelated people and 58 households that were made up of some sort of institution or another collective housing.

The historical population is given in the following chart:

== Mergers and name changes ==
On 1 October 2000 the former municipalities of Biel (VS), Ritzingen and Selkingen merged to form the new municipality of Grafschaft, and the Kommunanz of Gluringen/Ritzingen changed its name to Kommunanz Gluringen/Grafschaft.

On 1 October 2004 the former municipalities of Geschinen and Münster (VS) merged to form the new municipality of Münster-Geschinen, the former municipalities of Gluringen and Reckingen (VS) merged to form the new municipality of Reckingen-Gluringen and the former municipalities of Steinhaus, Ausserbinn and Mühlebach merged into the municipality of Ernen.

On 1 January 2009 the former municipalities of Ulrichen, Obergesteln and Oberwald merged to form the new municipality of Obergoms.

On 1 January 2017 the former municipalities of Blitzingen, Grafschaft, Münster-Geschinen, Niederwald and Reckingen-Gluringen merged to form the new municipality of Goms.

== Politics ==
In the 2007 federal election the most popular party was the CVP which received 62.28% of the vote. The next three most popular parties were the SVP (17.54%), the SP (12.83%) and the FDP (4.76%). In the federal election, a total of 2,014 votes were cast, and the voter turnout was 55.3%.

In the 2009 Conseil d'État/Staatsrat election a total of 1,833 votes were cast, of which 169 or about 9.2% were invalid. The voter participation was 52.5%, which is similar to the cantonal average of 54.67%. In the 2007 Swiss Council of States election a total of 2,005 votes were cast, of which 60 or about 3.0% were invalid. The voter participation was 56.1%, which is similar to the cantonal average of 59.88%.

== Religion ==
From the 2000 census, 4,029 or 84.9% were Roman Catholic, while 243 or 5.1% belonged to the Swiss Reformed Church. Of the rest of the population, there were 160 members of an Orthodox church (or about 3.37% of the population), and there were 17 individuals (or about 0.36% of the population) who belonged to another Christian church. There were 86 (or about 1.81% of the population) who were Islamic. 110 (or about 2.32% of the population) belonged to no church, are agnostic or atheist, and 106 individuals (or about 2.23% of the population) did not answer the question.

== Education ==
In Goms about 1,712 or (36.1%) of the population have completed non-mandatory upper secondary education, and 346 or (7.3%) have completed additional higher education (either University or a Fachhochschule). Of the 346 who completed tertiary schooling, 71.4% were Swiss men, 12.7% were Swiss women, 9.2% were non-Swiss men and 6.6% were non-Swiss women.

== Sports ==
Goms cross-country skiing trail: Goms is popular for cross-country skiing and offers a network of cross-country skiing trails of around 100 km.
