= Niederwald, Switzerland =

Niederwald
- Former municipality
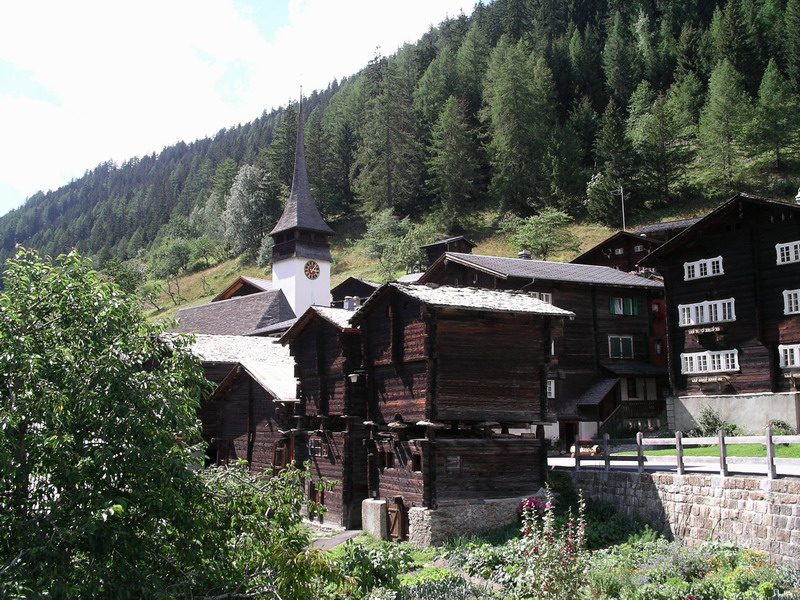

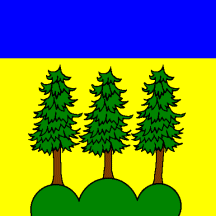
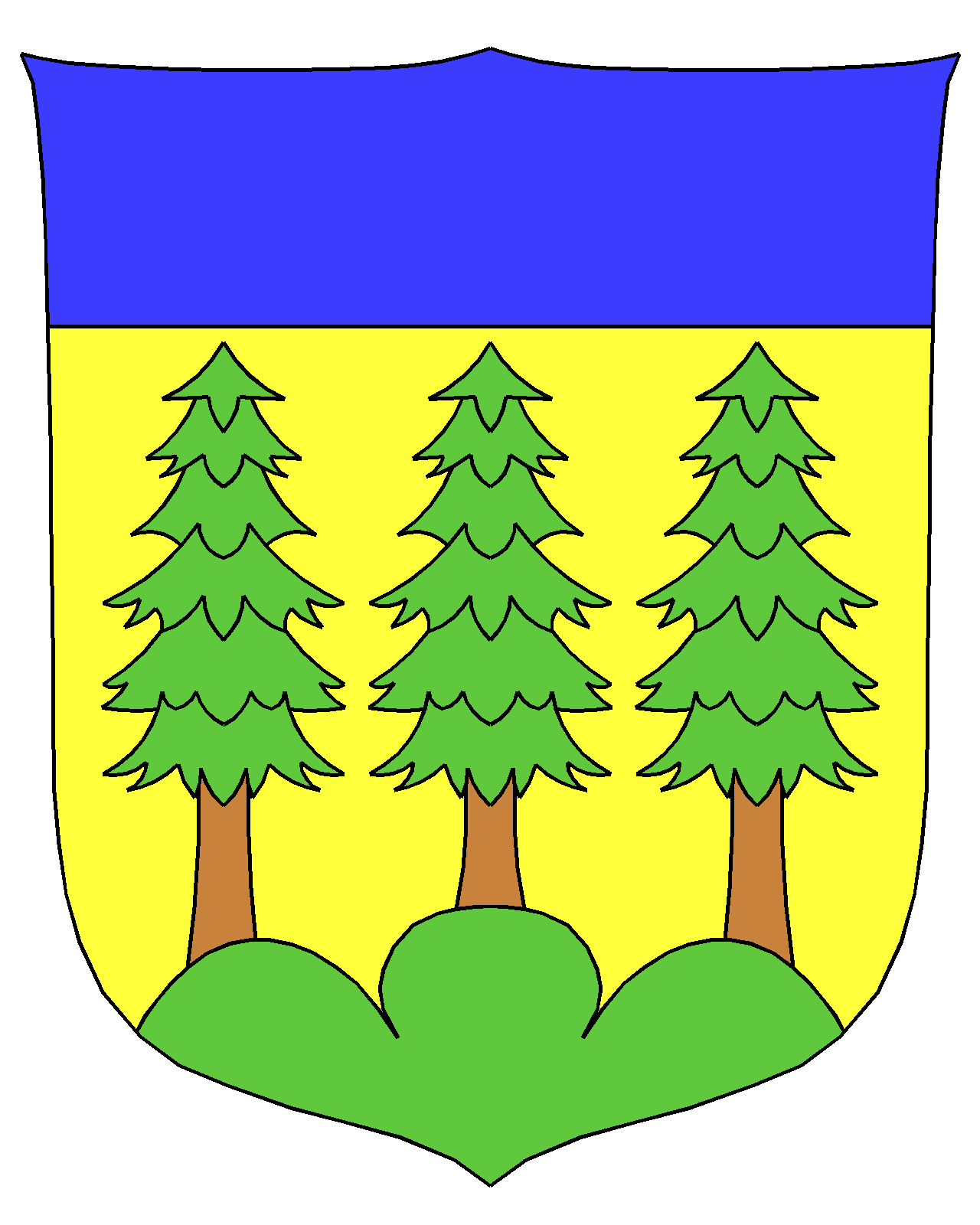
- Flag Coat of arms
- Location of Niederwald
- Location within Switzerland Location within Canton of Valais
- Coordinates: 46°26′N 8°11′E
- Country: Switzerland
- Canton: Valais
- District: Goms

Government
  - Mayor: Martin Mutter

Area
  - Total: 4.7 km^{2} (1.8 sq mi)
- Elevation: 1,251 m (4,104 ft)

Population (December 2002)
  - Total: 66
  - Density: 14/km^{2} (36/sq mi)
- Time zone: UTC+01:00 (CET)
  - Summer (DST): UTC+02:00 (CEST)
- Postal code: 3989
- SFOS number: 6064
- ISO 3166 code: CH-VS
- Surrounded by: Bellwald, Blitzingen, Ernen
- Website: www.gemeinde-goms.ch

Niederwald is a former municipality in the district of Goms in the canton of Valais in Switzerland. On 1 January 2017 the former municipalities of Niederwald, Blitzingen, Grafschaft, Münster-Geschinen and Reckingen-Gluringen merged into the new municipality of Goms.

== History ==
Niederwald is first mentioned in 1526 as Zniderwaldt.

== Geography ==
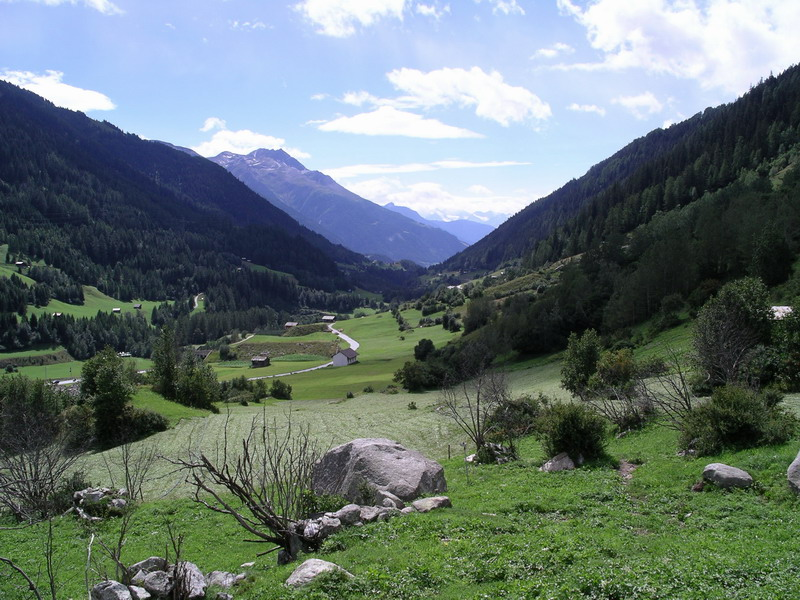
View of the valley from Niederwald

Niederwald has an area, as of 2011, of 4.7 square kilometers (1.8 mi^{2}). Of this area, 34.8% is used for agricultural purposes, while 43.8% is forested. Of the rest of the land, 3.0% is settled (buildings or roads) and 18.4% is unproductive land.

The municipality is located above the Fiesch valley and along the old highway which ran from Ernen over the Rhone bridge to the right side of the valley. It consists of the haufendorf village (an irregular, unplanned and quite closely packed village, built around a central square) of Niederwald and the former hamlet of Rottenbrigge.

== Coat of arms ==
The blazon of the municipal coat of arms is Or, on Coupeaux Vert three Pine trees of the same trunked proper, a Chief Azure.

== Demographics ==
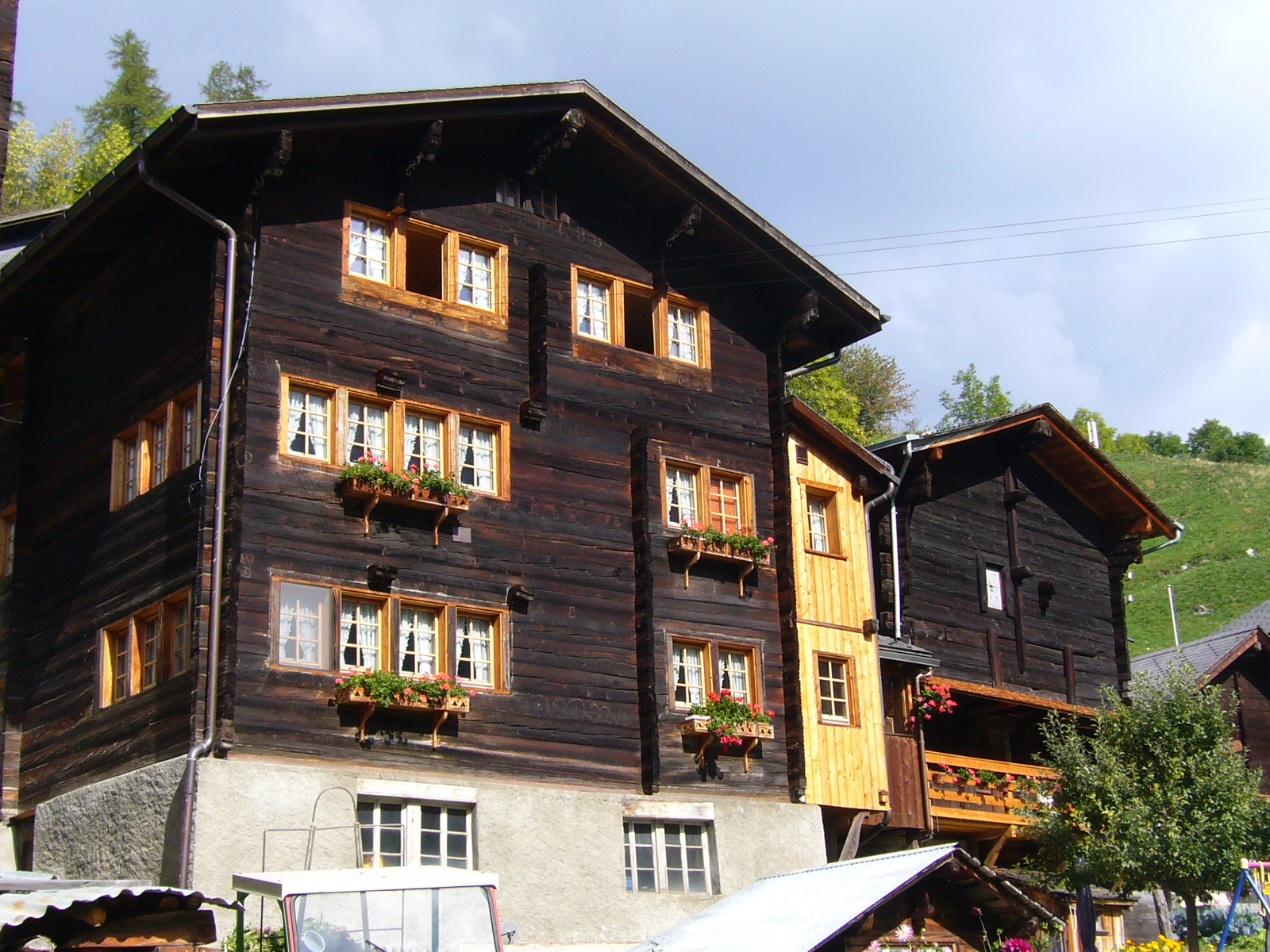
House in Niederwald

Niederwald has a population (as of December 2020) of 45. As of 2008, 6.8% of the population are resident foreign nationals. Over the last 10 years (1999–2009 ) the population has changed at a rate of -47.5%. It has changed at a rate of -28.8% due to migration and at a rate of -10% due to births and deaths.

Most of the population (as of 2000) speaks German (65 or 92.9%) as their first language, French is the second most common (3 or 4.3%) and Serbo-Croatian is the third (2 or 2.9%).

As of 2008, the gender distribution of the population was 49.7% male and 50.3% female. The population was made up of 212 Swiss men (44.1% of the population) and 27 (5.6%) non-Swiss men. There were 216 Swiss women (44.9%) and 26 (5.4%) non-Swiss women. Of the population in the municipality 39 or about 55.7% were born in Niederwald and lived there in 2000. There were 19 or 27.1% who were born in the same canton, while 5 or 7.1% were born somewhere else in Switzerland, and 7 or 10.0% were born outside of Switzerland.

The age distribution of the population (as of 2000) is children and teenagers (0–19 years old) make up 18.6% of the population, while adults (20–64 years old) make up 58.6% and seniors (over 64 years old) make up 22.9%.

As of 2000, there were 27 people who were single and never married in the municipality. There were 39 married individuals, 4 widows or widowers and individuals who are divorced.

As of 2000, there were 33 private households in the municipality, and an average of 2.1 persons per household. There were 12 households that consist of only one person and 1 households with five or more people. Out of a total of 33 households that answered this question, 36.4% were households made up of just one person. Of the rest of the households, there are 11 married couples without children, 9 married couples with children There was 1 household that was made up of unrelated people.

In 2000 there were 30 single family homes (or 65.2% of the total) out of a total of 46 inhabited buildings. There were 5 multi-family buildings (10.9%), along with 7 multi-purpose buildings that were mostly used for housing (15.2%) and 4 other use buildings (commercial or industrial) that also had some housing (8.7%).

In 2000, a total of 32 apartments (54.2% of the total) were permanently occupied, while 24 apartments (40.7%) were seasonally occupied and 3 apartments (5.1%) were empty.

The historical population is given in the following chart:

== Notable residents ==
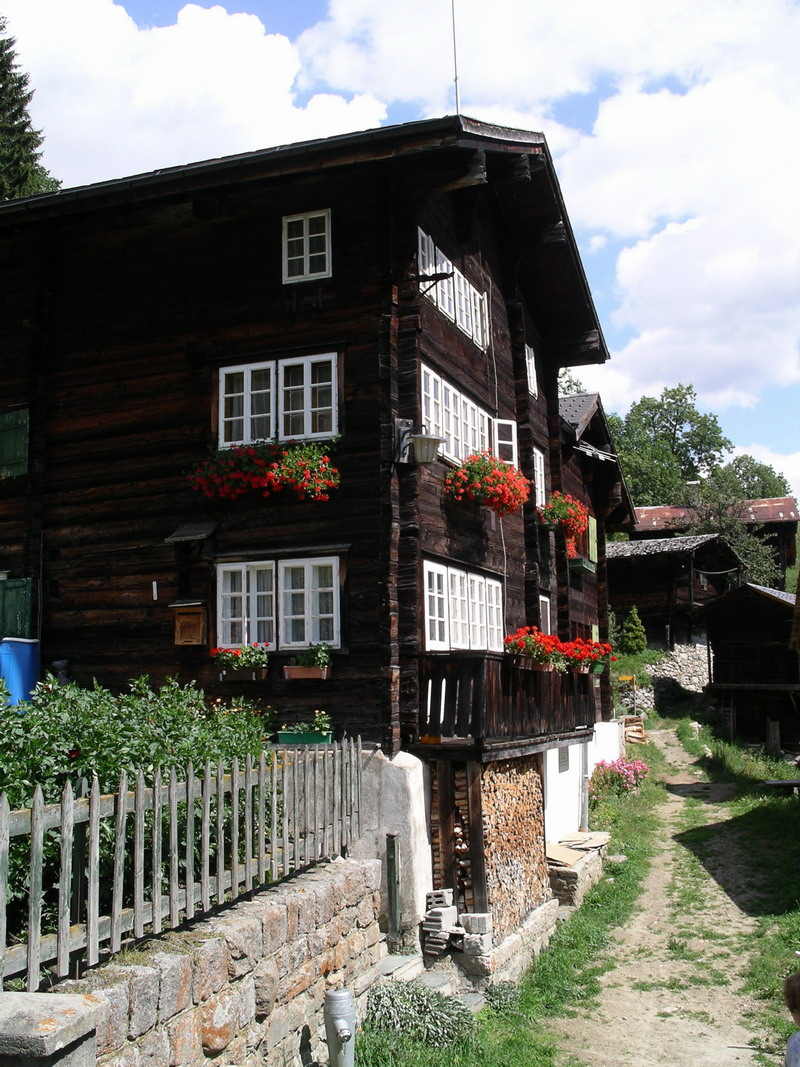
César Ritz's childhood home

It was home to famous hotelier César Ritz, who is buried in the local cemetery.

== Sights ==
The entire village of Niederwald is designated as part of the Inventory of Swiss Heritage Sites.

== Politics ==
In the 2007 federal election the most popular party was the CVP which received 75.3% of the vote. The next three most popular parties were the SP (9.64%), the FDP (8.43%) and the Green Party (4.82%). In the federal election, a total of 24 votes were cast, and the voter turnout was 53.3%.

In the 2009 Conseil d'État/Staatsrat election a total of 22 votes were cast, of which or about 0.0% were invalid. The voter participation was 61.1%, which is much more than the cantonal average of 54.67%. In the 2007 Swiss Council of States election a total of 24 votes were cast, of which or about 0.0% were invalid. The voter participation was 58.5%, which is similar to the cantonal average of 59.88%.

== Economy ==
As of 2010, Niederwald had an unemployment rate of 0.5%. As of 2008, there were 2 people employed in the primary economic sector and about 1 business involved in this sector. 24 people were employed in the secondary sector and there were 2 businesses in this sector. 3 people were employed in the tertiary sector, with 1 business in this sector. There were 35 residents of the municipality who were employed in some capacity, of which females made up 45.7% of the workforce.

In 2008 the total number of full-time equivalent jobs was 27. The number of jobs in the primary sector was 2, all of which were in agriculture. The number of jobs in the secondary sector was 22 of which 21 or (95.5%) were in manufacturing and 1 was in construction. The number of jobs in the tertiary sector was 3. In the tertiary sector all 3 were in a hotel or restaurant.

In 2000, there were 39 workers who commuted into the municipality and 18 workers who commuted away. The municipality is a net importer of workers, with about 2.2 workers entering the municipality for every one leaving. Of the working population, 17.1% used public transportation to get to work, and 37.1% used a private car.

== Religion ==
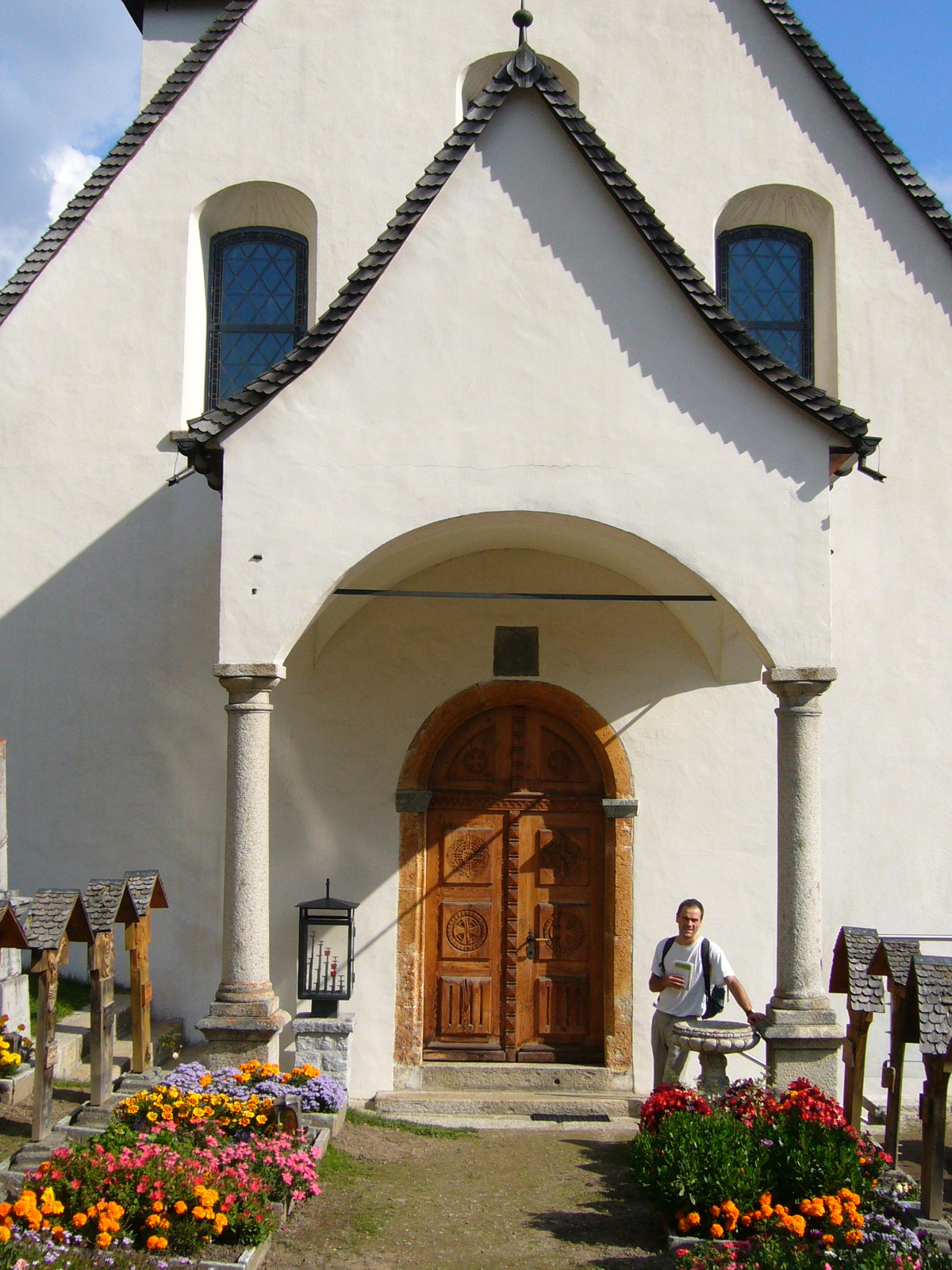
Niederwald village church

From the 2000 census, 65 or 92.9% were Roman Catholic, while or 0.0% belonged to the Swiss Reformed Church. Of the rest of the population, there were 2 members of an Orthodox church (or about 2.86% of the population). 3 (or about 4.29% of the population) belonged to no church, are agnostic or atheist.

== Education ==
In Niederwald about 28 or (40.0%) of the population have completed non-mandatory upper secondary education, and 3 or (4.3%) have completed additional higher education (either university or a Fachhochschule). Of the 3 who completed tertiary schooling, 66.7% were Swiss men, 0.0% were Swiss women.

As of 2000, there were 6 students from Niederwald who attended schools outside the municipality.
