= Fieschertal =

- Municipality
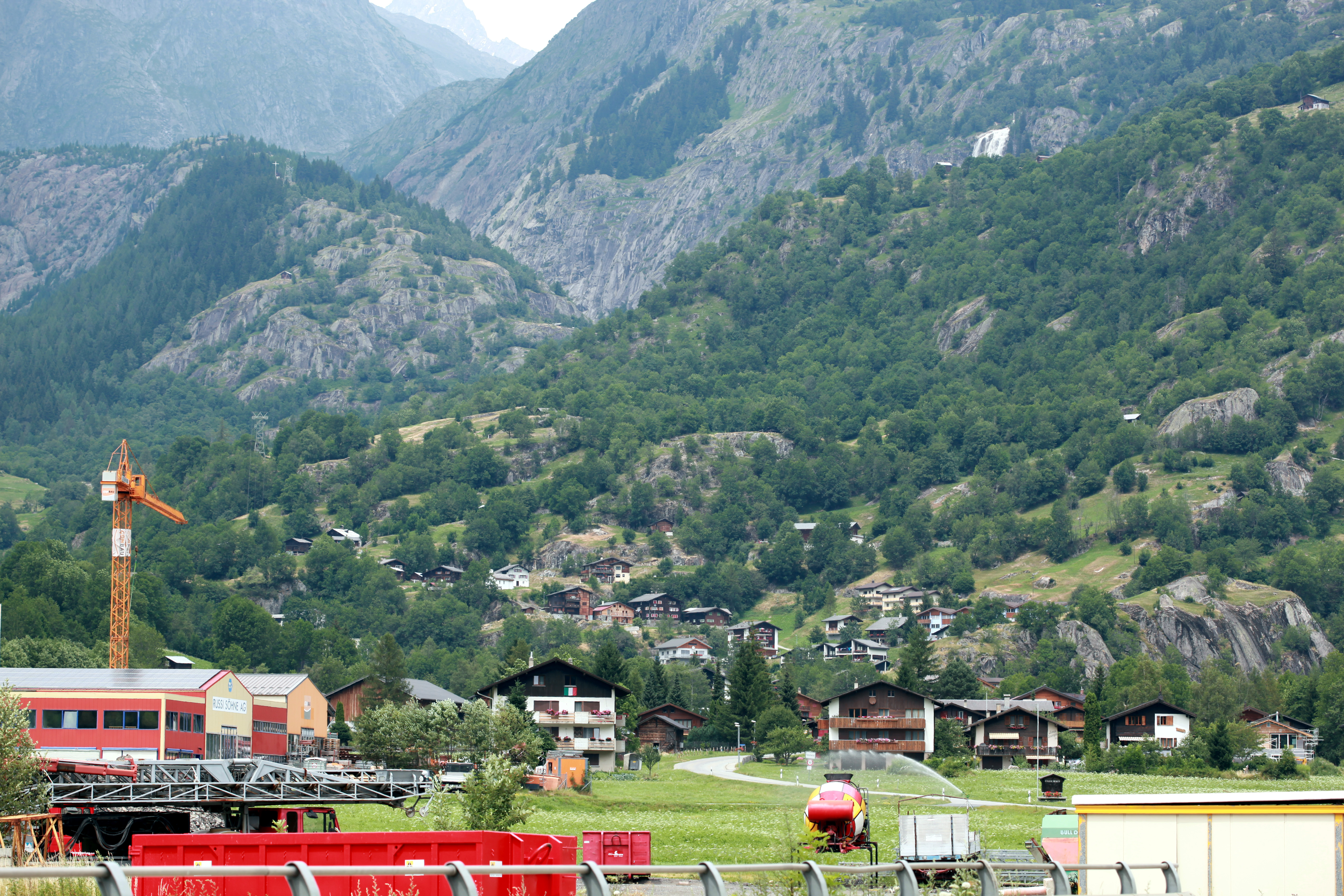
- Fieschertal village

- Flag Coat of arms
- Location of Fieschertal
- Location within Switzerland Location within Canton of Valais
- Coordinates: 46°30′N 8°8′E
- Country: Switzerland
- Canton: Valais
- District: Goms

Government
  - Mayor: Daniel Zeiter

Area
  - Total: 173.0 km^{2} (66.8 sq mi)
- Elevation: 1,108 m (3,635 ft)

Population (December 2002)
  - Total: 280
  - Density: 1.6/km^{2} (4.2/sq mi)
- Time zone: UTC+01:00 (CET)
  - Summer (DST): UTC+02:00 (CEST)
- Postal code: 3984
- SFOS number: 6058
- ISO 3166 code: CH-VS
- Surrounded by: Bellwald, Betten, Blatten (Lötschen), Fiesch, Grafschaft, Grindelwald (BE), Guttannen (BE), Lauterbrunnen (BE), Münster-Geschinen, Naters, Reckingen-Gluringen
- Website: www.fieschertal.ch

Fieschertal (Swiss Standard German pronunciation: [ˈfiːʃərˌtaːl]) is a village and municipality in the district of Goms in the canton of Valais in Switzerland. Besides the village of Fieschertal, the municipality includes the nearby hamlets of Wichul, Zer Flie, and Wirbul.

== History ==
Fieschertal is first mentioned in 1351 as vallis de Vies.

== Geography ==
The village of Fieschertal is located in the valley of the Wysswasser, a tributary of the Rhone that drains the Fiescher glacier. In addition to the village, the municipality includes a number of nearby hamlets, including Wichul, Zer Flie, and Wirbul. However, most of the municipality's area comprises sparsely inhabited high mountain landscape and is heavily glaciated, including most of the Aletsch glacier and its tributary glaciers, together with the whole of the Fiescher glacier. The mountains of the Jungfrau, Mönch, Fiescherhorn, Agassizhorn, Finsteraarhorn, Oberaarhorn, Wasenhorn, Grunhorn, Wannenhorn, Eggishorn, Aletschhorn, Mittaghorn, and Gletscherhorn are all either within or on the boundary of the municipality, as is the Märjelen lake. The Jungfraujoch, with the Top of Europe tourist attraction, lies just inside the northern boundary of the municipality, but access is exclusively from communities to the north.

Fieschertal has an area, as of 2011, of 173 square kilometers (67 mi^{2}). Of this area, 3.0% is used for agricultural purposes, while 2.2% is forested. Of the rest of the land, 0.1% is settled (buildings or roads), and 94.7% is unproductive land.

== Coat of arms ==
The blazon of the municipal coat of arms is Per fess Or a rose Gules slipped and leaved Vert centered of the first and Vert on a pile chevronny Azure and Argent a pallet wavy of the last.

== Demographics ==
Fieschertal has a population (as of December 2020) of 326. As of 2008, 4.9% of the population are resident foreign nationals. Over the last 10 years (1999–2009) the population has changed at a rate of 7%. It has changed at a rate of 4.1% due to migration and at a rate of -1.5% due to births and deaths.

Most of the population (as of 2000) speaks German (251 or 98.4%) as their first language, Dutch is the second-most common (2 or 0.8%) and French and Italian are the third (1 or 0.4% each).

As of 2008, the gender distribution of the population was 50.3% male and 49.7% female. The population was made up of 134 Swiss men (46.2% of the population) and 12 (4.1%) non-Swiss men. There were 133 Swiss women (45.9%) and 11 (3.8%) non-Swiss women. Of the population in the municipality 157 or about 61.6% were born in Fieschertal and lived there in 2000. There were 66 or 25.9% who were born in the same canton, while 15 or 5.9% were born somewhere else in Switzerland, and 10 or 3.9% were born outside of Switzerland.

The age distribution of the population (as of 2000) is children and teenagers (0–19 years old) make up 25.5% of the population, while adults (20–64 years old) make up 58% and seniors (over 64 years old) make up 16.5%.

As of 2000, there were 116 people who were single and never married in the municipality. There were 115 married individuals, 22 widows or widowers and 2 individuals who are divorced.

As of 2000, there were 94 private households in the municipality, and an average of 2.7 persons per household. There were 23 households that consist of only one person and 10 households with five or more people. Out of a total of 95 households that answered this question, 24.2% were households made up of just one person and there were 2 adults who lived with their parents. Of the rest of the households, there are 25 married couples without children, 38 married couples with children There were 5 single parents with a child or children. There was 1 household that was made up of unrelated people and 1 household that was made up of some sort of institution or another collective housing.

In 2000 there were 76 single family homes (or 57.1% of the total) out of a total of 133 inhabited buildings. There were 44 multi-family buildings (33.1%), along with 4 multi-purpose buildings that were mostly used for housing (3.0%) and 9 other use buildings (commercial or industrial) that also had some housing (6.8%).

In 2000, a total of 93 apartments (44.7% of the total) were permanently occupied, while 91 apartments (43.8%) were seasonally occupied and 24 apartments (11.5%) were empty. As of 2009, the construction rate of new housing units was 3.4 new units per 1000 residents.

The historical population is given in the following chart:

== Politics ==
In the 2007 federal election the most popular party was the CVP which received 51.42% of the vote. The next three most popular parties were the SVP (29.67%), the SP (13.31%) and the FDP (3.46%). In the federal election, a total of 149 votes were cast, and the voter turnout was 66.2%.

In the 2009 Conseil d'État/Staatsrat election a total of 171 votes were cast, of which 9 or about 5.3% were invalid. The voter participation was 75.7%, which is much more than the cantonal average of 54.67%. In the 2007 Swiss Council of States election a total of 148 votes were cast, of which 8 or about 5.4% were invalid. The voter participation was 66.4%, which is much more than the cantonal average of 59.88%.

== Economy ==
As of 2010, Fieschertal had an unemployment rate of 2.8%. As of 2008, there were 27 people employed in the primary economic sector and about 13 businesses involved in this sector. 110 people were employed in the secondary sector and there were 5 businesses in this sector. 136 people were employed in the tertiary sector, with 11 businesses in this sector. There were 134 residents of the municipality who were employed in some capacity, of which females made up 43.3% of the workforce.

In 2008 the total number of full-time equivalent jobs was 255. The number of jobs in the primary sector was 17, of which 8 were in agriculture and 9 were in forestry or lumber production. The number of jobs in the secondary sector was 108 of which 21 or (19.4%) were in manufacturing and 87 (80.6%) were in construction. The number of jobs in the tertiary sector was 130. In the tertiary sector; 4 or 3.1% were in wholesale or retail sales or the repair of motor vehicles, 54 or 41.5% were in the movement and storage of goods, 63 or 48.5% were in a hotel or restaurant, 3 or 2.3% were technical professionals or scientists, 2 or 1.5% were in education.

In 2000, there were 80 workers who commuted into the municipality and 86 workers who commuted away. The municipality is a net exporter of workers, with about 1.1 workers leaving the municipality for every one entering. Of the working population, 15.7% used public transportation to get to work, and 56% used a private car.

== Transport ==
A single 3-kilometre-long (1.9-mile) road links Fieschertal village with the village of Fiesch, on the main road up the valley of the Rhone. A PostBus Switzerland service links Fiesch and Fieschertal, providing an interchange with Fiesch station on the Furka-Oberalp line of the Matterhorn Gotthard Bahn (MGB). The bus service runs hourly with some gaps in service.

Some 18 kilometres (11 mi) to the north-west of Fieschertal village, the Jungfraujoch terminus of the Jungfrau railway lies just inside the municipal border. The area between the two, and most of the rest of the municipality, is devoid of any roads or other developed transport modes.

== Religion ==
From the 2000 census, 240 (or 94.1%) were Roman Catholic, while four (or 1.6%) belonged to the Swiss Reformed Church. Three (or about 1.18% of the population) belonged to no church, are agnostic or atheist, and 8 individuals (or about 3.14% of the population) did not answer the question.

== Weather ==
Fieschertal has an average of 98.9 days of rain or snow per year and on average receives 923 mm (36.3 in) of precipitation. The wettest month is October during which time Fieschertal receives an average of 98 mm (3.9 in) of rain or snow. During this month there is precipitation for an average of 7.4 days. The month with the most days of precipitation is May, with an average of 10.1, but with only 95 mm (3.7 in) of rain or snow. The driest month of the year is July with an average of 57 mm (2.2 in) of precipitation over 8.2 days.

== Education ==
In Fieschertal about 95 or (37.3%) of the population have completed non-mandatory upper secondary education, and 11 or (4.3%) have completed additional higher education (either university or a Fachhochschule). Of the 11 who completed tertiary schooling, 81.8% were Swiss men, 0.0% were Swiss women.

As of 2000, there were 37 students from Fieschertal who attended schools outside the municipality.
