= Trützisee =

Lake in Valais, Switzerland

- Location within Canton of Valais Location within Switzerland Location within Alps
- Interactive map of Trützisee
- Location: Geschinen, Valais
- Coordinates: 46°31′17″N 8°15′04″E
- Basin countries: Switzerland
- Surface area: 4.5 ha (11 acres)
- Surface elevation: 2,579 m (8,461 ft)

Trützisee (Swiss Standard German: [ˈtrʏtsiˌzeː]) is a lake above Geschinen in the Canton of Valais, Switzerland.

== See also ==
- List of mountain lakes of Switzerland
