= Grafschaft, Switzerland =

Grafschaft
- Former municipality
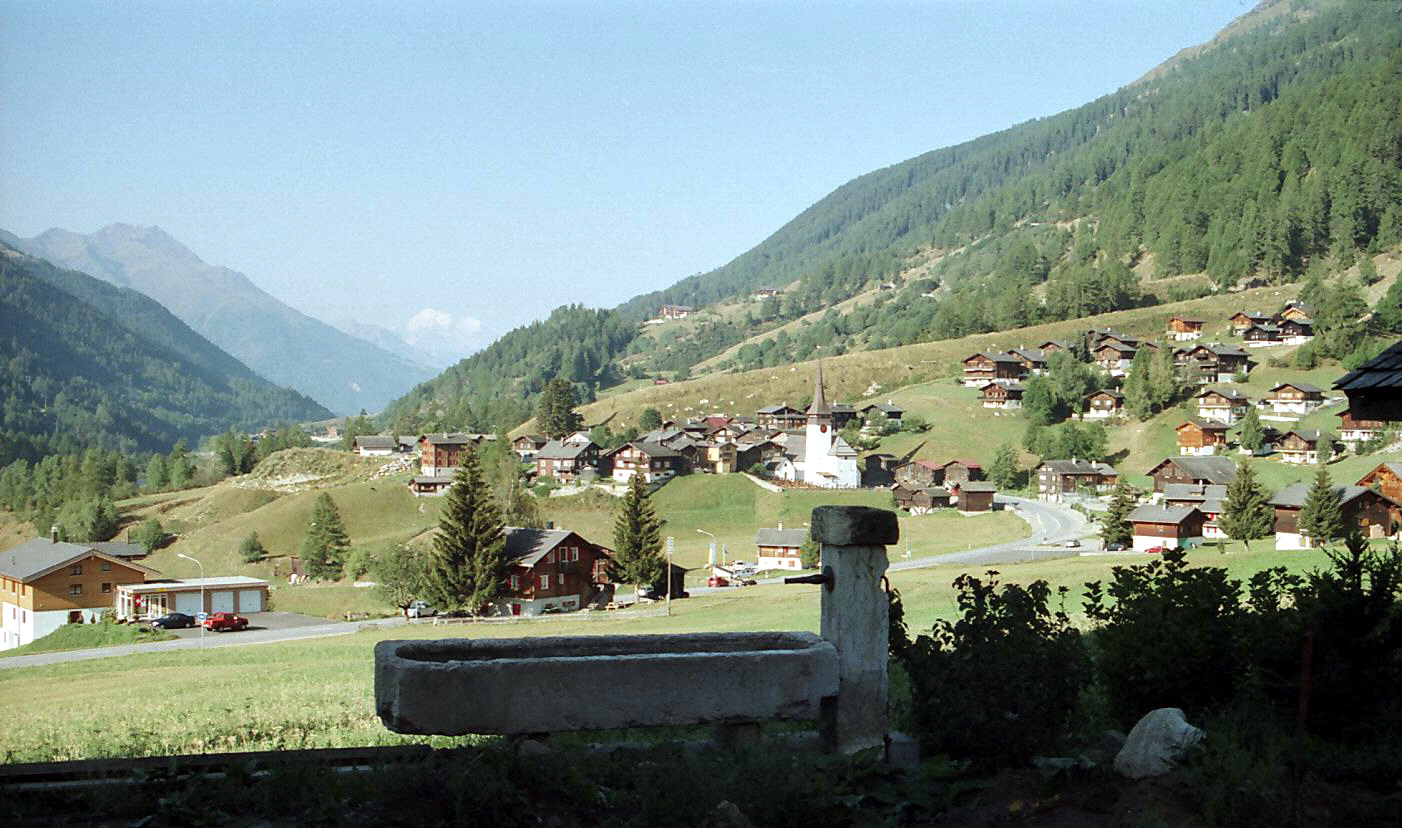

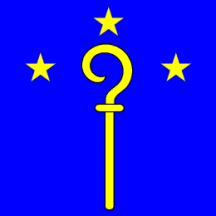
- Flag Coat of arms
- Location of Grafschaft
- Location within Switzerland Location within Canton of Valais
- Coordinates: 46°27′N 8°13′E
- Country: Switzerland
- Canton: Valais
- District: Goms

Government
  - Mayor: Beat Mutter

Area
  - Total: 22.6 km^{2} (8.7 sq mi)
- Elevation: 1,312 m (4,304 ft)

Population (December 2002)
  - Total: 206
  - Density: 9.12/km^{2} (23.6/sq mi)
- Time zone: UTC+01:00 (CET)
  - Summer (DST): UTC+02:00 (CEST)
- Postal code: 3989
- SFOS number: 6073
- ISO 3166 code: CH-VS
- Surrounded by: Bellwald, Blitzingen, Ernen, Fieschertal, Reckingen-Gluringen
- Website: www.gemeinde-goms.ch

Grafschaft is a former municipality in the district of Goms in the canton of Valais in Switzerland. In 2000 the municipality was created with the merger of Biel (VS), Ritzingen and Selkingen. On 1 January 2017 the former municipalities of Grafschaft, Blitzingen, Münster-Geschinen, Niederwald and Reckingen-Gluringen merged into the new municipality of Goms.

== History ==
Grafschaft was created in 2000 through the merger of Biel (VS), Ritzingen and Selkingen. Biel was first mentioned in 1277 as Buele. Starting in the 13th Century, Ritzingen gradually became a municipality. By the 16th Century the traditional practices and pastures of the farmers were finally codified into laws. Selkingen was first mentioned in 1374 as villa de Selgingen.

== Geography ==
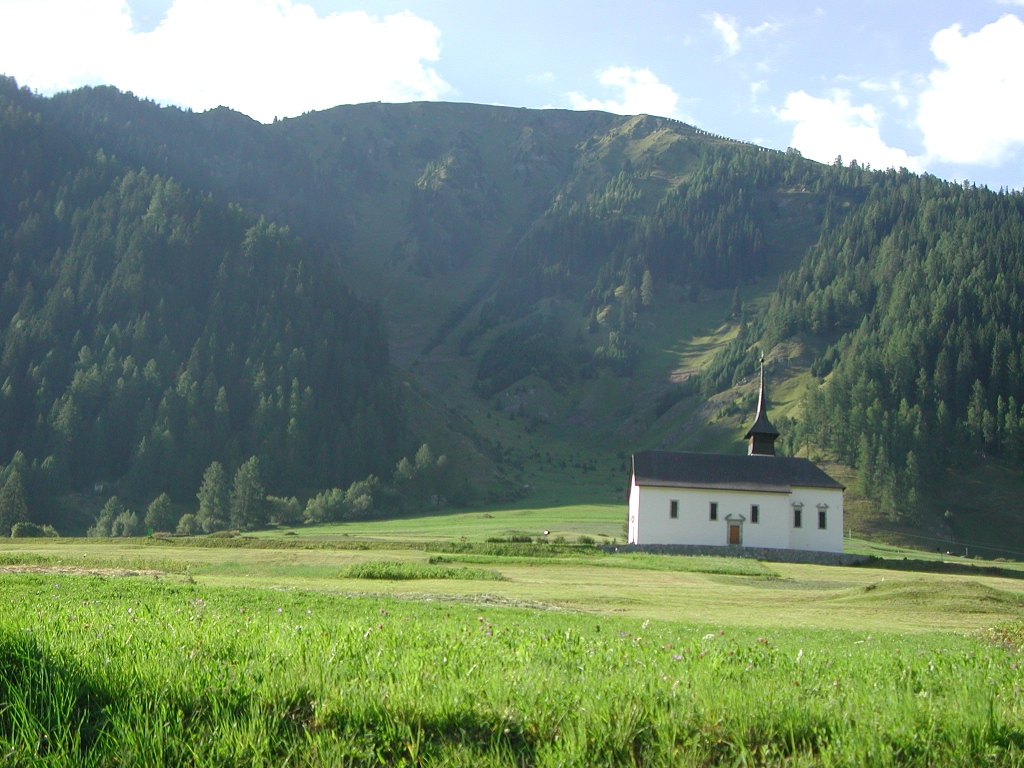
Muttergottes chapel outside Ritzinger

Grafschaft had an area, as of 2011, of 22.6 square kilometers (8.7 mi^{2}). Of this area, 27.7% is used for agricultural purposes, while 20.4% is forested. Of the rest of the land, 1.6% is settled (buildings or roads) and 50.4% is unproductive land.

== Coat of arms ==
The blazon of the municipal coat of arms is Azure a Crozier Or issuiant from base surrounded with three Mullets of five of the same.

== Demographics ==
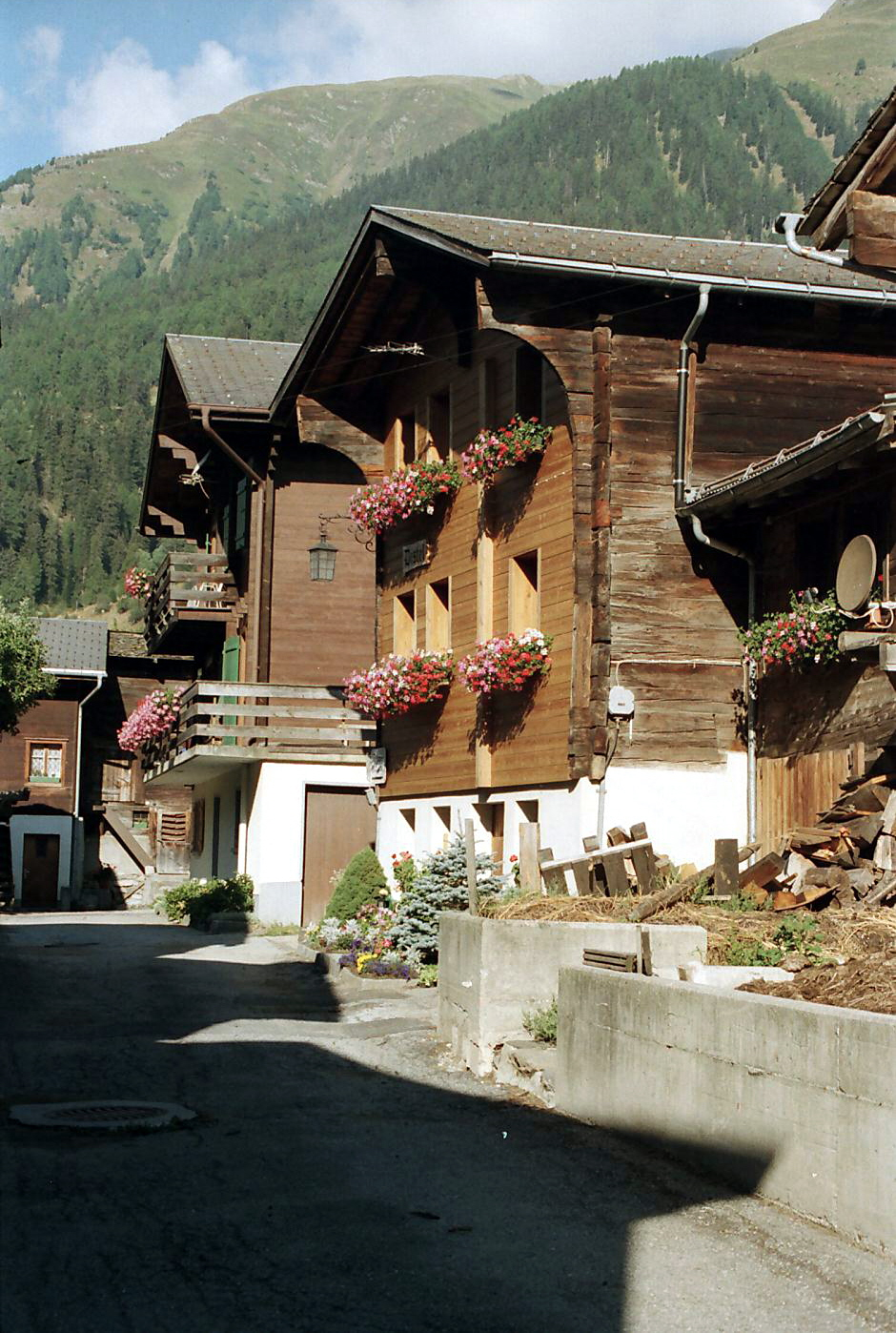
Ritzingen village

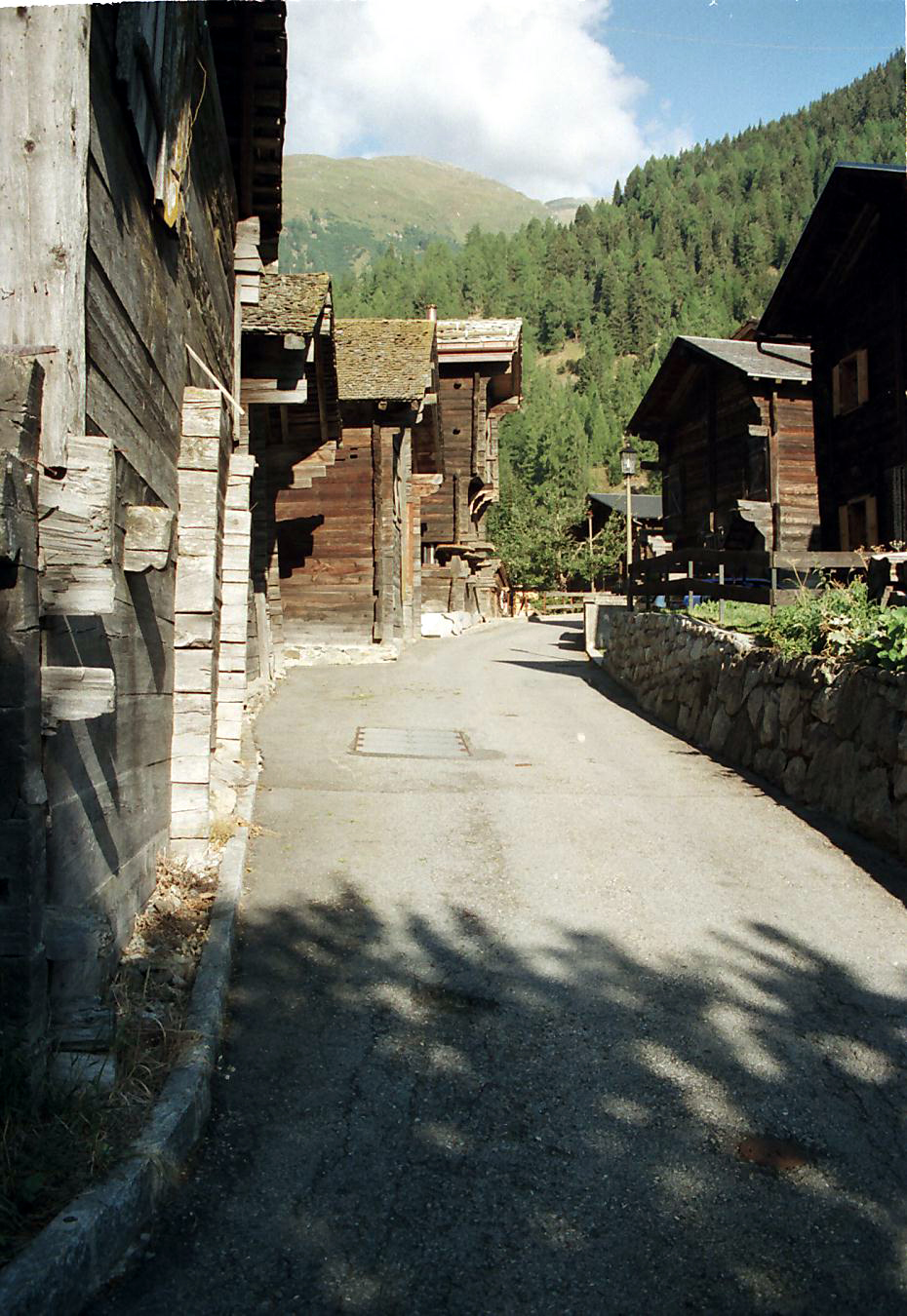
Ritzingen village

Grafschaft had a population (as of 2015) of 206. As of 2008, 7.6% of the population are resident foreign nationals. Over the last 10 years (1999–2009 ) the population has changed at a rate of -4.3%. It has changed at a rate of 3.4% due to migration and at a rate of -3.4% due to births and deaths.

Most of the population (as of 2000) speaks German (186 or 96.9%) as their first language, Serbo-Croatian is the second most common (4 or 2.1%) and French is the third (1 or 0.5%).

As of 2008, the gender distribution of the population was 47.7% male and 52.3% female. The population was made up of 90 Swiss men (45.2% of the population) and 5 (2.5%) non-Swiss men. There were 93 Swiss women (46.7%) and 11 (5.5%) non-Swiss women. Of the population in the municipality 109 or about 56.8% were born in Grafschaft and lived there in 2000. There were 53 or 27.6% who were born in the same canton, while 15 or 7.8% were born somewhere else in Switzerland, and 10 or 5.2% were born outside of Switzerland.

The age distribution of the population (as of 2000) is children and teenagers (0–19 years old) make up 22.4% of the population, while adults (20–64 years old) make up 54.7% and seniors (over 64 years old) make up 22.9%.

As of 2000, there were 73 people who were single and never married in the municipality. There were 102 married individuals, 13 widows or widowers and 4 individuals who are divorced.

As of 2000, there were 69 private households in the municipality, and an average of 2.3 persons per household. There were 24 households that consist of only one person and 3 households with five or more people. Out of a total of 70 households that answered this question, 34.3% were households made up of just one person and there was 1 adult who lived with their parents. Of the rest of the households, there are 15 married couples without children, 24 married couples with children There were 4 single parents with a child or children. There was 1 household that was made up of unrelated people and 1 household that was made up of some sort of institution or another collective housing.

In 2000 there were 72 single family homes (or 45.0% of the total) out of a total of 160 inhabited buildings. There were 73 multi-family buildings (45.6%), along with 8 multi-purpose buildings that were mostly used for housing (5.0%) and 7 other use buildings (commercial or industrial) that also had some housing (4.4%).

In 2000, a total of 69 apartments (23.5% of the total) were permanently occupied, while 191 apartments (65.2%) were seasonally occupied and 33 apartments (11.3%) were empty.

The historical population is given in the following chart:

== Sights ==
The entire villages of Biel, Ritzingen and Selkingen are designated as part of the Inventory of Swiss Heritage Sites.

== Politics ==
In the 2007 federal election the most popular party was the CVP which received 58.79% of the vote. The next three most popular parties were the SP (18.94%), the SVP (18.18%) and the FDP (3.03%). In the federal election, a total of 97 votes were cast, and the voter turnout was 54.8%.

In the 2009 Conseil d'État/Staatsrat election a total of 90 votes were cast, of which 9 or about 10.0% were invalid. The voter participation was 53.6%, which is similar to the cantonal average of 54.67%. In the 2007 Swiss Council of States election a total of 97 votes were cast, of which 2 or about 2.1% were invalid. The voter participation was 54.8%, which is much less than the cantonal average of 59.88%.

== Economy ==
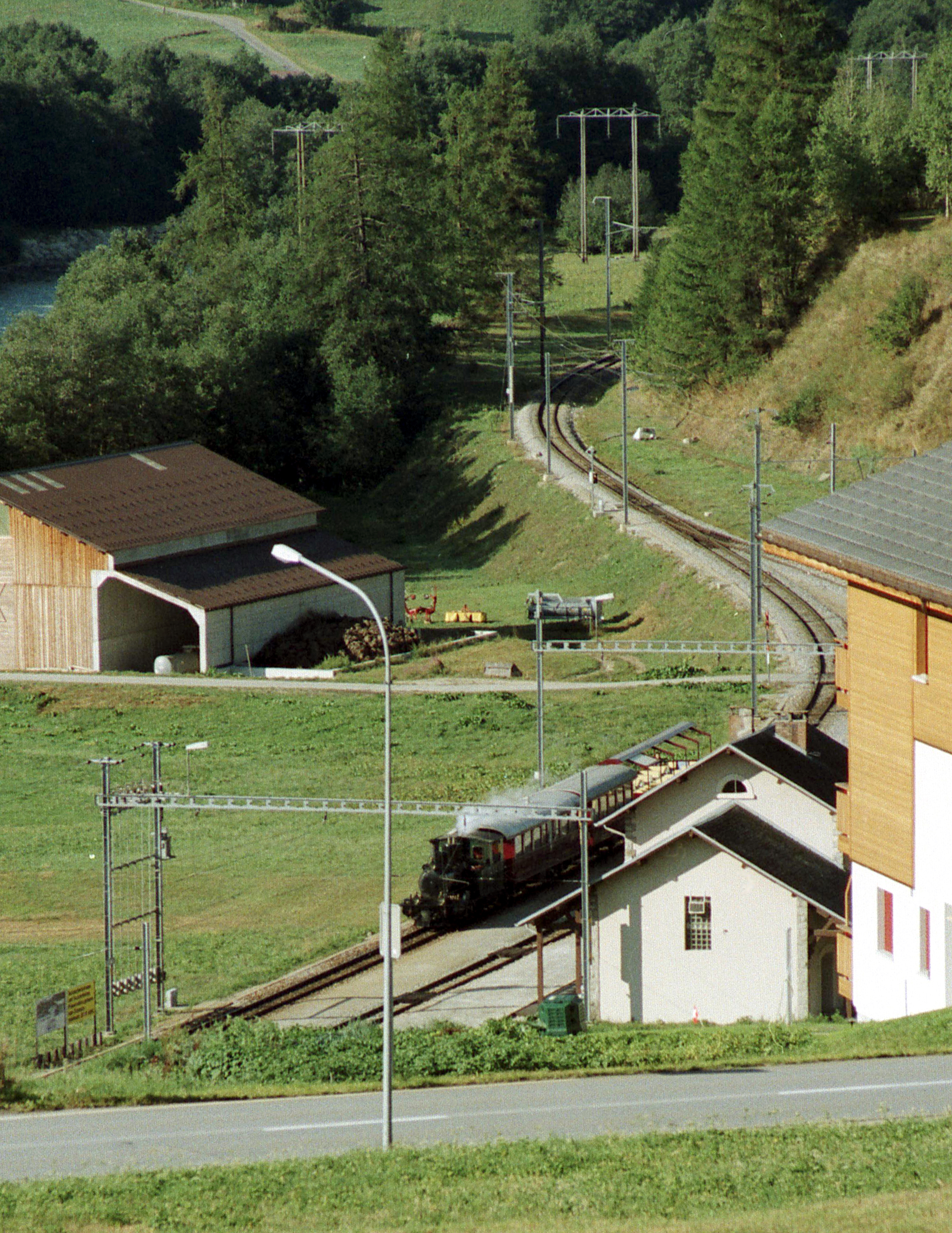
Steam train in the Biel train station

As of 2010, Grafschaft had an unemployment rate of 1.3%. As of 2008, there were 19 people employed in the primary economic sector and about 8 businesses involved in this sector. 3 people were employed in the secondary sector and there were 2 businesses in this sector. 32 people were employed in the tertiary sector, with 9 businesses in this sector. There were 90 residents of the municipality who were employed in some capacity, of which females made up 44.4% of the workforce.

In 2008 the total number of full-time equivalent jobs was 40. The number of jobs in the primary sector was 16, of which 10 were in agriculture and 6 were in forestry or lumber production. The number of jobs in the secondary sector was 3 of which 2 or (66.7%) were in manufacturing and 1 was in construction. The number of jobs in the tertiary sector was 21. In the tertiary sector; 2 or 9.5% were in wholesale or retail sales or the repair of motor vehicles, 2 or 9.5% were in the movement and storage of goods, 12 or 57.1% were in a hotel or restaurant, 1 was the insurance or financial industry, 1 was a technical professional or scientist, .

In 2000, there were 31 workers who commuted into the municipality and 50 workers who commuted away. The municipality is a net exporter of workers, with about 1.6 workers leaving the municipality for every one entering. Of the working population, 16.7% used public transportation to get to work, and 51.1% used a private car.

== Religion ==
From the 2000 census, 178 or 92.7% were Roman Catholic, while 10 or 5.2% belonged to the Swiss Reformed Church. Of the rest of the population, there were 2 members of an Orthodox church (or about 1.04% of the population).

== Education ==
In Grafschaft about 77 or (40.1%) of the population have completed non-mandatory upper secondary education, and 8 or (4.2%) have completed additional higher education (either university or a Fachhochschule). Of the 8 who completed tertiary schooling, 87.5% were Swiss men, 0.0% were Swiss women.

As of 2000, there were 13 students in Grafschaft who came from another municipality, while 20 residents attended schools outside the municipality.
