= Bellwald =

- Municipality
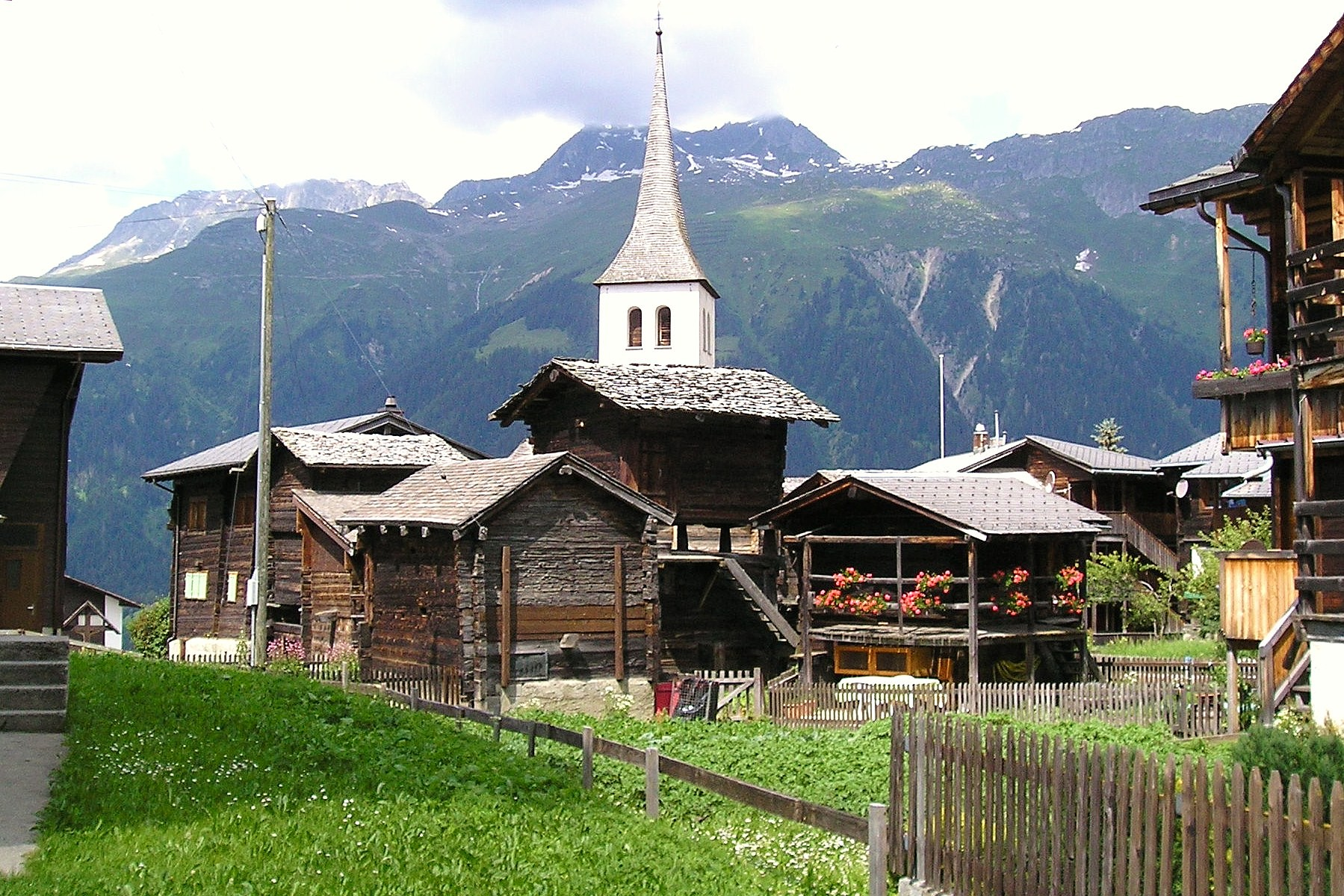

- Flag Coat of arms
- Location of Bellwald
- Location within Switzerland Location within Canton of Valais
- Coordinates: 46°26′N 8°9′E
- Country: Switzerland
- Canton: Valais
- District: Goms

Government
  - Mayor: Martin Bittel

Area
  - Total: 13.7 km^{2} (5.3 sq mi)
- Elevation: 1,560 m (5,120 ft)

Population (December 2002)
  - Total: 452
  - Density: 33.0/km^{2} (85.5/sq mi)
- Time zone: UTC+01:00 (CET)
  - Summer (DST): UTC+02:00 (CEST)
- Postal code: 3997
- SFOS number: 6052
- ISO 3166 code: CH-VS
- Surrounded by: Blitzingen, Ernen, Fiesch, Fieschertal, Grafschaft, Niederwald
- Website: www.bellwald.ch

Bellwald is a municipality in the district of Goms in the canton of Valais in Switzerland.

== History ==
Historic aerial photograph by Werner Friedli from 1955

Bellwald was first used to refer to the nearby mountain 1273 Beliwalt and 1293 Belwalt. The name then came to mean the main village below the mountain. The village was first mentioned in 1374 as Zblattun.

== Geography ==
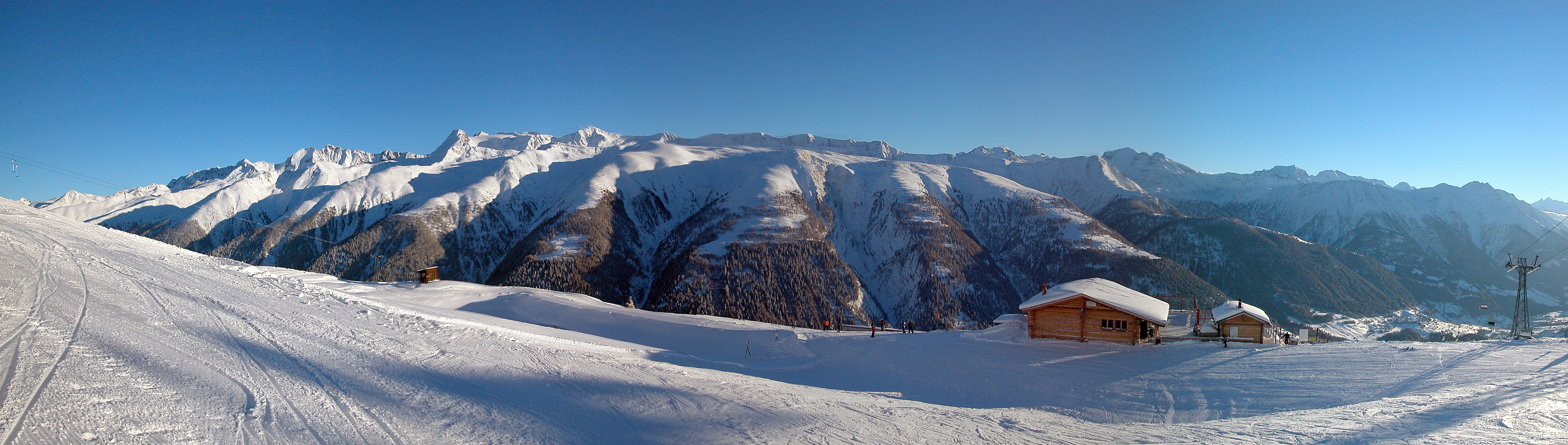
Above Bellwald, view over the valley

Bellwald has an area, as of 2011, of 13.7 square kilometers (5.3 mi^{2}). Of this area, 49.7% is used for agricultural purposes, while 19.8% is forested. Of the rest of the land, 4.4% is settled (buildings or roads) and 26.2% is unproductive land.

It lies at 1,600 m (5,200 ft) and is the highest village in Goms, or the upper Rhône river valley.

The municipality consists of scattered settlements between the Rhône and Fiescher valley. It consists of the village of Bellwald and the hamlets of Ried, Eggen, Bodmen and Fürgangen.

== Coat of arms ==
The blazon of the municipal coat of arms is Azure, issuant from Coupeaux Vert a Pine tree of the same trunked Maroon.

== Demographics ==
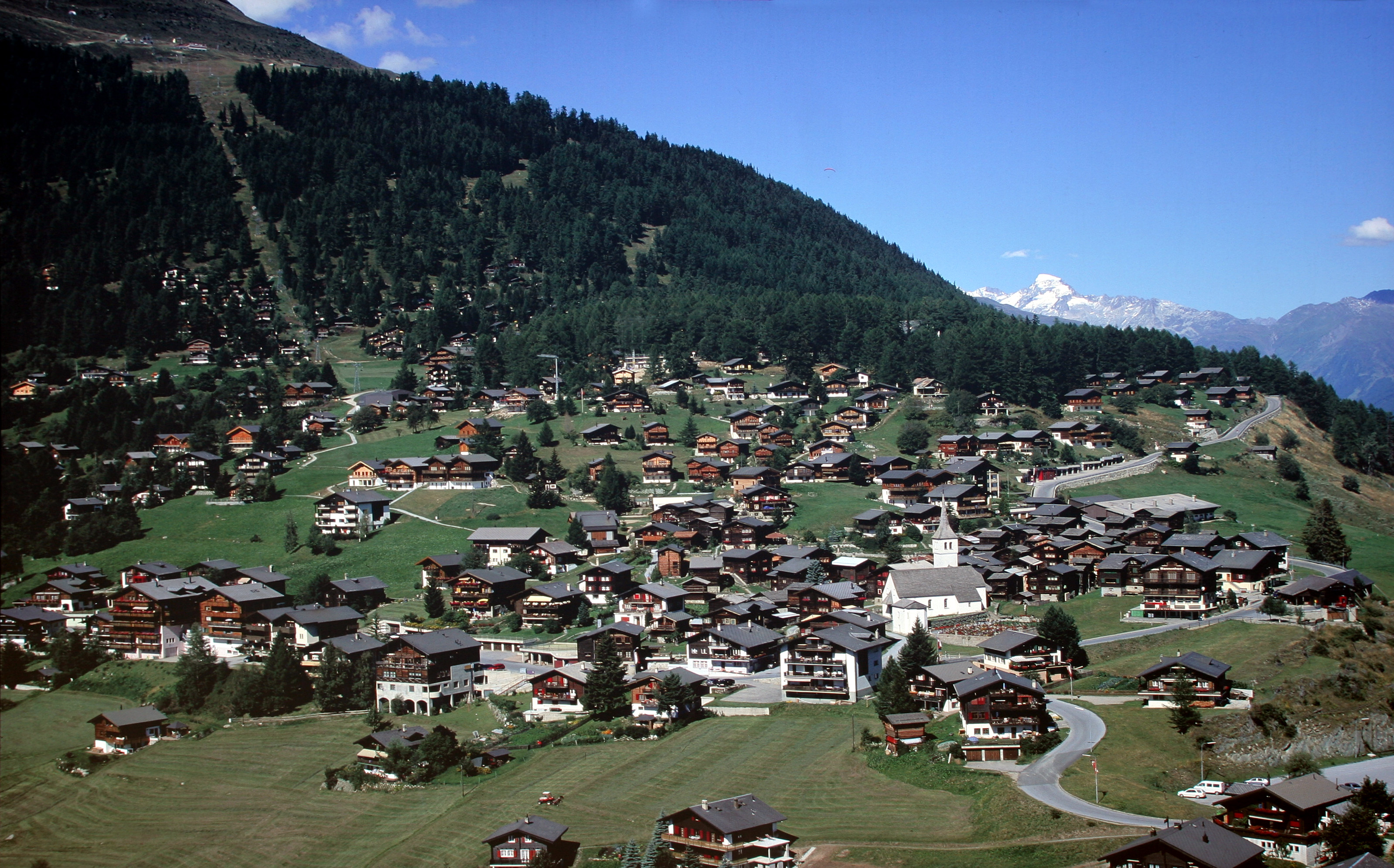
Bellwald village

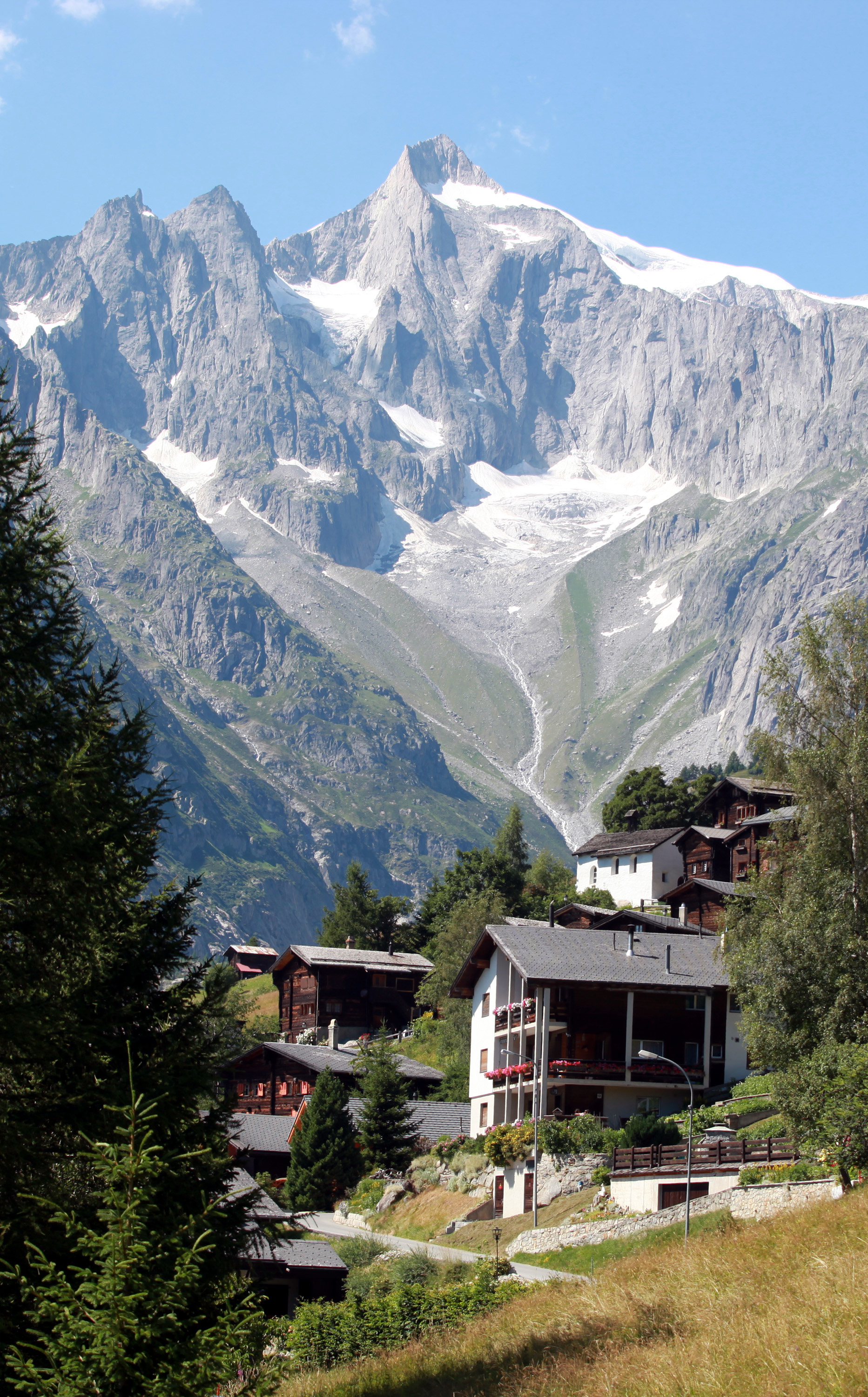
Ried village in Bellwald

Bellwald has a population (as of December 2020) of 354. As of 2008, 15.2% of the population are resident foreign nationals. Over the last 10 years (1999–2009 ) the population has changed at a rate of -6.5%. It has changed at a rate of -3.3% due to migration and at a rate of 2.4% due to births and deaths.

Most of the population (as of 2000) speaks German (375 or 87.8%) as their first language, Serbo-Croatian is the second most common (16 or 3.7%) and Albanian is the third (12 or 2.8%). There are 3 people who speak French, 1 person who speaks Italian.

As of 2008, the gender distribution of the population was 51.5% male and 48.5% female. The population was made up of 199 Swiss men (43.4% of the population) and 37 (8.1%) non-Swiss men. There were 189 Swiss women (41.3%) and 33 (7.2%) non-Swiss women. Of the population in the municipality 217 or about 50.8% were born in Bellwald and lived there in 2000. There were 69 or 16.2% who were born in the same canton, while 59 or 13.8% were born somewhere else in Switzerland, and 71 or 16.6% were born outside of Switzerland.

The age distribution of the population (as of 2000) is children and teenagers (0–19 years old) make up 25.8% of the population, while adults (20–64 years old) make up 57.6% and seniors (over 64 years old) make up 16.6%.

As of 2000, there were 166 people who were single and never married in the municipality. There were 233 married individuals, 26 widows or widowers and 2 individuals who are divorced.

As of 2000, there were 175 private households in the municipality, and an average of 2.4 persons per household. There were 56 households that consist of only one person and 12 households with five or more people. Out of a total of 179 households that answered this question, 31.3% were households made up of just one person and there were 4 adults who lived with their parents. Of the rest of the households, there are 49 married couples without children, 62 married couples with children There were 2 single parents with a child or children. There were 2 households that were made up of unrelated people and 4 households that were made up of some sort of institution or another collective housing.

In 2000 there were 433 single family homes (or 75.2% of the total) out of a total of 576 inhabited buildings. There were 96 multi-family buildings (16.7%), along with 17 multi-purpose buildings that were mostly used for housing (3.0%) and 30 other use buildings (commercial or industrial) that also had some housing (5.2%).

In 2000, a total of 158 apartments (20.0% of the total) were permanently occupied, while 570 apartments (72.2%) were seasonally occupied and 62 apartments (7.8%) were empty. As of 2009, the construction rate of new housing units was 34.9 new units per 1000 residents. The vacancy rate for the municipality, in 2010, was 2.52%.

The historical population is given in the following chart:

== Sights ==
The entire hamlet of Bodma is designated as part of the Inventory of Swiss Heritage Sites.

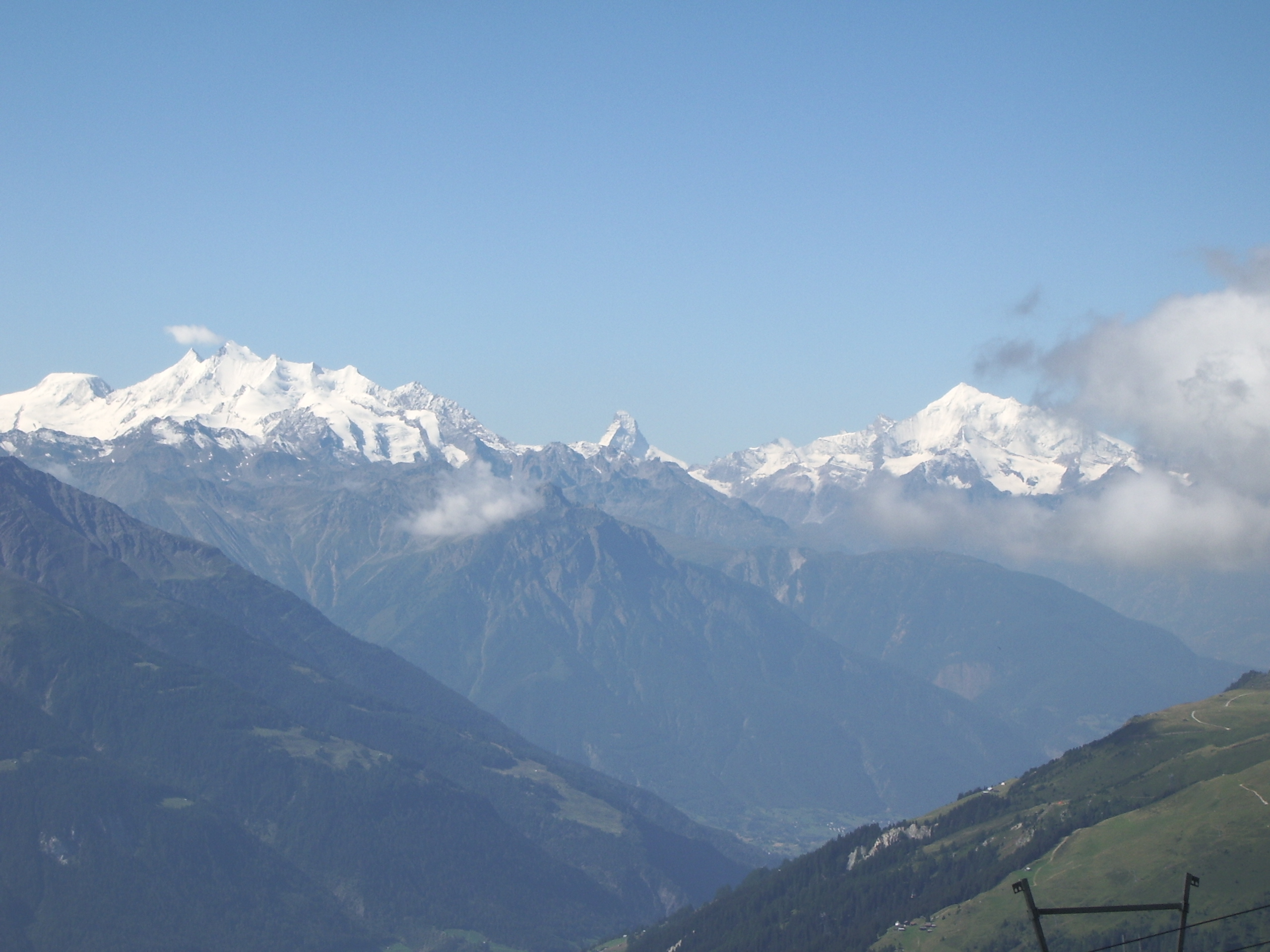

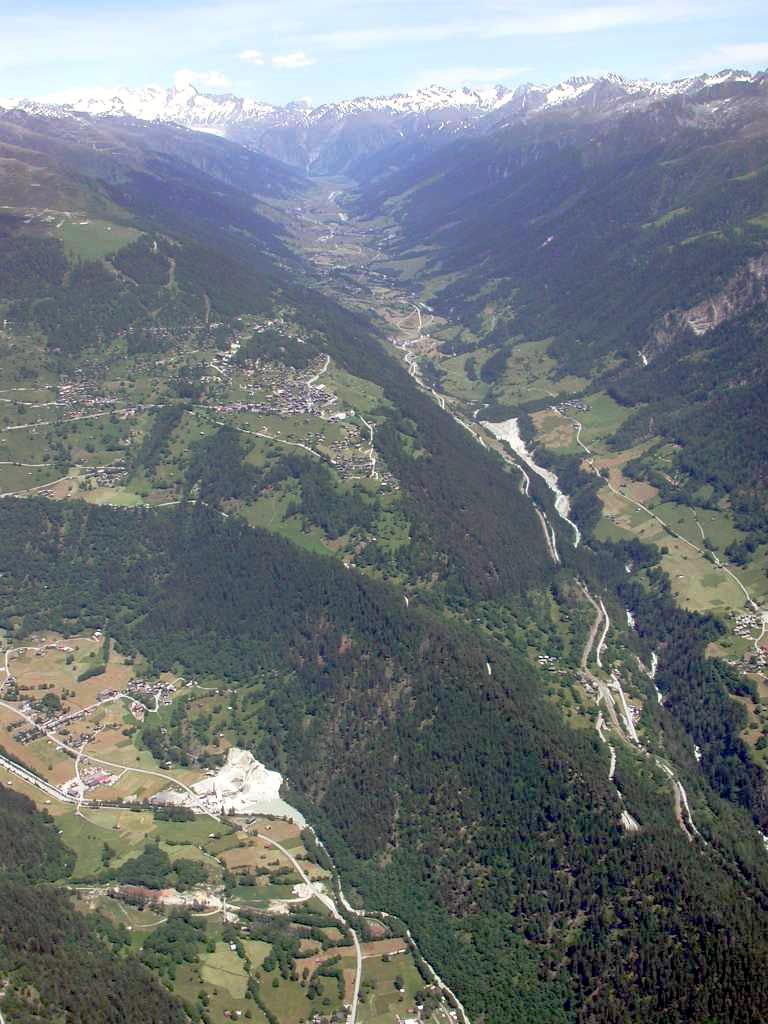

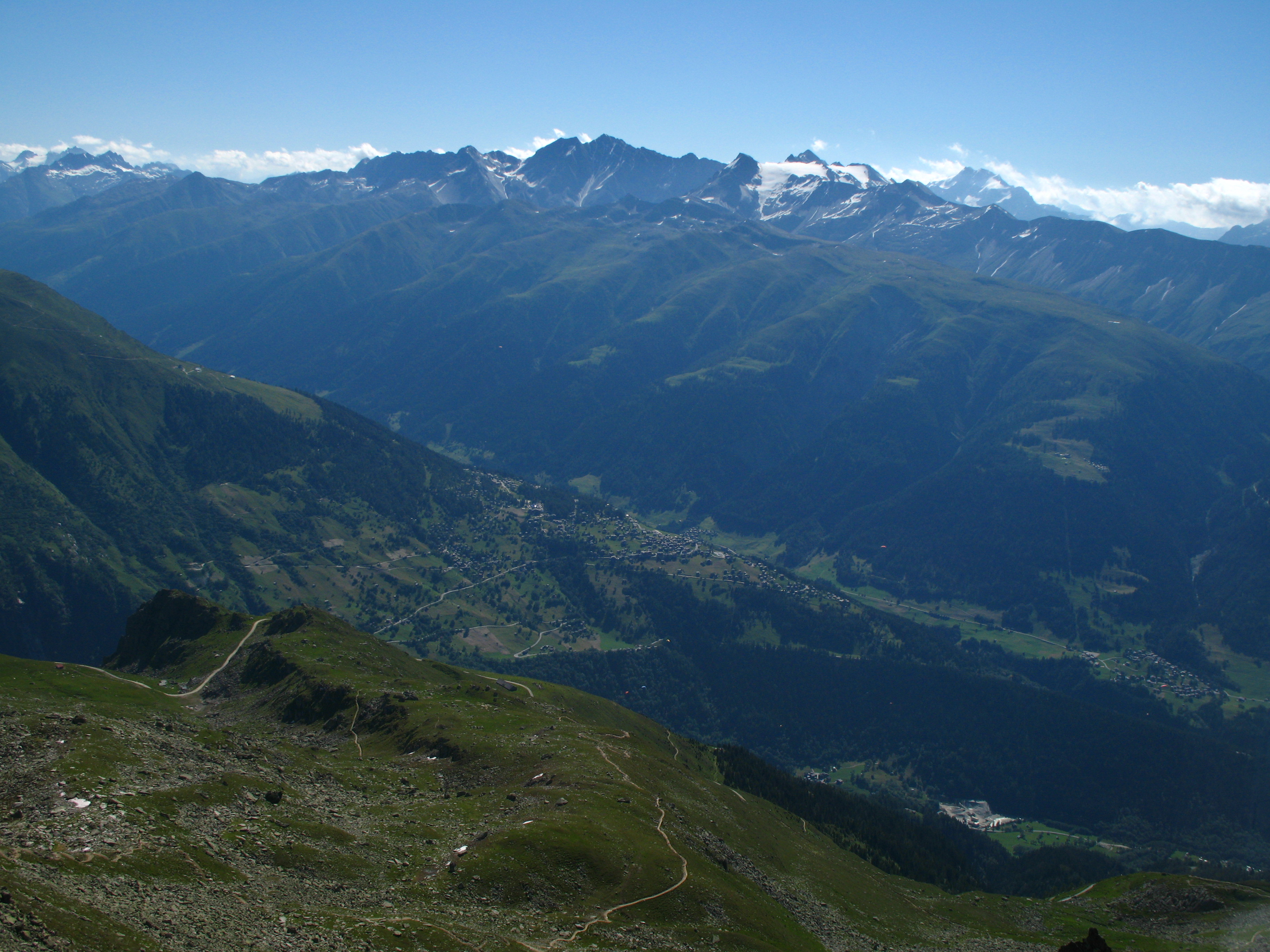

== Politics ==
In the 2007 federal election the most popular party was the CVP which received 56.51% of the vote. The next three most popular parties were the SVP (18.89%), the SP (17.91%) and the FDP (4.28%). In the federal election, a total of 167 votes were cast, and the voter turnout was 54.4%.

In the 2009 Conseil d'État/Staatsrat election a total of 154 votes were cast, of which 16 or about 10.4% were invalid. The voter participation was 53.1%, which is similar to the cantonal average of 54.67%. In the 2007 Swiss Council of States election a total of 165 votes were cast, of which 5 or about 3.0% were invalid. The voter participation was 55.0%, which is similar to the cantonal average of 59.88%.

== Economy ==
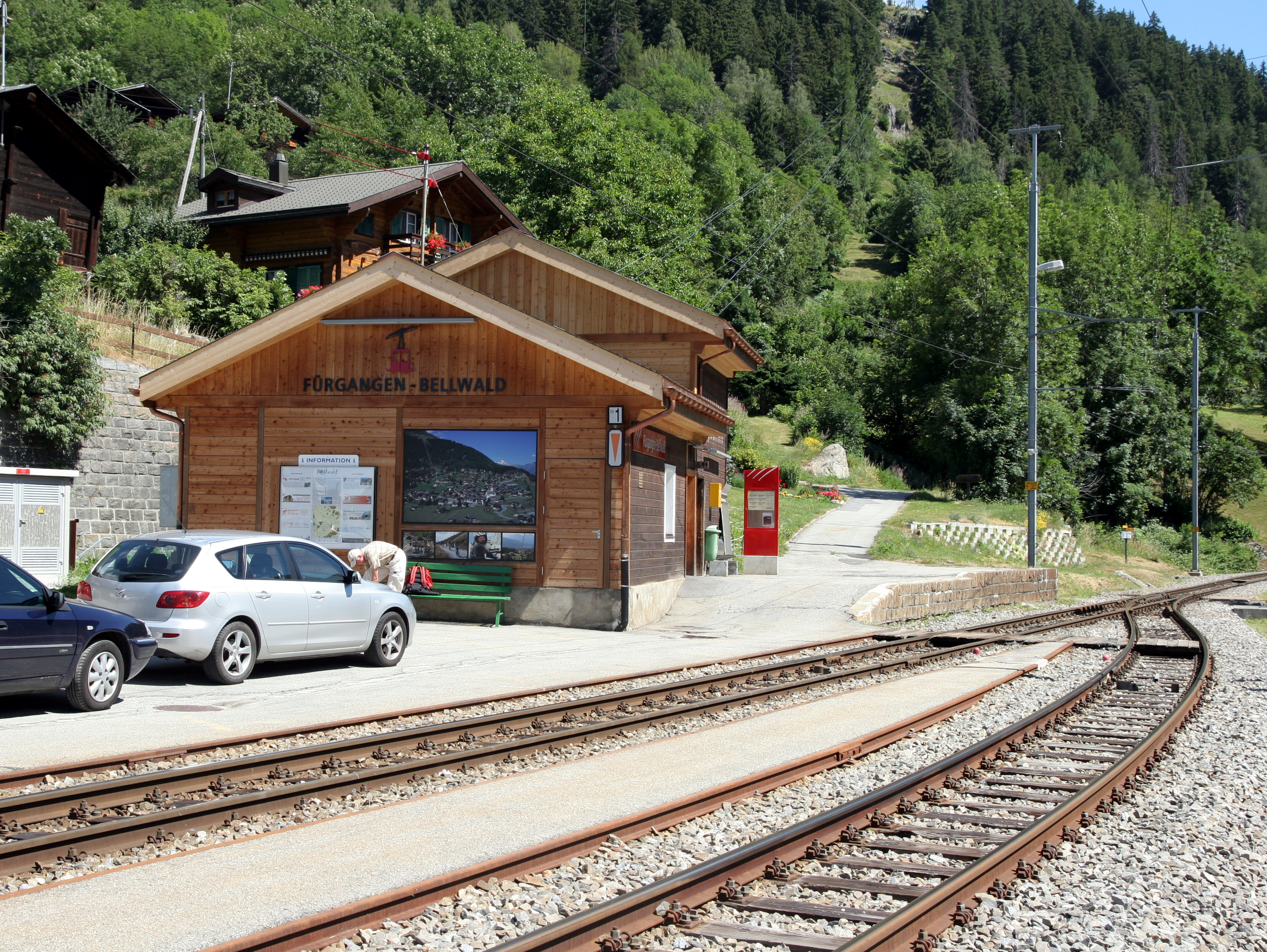
Fürgangen-Bellwald train station

As of 2010, Bellwald had an unemployment rate of 3.8%. As of 2008, there were 19 people employed in the primary economic sector and about 8 businesses involved in this sector. 48 people were employed in the secondary sector and there were 7 businesses in this sector. 118 people were employed in the tertiary sector, with 25 businesses in this sector. There were 204 residents of the municipality who were employed in some capacity, of which females made up 42.6% of the workforce.

In 2008 the total number of full-time equivalent jobs was 158. The number of jobs in the primary sector was 10, all of which were in agriculture. The number of jobs in the secondary sector was 47 of which 12 or (25.5%) were in manufacturing and 35 (74.5%) were in construction. The number of jobs in the tertiary sector was 101. In the tertiary sector; 19 or 18.8% were in wholesale or retail sales or the repair of motor vehicles, 16 or 15.8% were in the movement and storage of goods, 49 or 48.5% were in a hotel or restaurant, 1 was the insurance or financial industry, 1 was a technical professional or scientist, 3 or 3.0% were in education.

In 2000, there were 43 workers who commuted into the municipality and 51 workers who commuted away. The municipality is a net exporter of workers, with about 1.2 workers leaving the municipality for every one entering. Of the working population, 11.8% used public transportation to get to work, and 36.3% used a private car.

== Religion ==
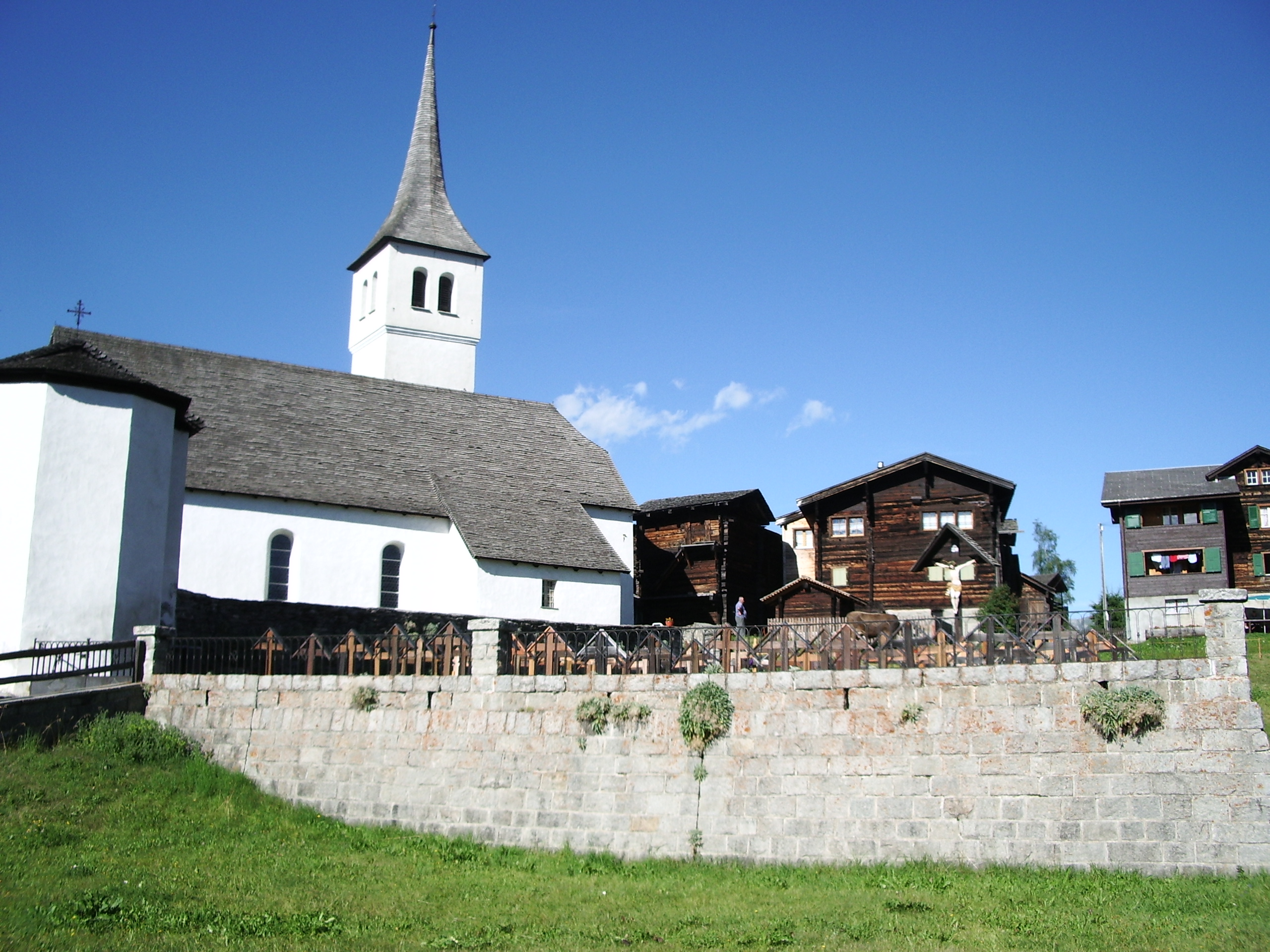
Bellwald church

From the 2000 census, 332 or 77.8% were Roman Catholic, while 28 or 6.6% belonged to the Swiss Reformed Church. Of the rest of the population, there were 8 members of an Orthodox church (or about 1.87% of the population), and there was 1 individual who belongs to another Christian church. There were 27 (or about 6.32% of the population) who were Islamic. 20 (or about 4.68% of the population) belonged to no church, are agnostic or atheist, and 11 individuals (or about 2.58% of the population) did not answer the question.

== Education ==
In Bellwald about 154 or (36.1%) of the population have completed non-mandatory upper secondary education, and 39 or (9.1%) have completed additional higher education (either university or a Fachhochschule). Of the 39 who completed tertiary schooling, 46.2% were Swiss men, 15.4% were Swiss women, 23.1% were non-Swiss men and 15.4% were non-Swiss women.

During the 2010-2011 school year there were a total of 21 students in the Bellwald school system. The education system in the Canton of Valais allows young children to attend one year of non-obligatory Kindergarten. During that school year, there was one kindergarten class (KG1 or KG2) and 4 kindergarten students. The canton's school system requires students to attend six years of primary school. In Bellwald there were a total of 2 classes and 21 students in the primary school. The secondary school program consists of three lower, obligatory years of schooling (orientation classes), followed by three to five years of optional, advanced schools. All the lower secondary students from Bellwald attend their school in a neighboring municipality. All the upper secondary students attended school in another municipality.

As of 2000, there were 32 students in Bellwald who came from another municipality, while 10 residents attended schools outside the municipality.
