= Payan =

Payan or Payán is a surname. Notable people with the surname include:

- Ana Rosa Payán, Mexican right-wing politician, Director of the National System for Integral Family Development
- Benoît Payan (born 1978), French politician and mayor of Marseille
- Claude-François de Payan (1766–1794), political figure of the French Revolution
- Eliseo Payán (1825–1895), Colombian lawyer, politician, and military officer
- Eugene Payan (1888–1971), Canadian ice hockey player
- Ferdinand Payan (1870–1961), French bicyclist who competed in the first Tour de France
- Ilka Tanya Payán (1943–1996), Dominican-born actress and attorney, later an HIV/AIDS activist in the United States
- Joseph-François de Payan (1759–1852), political figure during the French Revolution, brother of Claude-François de Payan

== See also ==
- Paya (disambiguation)
- Payani
- Payn
- Payyans
