= Charles Ritz =

French hotelier and fly fisher (1891–1976)

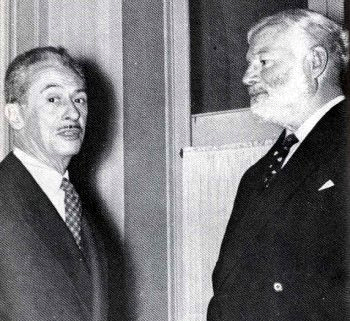
- Charles Ritz (left) with Ernest Hemingway on receiving a prize from the Fario Club
- Born: Karl Cäsar Alexander Ritz; 1 August 1891; Wolxheim, France
- Died: 11 July 1976 (aged 84); Île de France, Paris, France
- Occupation: Hotelier
- Spouse: Monique Ritz (born: Ramseier)

Charles C. Ritz (born Karl Cäsar Alexander Ritz; August 1, 1891 – July 11, 1976) was a French hotelier and fly fishing specialist. Like his father César Ritz, he was the owner and manager of Hôtel Ritz Paris.

== Biography ==
Charles Ritz was the first of two sons born to Swiss hotelier César Ritz (born 1850) and Marie-Louise Beck (born 1867), whose family also owned and ran a hotel in Menton. He did not know his itinerant father well, and César died in 1918 when Charles was 27 years old.

Charles Ritz emigrated to the United States in 1916 where he became a soldier in the US Army. When World War I ended, Ritz returned to the US, and soon spent considerable time mastering the art of fly-fishing in the American West. He married Elisabeth Pierce.

Ritz returned to France in the 1930s. His experience with fly fishing made him one of the foremost specialists on the subject. Ernest Hemingway called him, "One of the finest fly fisherman I know". Ritz wrote a book, A Fly Fisher's Life, which has been read by anglers around the world. It has been regarded as one of the landmarks of fly fishing literature. He invented the parabolic fly-rod, a term coined by Everett Garrison, a famous bamboo fly rod maker. Fly rods of this type were commercially produced by Paul H. Young, Abu Garcia, Pezon et Michel, and Jim Payne among others. He was a publicist for the high speed - high line style of fly casting (HSHL). He founded the "Fario Club", which was the most select fishing club in the world during the later part of the twentieth century.

Charles Ritz spent several years assisting his mother managing the Ritz Hotel, and assumed presidency of the empire in 1953, when his mother Marie-Louise retired. Marie-Louise returned to her husband's village in Switzerland, Niederwald, during the summer and set up the Ritz Foundation specifically for Niederwald's youth. The foundation pays for scholarships and apprenticeship programs. Marie-Louis died in 1961. He attempted to introduce his progressive ideas when he opened le bar Vendôme and the l'Espadon restaurant but found himself hampered by the board of directors.

Ritz remarried in 1971 and retired from the hotel presidency in 1976, three months before his death.

He is buried in Père Lachaise Cemetery alongside his first wife.
