= E.W. Edwards =

Fly rod maker

Eustis William Edwards (July 27, 1857 – December 31, 1931) was best known as a premier bamboo fly rod maker and innovator. During his time, the fly rods he made were considered the best of their kind. He worked for H.L. Leonard, co-created the Kosmic Rod, produced fly rods under his own name and manufactured them for the large sporting goods companies. His contributions were crucial in the creation of what today we regard as the 'modern fly rod'.

== Early life and Leonard ==
Eustis Edwards was born July 27, 1857, in the U.S. state of Maine. He was the son of William Scott Edwards a civil engineer and mother, Susan Jane Parsons.

As a young adult, he tried his hand at a few different occupations before joining the Leonard Rod Company in 1882 as one of Leonard's first apprentices. He left Maine to follow Leonard to Central Valley, New York as an apprentice rod builder. Other great rod makers worked there as well: F.E. Thomas, E.F. Payne, Fred Devine, George Varney, Hiram Hawes and Loman Hawes—with whom Leonard developed his revolutionary beveling machine.

== E.W. Edwards Rodmaker ==
=== Kosmic and beyond ===
In 1889 Edwards, along with F.E. Thomas and Loman Hawes left the Leonard shop to start a new rodmaking partnership. With Edwards' bamboo processing skills, Hawes' mechanical ingenuity, and Thomas' management experience, the firm quickly established themselves under the name 'Kosmic' for A.G. Spalding (sports equipment) & Bros. They built some of the most desirable rods and began setting standards for the 'modern fly rod'.

Shortly after the partnership was formed, Loman Hawes left and was replaced by E.F. Payne.

The 'Kosmic' fly rod enjoyed many awards and accolades in its short time. Edwards and Hawes received patents for ferrule designs in 1890. 'Kosmic' rods were displayed at the 1893 World's Columbian Exposition in Chicago and won a gold medal. In 1894 in a climate of a growing economic depression, Spalding sold its interest in the 'Kosmic' partnership to U.S. Net & Twine. 'Kosmic' Rods have become legendary despite their brief time of production.

After the sale of the Kosmic partnership to USN&T, the original founders broke up. Thomas returned to Maine, as did Payne to Connecticut, both to venture into independent rodmaking. Edwards left to explore Los Angeles and may have had relatives in that area—some think he apprenticed briefly with a professional photographer in either Chicago or L.A.--and returned to the New York and New England area after about a year.

=== Experiments and innovation ===
At the age of 58, after a fifteen-year hiatus from rod building, E.W. Edwards began to production again. He experimented with the Arundinaria Amabilis material in secrecy. When he began manufacturing rods again, they contained some revolutionary technical advantages. He developed a way to temper Tonkin Cane to increase its resiliency, quickening its recovery time (damping) and lessened its weight, with open flame. The newly tempered bamboo allowed Edwards to shorten the length of the rod. It achieved the desired performance without the full working length of rod then standard in fly fishing. His seven and a half foot and shorter lengths became a sensation. These were some of the innovations that made Edwards' rods seminal in the creation of the 'modern dry fly rod'.

Between 1914 and 1919, E.W. Edwards made rods in Brewer, Maine, with his sons Bill and Gene. These rods took on some of the distinctive hallmarks of the E.W. Edwards Rod, such as the "autograph" in white script on the bamboo near the grip. They made rods bearing the name, Abercrombie & Fitch, the sporting goods house. In 1919 Winchester Repeating Arms Company purchased the E.W. Edwards Rod Company.

=== Winchester ===
Edwards was retained to oversee the operations in New Haven, Connecticut. While there, Edwards largely produced two lines of bamboo rods—one that was lower quality and that he is generally believed only to have supervised at best, and another more exclusive line that was handmade by Edwards. The latter were extremely high quality rods, and included a few seven-foot examples. After his five-year contract expired, Edwards left Winchester in 1924, though he continued to build rods at his home. Winchester continued to make all of the Edwards-designed rods until 1930.

=== Mt. Carmel ===
Edwards moved to 40 Filbert St in Hamden while still at Winchester, purchasing the house in 1922. He lived there the rest of his life. His last wife, Bertha, continued to live at 40 Filbert St after his death, as did his son Bill. He worked out of the Filbert St house until early 1927, when he moved his business to a large building in Mt. Carmel, a nearby town. Edwards produced four ranges of models. He had six employees, including his sons Bill and Gene. Master Rodmaker, Clarence "Sam" Carlson also worked there as a boy. In 1927, the name of the company changed to E.W. Edwards & Sons. The company made rods for various suppliers: Abbey & Imbrie, Weber, Paul H. Young as well as others. In 1931, E.W. Edwards & Sons sold to Horton Manufacturing.

== Personal life ==
Eustis Edwards was born in 1857 in Maine U.S.A.. His grandfather was the editor and part-owner of the Portland Advertiser newspaper in Maine, his great-grandfather was an Advocate General in the Continental Army.

Throughout his life, Edwards tried various occupations. As a young adult, he started a small business selling fruit and confections, he was a bookkeeper and laborer before becoming an apprentice rodmaker. He practiced professional photography.

In 1886, Eustis married Jennie Gordon. They gave birth to son, William in 1887. In 1895, Edwards and family left for Los Angeles; an ill-fated journey as Jennie became sick and died en route. Eustis moved back to New York and worked as a photographer. The next year, he moved to Brewer, Maine and began making fly rods in partnership with F.E. Thomas, before returning to photography again while continuing to work part-time for Thomas. In roughly 1915 Edwards began to make and sell rods under his own name.

Edwards remarried in 1900 to Bertha Ford. In 1902, their son Gene was born.

After becoming ill in 1931, Edwards made arrangements to sell his fly rod company. The deal became difficult due to the Great Depression. Eustis Edwards died at Mt. Carmel, Connecticut, on New Year's Eve of that year. He is buried in Highland Mills, New York at Cemetery of the Highlands, the same resting place as Jim Payne and H.L. Leonard.
