= Joseph François =

Joseph François may refer to:

- Joseph François (Haiti politician), Haitian minister of Justice
- Joseph François (Seychelles politician), member of the National Assembly of Seychelles
- Joseph Pascal François (1853–1914), Governor of French India
- Joseph Francois (economist), professor of international economics

== See also ==
- Joseph-François
- François-Joseph
