= François-Joseph =

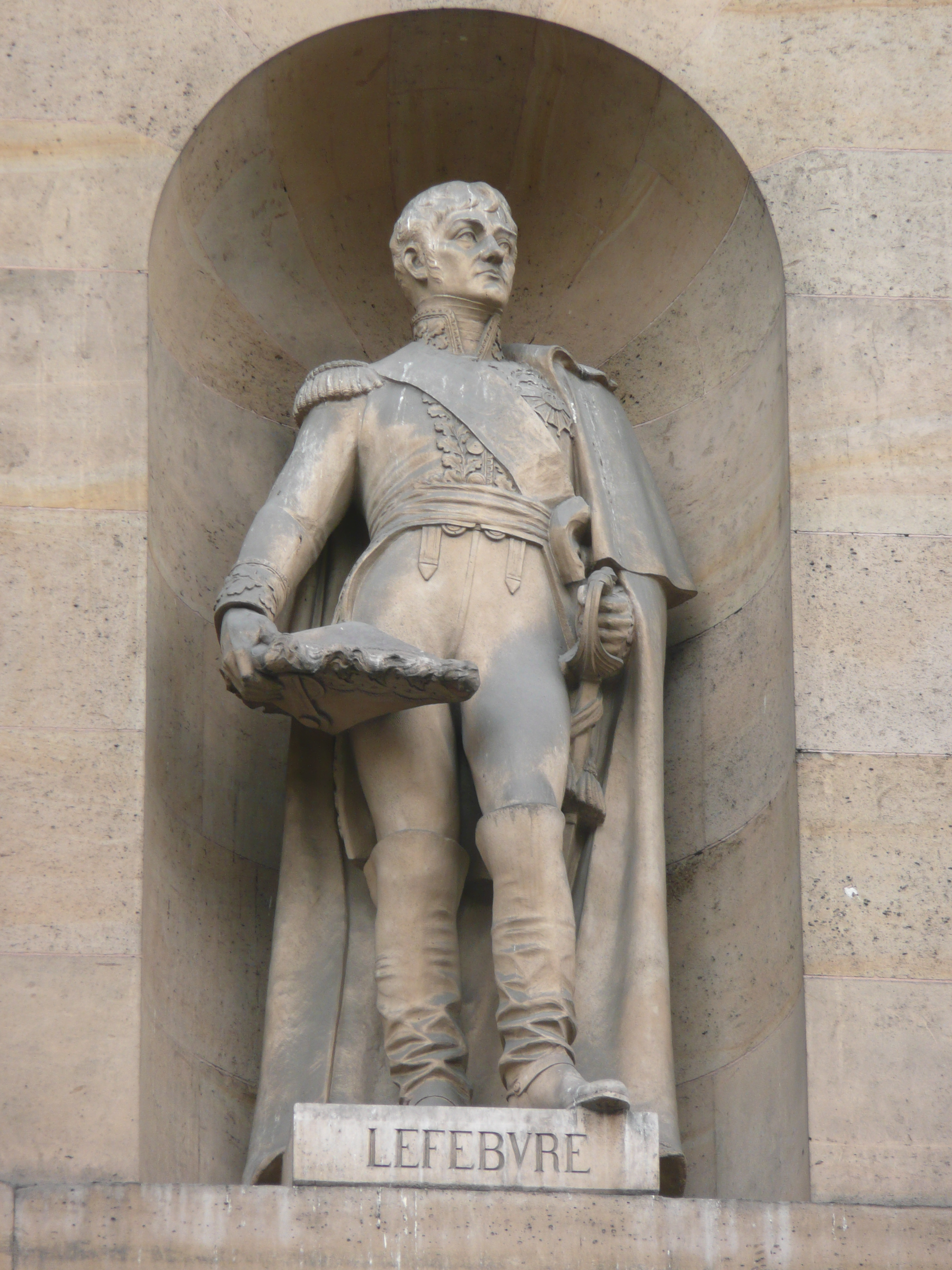
- François-Joseph Lefebvre
- Language: French

Other gender
- Feminine: Françoise-Josephine

Other names
- Short form: Franjo
- Anglicisation: Francis Joseph
- Related names: François, Joseph

François-Joseph is a masculine double name, composed of the French names François and Joseph. François-Joseph is a calque of the classic German double name Franz-Josef or Franz-Joseph. François-Joseph is the equivalent form of the English double name Francis Joseph.

The name François-Joseph enjoys great popularity in the French language, with the form Francisque-Joseph sporadically appearing as well. Notable bearers of the name François-Joseph include the French composer François-Joseph Gossec, the painter François-Joseph Navez, and François Joseph Lefebvre. Additionally, there are aristocrats such as François-Joseph de Riquet.

== Personalities ==
- François-Joseph Amon d'Aby (1913–2007), Ivoirian playwright and essayist
- François-Joseph de Beaupoil de Sainte-Aulaire (1643–1742), French poet and army officer
- François-Joseph Bélanger (1744–1818), French architect and decorator
- François-Joseph Bérardier de Bataut (1720–1794), French teacher, writer and translator
- François-Joseph Bissot (1673–1737), Canadian merchant, navigator and a co-seigneur of Mingan; son of François Byssot de la Rivière
- François-Joseph Bressani (1612–1672), Jesuit priest
- Général François-Joseph Chaussegros de Léry (1754–1824), Canadian Engineer-in-Chief and Commander-in-Chief of Napoleon's Armies Armies in Holland
- François-Joseph d'Offenstein (1760–1837), French general and military commander
- François-Joseph de Champagny (1804–1882), French author and historian
- François-Joseph Duret (1732–1816), French sculptor
- François-Joseph Fétis (1784–1871), Belgian musicologist, composer, critic and teacher
- François-Joseph Hunauld (1701–1742), French anatomist
- François-Joseph Laflèche (1879–1945), Canadian politician
- François-Joseph Navez (1787–1869), Belgian neo-classical painter
- François-Joseph Talma (1763–1826), French actor
- Nzanga Mobutu (François-Joseph Mobutu Nzanga Ngbangawe) (born 1970), politician in the Democratic Republic of the Congo

== See also ==
- François-Joseph-Philippe
- François-Joseph-Victor
- François-Xavier-Joseph
- Joseph François
- Joseph-François
