= Joseph-François =

Joseph-François is a given name, and may refer to:

- Joseph-François Armand (1820–1903), Canadian politician
- Joseph-François de Payan (1759–1852), French political figure
- Joseph-François Deblois (1797–1860), Canadian lawyer, judge and political figure
- Joseph-François Duché de Vancy (1668–1704), French Playwright
- Joseph-François Garnier (1755–1825), French oboist and composer
- Joseph-François Kremer (born 1954), French composer, conductor and musicologist
- Joseph-François Lafitau (1681–1746), French Jesuit missionary and writer
- Joseph-François Lambert (1824–1873), French adventurer, businessman, and diplomat
- Joseph-François Malgaigne (1806–1865), French surgeon and surgical historian
- Joseph-François Mangin, French-American architect
- Joseph-François Perrault (1753–1844), Canadian businessman and political figure
- Joseph-François Poeymirau (1869–1924), French general

== See also ==
- François-Joseph
- Joseph François
- Joseph-François-Louis-Charles
