= Michel Roth =

French chef

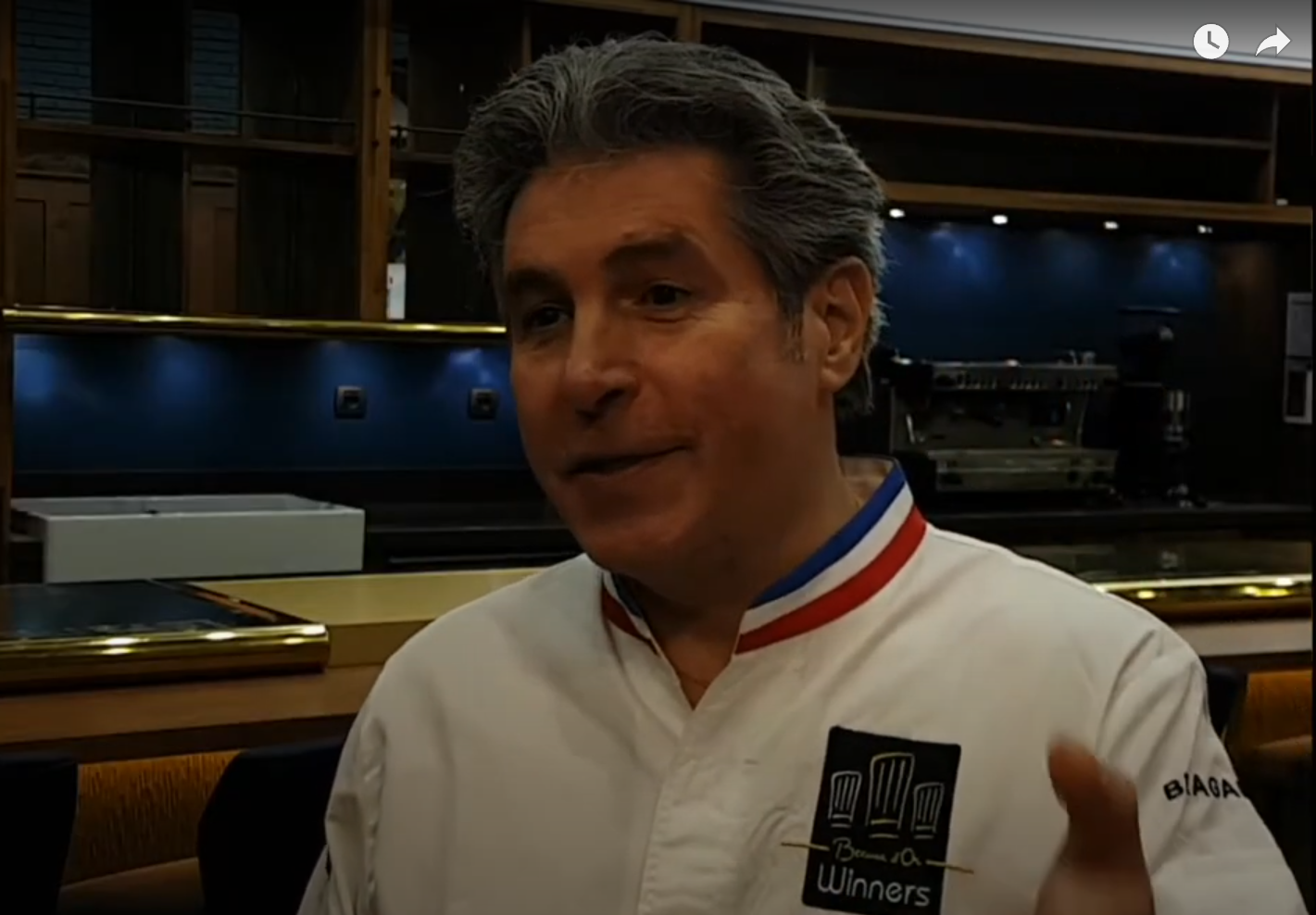
- Roth in 2017
- Born: 7 November 1959 (age 66); Sarreguemines, Moselle, France
- Culinary career
- Rating(s): Michelin stars Gault et Millau (17/20)
- Current restaurant: Hôtel Ritz Paris
- Previous restaurants: L'Espadon; Lasserre
- Television show: MasterChef France
- Website: www.restaurantbayview.com

Michel Roth (born 7 November 1959) is a French chef who has been awarded two stars by the Michelin Guide. He has also received other famous titles, such as the Bocuse d'Or and Meilleur Ouvrier de France, both in 1991.

== Training and career ==
Michel Roth began his training course at the Auberge de la Charrue d'Or in Sarreguemines, following at the Auberge de L'Ill in Illhaeusern and at Le Crocodile in Strasbourg, and at the restaurant Ledoyen in Paris. In 1981, he was hired as a chef assistant at the Hôtel Ritz Paris located at place Vendôme.

In 1992, he became the chef of the restaurant L'Espadon. He left L'Espadon on 10 June 1999 for the restaurant Lasserre. In 2001, the Hôtel Ritz contacted him again to become the head chef and he accepted the opportunity. In 2009, he and the restaurant L'Espadon received a second Michelin star. He was the executive chef of the restaurant until it closed on 1 August 2012 for a complete renovation. During that period, he created his food consulting company and became in September 2012, the executive chef and culinary advisor of Hotel President Wilson in Geneva. In November 2013, he received a Michelin star for the restaurant Bayview and the grade of 17/20 at the Gault et Millau.

== Television appearances ==
Michel Roth appeared for the first time in the television documentary Le Festin de Noël, broadcast on France 3 on 8 December 2010.

He appeared in 2011 as a guest in the second season of the French version of Masterchef, broadcast on TF1, where he asked the contestants to dress 3 dishes in 30 minutes. The dishes were part of the daily cuisine of the Ritz-Espadon, composed of an entry with crab, a dish with lobster, and a dessert with pear.

In December 2013 he co-hosted the program Repas de fête broadcast on Arte with Caroline Mignot.

== Honors ==
- 1997: Medallist of the city of Paris
- 2000: Officier du Mérite Agricole
- 2003: Chevalier of the National Order of Merit
- 2006: Chevalier of the Legion of Honour

== See also ==
- List of Michelin starred restaurants
