= Paul H. Young =

American fly fisherman

Paul Holden Young (b. Arkansas, 1890 – d. Michigan, April 28, 1960) was a master bamboo fly rod maker, fly tyer and fly fishing innovator. The work of Paul Young is greatly admired by anglers and collectors today.

== Early life ==
Paul Young was born in Cherry Valley, Arkansas. He fished as a child in the Mississippi River and the Ozarks. He was a hunter and taxidermist and graduated from the University of Arkansas, Fayetteville in 1912. He traveled throughout the U.S. and Canada fishing and hunting. Shortly after marrying Martha Marie in 1921, he moved to Detroit, Michigan, and three years later, opened a fishing tackle store there. It became a popular destination for serious fly fisherman of the mid-west.

== Fly Rod Developments ==
Paul Young was one of the most experimental craftsmen in rodmaking. He was a restless artisan who pushed the boundaries of fly rod design, although he made a relatively limited number for his time.

=== Restless Artisan ===
It has been said that Young was not as interested in the aesthetics of a fly rod as much as he was in lightweight and functionality. One example was the deliberate use of two differently-tapered tip sections to give the angler two different casting actions in one outfit. He used a specially shaped grip with an impression for the caster's thumb. This idea had been used many years earlier by Granger. His use of a "ventilated grip" (already used by Wes Jordan for his South Bend fly rods, which left spaces between the cork rings for a skeletal appearance), aluminum for his reel seats and ferrules. His desire to shed as much weight as possible from a fly rod created an aesthetic all its own.

The Paul H. Young Company outsourced fishing rod construction to companies: Heddon, South Bend Bait Company and E.W. Edwards.

=== Ring of Fire ===
Young developed a ringed gas jet to heat temper the bamboo for his rods. This "ring of fire" gave his rods a greater power to weight ratio and the rich, flamed appearance that was signature to his designs. Due to his proximity to Detroit USA, Paul Young was surrounded by some of the world's best engineers and machinists. As a result, Paul acquired and adapted a horizontal Milling Machine he used to perfect his taper designs, through his friend and then Chrysler Corporation President, K. T. Keller. Following his service in WWII as a Marine, Jack Young continued his father's knack of adapting machinery for bamboo rod making use. As an example, he incorporated a military surplus 16 cylinder hydraulic pump, designed to operate the belly or "ball" turret, for the twin 50 Caliber guns of a B-29 Super Fortress, to construct a bamboo laminating binder. The Paul Young and company also purchased a large quantity of surplus B-29 electrical conduit, for use in making their rod tubes. The company was assisted in fabricating their devices, by a family friend and highly skilled local machinist, August Pernack. He also helped develop the 'step down' or Welsh style ferrule-making operation. This was prior to adopting the Super Z ferrules, or the optional aluminum "Featherweight" ferrules, which were offered for lighter duty rods.

=== The 'Para' Paradigm ===
Young's signature tapers (measured diameter of a rod, determining its performance characteristics) were known as parabolic, a term coined by Everett Garrison, a rodmaker who used the term to describe a prototype fly rod made by Charles Ritz and were more radical than other contemporary designs of its type. Paul Young was most famous for his 'Midge', a four weight rod measuring six feet, three inches. Originally intended for the challenging, light-tackle needs of sophisticated chalk-stream fly fisherman, the 'Midge' rod was put to uses its creator never intended, such as landing Atlantic Salmon.

Arnold Gingrich said in his The Joys of Trout: "He was venerated in the last decade of his life as "the Stradivari of the Midge rod", and died enjoying near-legendary status as a cult figure."

Paul Young died in 1960, his legacy was carried on by his son, John O. (Jack) Young, whom beginning in 1962, taught every aspect of the craft to his protégé, R.W. Summers, whom "Jack" hired as an outboard motor "mechanics assistant", at 16 years old, in 1956.
