= Ritz Sidecar =

Cocktail

The Ritz Sidecar is a cocktail known as one of the most expensive drinks in the world and is a variant of the more common Sidecar. The drink was invented by Colin Peter Field and is served at the Bar Hemingway at the Hôtel Ritz Paris. The cognac used is made of pre-phylloxera grapes.

As of 2017, the price is €1,500.

== Ingredients ==
The Ritz Sidecar cocktail contains the following ingredients:

- 5/10 Ritz Fine Champagne 1865 Cognac
- 3/10 Cointreau
- 2/10 lemon juice
