= Colin Peter Field =

English bartender and author

- Born: 17 May 1961 (age 65); Rugby, West Midlands, England
- Occupations: Bartender, author
- Known for: Forbes and Travel + Leisure magazines, the world's best bartender. Head bartender at the Hemingway Bar of the Hôtel Ritz Paris.

Colin Peter Field (born 17 May 1961 at Rugby, West Midlands, England) is a bartender and author who has been ranked as best bartender in the world by Forbes and Travel + Leisure magazines. He is the head bartender at the Hemingway Bar of the Hôtel Ritz Paris, voted Best of the Best Bar in the World by Virtuoso in Las Vegas in 2016, and has invented several drinks, such as the Picasso Martini, Highland Cream, Serendipity and Clean Dirty Martini. He is involved in the training of students for bartending in France and in Switzerland, and has authored the books The Cocktails of the Ritz Paris and Cocktails, A Simple Story.

== Career ==
Forbes and Travel + Leisure magazines have stated that Field is the world's best bartender. Forbes stated Field was the world's best bartender in 1997, 2001, and 2004. Field has presided over the Hemingway Bar at Hôtel Ritz Paris as head bartender. since its opening in 1994, though the hotel closed for refurbishment in 2012 and opened in 2016.

Field earned the silver medal for the Scott Cup for French Bartenders in 1982 before going on to take the silver medal for the world title (Martini Grand Prix for Bartenders in the same year.

He was the first bartender to be published in the French version of Who's Who, which occurred in 2011. Field has offered cocktail courses to the public at the Hôtel Ritz Paris, in which participants receive a signed certificate from Field upon completion of the course, and is involved in the training of students for bartending and degree courses in the Cesar Ritz school in Montreux, Switzerland.

In 2011 Field created the world's first degree for Bartenders in France. The M.O.F.(Meilleure Ouvrier de France). This is a B.A.C +2 level 3 from the Sorbonne University. Field was recruited by the French restaurant La Mer, located in Honolulu, Hawaii, as a consultant in the redesign of its L'Aperitif bar and drink menu. The bar's cocktail list was developed by Field. Field also reworked the drink list for the restaurant's Lewers Lounge. He has also provided consulting for hotels, such as the Carlyle Hotel and The Mark Hotel in New York. He has worked on short missions or events in The Ritz Hotel, The Connaught Hotel, The Beaumont Hotel and Browns in London, The Taj Mumbai, The Pierre, and the Surrey Hotel in New York, The President Hotel and The Imperial Hotel in Tokyo, The Vittoria Excelsior in Sorrento, Il Pellicano Hotel in Porto Ercole, Tuscany and Cipriani Hotel in Venise also The Orient Express V.S.O.E. During the Ritz Closure between 2012 and 2016, Field was a consultant, event organiser and worked with Air France aboard the A380 and Boeing 777 making cocktails in the air in First Class and Business Class to New York, Houston, Miami, Hong Kong, Shanghai, Japan, Mexico City and Rio de Janeiro.

== Mixologist ==
Field has invented drinks such as the Picasso Martini, which involves the use of an ice cube made with frozen dry vermouth and distilled water. Another Field drink invention is the Highland Cream cocktail, which he created in 1982. The Serendipity, which includes champagne, apple juice and mint, among other items, is another one of his inventions. The World's first Clean Dirty Martini was invented in the Hemingway Bar in 2016.

Guinness World Records listed Field as preparing the "first most expensive cocktail in the world, titled the Ritz Sidecar, which originally was sold for 400 euros initiating a race around the world to create more and more expensive cocktails. The Ritz Side Car was priced at €1,500 in 2016 rates, this is approximately US$1,796 in 2016. The current world record is held by Joel Heffernan's drink, the Winston, which was served on 7 February 2013 at Club 23, Melbourne, Australia. His cocktail in 2013 was US$12,916.

Field was also the impetus for the now global bartender tweezers, originally using surgeons' tweezers in 1994. Field was rather embarrassed at the time but carried on using them in cocktail contests and behind the Hemingway bar, going on to patent a style of cocktail tweezers in France.

== Awards ==
In 1983 at the Martini World Championships, Field won a silver medal for France and the Silver Medal for The Scott Cup France.

== Book ==
The Cocktails of the Ritz Paris is an illustrated book that covers various cocktails, their preparation and their history. Kate Moss, a personal friend of Field's, wrote the preface to Field's book. Moss is a regular customer at the Hemingway bar.

== Publications ==
- The Cocktails of the Ritz Paris. Simon and Schuster. 2003. ISBN 0743247523.
- The Ritz Paris: Mixing Drinks, A Simple Story. Editions de La Martiniere, 2010. ISBN 978-2732443607

== See also ==
- List of bartenders
