= Lasserre (restaurant) =

Restaurant in Paris, France

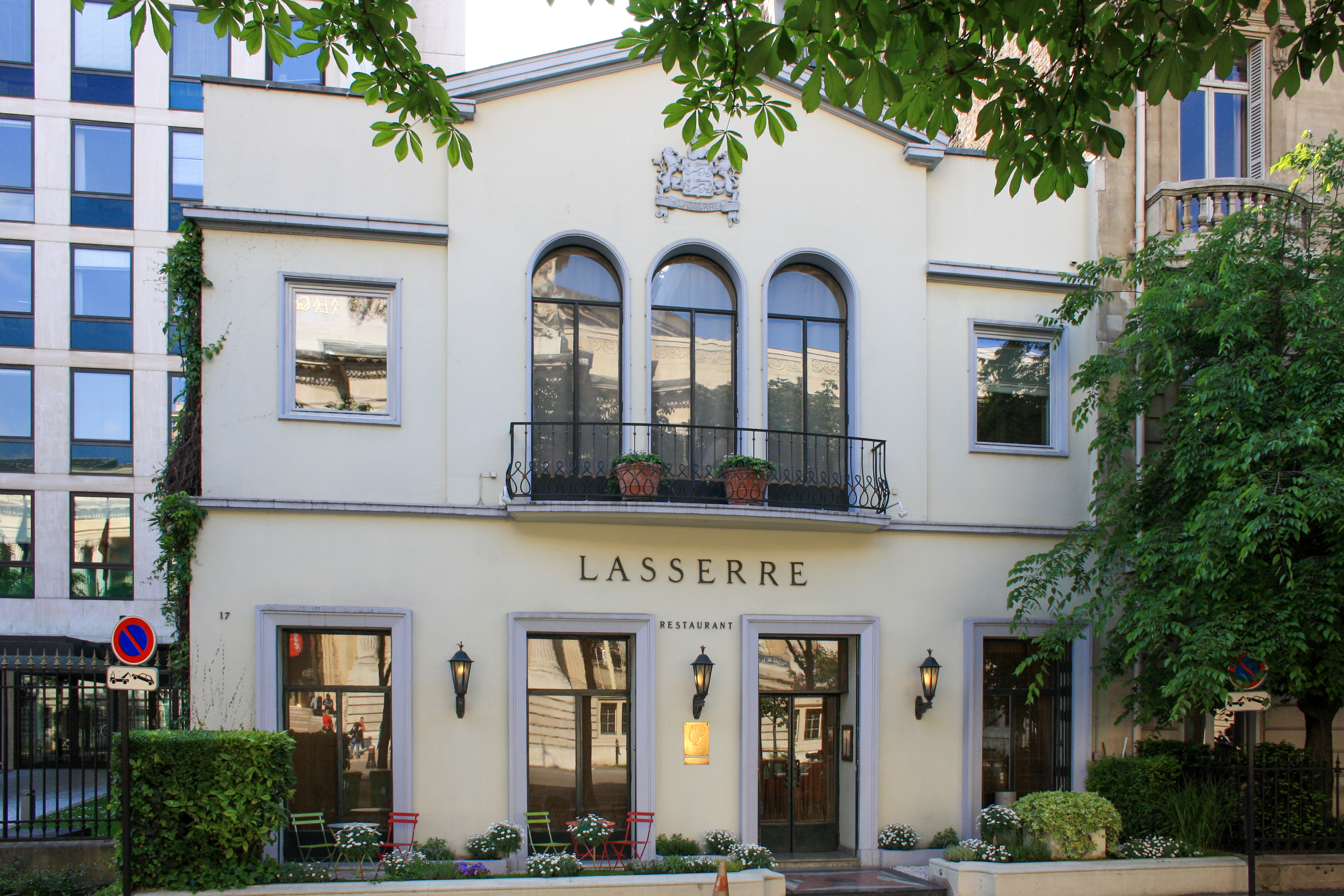
- The front façade of the restaurant

- Location within Paris

Restaurant information
- Established: 1942
- Chef: Nicolas Le Tirrand
- Pastry chef: Jean Lachenal
- Food type: French cuisine
- Location: 17, avenue Franklin-D.-Roosevelt, Paris, France
- Coordinates: 48.8663235°N 2.3099213°E
- Website: www.restaurant-lasserre.com

Lasserre (French pronunciation: [lasɛʁ]) is a restaurant located in the Champs-Élysées quarter in the 8th arrondissement of Paris, France.

== History ==
The restaurant was founded by René Lasserre in 1942. It received its first Michelin Guide star in 1949, then a second star in 1951. In 1962, it was awarded a third star that then lost in 1983.

André Malraux, Marc Chagall, Salvador Dalí, Romy Schneider, Audrey Hepburn, Jean-Claude Brialy and Frédéric Dard were patrons of Lasserre. During a lunch at Lasserre's, Chagall decided to paint the ceiling of the Opéra Garnier.

René Lasserre created renowned dishes like the orange-flavoured duck of Challans, the André-Malraux pigeon, truffle and foie gras macaroni, and the Élysées-Lasserre timbale. Between 2001 and 2010, Lasserre's cuisine was led by Jean-Louis Nomicos, the former chef of La Grande Cascade trained by Alain Ducasse. Nomicos was replaced by Christophe Moret from the Plaza Athénée in 2010, then by Michel Roth in 2016. Since September 2018, Nicolas Le Tirrand has been the chef of Lasserre, accompanied by the pastry chef Jean Lachenal.

The restaurant is known for its transparent roof. The inner room was completely refurbished in 2017.

Since 2015, the restaurant has one Michelin star.

== Bibliography ==
- Glyn, Anthony (2000). The Companion Guide to Paris. Woodbridge: Companion Guides. ISBN 978-1-900639-20-0.
- Huyghe, René (1988). Les Champs-Élysées et leur quartier (in French). Paris, La Délégation, diffusion Hachette. pp. 92–94. ISBN 978-2-905118-20-2.
- Laforgue, Adeline (1992). Cinquantenaire Lasserre, 1942-1992 (in French). GEP.
- Nomicos, Jean-Louis; Ribaut, Jean-Claude; Ducasse, Alain (foreword); Buhagiar, Olivier (photography) (2007). Lasserre (in French). Favre.
- Streiff, Gérard (2008). Adam Saulnier, journaliste d'art à l'ORTF (in French). Bry-sur-Marne: INA. ISBN 978-2-296-05048-8.
- Todd, Olivier (2001). André Malraux. Une vie (in French). Paris: Gallimard. ISBN 978-2-07-074921-8.
