= Carole Rousseau =

French television presenter (born 1967)

- Born: 25 December 1967 (age 57); La Garenne-Colombes, Hauts-de-Seine, France
- Occupation: television presenter
- Years active: 1989–present
- Notable credit(s): Appels d'urgence (TF1); 90' Enquêtes (TMC); MasterChef France (TF1); Le Grand Concours (TF1)
- Television: TF1, TMC, C8

Carole Rousseau (born 25 December 1967) is a French television presenter.

== Life and career ==
Carole Rousseau was born in La Garenne-Colombes in the department of Hauts-de-Seine. After studying law and obtaining a DESS (Diplôme d'études supérieures spécialisées) in audiovisual communication law, she started in 1991 working on FR3 with Jean-Marie Cavada for the program La Marche du Siècle. After being a production assistant for Le Droit de savoir with Charles Villeneuve from 1993 to 1996, she joined France 2 from September 1996 to June 1997 to present the program Déjà dimanche with Jean-Luc Delarue.

In 1997, she joined TF1 to co-host the program Plein les yeux with Jacques Legros (primetime compiling shocking images) and then to co-host Célébrités with Stéphane Bern. From 1997 to 1999, Carole Rousseau also presented several special programs such as Tirage de la Coupe du Monde at the Stade Vélodrome of Marseille, and Le Millénium on 31 December 1999 with Jean-Claude Narcy.

At the second part of the evening, after Célébrités, she rose to fame in the 2000s with two magazines, Scrupules and C'est quoi l'amour ?. In Scrupules, produced by Jean-Luc Delarue, anonymous guests had to justify behaviors and ways of living judged immoral in front of a public they had to deal with. But the program was not broadcast anymore after 6 episodes due to lack of audience.

In addition to magazines, Carole Rousseau also hosts game shows and contests on primetime such as Le Grand Concours, Le Grand Quiz du cerveau, and even Le Bac blanc with Christophe Dechavanne.

Since May 2006, she co-hosted again with Jacques Legros on TF1 the programs Les 30 histoires les plus mystérieuses / spectaculaires / extraordinaires until 2012.

She also presents on channel TMC the program 90' enquêtes, mostly about delinquency including reports with the police, and 90' Faits Divers. She produced the magazine Ma drôle de vie presented by Alexia Laroche-Joubert. Since September 2009, she presents the magazine Au cœur du crime about news items, on TF1

In August 2010, she presented the first season of the French version of MasterChef, a national cooking contest broadcast on TF1. She then presented the three following seasons until December 2013.

== Personal life ==
Carole Rousseau married Silvio Rossi Arnaud, a lawyer, on October 1, 2011. She gave birth to twin boys named Luchino and Vittorio on July 19, 2013.
