= Paya =

Paya may refer to:

== Places ==
- Paya, Boyacá, a municipality in the department of Boyacá, Colombia
- Paya, Dominican Republic, a municipal district of the Baní municipality
- Paya, India, a town in Arunachal Pradesh state of India
- Paya Jaras, a state constituency in Malaysia
- Paya, Kyain Seikgyi, a village in Kayin State, Myanmar
- Paya, Darién, Panama

== Other ==
- Paya, Inc., a payments processing company
- Paya (food), a spicy meat stew native to Pakistan and North India
- Paya language, the language spoken by the Pech
- Pech people, an indigenous tribe of Honduras previously known as the Paya
- Oswaldo Payá (1952–2012), Cuban politician
