= H.L. Leonard =

American woodworker and rodmaker

Hiram Lewis Leonard, (January 23, 1831 – January 30, 1907) was the founder of the H.L. Leonard Rod Company. He has been regarded as the father of the modern fly rod. He was also an adventurer, gunsmith, engineer and maker of musical instruments. His exploits as a guide and hunter were written about by Henry David Thoreau. As an innovator in bamboo fly rod construction, manufacture and performance, the rodmakers Leonard trained went on to become leaders in the field of bamboo rodmaking. The rods bearing his name are sought after for their aesthetics, performance and as collectables.

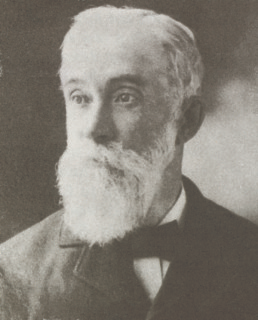
Hiram Lewis Leonard

== Early life ==
Hiram Lewis Leonard was born January 23, 1831, in Sebec, Piscataquis, Maine, to Lewis Leonard and his wife Hannah Blood. Between 1835 and 1840, the family moved to Wayne County, Pennsylvania. Before he became pioneer of the modern bamboo fly rod, Hiram Leonard was a hunter, guide, gunsmith and self-taught engineer. He also played the flute. Leonard was an outdoorsman in the still undeveloped northeast of the United States. His fearless exploits, innovative approach and wiry strength earned him a reputation as "the Great Hunter" in his own time.

Henry David Thoreau wrote that Leonard was a "handsome man of good height, but not apparently robust, of gentlemanly address and faultless toilet". Thoreau also recounted an incident where Leonard single handedly saved the lives of two passengers who were trapped in their stagecoach which had sunk in the frozen Piscataquis River.

Leonard also briefly served as the president of the Carmel Antimony Mining Company located in Carmel, Maine during the Maine Mining Boom in 1880.

== Bamboo rodmaker ==
Ernest Schweibert, in his double volume, Trout, called Hiram Leonard "the father of the modern fly rod”, not only in terms of technical knowledge but also because of the many great rodmakers who were trained in his shop.

In 1869, Leonard set up as a gunsmith in Bangor, Maine. Leonard in 1905 said, "I made my first rod in Bangor, Maine. The material used was ash and lancewood. I made it for my own use, not intending to make a business of rod manufacturing." On the advice of a friend, he sent his first rod to Bradford Anthony of Boston, Massachusetts, who "kept a sporting goods house". The salesman there understood that the craftsmanship displayed in the rod suggested an aptitude for making split-cane fishing rods. Upon examining some four-sided rods (rods that are made from four triangulated strips of bamboo that are laminated lengthwise), Leonard was asked if he could reproduce them. "Yes, and better than those.", was his reply. When Leonard commenced, he found weak spots in the raw material and decided to make the rods with six thinner strips instead. Demand for the "first ever made" hexagonal fishing rods was so great that Leonard could never fully supply enough. At this time, he opened a two-room shop on Main Street in Bangor, Maine.

He worked alone for about a year before he hired a helper. Eventually he employed eleven men, before he moved to Central Valley, New York, in 1881. In 1899 his factory was moved to the site where it remains today, though the original Leonard Rod Company was closed in 1984.

"My rods took the first prize at Vienna, London, and at the world's fair, Philadelphia, and in all contests for fly, or bait casting, they lead the world." -Hiram Lewis Leonard, 1905

== Personal life ==
On September 28, 1858, Hiram Lewis Leonard married Elizabeth S. Head in Bangor, Penobscot, Maine. They had a daughter.

== Death ==
Leonard died in Central Valley, Orange, New York, on January 30, 1907.

== Contributions to fly fishing ==
The shop under Leonard created proteges who went on to become rod making greats in their own right. Such names as Hiram Hawes, F.E. Thomas, E.W. Edwards, E.F. Payne, Fred Devine and George I. Varney all worked for Leonard. In 1875 H.L. Leonard patented the water-proof ferrule, and Leonard rods became among the first to be made on a commercial beveler. It was while working with employee Loman Hawes, that they first developed the "revolutionary" beveler. It allowed Leonard to dramatically increase production as well as increase the quality and consistency of his product. Before this time, fly rods varied greatly rod to rod. Manufacturing was difficult due to the imprecision of the tools available. With his new beveler, Leonard was able to hold tolerances to thousands of an inch. The series of measurements, known as 'tapers', he used as the templates for beveling his rods became standards for every rodmaker thereafter.
