= Bamboo fly rod =

Fly fishing rod made of split bamboo

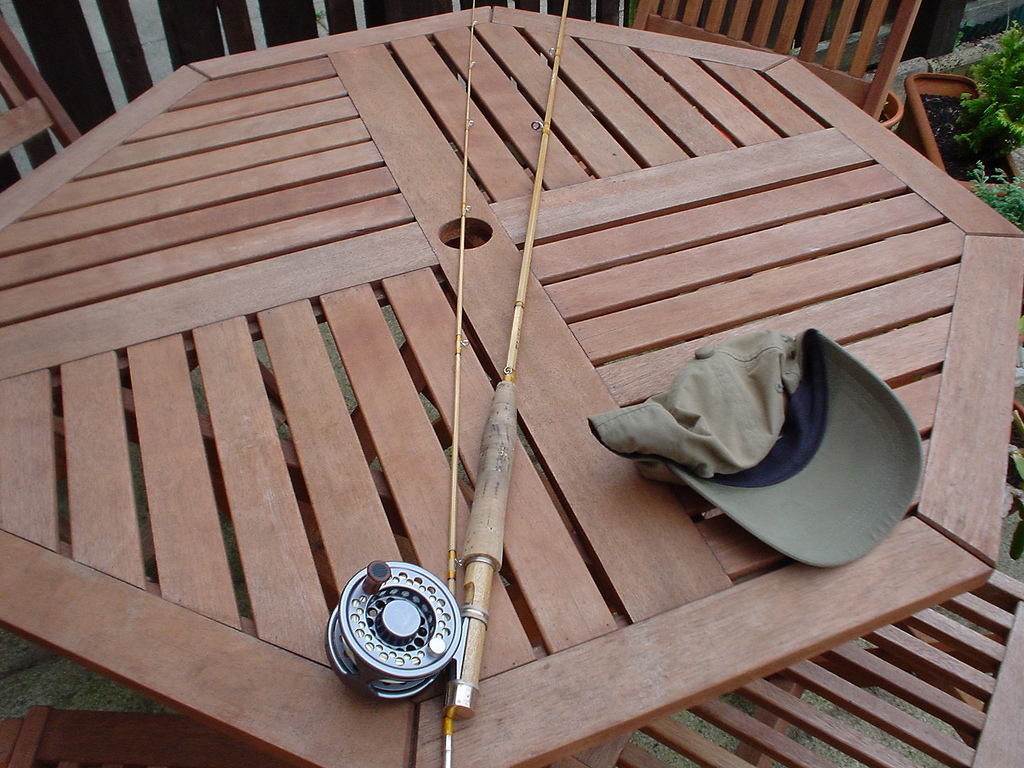

A bamboo fly rod or a split cane rod is a fly fishing rod that is made from bamboo. The British generally use the term "split cane." In the U.S., most use the term "bamboo." The "heyday" of bamboo fly rod production and use was an approximately 75-year period from the 1870s to the 1950s when fiberglass became the predominant material for fly rods. Nevertheless, bamboo fly rods made from skilled makers continue to be 'state-of-the-art' in performance and are cherished and revered by their owners.

== Manufacturing process ==
With more than 1,000 different bamboo species and nearly a hundred different kinds suitable for fishing rods, Tonkin cane (Pseudosasa amabilis) is most often used for fishing rods, replacing Calcutta cane which was used extensively prior. This bamboo species originally grew on only approximately 190 km² (48,000 acres) up the Sui River in the Tonkin Gulf region of Guangdong Province in China. It is said to be one of the strongest bamboo species because of its high density of fibers. This high density is what the bamboo fly rod maker is after because this gives the rod its strength and flexibility. It also is selected because of its straightness, and well-spaced nodes.

The bamboo culms are split and shaped into strips of equilateral triangles that taper to precise dimensions. Tolerances are held to 0.001". These precise dimensions determine the diameter of the rod when the strips are laminated into a hexagonal, square and sometimes octagonal cross-sections. Many remark that a bamboo rod resembles a pencil in shape. The diameter of the rod or blank is measured every few inches. These measurements make a 'taper', which shows how the rod goes from the fine tip to thick butt section. This is the recipe for the overall performance of the blank. This process, together with the wrapping of the guides with very fine silk thread, varnishing and making of the cork grip and wooden reel seat, can take a craftsman more than forty hours.

== History ==
Prior to the 1800s, most, if not all, flyfishermen used wooden rods. Some may have used solid bamboo rods, or "cane poles." France, England, China and the U.S. all claim to have been the birthplace of the modern "split cane" rod. In the early 1800s, quite a few people began experimenting with splitting the cane and re-gluing in 2,3 and 4 sections. Samuel Phillipe of Easton, Pennsylvania is credited (at least by Americans) as being the first to produce such a multi-sided rod. However, the use of such rods did not become commonplace until after the Civil War when makers and manufacturers sought to supply goods to the expanding nation through the use of railroads and the U.S. Mail.

Initially, the rodmakers were gunsmiths and other craftsmen like H.L Leonard, whom Americans credit with creating the first six-sided rod, the configuration that is still predominant today. Leonard began making rods in 1874, and continued to do so until his death in 1907. Square or quadrate rods were the first rods Leonard attempted to make, but he eventually started making 6 strip or hexagonal rods because of commercial reasons. At that time good quality cane was hard to find. What was available was often full of scorch marks and insect damage. For this reason it was easier to acquire six strips of good quality cane than 4 wider strips for the quadrate rod. Bill Edwards, Clarence "Sam" Carlson and Ebenezer Green produced quadrate rods and others even made bamboo rods which had pentagonal and octagonal cross-sections.

He did not make only the rods, the H.L. Leonard rod company made machinery to produce cane/ bamboo fly rods. The most important of these was the beveler. Some of the greatest fly rod makers learned their craft under Leonard and later opened their own rod shops. The company would continue to make rods for almost eight decades under various ownership, including surviving a fire in 1964 which virtually destroyed the shop. In 1984, the Leonard Rod Company closed its doors. The machinery from the shop, including the beveler, was purchased at auction by Marc Aroner who continues to make rods under his own name using the equipment.

The Leonard Rod Company found competition early in the game. In 1868, the colorful Thomas Chubb opened a rod manufacturing plant in Thetford Mass. By 1875, he would employ 50 people and market his products through the well known Chubb mail-order catalogs. The company sold not only flyrods, but all the parts necessary to build them. They manufactured and marketed their higher quality rods as "trademarked rods" bearing the Chubb star. They sold those and cheaper rods without the trademark through their catalogs, The also sold many unmarked rods to large retailers who would place the retailer's markings on the rod. This letter group of rods were known as "trade rods."

At the turn of the century, the Thomas Chubb Rod Company was bought out by a group headed by Evander Bartlett, the Montague Rod & Reel Company. This company would become the giant of the bamboo rod making industry. Initially, they continued to produce rods under both the Chubb and Montague names. The Chubbs were often brand, the Montagues were rarely marked. The vast majority were sold as trade rods in the early part of the century. Many unmarked rods of 1900 to 1930 are referred to as Chubb/Momtys today, though other manufacturers like Horrocks Ibbotson and Union Hardware also produced many thousands of unmarked trade rods. The Depression created a need for economic efficiency that saw the closing of the Chubb plant, and consolidation at Montague's main plant in Pelham Mass. The Chubb name disappeared.

Although Montague would continue to be the leader in the production of trade rods, Montague began to market their rods with their own decals as the 1920s ended. They made over 50 different models that ranged in price from $3.00 to $35.00 in the 1930s. The Montague Red Wing is the most commonly seen example of the high quality rods seen today. The Rapidan is the most common midlevel, and the Subeam the most common lower level rods seen today.

Leonard and Montague stand as examples of two different levels of bamboo fly rods: the craftsman vs. the large manufacturer. Other well known craftsman type makers were Paul Young, The Edwards Family, F.E, Thomas, LL Dickerson, H.W. Hawes and Bill Phillipson. High quality smaller manufacturers include Winston and Orvis - which still make high quality bamboo rods to this day. Larger manufacturers included high quality Heddon, and South Bend and bargain basement Horrocks Ibbotsons and Union Hardware.

Bamboo soon became the preferred material for all fishing rods with Tonkin cane being prized above other species. This continued to 1950 when a trade embargo was imposed on Chinese goods. Due to the resultant shortage of quality bamboo and the concurrent development of synthetic fibers the fabrication of bamboo rods nearly stopped. By the time the embargo ended in the early seventies only a handful of craftsmen were still making bamboo rods. The main reason for bamboo rods regaining their popularity was a result of Everett Garrison together with Hoagy Bix Carmichael publishing bamboo rod building ‘secrets’ in their book A Master's Guide to Building a Bamboo Fly Rod.

== In modern fishing ==
Bamboo rods produce a smooth, fluid backcast which provides its own 'damping' effect at the end of the backcast. The forward cast accelerates the line throw through the air with the same 'damping' effect at the beginning of the cast, and then again at the end of the cast as the caster lays the line out over the target water—generally with smooth, precise placement. Expert fisherman and enthusiasts alike have heralded the performance of the bamboo rod as being likened to that of a fine musical instrument. Master craftsman and bamboo innovators such as: H.L. Leonard, E.W. Edwards, and Everett Garrison have elevated the bamboo fly rod from the realm of sporting goods to that of fine art.

Split-cane rod making in the United Kingdom is listed as an endangered craft on the Heritage Crafts Red List of Endangered Crafts, with a small number of workshops continuing to produce bespoke bamboo fly rods for collectors and traditional fly fishers. Currently practising makers named in the Red List entry include Luke Bannister in Cornwall, Chris Clemes Fly Rods in London, the Edward Barder Rod Company in Newbury, Berkshire, and Calum Gladstone in Alnwick, Northumberland.

== Care ==
Bamboo rods will benefit from extra care from their owners. With a little extra maintenance, a bamboo fly rod can be used for many decades. The rods should be cleaned and stored in a cool, dry place away from sunlight. Owners are encouraged to avoid bending the rod at acute angles when playing a fish and rod sections should be separated when not in use. The extra care required to maintain these natural fiber instruments guarantees a long life of use. For this reason, bamboo fly rods decades or even centuries old, are still valued by anglers today.

== See also ==
- Fly fishing
- H.L. Leonard
- E.W. Edwards
- Everett Garrison
- James Arthur Payne
- Paul H. Young
