= Jean-Louis Nomicos =

French chef (born 1967)

- Born: 4 June 1967 (age 58); Marseille, Bouches-du-Rhône, France
- Culinary career
- Rating(s): Michelin stars
- Current restaurant(s): Les Tablettes Jean-Louis Nomicos (Paris)
- Previous restaurant(s): Lasserre (Paris)
- Website: www.lestablettesdejeanlouisnomicos.com

Jean-Louis Nomicos (born 4 June 1967) is a French chef, one star at the Guide Michelin.

== Early life and education ==
Jean-Louis Nomicos spent his childhood in Allauch, a small village located between Aubagne and Aix-en-Provence. At the age of twelve, he became interested in Provençal cuisine looking at the book of Jean-Baptiste Reboul, bible of Provençal cuisine, that both of his grandmothers used to cook famous Mediterranean recipes.

Jean-Louis Nomicos obtained his CAP (Certificat d'Aptitude Professionnelle) in cooking and pastry in a professional training course at the hotel school of Marseille and the restaurant L'Oursinade with the chef René Alloin in Marseille.

== Professional career ==
At the age of 18, he joined Alain Ducasse at his restaurant La Terrasse in Juan-les-Pins. In 1986, he followed Alain Ducasse in Monaco to open the restaurant L'Horloge. After that, Jean-Louis Nomicos spent a year and a half as a sous-chef at the Vistaero Palace hotel in Roquebrune-Cap-Martin. In 1990, he joined again Alain Ducasse at the Hôtel de Paris Monte-Carlo and stayed there for eight years. During that period, he traveled around the world with alain Ducasse, especially in Asia, Europe, North America and South America.

In 1997, Alain Ducasse offered him the opportunity to become the chef of the restaurant La Grande Cascade in Paris at the Bois de Boulogne where he received his first star at the Guide Michelin. Between 2001 and 2010, he became the chef of the famous restaurant Lasserre where he received two Michelin stars.

In December 2010, Joël Robuchon left his restaurant located avenue Bugeaud in Paris, and Jean-Louis Nomicos succeeded opening his own restaurant Les Tablettes Jean-Louis Nomicos, which currently has one Michelin star.

== Bibliography ==
- Lasserre, Créations Jean-Louis Nomicos (Preface by Alain Ducasse), Favre, 2007

== See also ==
- List of Michelin starred restaurants
