= François-Joseph Bérardier de Bataut =

French teacher, writer and translator

François-Joseph Bérardier de Bataut (Paris 1720 – Paris 1794) was a French teacher, writer and translator living in the Age of Enlightenment.

== Biography ==
François-Joseph Bérardier de Bataut is born in Paris in 1720. Having studied theology, he became professor of rhetoric at the Collège du Plessis a part of the University of Paris. He is the author, notably, of a Précis de l'histoire universelle (Treaty of Universal History) which was very much appreciated by his contemporaries, and of the Essai sur le récit (Essay on Narrative), a fictional dialogue on how to tell good stories, as well as the translator of Melchior de Polignac's L'Anti-Lucrèce.

== Works ==
- Précis de l'histoire universelle, Paris : Hérissant fils, 1766, in-8°, XII-383 p. (A second edition is published by C.-P. Berton in 1776, and a third one, "revue, corrigée et augmentée" by Charles-Constant Letellier in 1823.)
- Essai sur le récit, ou Entretiens sur la manière de raconter, par M. l'abbé Bérardier de Bataut, Paris : C.-P. Berton, 1776, in-12°, X-725 p. (There is a commented electronic edition by Christof Schöch, www.berardier.org, 2010.)
- L'Anti-Lucrèce en vers françois, translated by François-Joseph Bérardier de Bataut, Paris : C.-P. Berton, 1786. (The original version was written in Latin by Melchior de Polignac (1661–1744) and was first published posthumously in 1747; it was a great success and was frequently translated into French during the 18th century.)

== Secondary sources ==
=== Biographical articles ===
Note that some biographical articles dating back to the beginning of the 19th century confuse François-Joseph Bérardier de Bataut and the abbot Denis Bérardier. The following list only indicates reliable sources.

- Art. " Bérardier de Bataut (François-Joseph) ", in: Les siècles littéraires de la France, ou nouveau dictionnaire historique, critique et bibliographique, par N. L. M. Desessarts, Paris : Desessarts, an VIII (1800), p. 221.
- Art. « Bérardier de Bataut (François-Joseph) », in: Dictionnaire universel, historique, critique et bibliographique, neuvième édition, Paris : Prudhomme fils, 1812, tome XIX, supplément, p. 61.
- Art. « Bérardier de Bataut (François-Joseph) », in: Examen critique et complément des dictionnaires historiques les pas répandus, par Antoine-Alexandre Barbier. Paris : Rey et Gravier, 1820, pp. 100–101.
- Art. « Bérardier de Bataut (François-Joseph) », in : Dictionnaire des lettres françaises : Le XVIIIe siècle, nouvelle édition sous la direction de François Moureau, Paris : Le Livre de poche, 1995, p. 173.

=== Contemporary reviews of Bérardiers works ===
- (Anon.), « Lettre VI : Essai sur le récit », in: L’Année littéraire 6, 1776, pp. 121–137
- (Anon.), « Essai sur le récit », in: Journal encyclopédique 8, 1776, pp. 273–286.
- (Anon.), « Lettre III : L'Anti-Lucrèce en vers françois, par M. l'Abbé Bérardier de Bataut, in: L’Année littéraire 6, 1786, pp. 46–63.

=== Critical analyses ===
- Adam, Jean-Michel, « L'Analyse linguistique du récit : rhétorique, poétique et pragmatique textuelle », in: Zeitschrift für französische Sprache und Literatur, 100, 1990, pp. 7–24.
- Albertan(-Coppola), Sylviane, « La poésie au service de l'apologétique. L'Anti-Lucrèce en vers français de Bérardier de Bataut », in : Cahiers Roucher-André Chénier 10–11, 1990–1991, pp. 137–148.
- Sgard, Jean. « Poétique des vies particulières », in: Les Vies de Voltaire : discours et représentations biographiques, XVIIIe-XXIe siècles, ed. Christophe Cave & Simon Davies. Oxford : Voltaire Foundation, SVEC 2008:4, 2008, pp. 29–41. (The section 'Poétique du récit' is devoted almost exclusively to the Essai sur le récit.)
