= Georgiana Viou =

Chef from Benin (born 1977)

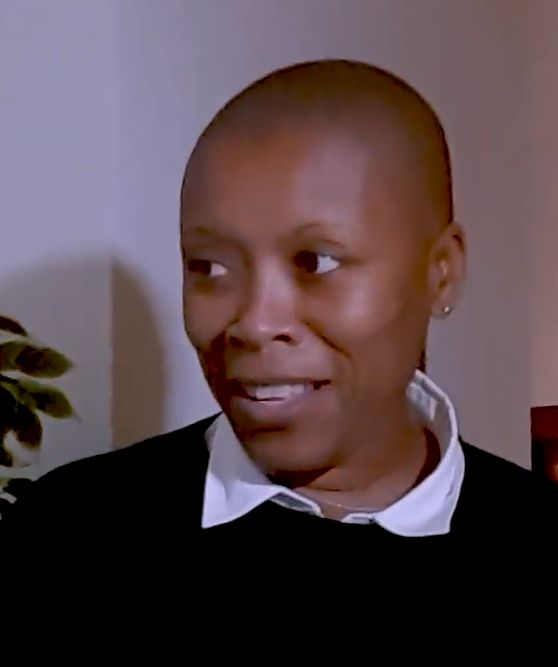
- Viou in 2022
- Born: 1977 (age 48–49); Cotonou, Benin
- Education: Sorbonne University
- Known for: First black woman chef in France to be awarded a Michelin Star
- Culinary career
- Cooking style: Mediterranean cuisine, Beninese
- Rating(s): Michelin Guide, 2023
- Current restaurant: Rouge (2021-current)
- Previous restaurant(s): L'Atelier de Georgiana, Chez Georgiana, La Piscine
- Television show: MasterChef France
- Award(s) won: Prix Taittinger des Cordons Bleus, Gault Millau "Dotation Jeunes Talents", Grand de Demain

Georgiana Viou (born 1977) is a chef from Benin. Viou specializes in Mediterranean cuisine with an African touch. In 2023, she became the first black female chef in France to be awarded a Michelin star. She is a judge for MasterChef France and a cookbook author.

== Biography ==
=== Early life and education ===
Georgiana Viou was born in 1977 in Cotonou, Benin. Growing up in Benin, she learned to cook from her mother. She moved to Paris at age 22 to study languages at the Sorbonne. Her dream was to be a conference translator. With the birth of her first child, she rekindled her fascination with cooking, and soon began to gain experience by working in restaurant kitchens.

After graduation, she moved to Marseille, where she worked in a communications agency during the day and in restaurants at night, where she began to develop her cooking skills. Viou is self-taught, and credits her time in Marseille's restaurant kitchens for teaching her everything she knew.

=== Professional chef ===
At age 33, Viou left her translation work behind to work full time in kitchens. In 2008, Viou was first seen on television when taking part in the first season of Un dîner presque parfait. Encouraged by friends, she applied for MasterChef France, where she reached the finals.

In 2011, she opened her first cooking school and restaurant, "L'Atelier de Georgiana". The same year she released her first book, Géorgiana - Ma cuisine de Marseille. Viou's cuisine is Mediterranean, specifically Provençal, but influenced from her roots in Benin. She does not regard her technique as fusion cuisine, which she considers "messy". In 2015, Viou opened Chez Georgiana, but it closed the next year after differences with investors.

=== Rouge ===
In 2021, she opened "Rouge", a restaurant and bar in Nîmes. At Rouge she was awarded the prestigious Grand de Demain award from Gault & Millau. This year she additionally published her second book, Le goût de Cotonou, ma cuisine du Bénin.

In 2022, she returned to television for the new series of MasterChef France, this time as a judge.

In 2023, Rouge and head chef Viou received a Michelin star. With the honor, Viou became the first black female chef in France to be awarded a Michelin star. She was the only single woman chef to receive a Michelin star in 2023.

== Publications ==
- 2011 Géorgiana - Ma cuisine de Marseille ISBN 978-2357200647
- 2021 Le goût de Cotonou - Ma cuisine du Bénin ISBN 978-2379450655

== See also ==
- List of female chefs with Michelin stars
- Anthony Bourdain: Parts Unknown, Viou features in Season 6 of the series when the show visits Marseille
- Adejoké Bakare, first black woman to earn a Michelin star in the United Kingdom
