= MasterChef France =

French television series

MasterChef France is a French television series broadcast on TF1 in France. It premiered on August 19, 2010. It is produced by Shine France and has run for four seasons and the first part of the fifth season on TF1. It was moved to NT1 for the last part of the fifth season before being canceled. The original presenter, Carole Rousseau, was controversially removed from the programme in 2013.

Michel Roux Jr, a judge in the original British series, has stated that he believes the British MasterChef should be more ambitious and emulate some of the content of the French version. The series was revived on France 2 in September 2022.

== Plot ==
A large number of amateur chefs compete in the MasterChef France kitchen to impress three judges in order to become the MasterChef France winner.

== Series overview ==
Season	Contestants	Episodes	Originally released		Winner	Runner(s)-up
Season	Contestants	Episodes	First released	Last released	Winner	Runner(s)-up
1	20	12	August 19, 2010	November 4, 2010	Anne Alassane	Marine Crousnillon
2	21	12	August 18, 2011	November 3, 2011	Élisabeth Biscarrat	Xavier Malandran
3	19	12	August 23, 2012	November 8, 2012	Ludovic Dumont	Pierre Lefebvre
4	18	12	September 20, 2013	December 20, 2013	Marc Boissieux	Marie-Hélène Metu
5	12	8	June 25, 2015	September 3, 2015	Khanh-Ly Huynh	Philippe Jacquin
6	18	6	August 23, 2022	September 27, 2022	Marc-Amaury Legrand	Clara Galand

== Seasons ==
=== Season 1 (2010) ===
The first season ran from August 19 to November 4, 2010.

==== Contestants ====
Contestant	Age	Hometown	Occupation	Status
Anne Alassane	33	Yvelines, Île-de-France	Farmer	Winner November 4
Marine Lucenê	31	Fort-de-France, Martinique	French teacher	Runner-Up November 4
Romain Jacquet	24	Paris, Île-de-France	Air conditioning company manager	2nd Runner-Up November 4
Agathe Accôn	28	Guyane, French Guiana	Waitress	3rd Runner-Up November 4
Cyril Leidermer	36	Cher, Centre-Val de Loire	Executive in mass distribution	Eliminated October 28
Virginie Limpopo	27	Calvados, Normandy	Stylist and make-up artist	Eliminated October 28
Audrey Poret	43	Paris, Île-de-France	Housewife	Eliminated October 21
Philippe Montesieur	33	Gard, Occitanie	English teacher	Eliminated October 21
Frédéric Mesusia	39	Gironde, Nouvelle-Aquitaine	Bartender	Eliminated October 14
Joël Peries	30	Aube, Grand Est	Ready-to-lend store assistant	Eliminated October 14
Cédric Longeraux	39	Indre, Centre-Val de Loire	Businessman	Eliminated October 7
Corinne Brideskei	40	Bas-Rhin, Grand Est	Secretary	Eliminated October 7
Georgiana Vicine	52	Val-de-Marne, Île-de-France	Housewife	Eliminated September 30
Steve Dorcas	35	Bouches-du-Rhône, Région Sud	Management Consultant	Eliminated September 30
Philippe Clementin	42	Paris, Île-de-France	Press officer	Eliminated September 23
Thomas Escobar	38	Côte-d'Or, Bourgogne-Franche-Comté	Pharmaceutical consulting manager	Eliminated September 23
Julien Cavalhero	21	Haute-Garonne, Occitanie	Medicine student	Eliminated September 16
Baïa Navatepe	18	Pyrénées-Orientales, Occitanie	Student	Eliminated September 16
Jérôme Coveda	23	Mayenne, Pays de la Loire	Professional skater	Eliminated September 9
Nathalie Matéro	40	Basse-Terre, Guadeloupe	French teacher	Eliminated September 9

=== Season 2 (2011) ===
The second season ran from August 18 to November 3, 2011.

=== Season 3 (2012) ===
The third season ran from August 23 to November 8, 2012.

=== Season 4 (2013) ===
The fourth season ran from September 20 to December 20, 2013.

=== Season 5 (2015) ===
The fifth season ran from June 25 to September 3, 2015.

=== Season 6 (2022) ===
The sixth season ran on France 2 from August 23, 2022.

== See also ==
- List of French Adaptations of Television Series from Other Countries
- Georgiana Viou, chef from Benin who appeared in the first season of the show, and later returned as a judge for the sixth season
