= Paya, Kyain Seikgyi =

Paya
- Location in Myanmar
- Coordinates: 15°46′0″N 97°57′0″E
- Country: Myanmar
- State: Kayin State
- District: Kawkareik District
- Township: Kyain Seikgyi Township

Population
  - Religions: Buddhism
- Time zone: UTC+6.30 (MST)
- Area code: 58

Paya(Burmese: ဖာယာ; [pʰàjà]) is a village in Kyain Seikgyi Township, Kawkareik District, in the Kayin State of Myanmar. It is the home of Paya Taung.
