= Joseph François (Seychelles politician) =

Seychelles politician

Member of the Seychelles People's Progressive Front

Personal details
- Occupation: Politician

Joseph François is a member of the National Assembly of Seychelles. He is a member of the Seychelles People's Progressive Front, and was first elected to the Assembly in 2007.
