= Everett Garrison =

Engineer and fishing-rod maker

Edmund Everett Garrison (b. winter of 1893, Yonkers, New York; d. February 8, 1975, Ossining, New York, United States) was a structural and electrical engineer known as a maker of bamboo fly rods and co-author of A Master's Guide To Building A Bamboo Fly Rod. Everett Garrison's methods and designs have been utilized by generations of bamboo fly rod makers. His rods fetch high prices from collectors.

== Early life ==
Everett Garrison was born in Yonkers in the winter of 1893. He was of Dutch ancestry. His father was an engineer who held two degrees from Columbia University. His family owned and operated a steam driven barge business along the Hudson River. Garrison grew up in Yonkers and went on to study electrical engineering at Union College, where he earned a degree in 1916. He tested steel for Curtiss-Wright aircraft engines, and later became involved in railroad construction. He also lived in Staten Island and Ossining, New York. He was married to Charlotte Goff.

== Innovator of bamboo rod building ==
In 1922, Garrison met George Parker Holden, author of The Idyll of the Split-Bamboo. Initially, Garrison was interested in bamboo construction as a way to improve the shafts on his golf clubs and began to visit Holden at his house in Yonkers. Both men were avid golfers, both also shared a love of fly fishing. It was there that Garrison made his first bamboo fly rods.

In 1927, when expecting his second child, Garrison suffered from a neurological malady coupled with a debilitating depression, during which time he turned to designing a new type of bamboo fly rod. Whereas other rod designers had been using empirical methods, Garrison used engineering principles to create the foundations for his revolutionary taper designs. From a hospital bed, Garrison used an understanding of casting mechanics and the physical properties of bamboo to derive a stress analysis formula to use as a basis for plotting the final dimensions of a fly rod.

Everett Garrison had many other credits to his name in the world of fly fishing. He coined the term "Parabolic Fly Rod" to describe an early prototype belonging to Charles Ritz. He also designed the tools needed to hand-split and hand-plane the bamboo used in his rods, including an adjustable planing form and a glue binding machine that were capable of holding tolerances to .001" which are in common usage to this day.

Garrison first reached acclaim when he made rods for author John Alden Knight and members of The Anglers' Club of New York, for whom Garrison gave a lecture on rodmaking in 1933. John Alden Knight described Garrison in the book The Modern Angler as a meticulous craftsman capable of unique precision.

The appearance of Everett Garrison's rods reflect his ethos of design and construction. The relatively small number of rods he made during his career are a tribute to quality craftsmanship and a philosophy of performance through simplicity of design. The aesthetics of his fishing rods were not concerned with artifice or embellishment and were never altered.

He worked at his craft nights and weekends until he retired from a structural engineering firm in 1972, after which he built rods and perfected his equipment full-time until his health began to fail in 1974. He died on February 8, 1975. It is estimated he made approximately 650 rods in his lifetime.

Hoagy B. Carmichael was making the documentary film Creating the Garrison Fly Rod when he became an apprentice to Garrison. They were collaborating on a book when Garrison died. Carmichael completed the manuscript using notebooks, recordings and photographs. When published in 1977, A Master's Guide to Building a Bamboo Fly Rod made accessible to hobbyists and enthusiasts the methods of a craft that had previously been shrouded in secrecy.
