= Claude-François de Payan =

Political figure of the French Revolution

Claude-François de Payan (4 May 1766, Saint-Paul-Trois-Châteaux - 28 July 1794, Paris) was a political figure of the French Revolution.

He was guillotined 28 July 1794 with 21 others during the Thermidorian Reaction, including Saint-Just and Robespierre.

== Life ==
=== Early career ===
Payan was from a noble family in the Dauphiné, descended from the count palatines, which had held important army and magistrate posts. His father was the squire François de Payan and so Claude-François naturally joined an artillery regiment before the Revolution. On the Revolution he was highly enthused by the new ideas and fully subscribed to them. His elder brother Joseph-François de Payan was also a revolutionary.

== Sources ==
- John Hardman (2018). Robespierre. Taylor & Francis. p. 82. ISBN 978-1-317-87460-7.
- (in French) Albert Soboul, Dictionnaire historique de la Révolution française, Paris, PUF, 2005
- (in French) Notes et archives 1789–1794
