= Denis Bérardier =

French priest and theologian

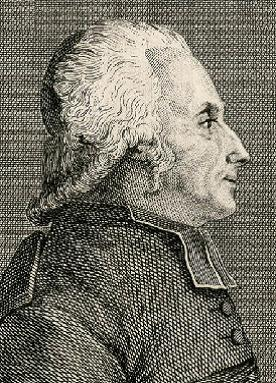
Denis Bérardier

Denis Bérardier (1735–1794) was a French priest and theologian. He was born at Quimper, in Brittany 26 March 1735 and died at Paris 1 May 1794. He was one of the deputies from the Paris clergy to the Estates-General of 1789.

== Biography ==
Bérardier was raised by his grandfather Pierre Bousquet, who had been the founder of the Quimper pottery in 1708. He attended the Jesuit college at Quimper, and then the Sorbonne, where he obtained a doctorate in theology. After the expulsion of the Jesuits from France in 1762, he was appointed Principal of the college at Quimper. He was interested in physics, conducting researches into electricity and founding a physics class at the college.

Bérardier was not on good terms with Toussaint Francois Joseph Conen of St. Luke, the new Bishop of Cornouaille, whose seat was in Quimper and who asserted jurisdiction over the college. He therefore obtained a transfer in 1778 to the extremely prestigious Lycée Louis-le-Grand in Paris, also formerly run by the Jesuits; he also was one of the syndics of the Paris Faculty of Theology. Among his students were Camille Desmoulins and Maximilien Robespierre,

== Political career ==
In 1789, when King Louis XVI was forced to summon the Estates-General, he was elected as one of the representatives of the Paris clergy to the Second Estate. When the Etats-General were reconstituted as the National Assembly and then the National Constituent Assembly. he took his place with the conservative element, seated on the right side of the assembly.

He, along with many of the French clergy, opposed the revolutionary Civil Constitution of the Clergy that formalized the nationalization of church property and dissolved the remaining monastic establishments.

== Writings ==
- Les principes de la foi sur le gouvernement de l'église en opposition avec la constitution civile du clergé ou Réfutation du développement de l'opinion de M. Camus. Par l'Abbé Bérardier, docteur & ancien syndic de la faculté de Théologie de Paris (1791)
- L'Église constitutionnelle confondue par elle-même, par une Société de théologiens [l'abbé D. Bérardier et l'abbé Blandin]. Ouvrage dans lequel on réfute : 1° l'Accord des vrais principes de l'Église par les dix-huit évêques constitutionnels membres de l'Assemblée constituante; ensemble un écrit du sieur Ollitrault, directeur du séminaire de Quimper, imprimé aux frais du département et répandu avec profusion dans toute la Bretagne; 2° l'Instruction ou catéchisme sur la constitution civile du clergé, par MM. Mainguy et Lanjuinais; 3° la Lettre pastorale de l'évêque du département du Tarn; enfin les principales objections répandues dans tous les autres ouvrages constitutionnels (1792)

== Sources ==
- "La fille du faïencier" de Christian de la Hubaudière, Coop Breizh, Coop-Breizh, 2005, (ISBN 978-2-84346-244-3)
