= Joseph-François de Payan =

French political figure

Joseph-François de Payan, known as Payan-Dumoulin (9 February 1759 in Saint-Paul-Trois-Châteaux – 20 May 1852 in Alixan) was a political figure during the French Revolution, as was his younger brother Claude-François de Payan.
