= James Arthur Payne =

James Arthur Payne (1894 – June 12, 1968) was an American fly rod maker, designer and business owner. He was born in Highland Mills, New York.

The son of E.F. Payne and the owner of the E.F. Payne Rod Company, Payne designed and built bamboo fly rods for almost 70 years. His rods are prized by fishermen and collectors. Experts consider Payne to have been one of the great designers and bamboo rodmakers in the history of fly fishing.

Payne died in Highland Mills on June 12, 1968.
