= Rigi Kulm Hotel =

Hotel in Switzerland

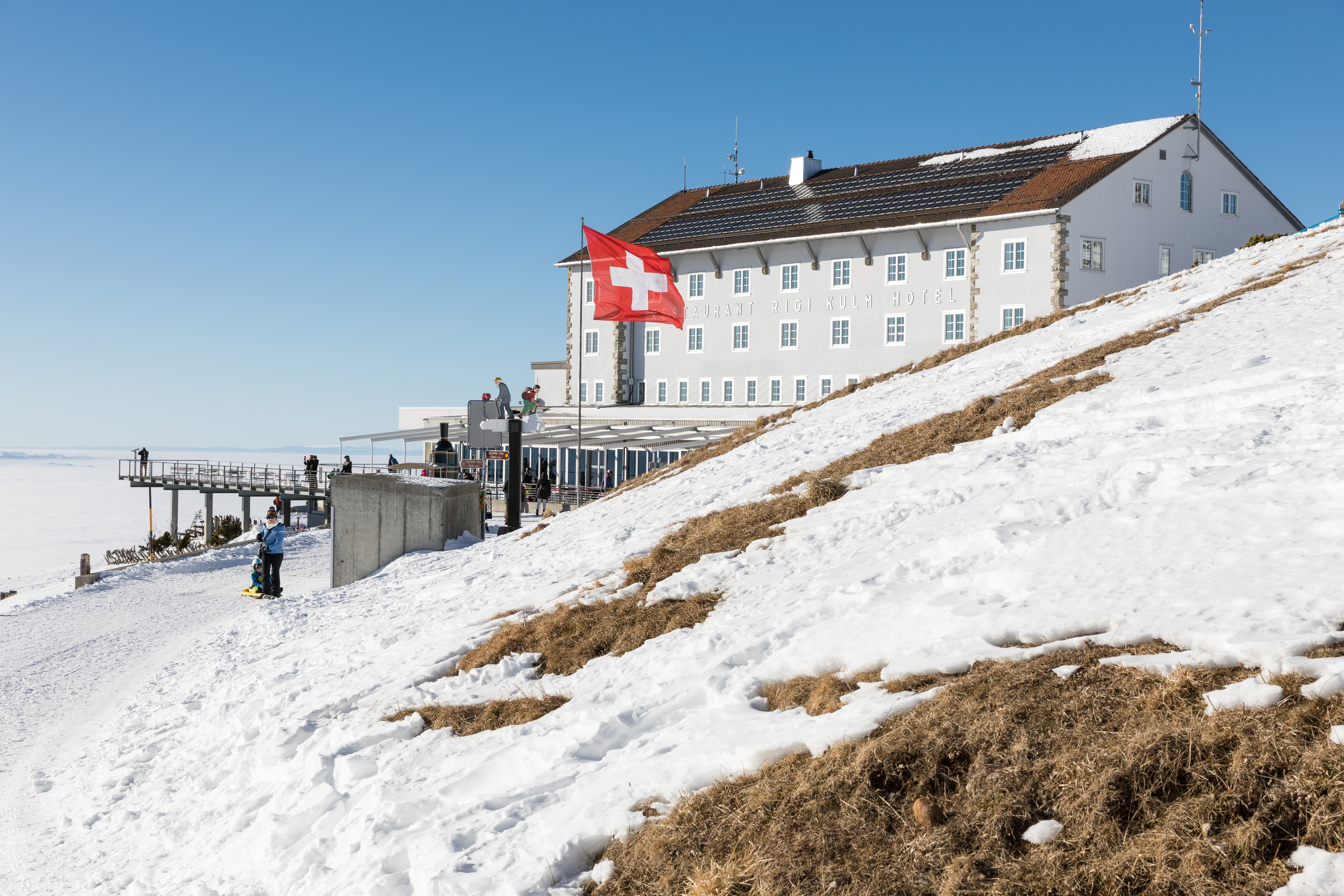
- The hotel in 2017, looking northwest

General information
- Location: Mount Rigi, Canton of Schwyz, Switzerland, Kulmweg 7
- Coordinates: 47.05588°N 8.48399°E
- Opening: 6 August 1816 (210 years ago)

Technical details
- Floor count: 5

Other information
- Parking: No

Website
- rigikulm.ch

The Rigi Kulm Hotel is located immediately below the 1,798 metres (5,899 ft) summit of Mount Rigi in the Alps in the canton of Schwyz, Switzerland, about 10 miles (16 kilometres) south of Zurich and 8 mi (13 km) east of Lucerne. Opened in 1816, it can only be reached on foot or via the Vitznau–Rigi or Arth–Rigi railways. It is said that 125 named peaks and thirteen lakes are visible from the hotel.

== History ==
A wooden hotel was begun in 1814 by Joseph Martin Bürgi, a cloth cutter from Arth. He ran out of funds, however, and the project ceased. The following year, Heinrich Keller, an illustrator from Zurich, began raising funds for the hotel, but the amount proved insufficient. Keller tried again, this time attracting the interest of well-to-do people in Switzerland's largest cities. The hotel opened on 6 August 1816, with its first guests arriving just over a week later.

Bürgi died in 1833, and his son, Caspar Bürgi-Ritschard, and his wife, Elisabeth, assumed ownership.

The second incarnation of the hotel was completed in 1856, designed by Zurich architect Ferdinand Stadler.

On 7 June 1875, hotel number three, owned by Friedrich Schreiber, was opened. Its architect was Horace Edouard Davinet. The Arth-Rigi railway commenced operations shortly beforehand. Ludwig II of Bavaria was one of the hotel's guests. A tea set he brought is on display in the dining room of today's hotel. Schreiber died in 1912.

Swiss hotelier César Ritz was the manager of the hotel when an incident occurred that changed his career. The central heating at the hotel broke during a frigid day, and a group of forty people were arriving for lunch. Ritz changed the menu to hot dishes, moved a table into the smaller drawing room, and heated forty bricks in the oven to be wrapped in flannel cloths placed at the footstool of each guest. This quick thinking was noticed by Max Pfyffer, the designer of the Grand Hotel National in Lucerne, who noted his efficiency in a scrapbook.

After a period of decline during the two world wars, the Käppeli family, headed by building contractor Ernst Käppeli, purchased the hotel in 1949.

The current building was completed in 1954. It was renovated in 1994. The 200th anniversary of there being a hotel at the location was celebrated in 2016.

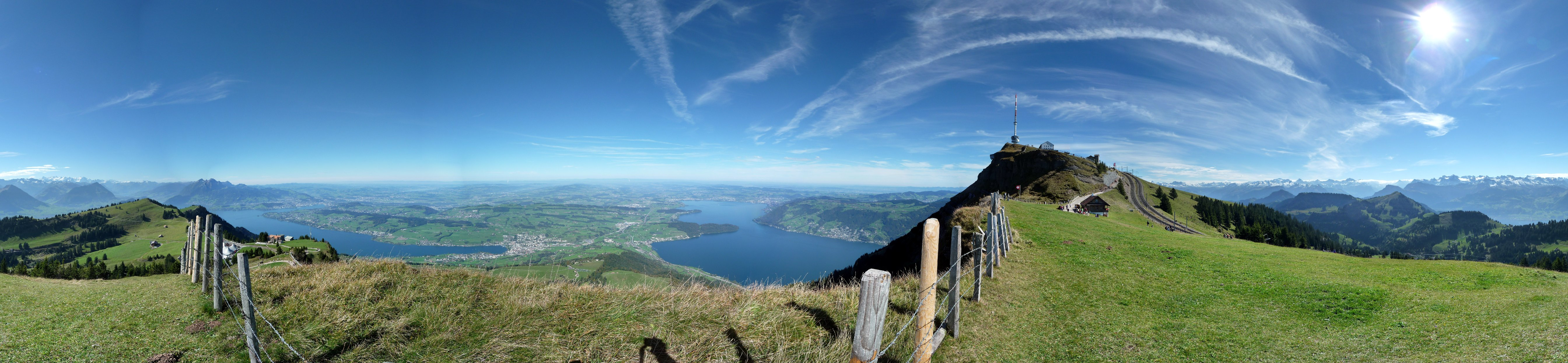
Looking north. From left to right: Lake Lucerne, Lake Zug and the Rigi Kulm Hotel

== Through the years ==
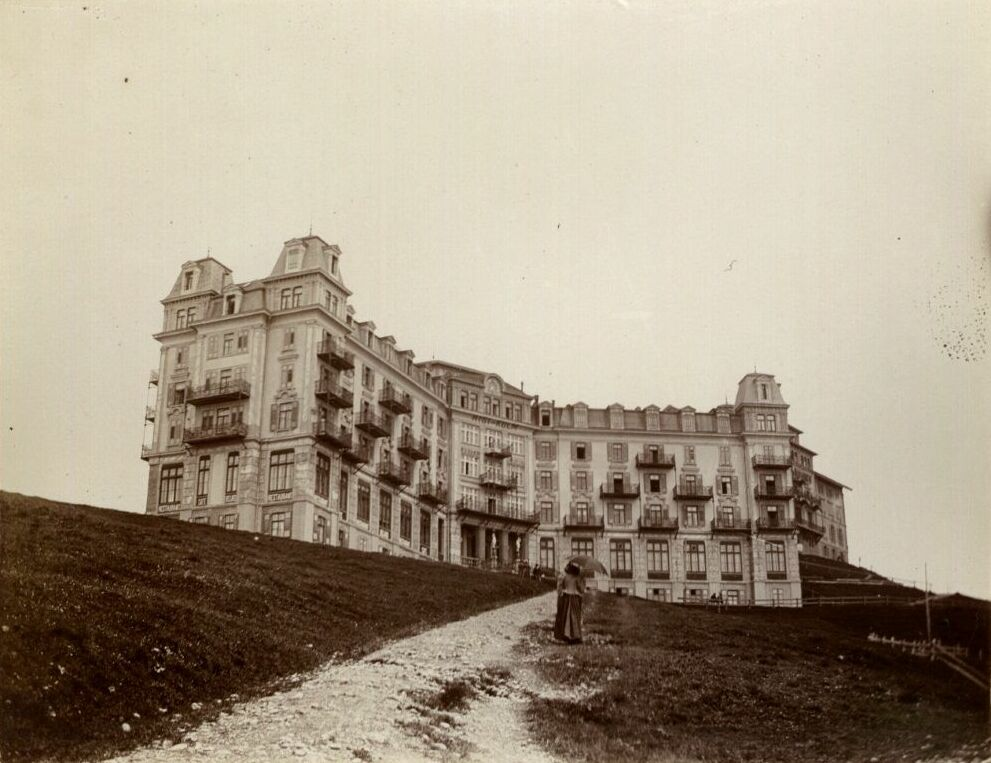
c. 1905

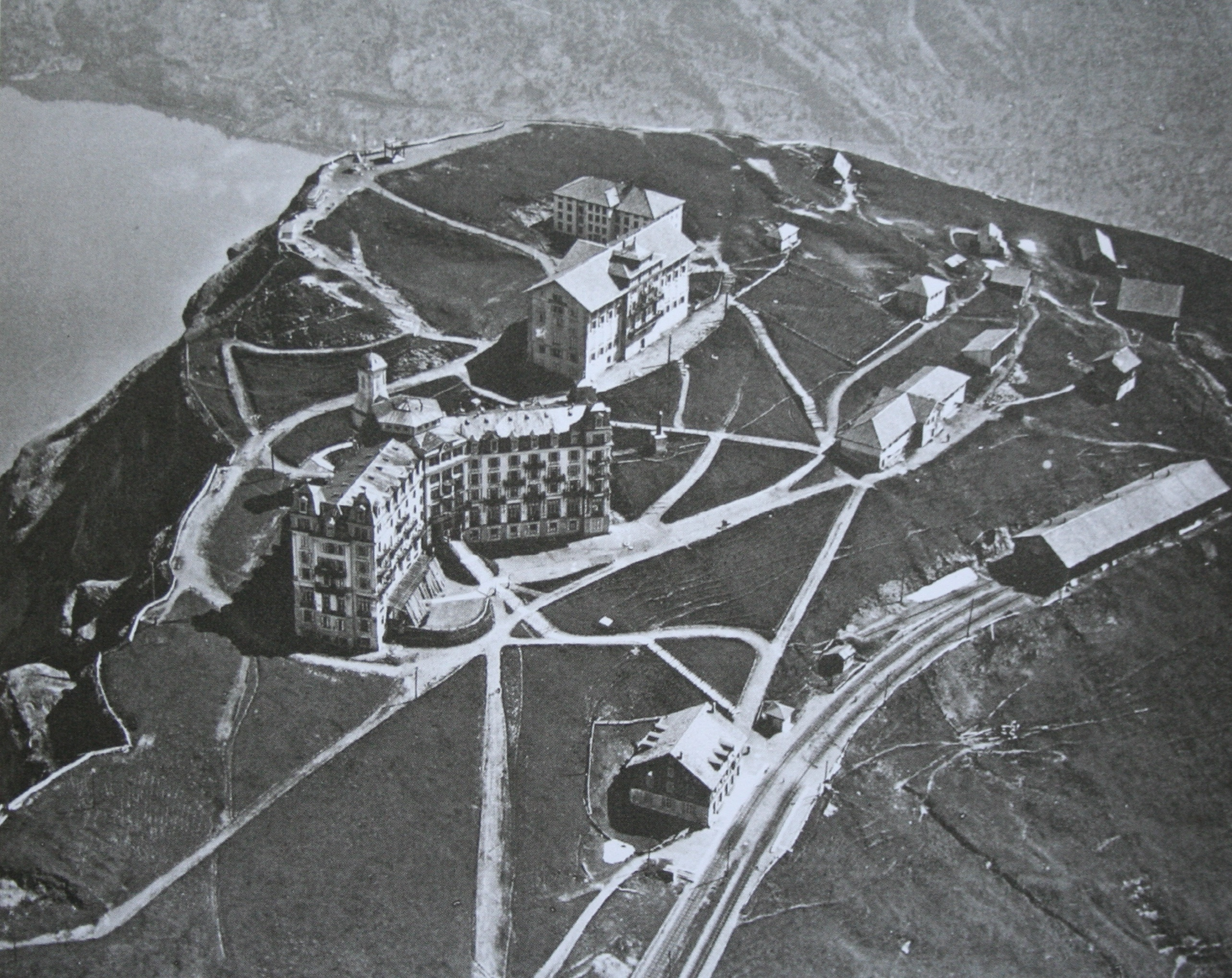
1920

== See also ==
- List of hotels in Switzerland
- Tourism in Switzerland
