= Baron Phyffer d'Altinhosen =

Baron Pfyffer d'Altinhosen may refer to:

- Alphons Maximilian Pfyffer von Altishofen
- Hans Pfyffer
