= Hans Pfyffer =

His Excellency Hans Pfyffer von Altishofen
- Pfyffer golfing near Lucerne in 1921

Minister of Mission of Switzerland to Poland
- In office 22 October 1921 – 31 October 1923

Member of the Grand Council of Lucerne
- In office 1911–1922

Personal details
- Born: Hans Pfyffer von Altishofen; 28 March 1866 Lucerne, Switzerland
- Died: 5 April 1953 (aged 87) Lucerne, Switzerland
- Spouse: Josephine Reichmann (m. 1893)
- Relations: Pfyffer family
- Children: 1
- Occupation: Businessman, hotelier, politician

Military service
- Allegiance: Switzerland
- Branch/service: Swiss Armed Forces
- Years of service: 1888–1918
- Rank: Colonel General

Hans Pfyffer von Altishofen (German: [ˈpfʏfɐ fɔn ˈʔaltɪʃoːfən]; 28 March 1866 – 5 April 1953) abbreviated as Hans Pfyffer was a Swiss businessman, hotelier, politician and diplomat who served as Minister to the Mission of Switzerland to Poland in Warsaw from 1921 to 1923. He concurrently served on Grand Council of Lucerne between 1911 and 1922. He previously was a conservative member of the City Council of Lucerne.

Born into a well established Patrician family, Pfyffer became a serial entrepreneur, primarily in the hospitality industry. Between 1890 and 1950 he was the general manager and majority owner of the Grand Hotel National. In 1892, he was among the co-founders of Berneralpen Milchgesellschaft (milk powder), among César Ritz and Auguste Escoffier. He also served on the board of directors of CKW (power supply), Papierfabrik Perlen (paper mill) and the Vitznau-Rigi railway line as well as member of the bank council of the Swiss National Bank from 1927 to 1939 and 1943 to 1947. He was also president of the Lucerne Cantonal Bank.

== Early life and education ==
Pfyffer von Altishofen was born 28 March 1866 in Lucerne, Switzerland, the second of six children, to Alphons Maximilian Pfyffer von Altishofen, an architect, hotelier and military officer, and Maria Anna Pfyffer von Altishofen (née Segesser von Brunegg). He was baptized Johann Hans Georg Emil Karl which was abbreviated as Hans. His father built and managed Grand Hotel National in Lucerne.

His siblings were; Alphons-Heinrich Pfyffer von Altishofen (1863–1929), Maria Mathilde Pestalozzi (née Pfyffer von Altishofen; 1864–1933), Georgine Elmiger (née Pfyffer von Altishofen; 1868–1936), Mathilde Pfyffer von Altishofen (1870–1943) and Robert Pfyffer von Altishofen (1873–1938). He hailed from well established Patrician families on both his paternal and maternal side.

After completing his Matura, Pfyffer began to study medicine, but abandoned his plans after his father died and ultimately entered the family business, the Grand Hotel National in Lucerne.

== Career ==
Between 1890 and 1950, Pfyffer was manager or a member of the executive board of the Grand Hotel National from 1890 to 1950. His younger brother Alphons Pfyffer went with César Ritz to Rome, where they opened the Grand-Hotel. Alphons later became director of the Ritz-Schöpfung and the Excelsior in Rome.

In 1892 César Ritz founded the "Berneralpen Milchgesellschaft" (Bernese Alps Milk Company) which soon became the largest employer in the Konolfingen area. Hans Pfyffer became a partner, as did Auguste Escoffier. In 1893 Pfyffer married Josephine Maria Johanna Reichmann, daughter of the industrialist Heinrich Reichmann of Warsaw. In 1894 Pfyffer was made Captain of the General Staff of the Swiss army, and in 1917 became a Colonel. From 1917 to 1919 he commanded the Gotthard force. He was a Conservative member of the Lucerne city council (Stadtrat) from 1899 to 1911, and from 1911 to 1922 was a member of the city parliament (Grosser Stadtrat). He was a director of various enterprises in central Switzerland including power plants, paper mills and the Vitznau–Rigi Railway. From 1908 to 1945 he sat on the board of the Luzerner Kantonalbank, of which he was president from 1912 to 1945. From 1922 to 1924 he was Swiss envoy in Warsaw.

Pfyffer was a passionate promoter of tourism in the Lucerne region, and through his efforts managed to preserve the Grand Hotel National with little damage during the two world wars and the intervening financial crisis. Pfyffer cofounded the Lucerne Golf Club in 1902 with a 9-hole course on the Dietschiberg, expanded to 18 holes in 1925. Pfyffer was close to Caesar Ritz, and became president of the Hôtel Ritz Paris, and of the board of the Ritz-Carlton Hotel Company in London. Pfyffer once pointed out to Ritz that although the rose brocade-covered dining chairs at the Paris hotel were comfortable, the guests would stay at table longer if the chairs had arms. Ritz at once ordered all the chairs to be replaced. The 1948 biography of Cesar Ritz by his wife, Marie Louise Ritz, was dedicated to Colonel Hans Pfyffer d'Altishofon.

== Personal life ==
In 1893, Pfyffer married "Josephine" Maria Johanna Reichmann (died 1955), a daughter of Heinrich Reichmann, an industrialist, originally of Warsaw. They had one son;

- Hans-Heinrich Alphons Pfyffer von Altishofen (31 July 1896 – 4 October 1916), died without issue.

Pfyffer died in Lucerne on 5 April 1953 aged 87.

== Sources ==
- "CESAR RITZ". Old Cooks Books.
- "DIE GESCHICHTE". Lucerne Golf Club. Archived from the original on 2015-06-23.
- "History of the hotel". The Most Famous Hotels in the World.
- Lischer, Markus (2010-09-28). "Pfyffer, Hans (von Altishofen)". Historischen Lexikon der Schweiz (in German).
- Nubani, Linda Nayif (2001-11-21). "DELVING INTO THE ATTRIBUTES THAT MADE LUXURY HOTELS".
- "Pfyffer von Altishofen, Hans, 1866-1953 (Autoritätseintragungen)". Helvetic Archives.
- Stucki, Von Lorenz (1968-11-08). "Päpstlicher Gardist wurde Hotelier". Zeit (in German).
- Zürcher, Christoph (2010-09-16). "Berneralpen Milchgesellschaft". Historischen Lexikon der Schweiz (in German).
