= Horace Edouard Davinet =

Franco-Swiss architect, 1839–1922

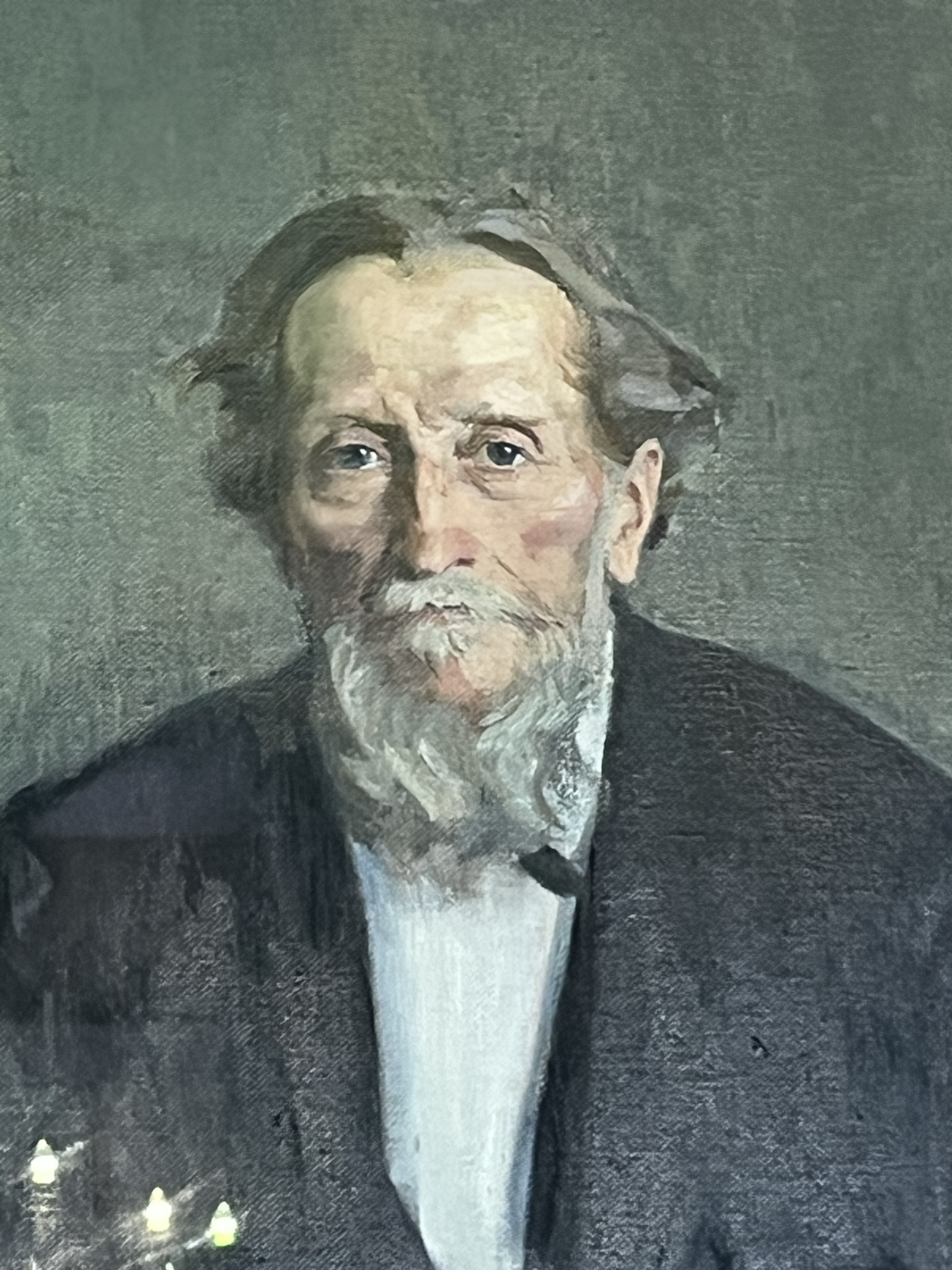
- Born: 23 February 1839
- Died: 30 June 1922 (aged 83)
- Occupation: Architect
- Buildings: Grand Hotel Victoria, Interlaken; Grandhotel Schreiber, Rigi

Horace Edouard Davinet (23 February 1839 – 30 June 1922) was a Franco-Swiss architect. He designed several hotels, including the original Rigi Kulm Hotel at the summit of Rigi mountain in Switzerland.

== Life and career ==
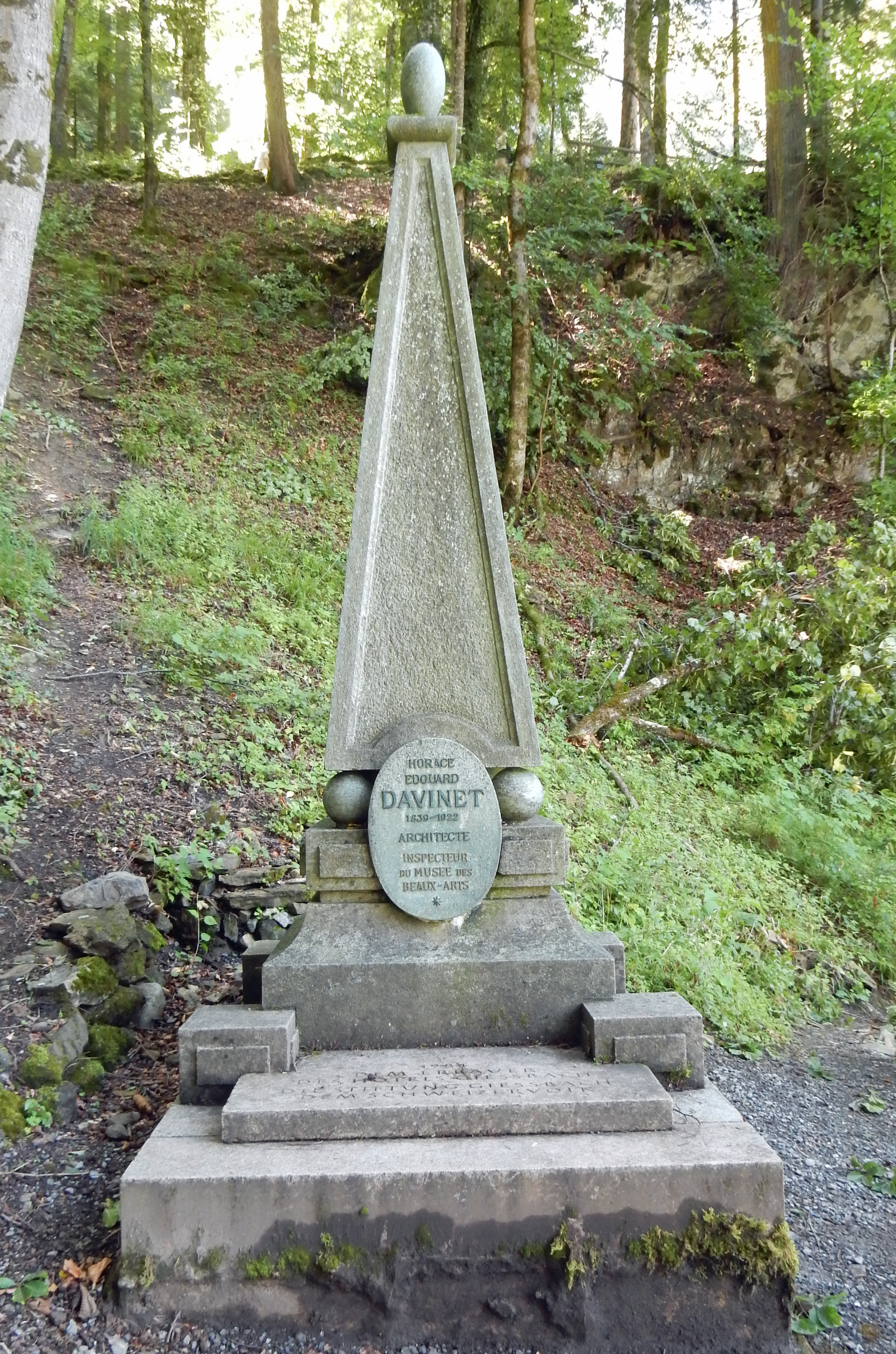
Davinet's headstone at Giessbach, Interlaken

Davinet was born to a French mayor. He attended school in Bourg-en-Bresse.

When his mother died, he lived in Bern and worked as an apprentice with his brother-in-law Jakob Friedrich Struder in 1856. In Struder's office, he was involved with the planning of Bern's Federal Town Hall, the Bernerhof, the Grandhotel Giessbach (in which there is now a suite named for him) and the Jungfraublick in Interlaken.

Between 1862 and 1864, he worked in Stuttgart with Wilhelm Bäumer. He returned to Switzerland in 1864 to assist in the design of the Interlaken's Grand Hotel Victoria. He established an architectural office with Studer in the city in 1866, and later began working on his own.

Davinet designed the Öberlander Hof and the Beau Rivage in Interlaken, the Hotel Victoria in Bern, the Grandhotel Schreiber (today's Rigi Kulm Hotel) on Rigi mountain and the Grand Hotel in Seelisberg.

In 1876, he returned to Bern, where he worked as an architect, entrepreneur and speculator in the construction of the Kirchenfeld. During the 1880s, he began building villas for Bern's elite.

He was appointed Inspector of the Musée des beaux-arts in 1891, eventually leaving the running of his office management to his great-nephew Frédéric Studer, who became a partner in 1904. Studer took over the office nine years later.

Davinet became an honorary citizen of the city of Bern in 1900. The following year, he was elected a member of the Ober-Gerwern Society.

== Death ==
Davinet died on 30 June 1922, aged 83. He is interred at Giessbach, Interlaken.
