= Grand Hotel National =

Swiss luxury hotel

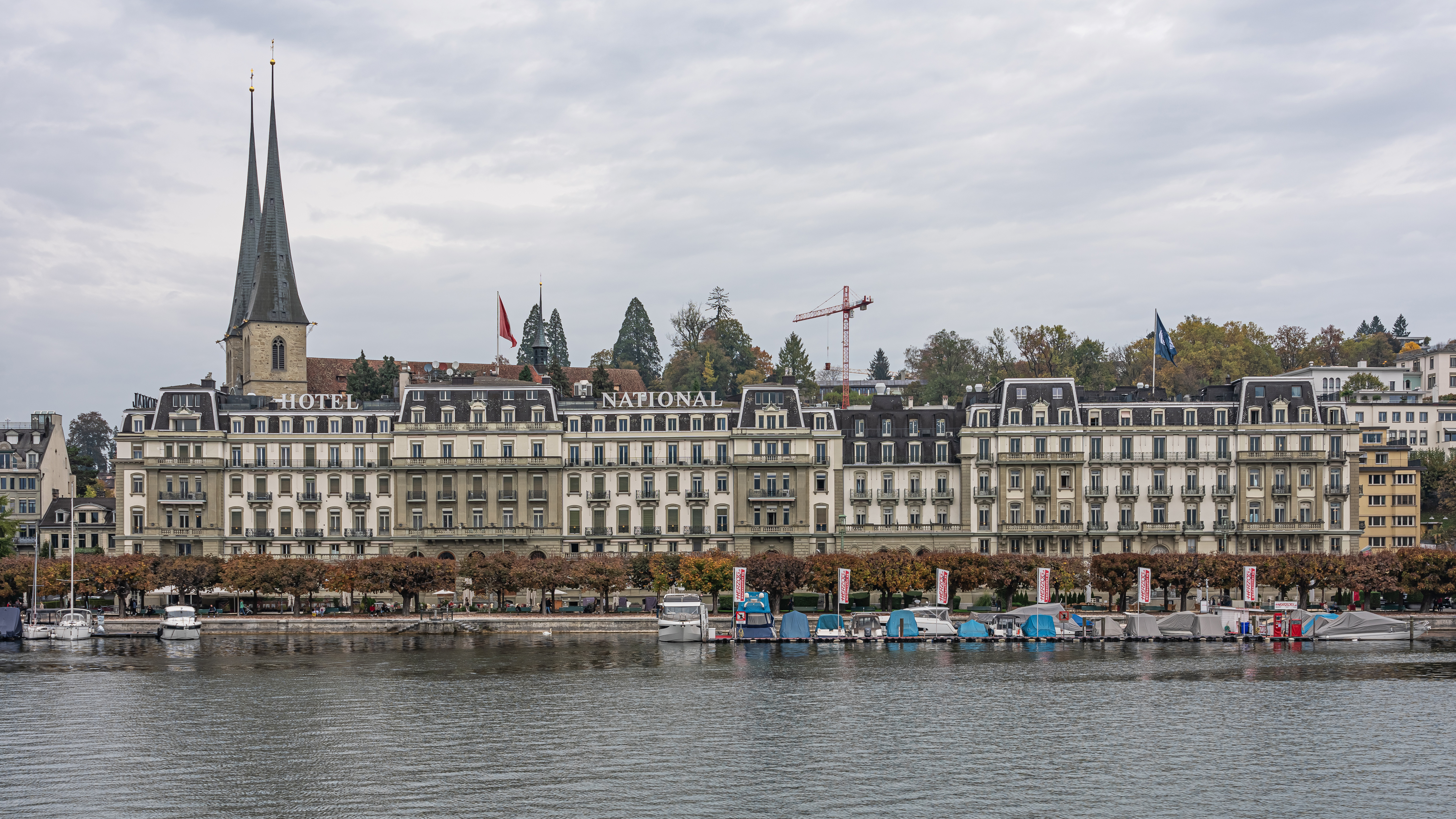
Grand-Hotel National as seen from the lake

The Grand Hotel National is a 5-star hotel in Lucerne, Switzerland, which opened in 1870. Located on the shores of Lake Lucerne, it looks out over Lucerne bay and the Alps of Central Switzerland. It offers 41 rooms and suites as well as 22 residence suites, plus four restaurants, a café and a bar. In terms of its fabric and architecture, the hotel has been designated a cultural monument of national importance, with a Category A heritage protection listing.^{[1]}

== History ==
=== Lakeside promenade: land reclamation and construction ===
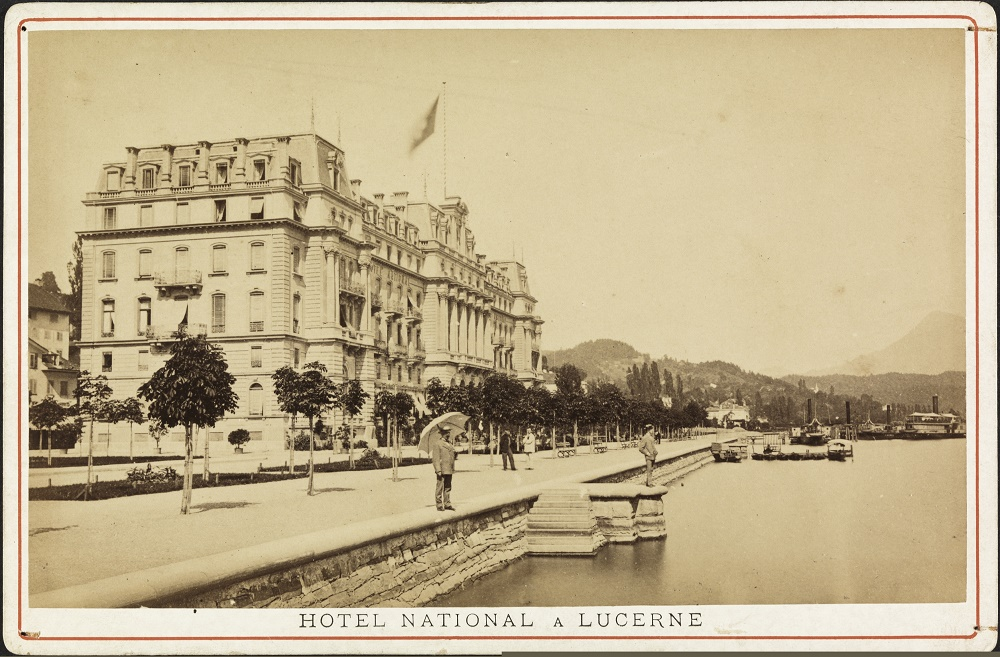

Until well into the 19th century Lucerne offered little by way of overnight accommodation. It was only with the advent of tourism midway through that century that the local council approved measures with the intention of exploiting the potential of the town's setting and scenery. The northern shoreline of the lake – now graced by the promenade and large hotels – was originally marshland. Work on reclaiming the area between the town and the Hof Church (the Church of St. Leodegar) began in 1836, followed by the building of the Schweizerhofquai promenade. This allowed the old Hofbrücke Bridge, needed for crossing the marshland, to be done away with. The long-established Lucerne-based von Segesser von Brunegg family recognised the sign of the times; 1845 saw the brothers Eduard, Placidus and Xaver von Segesser von Brunegg establish the town's first hotel, the Schweizerhof, which they situated by the lake specifically to take advantage of the fine views. The nascent railway arrived in Lucerne in 1859, thus signalling the start of a boom in foreign visitors from the upper social classes. The need for more accommodation for these well-heeled travellers soon became apparent. The von Segessers sold the Schweizerhof together with the adjacent hotel erected in 1865, the Luzernerhof, and founded the construction company Segesser & Cie in partnership with Eduard von Segesser's son-in-law Alphons Maximilian Pfyffer von Altishofen (otherwise known as Max Alphons Pfyffer); they acquired land in the outlying Unteren Halde district of Lucerne. The stipulations of the local authority were clear: a hotel palace had to be erected by 1870 capable of boosting Lucerne's standing in the burgeoning competition between tourist resorts. The dimensions of the project under consideration went beyond anything built to date: 84 metres in length and 27 metres high, i.e. half of today's volume

=== Opening, Ritz era, expansions ===
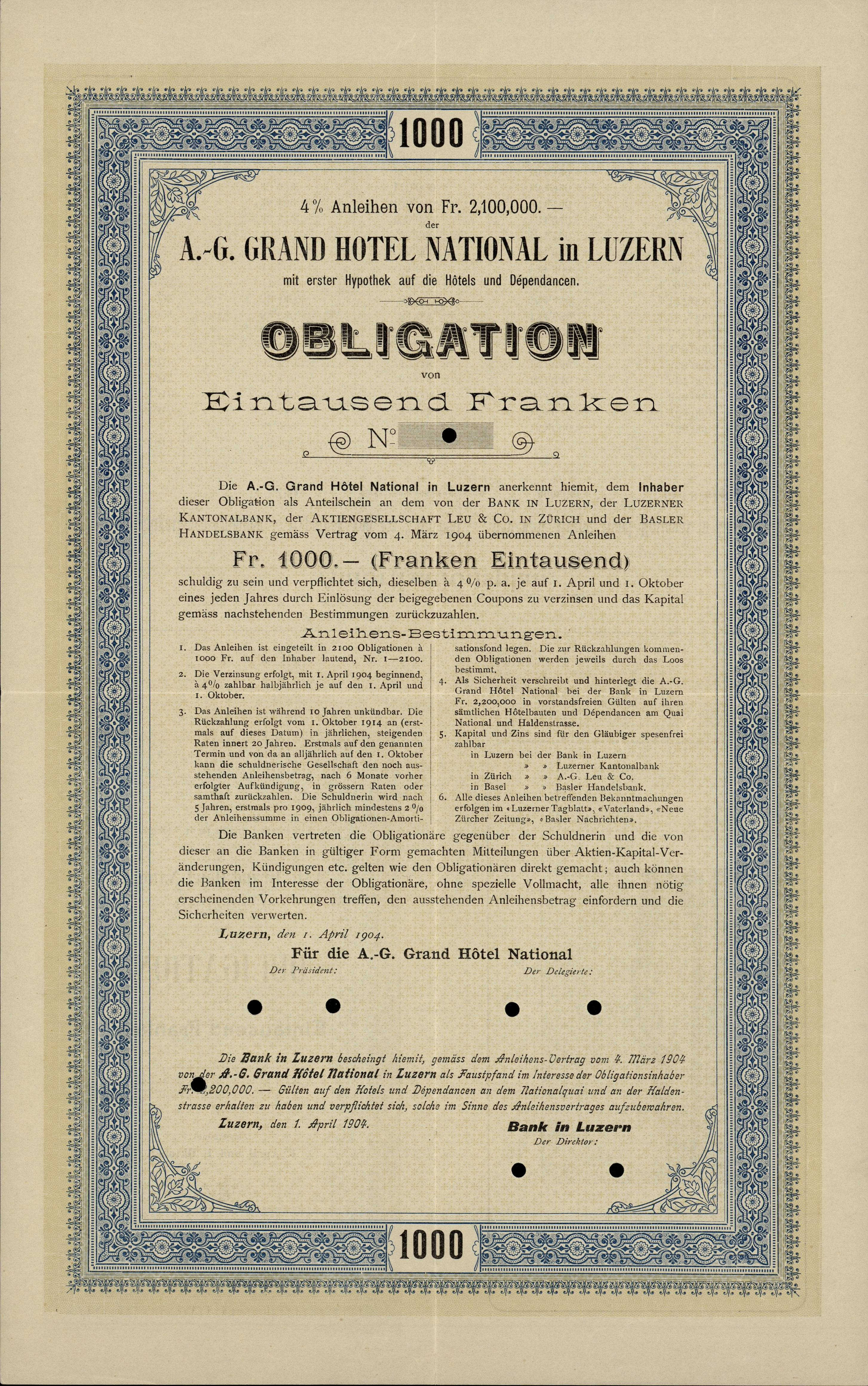
Bond of the Grand Hotel National in Lucerne, issued 1. April 1904

Following two years or so of construction work, the Hôtel National was completed in time for the start of the 1870 season – only to be thwarted in its hopes for a glittering opening season by the looming Franco-Prussian War: foreign tourism collapsed. It was only after the war ended shortly before the 1871 summer season that the hotel was able to commence operations in earnest under its first director, Max Alphons Pfyffer. The lingering economic depression in Europe had the National facing a challenging environment; the time had arrived for a change of management. César Ritz, founder of the hotel dynasty, took over the running of the National at the end of the 1870s. He increased its comfort, perfected the service and landed a coup in 1881 by hiring an executive chef who was already a legend: Auguste Escoffier. The hotel could at last flourish. Ritz led the National until 1890, when he was succeeded by A. M. Pfyffer's sons Alphons and Hans Pfyffer. To coincide with the change at the helm, the establishment's legal form was altered: formerly a limited partnership, it became a public limited company by the name of Grand Hotel National AG, with César Ritz on the board of directors. Tourism in the meantime had been put on a more professional footing, tourist boards were being established and international networks forged: at the time, Lucerne was still regarded purely as a summer destination, and the clientele travelled further south for the winter. The newly established tourist board published its first figures: in 1892 78,000 visitors took advantage of overnight accommodation offered by the town's hotels and guest houses, a figure rising to almost 140,000 in 1900. The Grand Hôtel National (as it was now called) found itself running short of space, so the decision was made to expand: 1897 saw the opening of the dining room annexe on the east side, while what used to be the dining room became the ballroom. This signalled the start of a series of expansions and refurbishments: a large annexe, the Nationalhof, was conceived as a heated winter house, which, for the first time, allowed the hotel to remain open all year round. The wing was opened in 1900, and the year-round opening did much to enhance the hotel's prestige. Also for the first time, "apartments" were created – as suites, they became standard fare in all luxury hotels. The third expansion in 1910 involved adding a floor to the intermediate wing linking the Grand Hôtel with the Nationalhof.

=== Belle Époque, World Wars ===
The Belle Époque saw Lucerne consolidate its reputation as a tourist destination, with up to 190,000 travellers a year visiting the town of just 35,000 inhabitants. The National was on course for success; the investments were proving their worth. When the First World War broke out, however, visitor numbers plummeted and a number of staff were called up for war service; only once the war was over did matters improve. On 22 August 1920 the hotel played host to a historic event: the Italian Prime Minister Giovanni Giolitti and his British counterpart David Lloyd George met here to implement the terms of the Versailles Peace Treaty. Tourism flourished, with visitor numbers by 1923 exceeding those before the War. The Great Depression, however, was to bring the recovery to a sudden end. Tourism recovered only after the Second World War, although it was now much altered in nature: travelling had become considerably cheaper, and the car led to an additional democratisation of tourism – increasing numbers of motorists saw Lucerne not as a destination, but as a staging post. In 1954 Hans F. Elmiger, a grandson of M. A. Pfyffer and nephew of Hans Pfyffer, was appointed director of the hotel, where bed numbers had been reduced from 405 to 300. It underwent a thoroughgoing refurbishment in 1957/58, which also involved "purifying" the facade and removing the neo-baroque sandstone ornamentation.

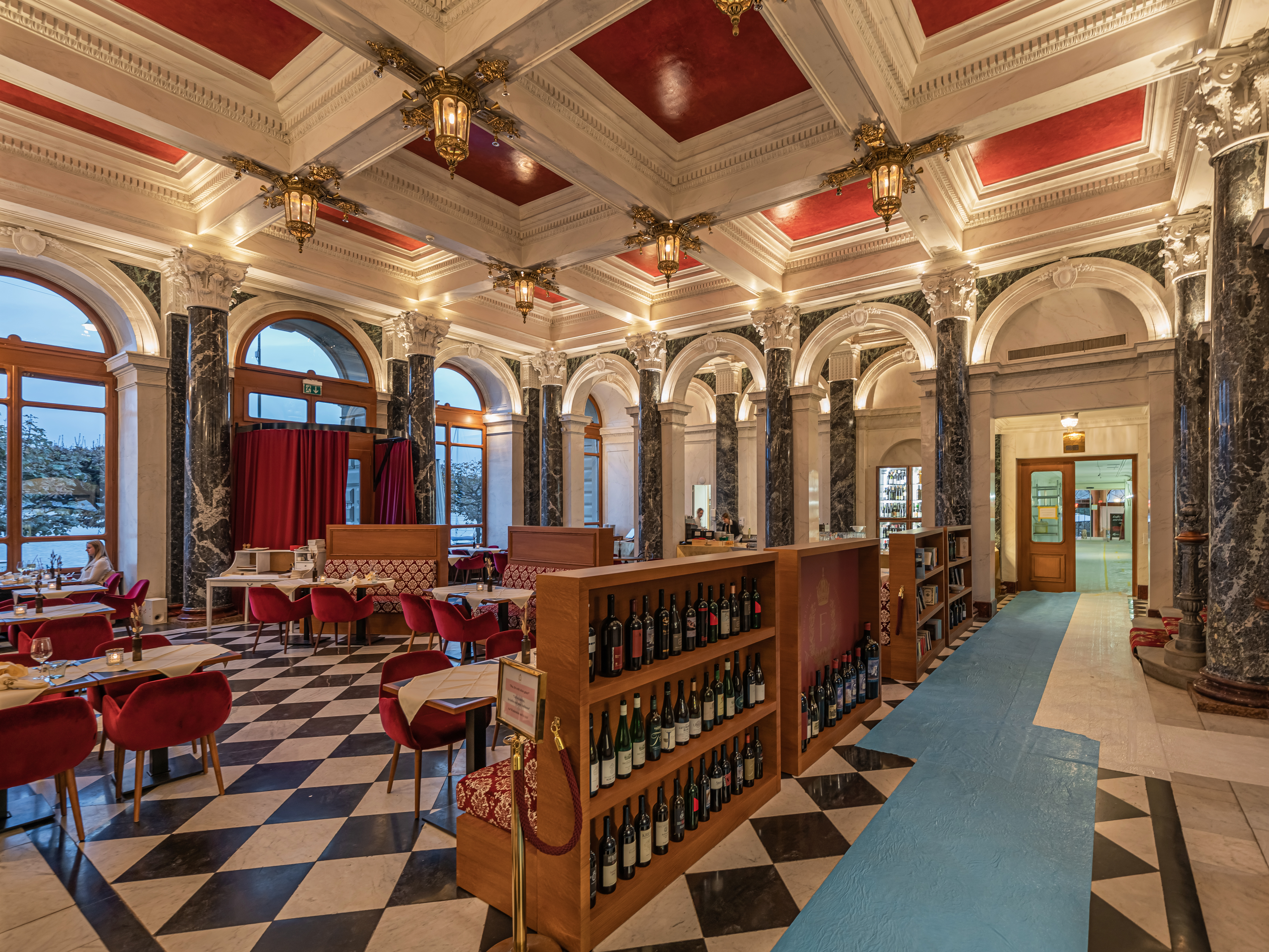
Grand Hotel National, interior view

=== Umberto Erculiani era ===
The early 1970s found the former palace in dire economic straits, with rumours circulating the town suggesting that the hotel might make way for a shopping mall. Cue the appearance of the architect Umberto Erculiani. He acquired the shares of the Grand Hotel National AG and presented a multiple use concept for the complex: shops and restaurants would be open to the public, there would be less emphasis on hospitality, and some of the premises would be let as office space.^{[2]} At the same time, "residence suite" tenancies would attract a new, well-heeled customer segment. The western, and oldest, wing of the building was refurbished in 1977 and two restaurants integrated into it. The ground floor now featured an end-to-end passage open to the general public. In addition, the neighbouring building received two nightclubs. The hotel entrance was relocated, the eastern part expanded and transformed into a hotel wing, and an indoor swimming pool added. Ensuing years saw the residences built in the western part as suites for extended or permanent stays. The hotel operations were subjected to further pruning in 2001: the hotel in the east wing was henceforth to acquire a 5-star rating, while the west wing continues to host the residence suites.

== Present ==
In autumn 2015 the Grand Hotel National was offering 41 rooms and suites in the hotel wing, plus 22 residence suites for longer-term and permanent stays. The entire length of the ground floor is accessible to the public and features four restaurants (the National, the 1871, the Il Padrino, and the Jialu National), plus a café and a bar.

== Literature ==
1. • Sibylle Birrer: Grand Hotel National – Luxus und Gastlichkeit von 1870 bis heute. Hier und Jetzt Verlag, ISBN 978-3-03919-169-7.

== Itemisation ==
1. A-rated assets in Canton Lucerne Inventory of cultural assets of national importance (PDF, 247 kB)
2. Neustart für das «National» in Luzern, NZZ, 4 June 2003
