= Zentral- und Hochschulbibliothek Luzern =

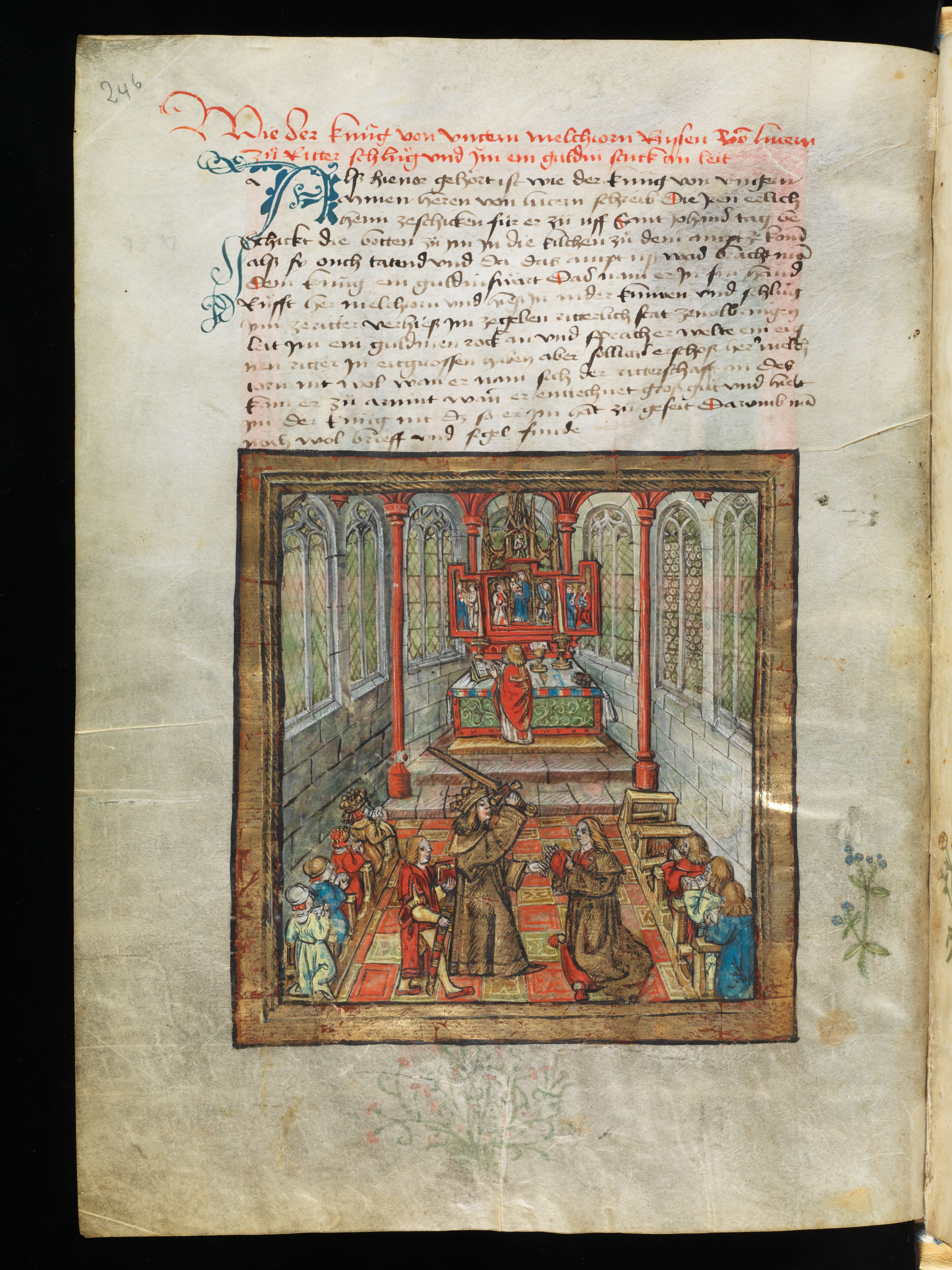
- 47°02′54″N 8°18′26″E
- Location: Lucerne, Switzerland

Other information
- Website: Official website

Zentral- und Hochschulbibliothek Luzern (English: Lucerne Central and University Library), the largest library of Central Switzerland, is a cantonal library for the general and academic public in Lucerne.
