= César Ritz =

Swiss hotelier (1850–1918)

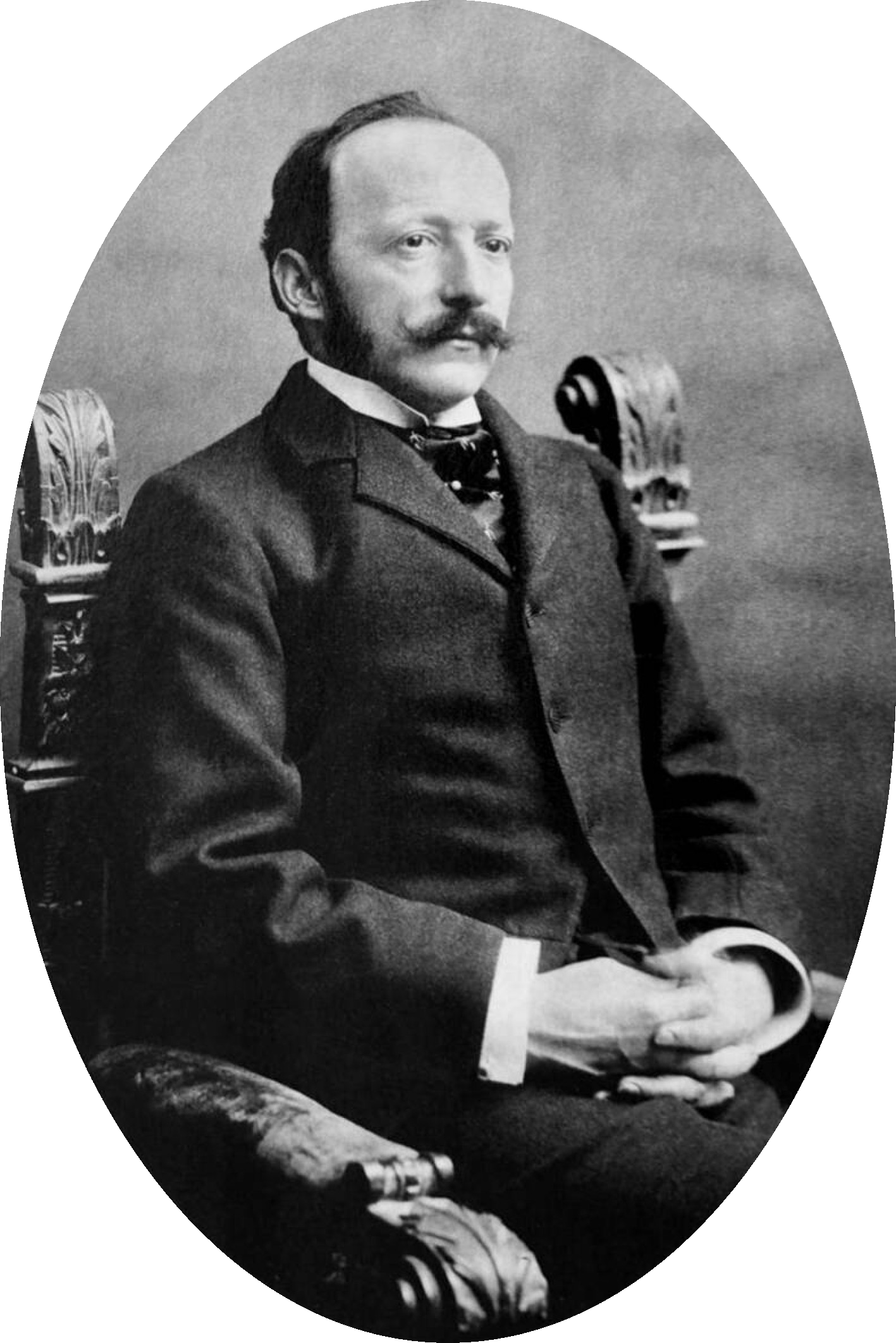
- Ritz in 1897
- Born: Cäsar Ritz; 23 February 1850; Niederwald, Valais, Switzerland
- Died: 26 October 1918 (aged 68); Küssnacht, Canton of Schwyz, Switzerland
- Resting place: Niederwald
- Occupation: Hotelier
- Spouse: Marie-Louise Beck
- Children: Charles Ritz

César Ritz (French: [sezaʁ ʁits]; born Cäsar Ritz; 23 February 1850 – 26 October 1918) was a Swiss businessman, hotelier and pioneer of the travel industry. He most notably founded several hotels most famously the Hôtel Ritz in Paris and the Ritz and Carlton Hotels in London (the forerunners of the modern Ritz-Carlton Hotel Company).

He was an early hotel chain founder known as "King of Hoteliers, and Hotelier to Kings," and it is from his name and that of his hotels that the term ritzy derives.

== Early life and education ==
Ritz was born 23 February 1850 in Niederwald in Valais, Switzerland, the youngest of thirteen children, to Johann "Anton" Ritz, a farmer, municipal president and justice of the peace, and Maria Creszentia (née Heinen), into a Catholic peasant family.

At the age of twelve he was sent as a boarder to the Jesuit college at Sion, and at fifteen, having shown only vaguely artistic leanings, was apprenticed as a sommelier at a hotel in Brig. While working there as an apprentice wine waiter he was dismissed by the patron of the hotel from his position, saying, "You'll never make anything of yourself in the hotel business. It takes a special knack, a special flair, and it's only right that I tell you the truth—you haven't got it." He returned briefly to the Jesuits as a sacristan, then left to seek his fortune in Paris at the time of the 1867 Universal Exhibition.

== Early career ==
Ritz's formative five years in Paris, including the siege of 1870–71 during the Franco-Prussian War, gave him sufficient polish and confidence to transform himself from a waiter and general factotum into a maître d'hôtel, manager, and eventually hotelier. After a short stint working at the Hôtel de la Fidélité, he worked as a waiter in a workman's bistro and took a position in a prix fixe restaurant owned by the Chevallier family, where he was later dismissed for breaking too many dishes in his desire to work briskly. He worked his way up from assistant waiter to restaurant manager of a restaurant on the corner of Rue Royale and Rue Saint-Honoré, before working at the high-class Restaurant Voisin between 1869 and 1872. Here he waited on the likes of Sarah Bernhardt, George Sand, Edmond de Goncourt, Théophile Gautier, and Alexandre Dumas, learned the essentials of his trade from the owner, Bellenger, and served up dishes such as elephant's trunk in sauce chasseur as supplies of fresh meat dwindled during the siege and zoo animals took their place.

In 1872, Ritz became floor waiter of the Hôtel Splendide in Paris, which was one of the most lavish hotels in Europe at the time, where he met many rich, self-made Americans as guests who had a profound effect on him. In 1873 he was a waiter in Vienna at the time of the World's Fair, by which time he had begun to acquire a considerable knowledge of the industry and the culinary preferences of esteemed people such as the Prince of Wales.

== First managership ==
In the winter of 1873 his career in hotel management began when he undertook the direction of the restaurant at the Grand Hôtel in Nice. He once stated that his "years of wandering in the wake of a migratory society had begun". While working as manager at the Rigi Kulm Hotel in Switzerland, an incident occurred that changed his career. The central heating at the hotel broke during a frigid day, and a group of 40 were arriving for lunch. Ritz changed the menu to hot dishes, moved a table into the smaller drawing room, and heated 40 bricks in the oven to be wrapped in flannel cloths placed at the footstool of each guest. This quick thinking was noticed by Max Pfyffer, the designer of the Grand Hotel National in Lucerne, who noted his efficiency in a scrapbook.

Regular moves then followed, usually twice a year just ahead of the migration of the international tourist set from the hotels of Nice or San Remo in winter to Swiss mountain resorts such as Rigi-Kulm and Lucerne in summer. He had a period working as the maître d'hôtel of the Grand Hôtel in Locarno on Lake Maggiore, a difficult period given the eccentricities of its alcoholic manager who lived on a diet of raw ham, bread, and wine and had a habit of disturbing the guests, ringing bells at 5 a.m. and chasing his wife through the corridors with an army pistol. Ritz meekly commented that "I did what I could to pacify the clients" in the circumstances.

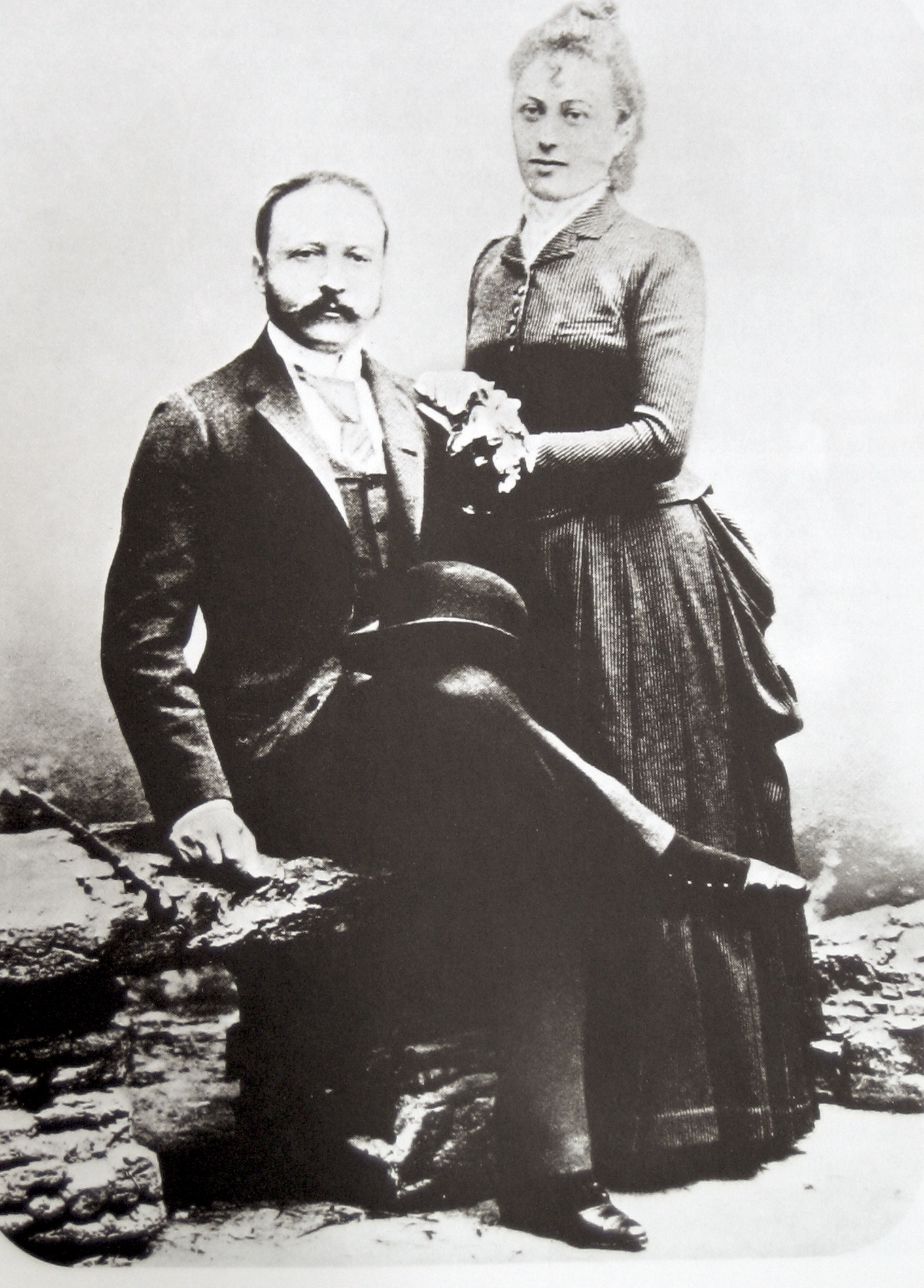
Ritz with wife Marie-Louise in 1888. They had two sons.

In 1878, he became the manager of the Grand Hôtel National in Lucerne and held the same position, in parallel, at the Grand Hôtel in Monaco until 1888. A pioneer in the development and management of luxury hotels, he knew how to entice wealthy customers and quickly gained a reputation for good taste and elegance, and by the mid-1880s the Grand Hôtel National in Lucerne had earned a reputation as the most elegant hotel in Europe. Ritz was the first to mandate that "the customer is always right". His code was "See all without looking; hear all without listening; be attentive without being servile; anticipate without being presumptuous. If a diner complains about a dish or the wine, immediately remove it and replace it, no questions asked."

According to his widow, Ritz also was a pioneer of hygiene and cleanliness in his hotels. He decorated without heavy draperies and wallpaper and replaced them with washable paint and lighter washable fabrics. In 1887 Ritz bought the Hôtel de Provence in Cannes and the Restaurant de la Conversation and Minerva Hotel in Baden-Baden.

== Ritz and Escoffier ==
In 1888, he opened the Conversations Haus restaurant with Auguste Escoffier as chef in Baden-Baden, and the two were then invited to London by Richard D'Oyly Carte to become the first manager and chef of the Savoy Hotel, positions they held from 1889 until 1897. Ritz put together what he described as "a little army of hotel men for the conquest of London". The Savoy under Ritz was an immediate success, attracting a distinguished and moneyed clientele headed by the Prince of Wales, including the British and European royal families.

According to Montgomery-Massingberd and Watkin, "the outstanding success of the Savoy owed everything to the civilized genius of César Ritz and his brilliant chef, Auguste Escoffier, who introduced the English to the subtlety and delicacy of French haute cuisine and invented at the Savoy many celebrated dishes, including Pêche Melba and the thin toast named after the same singer". Aristocratic women, hitherto unaccustomed to dine in public, were now "seen in full regalia in the Savoy dining and supper rooms."

Ritz campaigned with Henry Labouchère, Lord Randolph Churchill, and others to "alter licensing laws whereby restaurants could not open on Sundays and had to close at 11pm on other nights." In March 1898, Ritz was sacked from the Savoy for fraud. He was implicated in the disappearance of more than £3,400 of wine and spirits, as well as in receiving kickbacks from suppliers. In a 1938 biography of her husband, Ritz's widow maintained that he resigned. According to a damning report by the Savoy's auditors, Carte handed Ritz, Escoffier and Louis Echenard (Ritz' deputy) letters of dismissal.

Ritz threatened to sue the hotel company for wrongful dismissal but was evidently dissuaded by Escoffier, who felt that their interests would be better served by keeping the scandal quiet. Lady de Grey sided with Ritz; she cancelled her party at the Savoy on learning of his sacking, stating "Where Ritz goes, I go". Ritz subsequently established a Carlton Hotel in Haymarket, built in 1897–99 under the designs of C.J. Phipps. Bombed in World War II, the hotel was later replaced by New Zealand House in 1959.

== Ritz hotels ==
Ritz would go on to find investors and open a number of his own hotels. By the late 1890s, Ritz was an extremely busy man, with hotel enterprises in Rome, Frankfurt, Salsomaggiore, Palermo, Biarritz, Wiesbaden, Monte Carlo, Lucerne and Menton and projects in Madrid, Cairo and Johannesburg. According to his wife, "César's suitcases were never completely unpacked; he was always either just arriving from or departing upon a new journey".

In 1896, he formed the Ritz Hotel syndicate with South African millionaire Alfred Beit, reputedly the wealthiest man in the world at the time. They opened what would become the celebrated Hôtel Ritz in the Place Vendôme, Paris, late in 1898. At the inauguration, on 1 June 1898, were many figures of the European elite, including Lady de Grey, the Duke and Duchess de Rohan, Calouste Gulbenkian, and Marcel Proust. He went on to open the Ritz Hotel in London in 1906, which became one of the most popular meeting places of the era for the rich and famous. The Ritz Hotel in Madrid opened in 1910, inspired by King Alfonso XIII's desire to build a luxury hotel to rival the Ritz in Paris. Ritz enjoyed a long partnership with Auguste Escoffier, the now-famous French chef and father of modern French cooking. The partnership lasted until Ritz had to retire in 1907 because of deteriorating health.

== Later life ==
The hotelier himself withdrew progressively from the affairs of his various companies, selling his interests in hotels at Frankfurt and Salsomaggiore in 1905 and retiring from the Ritz Hotel Development Company in 1907, from the Carlton Hotel Company in 1908, and from the Paris Ritz Company in 1911.

By 1912, according to Marie-Louise Ritz, to all intents and purposes his life had finished. In 1913, he was placed in a private hospital at Lausanne, and the following year he was moved to another on Lake Küssnacht in Canton Schwyz. He died at Küssnacht on 26 October 1918. Although from a humble Swiss background, César Ritz and his luxurious hotels became legendary, and his name entered the English language as an epitome of high-class cuisine and accommodation. He is buried in the village of his birth.
