= Alphons Maximilian Pfyffer von Altishofen =

Swiss architect and hotel manager (1834–1890)

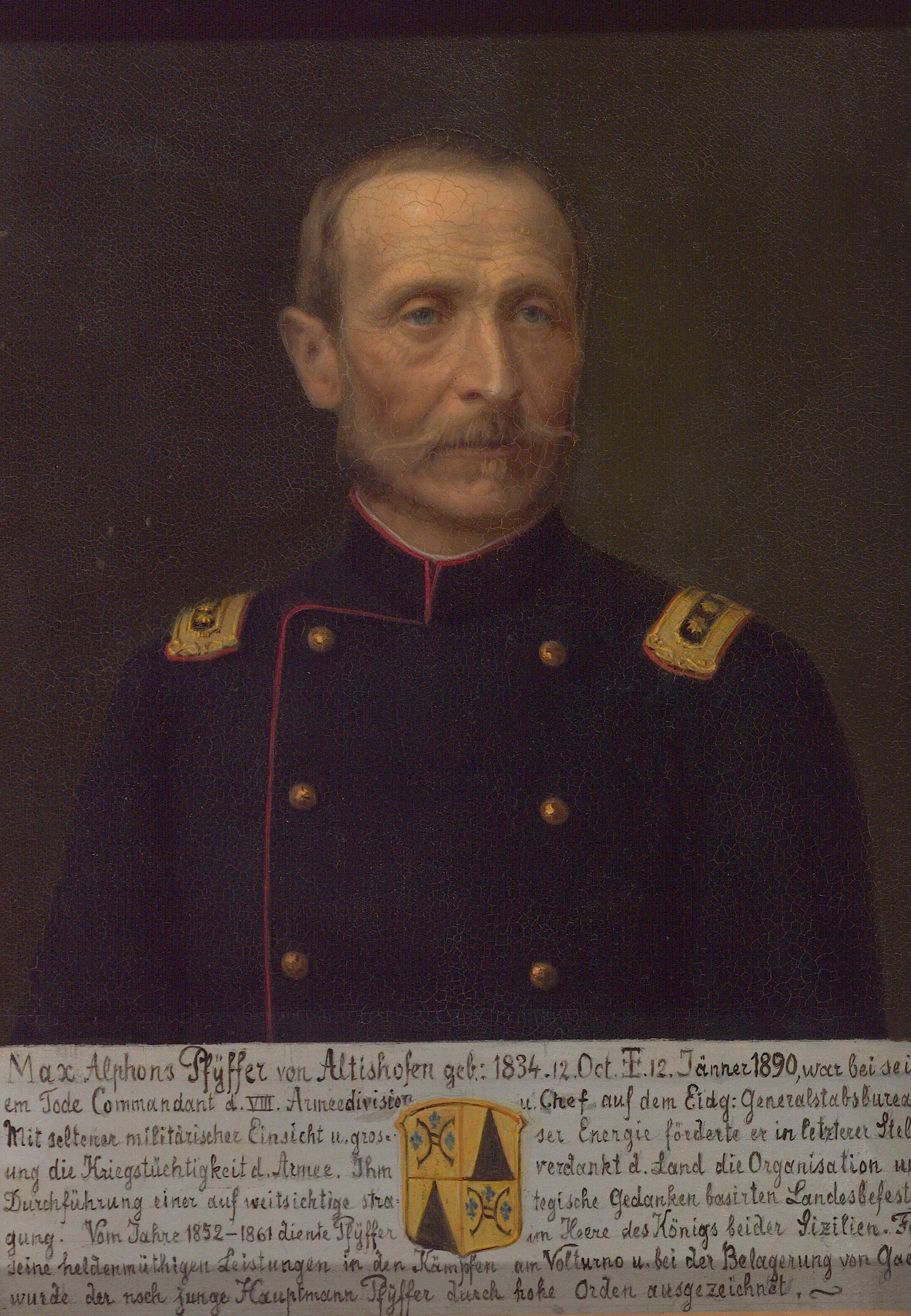
Portrait in the Lucerne Central and University Library

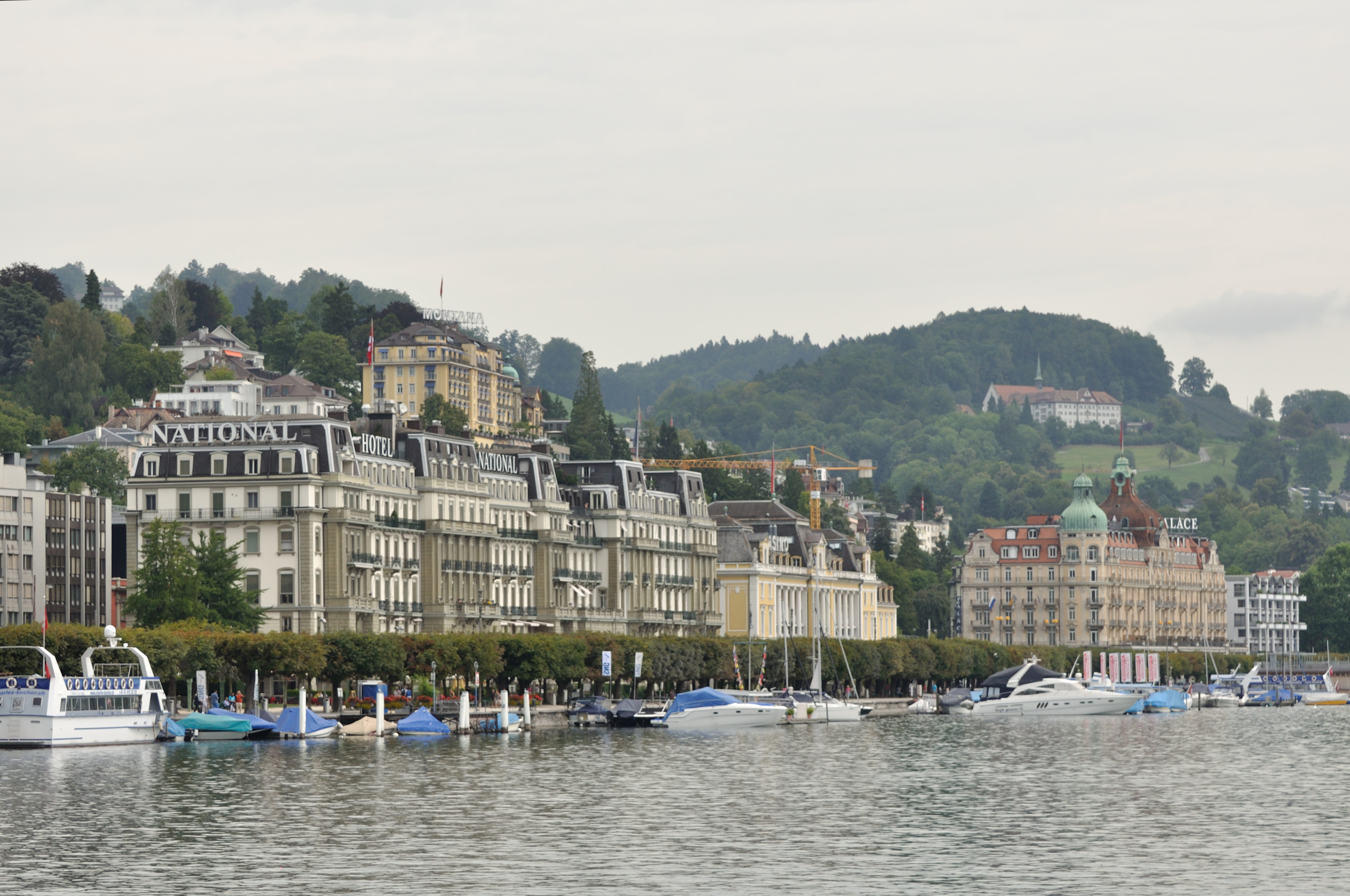
Grand National Hotel

Alphons Maximilian Pfyffer von Altishofen, better known as Max Alphons Pfyffer von Altishofen (12 October 1834 – 12 January 1890), was a Swiss architect, hotelier and military officer. He built the Grand Hotel National, which his father-in-law owned, and hired César Ritz to manage it. His son Hans Pfyffer took over management of the hotel in 1890 after Ritz had left Lucerne for London to manage the Savoy Hotel.

== Early life ==
A member of the Pfyffer family, Max Alphons Pfyffer von Altishofen was born on 12 October 1834 in Altishofen, in the canton of Lucerne, to Heinrich Pfyffer von Altishofen, the last lord of Altishofen, and Theresia von Moos. He was the brother of the politician Ludwig Pfyffer von Altishofen. From 1846 onwards, Pfyffer grew up in Augsburg and Munich, where he later studied architecture.

== Military career ==
Between 1852 and 1861, Pfyffer served as a mercenary in the army of the Kingdom of the Two Sicilies. He took part in the 1860–1861 Siege of Gaeta during the wars of Italian Unification. Upon his return to Switzerland, Pfyffer joined the General Staff of the Swiss Armed Forces as a captain in 1861. He was promoted to colonel in 1875, to divisionary in 1877, and served as Chief of the General Staff from 1883 until 1890.

Under Pfyffer's leadership, national fortification plans were developed, including the fortifications in the Gotthard Pass (initiated in 1886). His work in the General Staff established him as a pioneer of the National Redoubt concept. Pfyffer also supported the training of members of the general staff, prepared mobilization plans, organized the territorial service, created the bicycle troops and introduced optical signaling in the Swiss military.

== Professional and business activities ==
After returning from Italy, Pfyffer operated a mechanical workshop with his brothers, practiced as an architect and managed the Hotel National along with Josef Franz Lorenz Segesser von Brunegg's son. He participated in the development of major Lucerne landmarks; Pfyffer built the Hotel Luzernerhof for his father-in-law in 1864 and designed the interior of the Grand Hotel National in Lucerne, which he subsequently co-managed, from 1868 to 1870. In 1878, he appointed César Ritz to manage the hotel, a position Ritz held until 1890.

== Personal life ==
Pfyffer was a moderate conservative in politics. In 1862, he married "Mathilde" Barbara Georgina Segesser von Brunegg (1842–1903), a daughter of Eduard Segesser von Brunegg (1811–1868) and Anna Maria Segesser von Brunegg (née von Vivis; 1817–1904), both from the patriciate. They had six children;

- Alphons-Heinrich Pfyffer von Altishofen (1863–1929), married Eugenia Coraggioni d'Orelli (1865–1952); five children.
- Maria "Mathilde" Adelheid Georgia Pfyffer von Altishofen (1864–1933), married Emil Pestalozzi, a medical doctor; no children.
- Hans Pfyffer von Altishofen (1866–1953), married Josephine Reichmann; one son.
- "Georgine" Mathilde Johanna Pfyffer von Altishofen (1868–1936), married Julius Franz Georg Elmiger (1861–1934); eight children.
- Mathilde Maria Theresia Pfyffer von Altishofen (1870–1943), never married
- Heinrich Hektor "Robert" Pfyffer von Altishofen (1873–1938), married firstly to Helene von Kiezopolska, secondly to Alice von Heller (1871–1939).

Pfyffer was a recipient of the Order of Saint George of the Reunion and the Royal Order of Francis I. He died on 12 January 1890 in Lucerne, aged 55.

== Selected works ==
- Luzernerhof Hotel, Lucerne, 1864–65
- Plan for an avenue to the Lion Monument, Lucerne 1865
- Project for a museum on the alpine road in 1866
- Hotel National, Lucerne
- Plans for the Kursaal, Lucerne. 1868
- Plans for the Gotthard fortress, concept design, design from 1886
