= Church of St. Leodegar (Lucerne) =

Church in Lucerne, Switzerland

Coordinates: 47.0557°N 8.31405°E

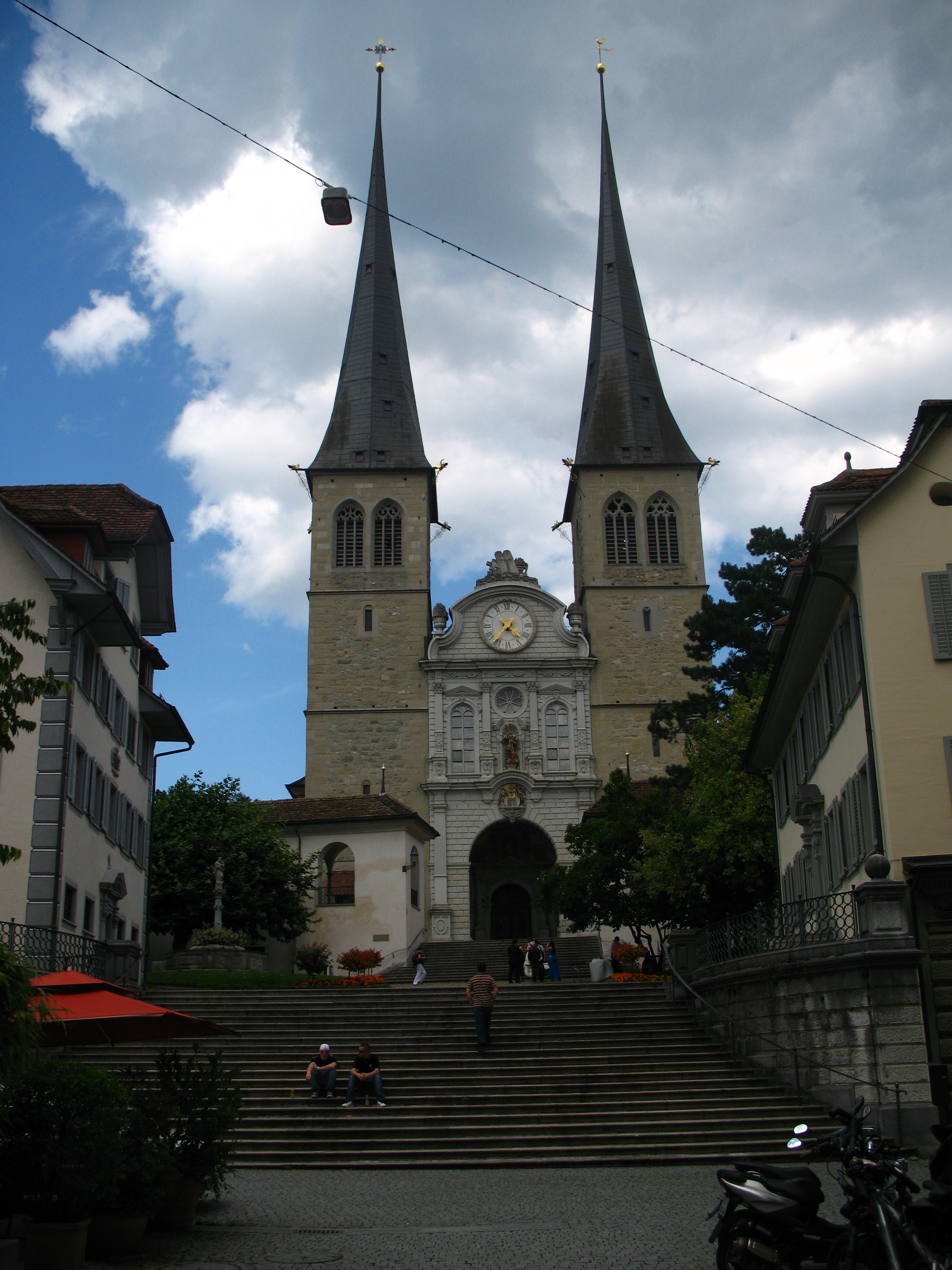
St. Leodegar im Hof

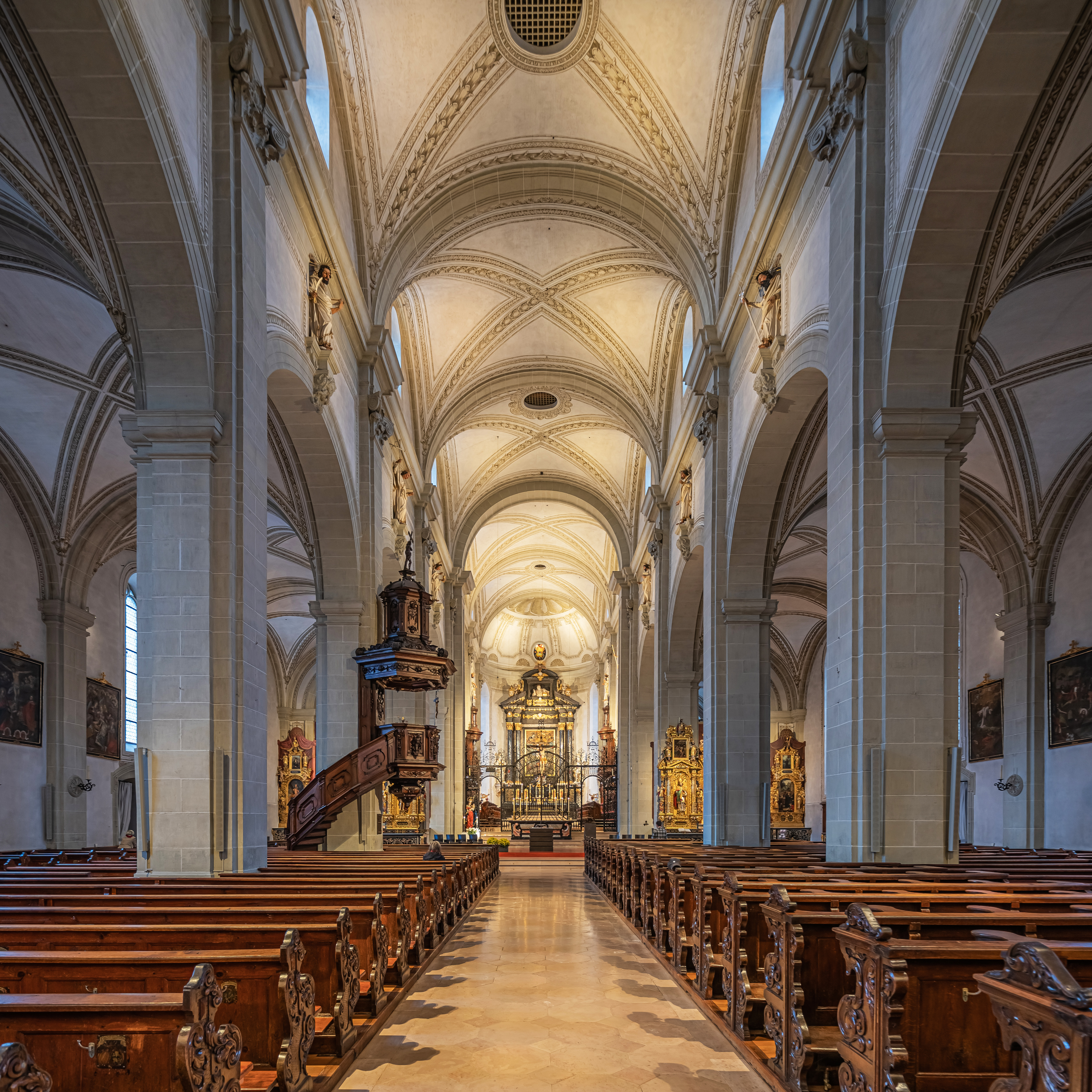

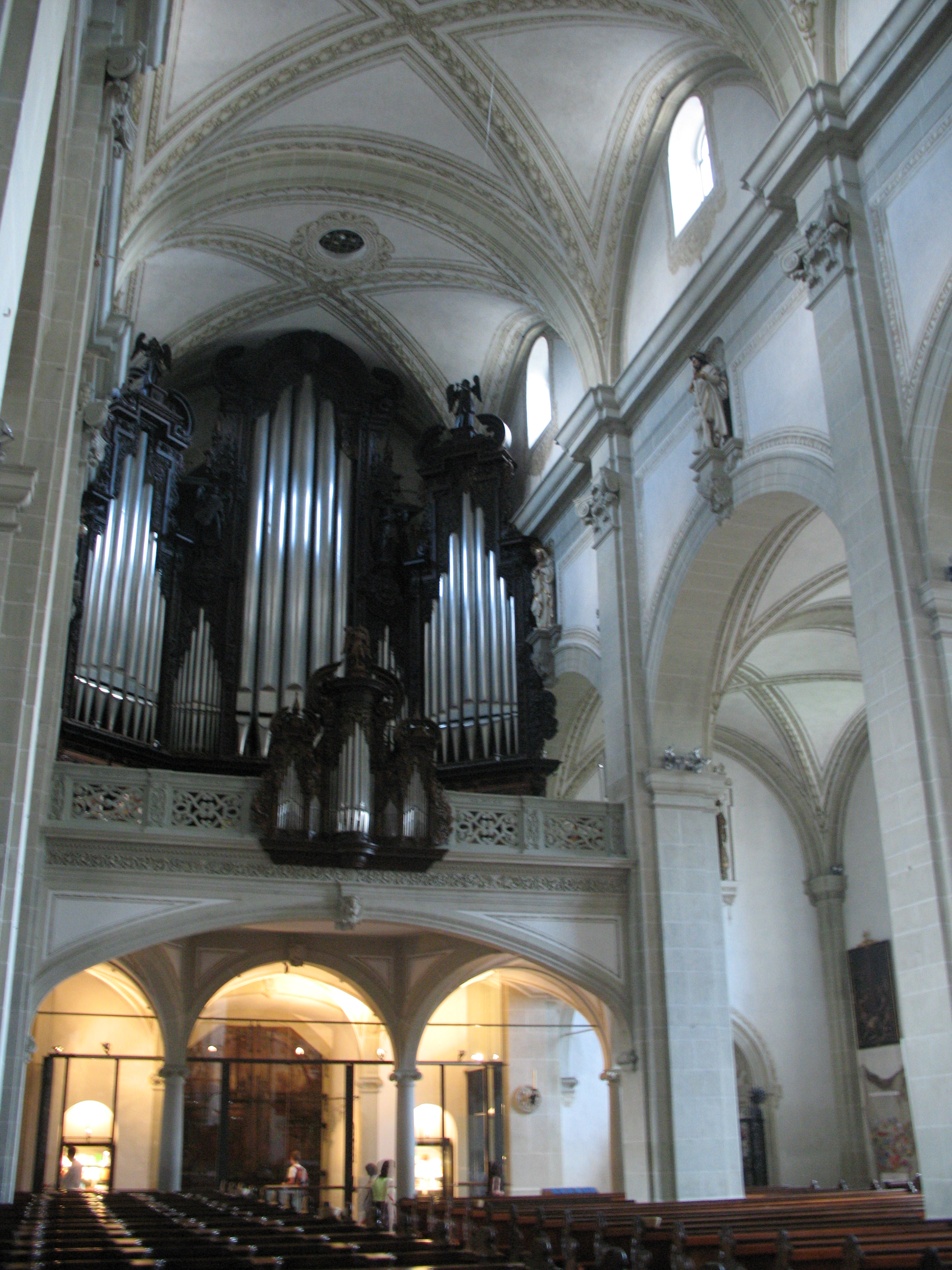

The Church of St. Leodegar (German: St. Leodegar im Hof or Hofkirche St. Leodegar) is a Roman Catholic church in the city of Lucerne, Switzerland. It was built in parts from 1633 to 1639 on the foundation of the Roman basilica, begun in 735, which had burnt in 1633. This church was one of the few built north of the Alps during the Thirty Years War and one of the largest art history rich churches of the German late renaissance period.

== History ==
In the 8th century there was already an abbey consecrated to Saint Maurice on the current site of the church, which had been donated by Pepin the Short, and was known at the time as the Monastarium Luciaria. By the 12th century the abbey was under the jurisdiction of the Murbach Abbey, whose patron saint was St. Leodegar.

In 1291 the abbey was sold to the Habsburgs. In 1433 the city of Lucerne, now a member of the Eidgenossenschaft, took control of the abbey, and in 1455 it was converted from Benedictine to a “universal order” church.

The monastery experienced a heyday during the time of the reformation due to Luzern being a prominent city for the Swiss Catholic cantons. The papal nuncio, resident in Luzern, used the church as his cathedral during this time.

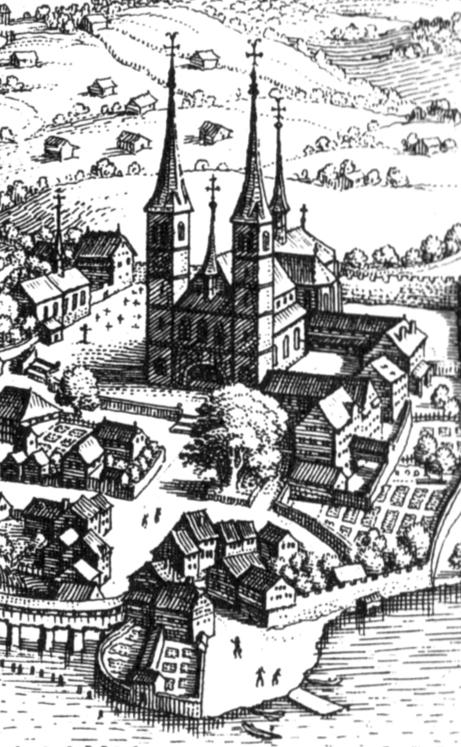
The church as it looked prior to the 1633 fire.

In 1874 the parish church of St. Leodegar was founded and with that the church became simultaneously a monastery church and parish church, as it is today.

== Sources ==
- Lothar Emmanuel Kaiser: St. Leodegar im Hof, 2003, ISBN 3-89870-132-8
