= February flood of 1825 =

Storm surge flood on the North Sea coast of Germany and the Netherlands

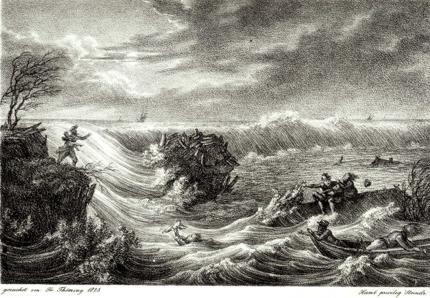
Contemporary depiction of a dyke breaking in the mouth of the river Elbe

A devastating flood occurred from 3 to 5 February 1825 on the North Sea coast in which about 800 people were drowned. The flood devastated farmland in the region, causing an economic crisis.

Particularly affected was the North Sea coast of Jutland, Slesvig and Germany. The sand spit Agger Tange was broken through, and the Limfjord got its western opening to the sea. Henceforth, North Jutland has been an island.

In North Frisia, the unprotected islets, known as Halligen, were hit. Many dykes had already been damaged in November the year before by a severe storm surge. The island of Pellworm was completely flooded.

In East Frisia, the town of Emden was particularly hard hit. However, because the levees in the East Frisian area had been raised significantly in many places in the preceding years, the number of casualties, about 200, was smaller than it might have otherwise been.

In the Netherlands, the February flood was the worst natural disaster of the 19th century. Most of the dead and the worst damage occurred in Groningen, Friesland and Overijssel. The reaction at national level was quite similar to that during the Flood of 1953, but the former event was surprisingly quickly forgotten once the damage had been repaired and had no political or engineering consequences. The disaster of 1953 finally allowed a law on Delta Works to be passed for a significant improvement of coastal protection.

The flood has been recorded in the Diary of Jan Kruys, by the first Mayor of the town of Vriezenveen, Overijssel (1767–1830):

"The 4th and 5th of this month have been disastrous for numerous residents of this province, as well as many others abroad. People and cattle have drowned, especially in the towns around the South Sea, like Elburg, Kampen, Mastenbroek etc. The government has taken measures to support the victims."

The Groningen epidemic of 1826, probably caused by a rare outbreak of malaria tropica, was partly the result of the extensive floods and has also been described by Jan Kruys in his diary.
