= W. J. Kruys =

Dutch vice admiral (1906–1985)

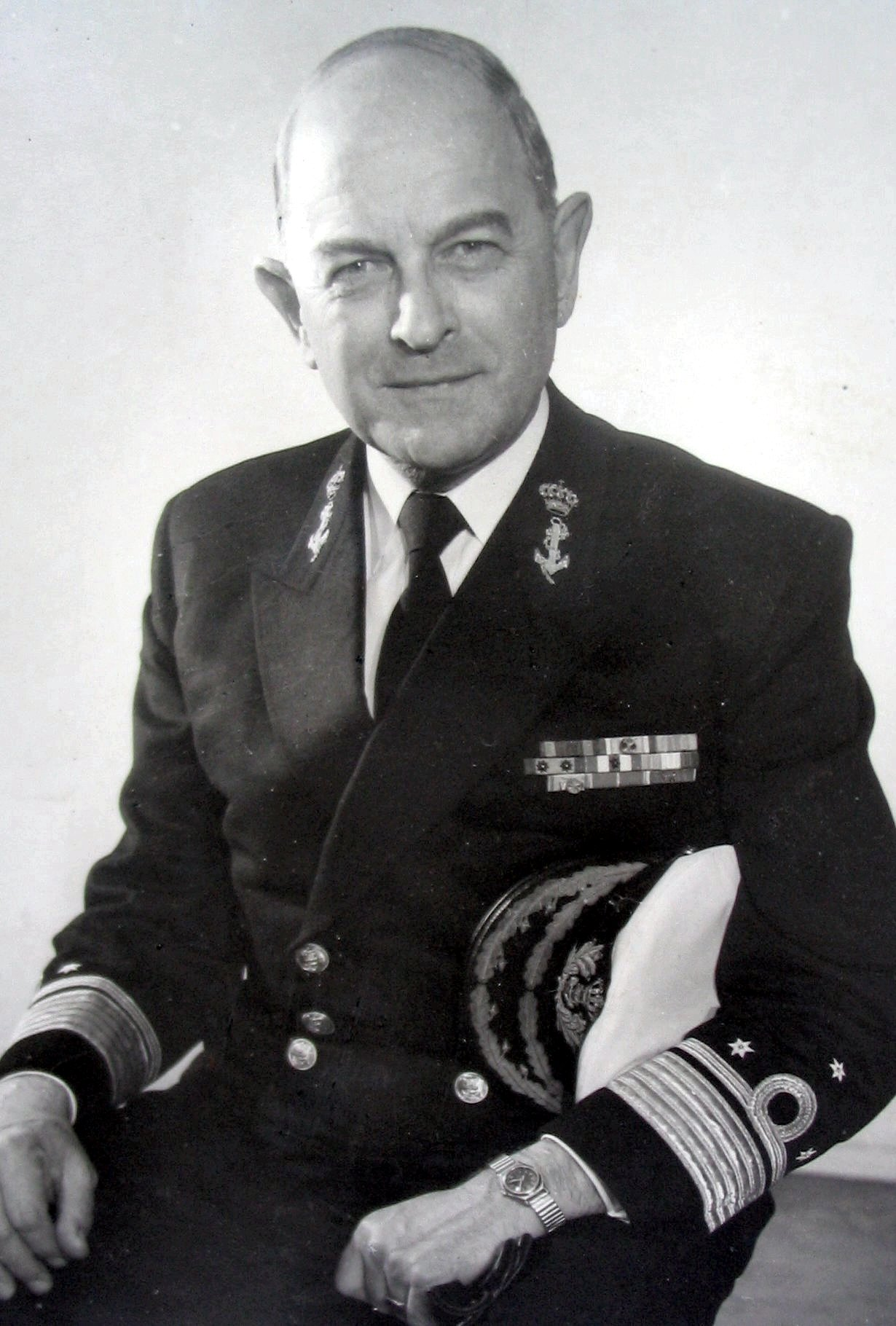
- Vice admiral Willem Jan Kruys
- Born: Willem Jan Kruys; 13 January 1906; Pangkalan Brandan (Sumatra)
- Died: 20 April 1985 (aged 79); Bilthoven (The Netherlands)
- Military career
- Branch: Royal Netherlands Navy
- Service years: 1924–1960
- Rank: Vice-admiral
- Conflicts: World War II
- Awards: Knight of the Order of the Netherlands Lion Commander of the Order of Orange-Nassau; Expedition Cross with clasp for Timor 1942; War Commemorative Cross 1940-1945; Decoration for Order and Peace; Legion of Merit Order of the British Empire

Willem Jan Kruys (1906–1985) was a vice admiral in the Royal Netherlands Navy and later director-general of the Dutch National Aviation Authority (Dutch: Rijksluchtvaartdienst).

== Early life ==
Willem Jan Kruys was a member of a well-known Dutch Navy family. He was born on 13 January 1906 in Pangkalan Brandan (Sumatra). His father Gerhardus Kruys (1876–1955) worked for the ‘Batavian Oil Company' in the Dutch East Indies. His mother, Judith Elizabeth de Bruyne (1883–1937), was a daughter of Navy Officer captain Willem Jan de Bruyne. His brother Gerhardus Kruys (1907–1982) was also a captain in the Royal Netherlands Navy.

Willem Jan was a grandson of Dutch Minister of Navy and vice admiral Gerhardus Kruys (1838–1902), and a nephew of vice admiral Theodoor Louis Kruys (1884–1940). His great-great grandfather was Jan Kruys (1767-1830), the first Mayor of the town Vriezenveen in Overijssel. Willem Jan spent his childhood in the Dutch East Indies. In 1920 the family returned to the Netherlands. Willem Jan finished his high school education in Deventer.

== Early Navy career ==
In 1924 Willem Jan began his Navy career as naval cadet at the Royal Naval Institute in Den Helder, where he was a member of the senate in 1925. One of his passions was ocean sailing. On 16 August 1927 he was appointed midshipman, and on 16 August 1929, he became sub lieutenant.

On 20 August 1935 he married Anna Troll (1911–1998) by proxy. She was a daughter of Navy Officer Anton Frederik Lodewijk Troll (1875–1936) and Gesina Sara Hoek (1883–1956). From 1935 to 1938, Willem Jan was artillery officer aboard HNLMS Johan Maurits van Nassau, first stationed at the island of Curaçao in the Dutch Caribbean, and later escorting convoys in the Strait of Gibraltar. Willem Jan was promoted to lieutenant commander on 15 August 1938, and subsequently posted to the Department of the Navy in The Hague.

== World War II ==
In May 1940, at the beginning of World War II, as German forces invaded the Netherlands, Willem Jan was transferred to London with Dutch admiral Johan Fürstner, among others, in charge of the Dutch Admiralty's relocation to the United Kingdom. He was initially stationed in Bath as liaison officer. On 6 May 1942 he became captain of HNLMS Tjerk Hiddes, a British N-class destroyer launched on 25 June 1941 and transferred to the Royal Netherlands Navy in May 1942. The ship was named after the 17th century Dutch admiral, Tjerk Hiddes de Vries.

With HNLMS Tjerk Hiddes, Willem Jan actively participated in the fight against the enemy, initially escorting military convoy ships in the Indian Ocean. In September, the ship joined allied forces allocated to support landings in the Battle of Madagascar against the Vichy France government. In October, the ship joined the US 7th Fleet in the Port of Fremantle, Australia.

In December, Tjerk Hiddes was sent on a mission to evacuate troops from the Japanese occupied island of Timor. Dutch and Australian soldiers and civilians were trapped behind enemy lines during the Battle of Timor. Several evacuation attempts had failed after HMAS Voyager ran aground at Betano Bay and was damaged beyond repair by Japanese bombers. HMAS Armidale was also discovered and sunk by Japanese torpedo bombers.

Earlier, on the way to Darwin, HNLMS Tjerk Hiddes was spotted and attacked by a squadron of Japanese bombers from Timor. Willem Jan manoeuvred his ship successfully to avoid the bombs, but was forced to dump the depth charges to prevent that a hit or near miss on the stern would detonate the charges and damage or sink the ship.

On 9, 12 and 18 December 1942, the Tjerk Hiddes made three nightly voyages to Timor and evacuated over a thousand Australian Forces, Dutch troops and civilians to Darwin.

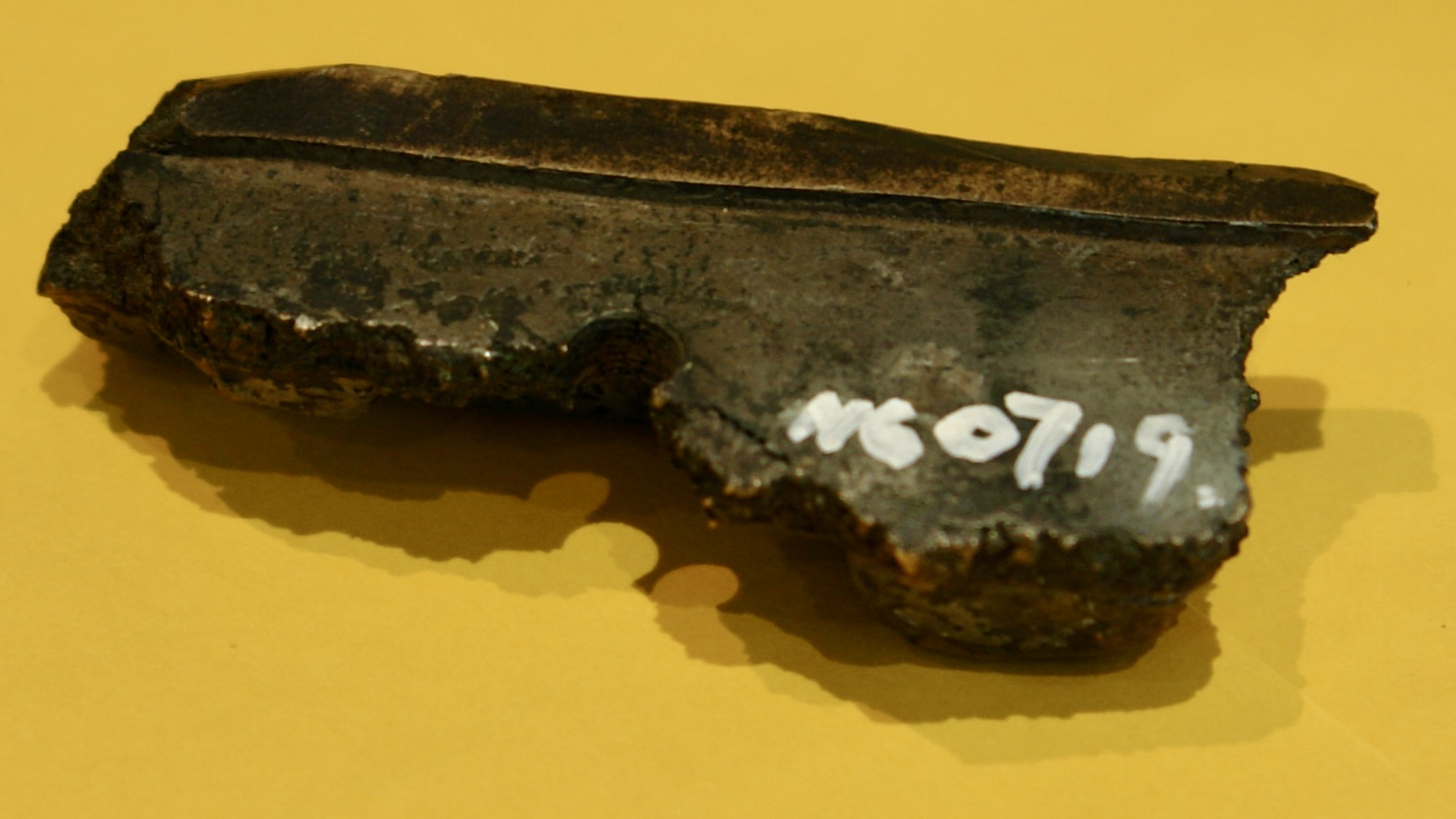
Shrapnel from the torpedo explosion on board the HNMLS Tjerk Hiddes (1943). Source: Western Australian Maritime Museum

On 8 January 1943, during maintenance work, one of the ship's torpedoes exploded, blowing a hole in the deck. Four Australian technicians and two crew members required treatment in hospital.

In February 1943, the Tjerk Hiddes, its sister ship Van Galen, the light cruiser HNMLS Tromp and the Australian cruiser HMAS Adelaide were deployed for Operation Pamphlet, a troop convoy escort between Fremantle, Sydney and Melbourne. This convoy carried the Australian 9th Division in four converted oceanliners including the SS New Amsterdam. The troops were recalled from Egypt by Australian Prime Minister John Curtin, in response to the Japanese threat to Australia.

Willem Jan was awarded the Legion of Merit by President Franklin Roosevelt for the Timor mission. The Tjerk Hiddes crew received the Dutch Cross for Important Military Operations (also known as the Expedition Cross). King George VI of the United Kingdom decorated Willem Jan with the Order of the British Empire (Officer Military Decision).

== Post-war period ==
In 1945 Willem Jan was appointed head of Navy training in London and in 1948 he was promoted to commander. He was closely involved in the Dutch-Indonesian Round Table Conference in 1949 about the transfer of sovereignty of the Dutch East Indies. He stayed in Australia for a number of months for the Royal Netherlands Navy. On 1 August 1952 he was promoted to captain and sent back to The Hague. He was involved with the construction of the two new Zeven Provinciën class light cruisers De Ruyter and De Zeven Provinciën. The previous cruiser carrying the name De Ruyter was sunk in the Battle of the Java Sea in 1942.

On 18 November 1953 Willem Jan became the first captain of the new cruiser HNLMS De Ruyter, built at the Wilton-Fijenoord shipyard in Rotterdam. The ship was commissioned in the presence of Her Majesty Queen Juliana of the Netherlands.

In his speech at the ceremony Willem Jan said:

"We now have the privilege of serving again on board a new cruiser, which has been named De Ruyter by Your Majesty. For us, this name is not only linked to that of the greatest admiral of the Netherlands, but also to the previous cruiser of that name, which rests in the Java Sea. On one hand, this means that the great tradition and the honour of serving on board a ship with that name will continue. On the other hand, there is the inspiring example of true heroism, shown by our contemporaries in the service of their country. (...) we will give our best efforts to this beautiful new ship, guided by one inspiring thought to make it, with God's blessing, the pride of your fleet."

In August 1955 Willem Jan was appointed interim rear admiral. In June 1956 the newspapers reported that he had criticised former Prime Minister Willem Drees during a speech at the launch of minesweeper HNLMS Sneek, because Drees was said to be in favour of reducing naval expenditure. Drees’ government was in caretaker mode at the time. Questions were asked in the lower house by Member of Parliament Carl Romme. Willem Jan maintained that his words were taken out of context. The Navy Information Service subsequently announced that Willem Jan's statements were not intended as criticism. Nevertheless, Cornelis Staf, Minister of War, was of the opinion that the comments were regrettable because they could be interpreted as a judgement of the government's policy, even though they were not intended as such.

On 4 September 1956 Willem Jan became rear admiral. His promotion to vice admiral followed on 4 September 1958, making him the third admiral Kruys. On behalf of the government of the US, ambassador to the Netherlands Mr. Philip Young, awarded him the Legion of Merit on 15 November 1960, for his skilful leadership with regards to the contribution of the Royal Netherlands Navy within NATO. This was the second time he received the US military decoration.

Willem Jan was co-founder and chairman of the Dutch Anchorites, chairman of the Mars & Mercurius Officers Association, chairman and honorary member of the Royal Netherlands Navy Yacht Club, co-founder and board member of the Karel Doorman Fund for war victims and member of the board of advice of the Dutch Veterans Legion. He was chief commissioner of Sea Scouting Netherlands.

His Royal Netherlands Navy uniform (pattern 1959), including cap and vice admiral's monkey jacket, is part of the collection of the National Maritime Museum in Greenwich, London. His 7.65mm Sauer & Sohn M3 automatic handgun (1933) is on display in the military museum in Driebergen-Rijsenburg, the Netherlands.

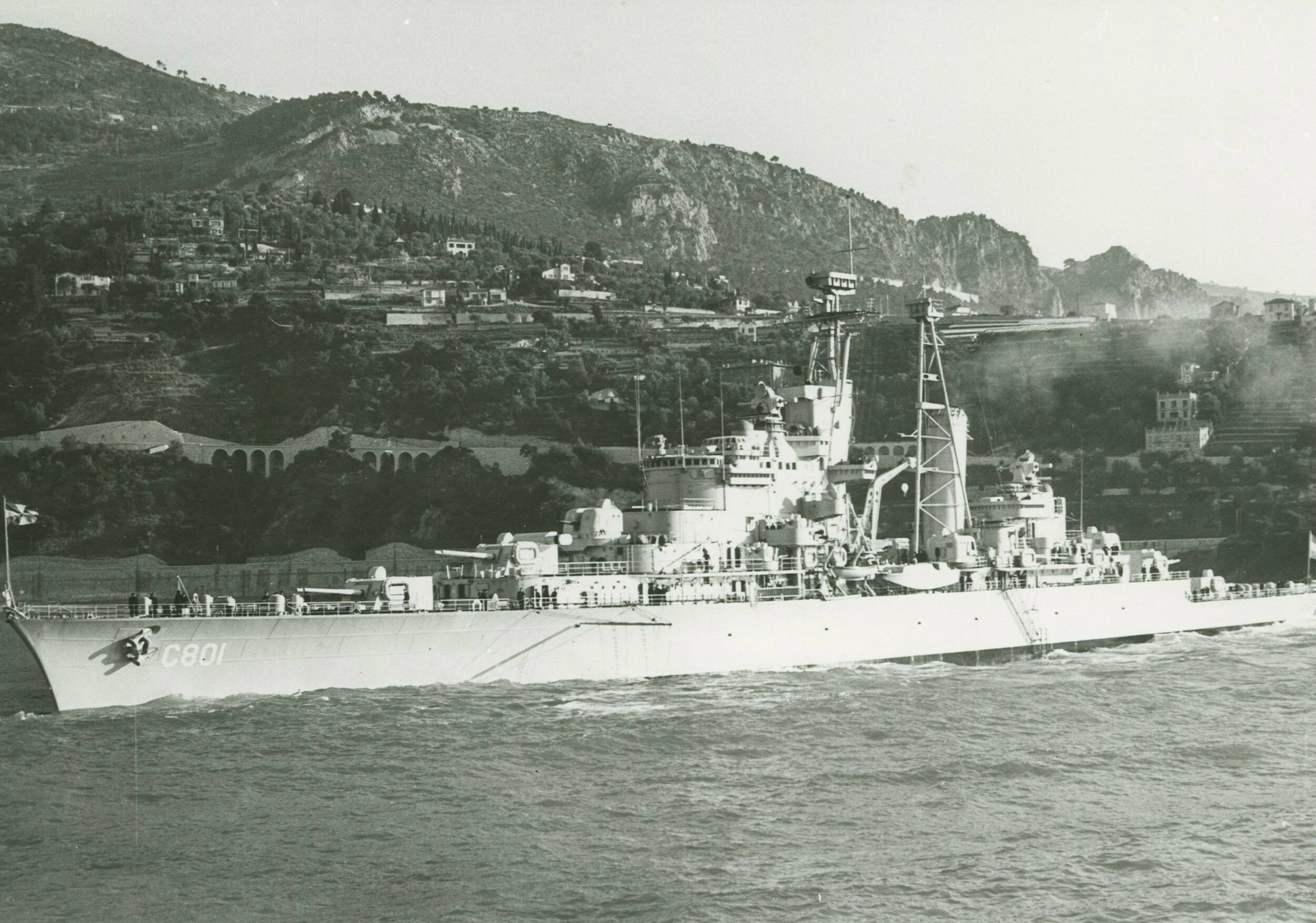
On November 18, 1953, W. J. Kruys became captain of the new cruiser HNLMS De Ruyter

== Civilian career ==
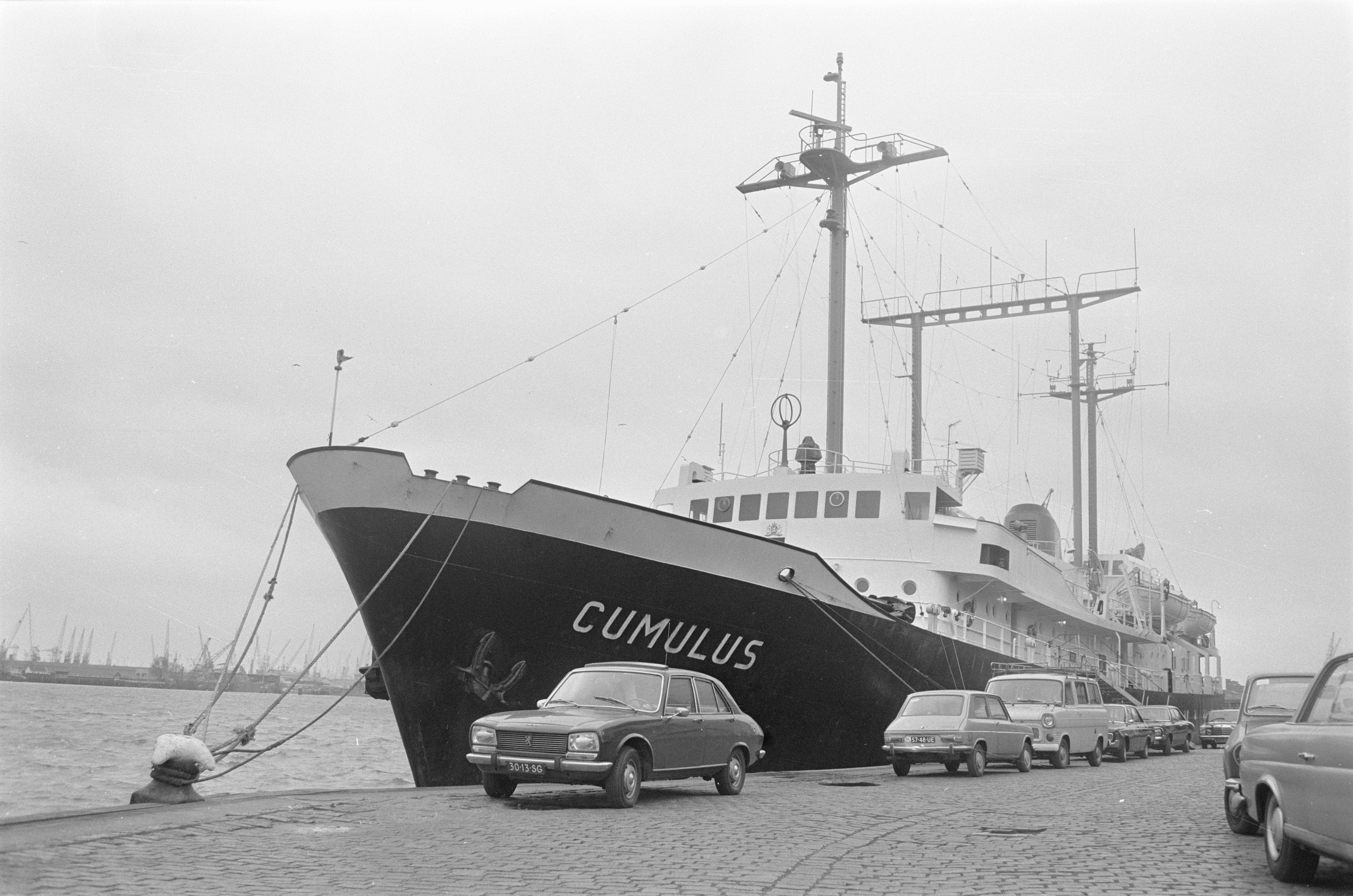
On 18 April 1963 director-general W. J. Kruys took receipt of weathership Cumulus on behalf of the National Aviation Authority (Dutch: Rijksluchtvaartdienst).

Willem Jan retired from the Royal Netherlands Navy on 16 September 1960 and became deputy director-general of the National Aviation Authority (Dutch: Rijksluchtvaartdienst).

During his Navy career, Willem Jan had been involved with Navy aviation services on a regular basis. During WWII he worked with the United States to use radar-equipped destroyers as aircraft control ships and warning stations against enemy aircraft, which was introduced in the battle against Japan. He was involved with the introduction of the British Hawker FGA-50 Seahawk fighter aircraft in the Netherlands. He contributed to the joint NATO project Atlantic anti-submarine aircraft and the Satco automated air traffic control system.

In 1962 he became director-general of the National Aviation Authority and was involved with the expansion of Amsterdam Airport Schiphol, the development of other airports in the Netherlands and the training of commercial pilots. On 18 April 1963 Willem Jan took receipt of weathership Cumulus on behalf of the aviation authority. On 24 February 1969 he approved certification for the new Fokker F28 Fellowship.

He returned to Australia several times to meet with his counterpart Sir Don Anderson, director-general of the Australian Department of Civil Aviation. On one of his trips to Melbourne he negotiated that the weekly number of passengers KLM Royal Dutch Airlines were allowed to fly to Sydney increased from 42 to 75, while Dutch emigrants to Australia remained exempt from that numerical restriction. In return, Australian airline Qantas obtained permission to add Amsterdam Schiphol to the existing link between Sydney and London, with a Boeing 707 scheduled to stop once weekly in each direction. Willem Jan retired in 1971.

Willem Jan and his wife Anna Troll had a daughter, two sons and five grandchildren. Willem Jan died in Bilthoven on 20 April 1985.

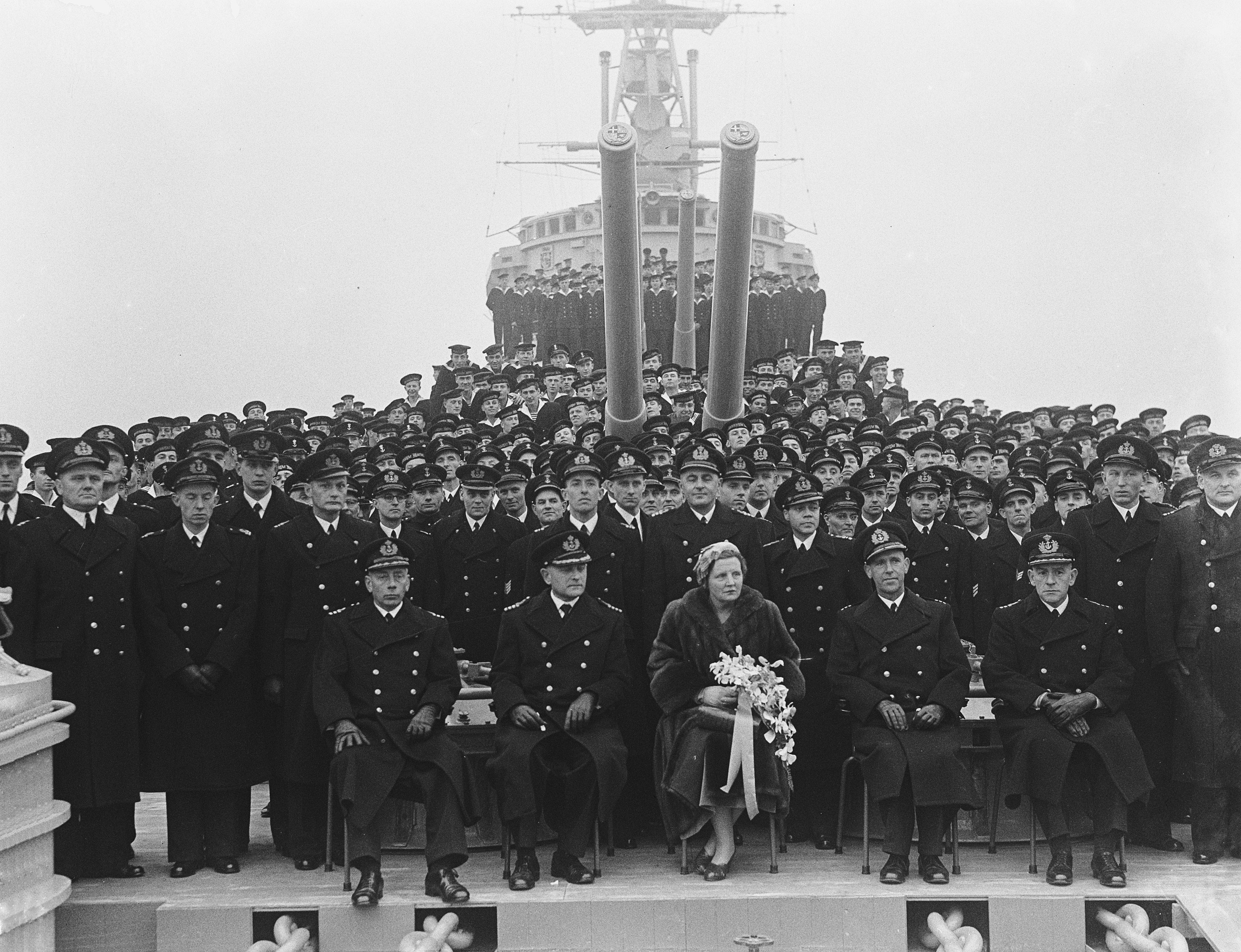
Her Majesty Queen Juliana of the Netherlands and Captain W. J. Kruys with Officers and crew at the commissioning of HNLMS De Ruyter (1953)
