= Kruys =

Dutch patrician family

- Patrician family
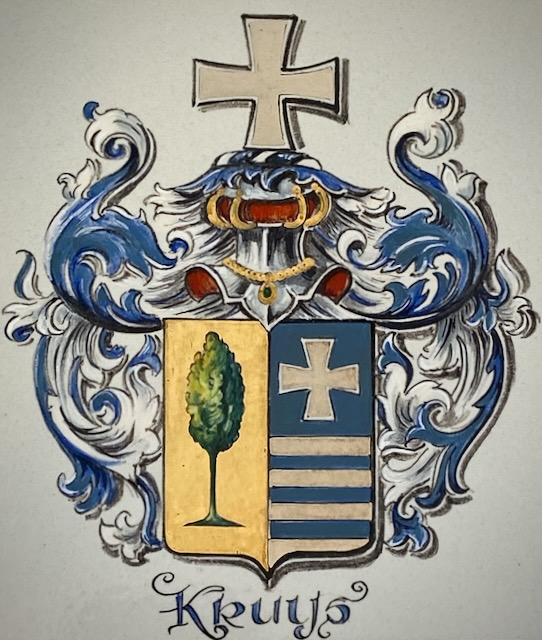
- Country: Netherlands
- Founded: Seventeenth century

Kruys is an old Dutch Patrician family. Since the seventeenth century members of the Kruys family have been active in the Dutch National Cabinet, town councils, Royal Netherlands Navy command and the international business and trade community.

== History ==
The name Kruys is derived from the Dutch word for 'cross' (Dutch: 'kruis'), which is one of the main elements in the family coat of arms. A common early spelling variant is 'Kruijs'.

The oldest known family member is Lambert Koeps (Kops, Coops), born in Vriezenveen in 1585 or 1586. His grandson Berend (1610–1682) was the first to carry the name Kruys. Claas Jansen Kruys (1667–1739) was church master and magistrate (Schout) of Vriezenveen from 1709 to 1739, and Jan Kruys (1767–1830) became the first Mayor of Vriezenveen from 1825 to 1830.

Over the centuries Kruys family members have settled in St Petersburg, Russia (between 1720 and 1917), the former Dutch East Indies (Indonesia), the United Kingdom, Sweden, the United States, Canada and Australia.

The genealogy of the Kruys family has been recorded since 1914 in the Dutch Patriciate Blue Book (Blauwe Boekje), published by the Centrum voor familiegeschiedenis in The Hague. The Kruys family archives are kept at the Dutch Institute of Military History in The Hague and the Historical Museum in Vriezenveen.

== Coat of arms ==
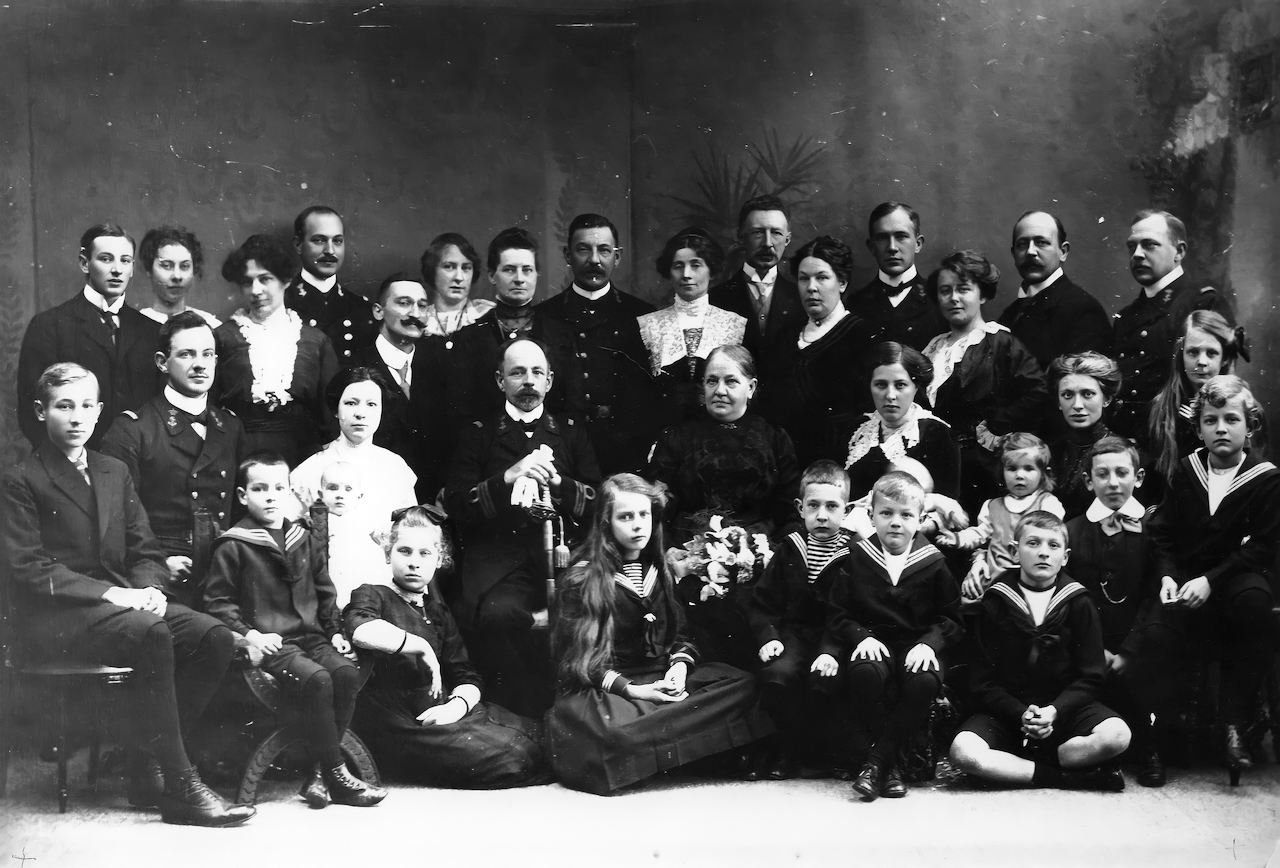
The Kruys family ca 1918

The Kruys family coat of arms has been in use since the nineteenth century, according to lacquer prints in the family. An early nineteenth-century stamp seal, owned by the family, in which the oak tree appears with the inscription "Magistrate of Vriezenveen", suggests that the oak tree is the original shield element of the coat of arms, and the left part is a nineteenth-century addition.

The Kruys shield elements are, in gold, a green oak tree planted on loose soil. On the other side two cross sections: in blue, a silver Maltese cross and underneath, in silver, three blue crossbars. The crest consists of the cross from the shield, with silver and blue mantling. Some have suggested that the Kruys family coat of arms and the municipal coat of arms of the Dutch town Vriezenveen in the province of Overijssel, have the same origin.

== Notable members ==
=== Gerhardus Kruys (1838–1902) ===
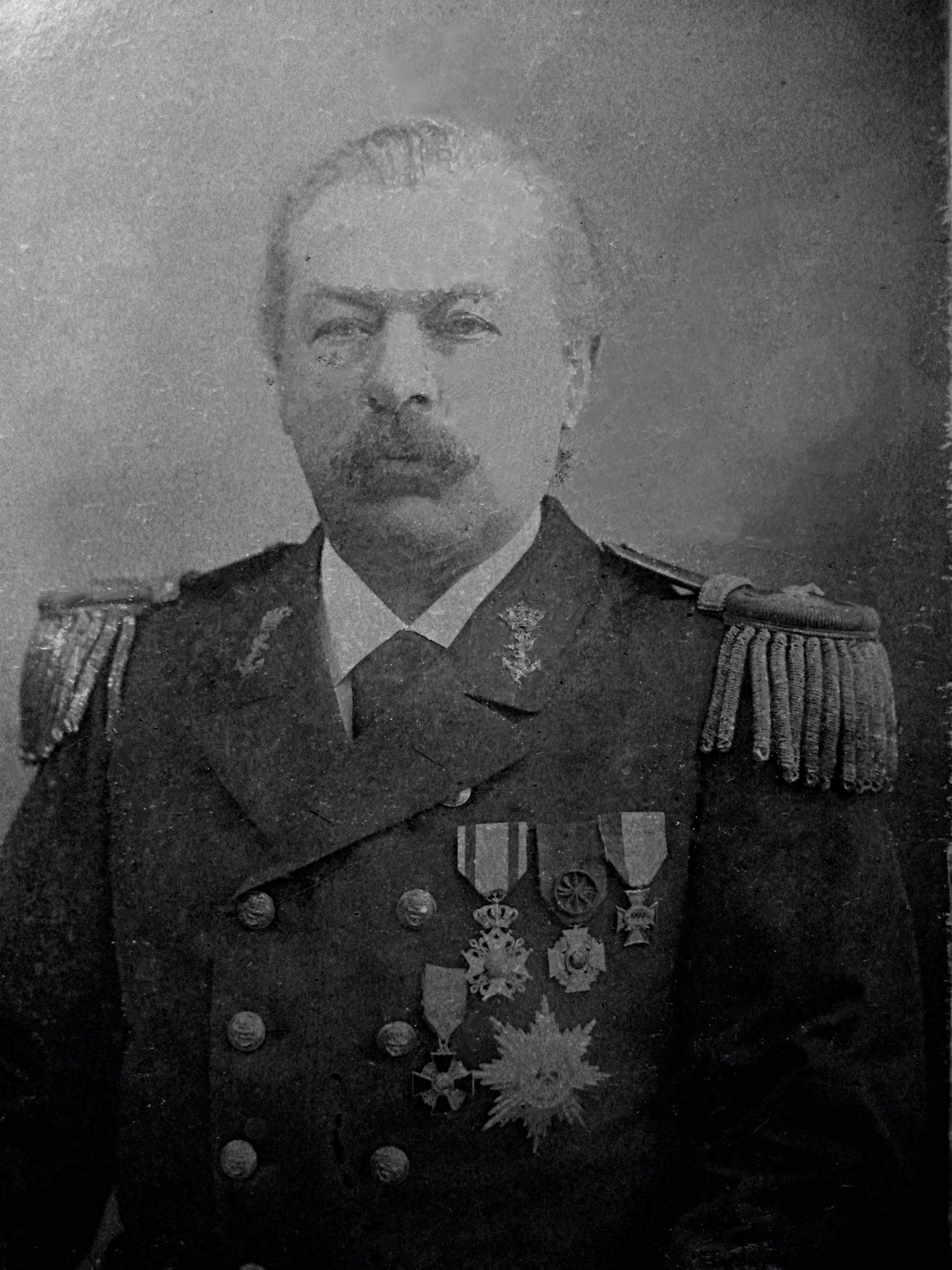
Minister of Navy Gerhardus Kruys

Gerhardus Kruys was born in Vriezenveen, on 21 August, 1838. His father, Claas Kruys (1802–1877), was Mayor of Vriezenveen.

Gerhardus was chief of the Royal Netherlands Navy when he first became Minister of Navy. He served in the Mackay Government (from 31 March 1891-21 August 1891) and later in the Kuyper Government (1 August 1901–12 December 1902).

During his career he was commander of the Navy in the Dutch East Indies and chief of the Navy Department in Batavia. In 1888 he became a member of a committee tasked with reviewing the Dutch defence legislation.

In 1892 he was part of a committee that made recommendations to modernise the defence force. He advocated for the development of armoured ships and cruisers by the Royal Netherlands Navy. At the end of the nineteenth century, this led to the construction of HNLMS Piet Hein and other ships in the Evertsen class and the production of six protected cruisers in the Holland class.

On 1 August 1894, Gerhardus was promoted to vice admiral. He was awarded Commander of the Order of the Lion of The Netherlands (Commandeur in de Orde van de Nederlandse Leeuw).

Gerhardus and his wife Elisabeth Gallas (1843–1919) had two daughters and seven sons. Six of his sons became Navy Officers, including vice admiraal Theodoor Louis Kruys (1884–1940).

His grandson Gerhardus Kruys (1907–1982) was a captain in the Royal Netherlands Navy. Another grandson, Willem Jan Kruys (1906–1985) became vice admiral. A third grandson, naval lieutenant Gerhard Rudolph Kruys (1913–1941), died during World War II at the age of 28.

Gerhardus died in The Hague on 12 December 1902, at the age of 64. He was buried at Oud Eik en Duinen cemetery.

=== Hendrik Kruys (1851–1907) ===
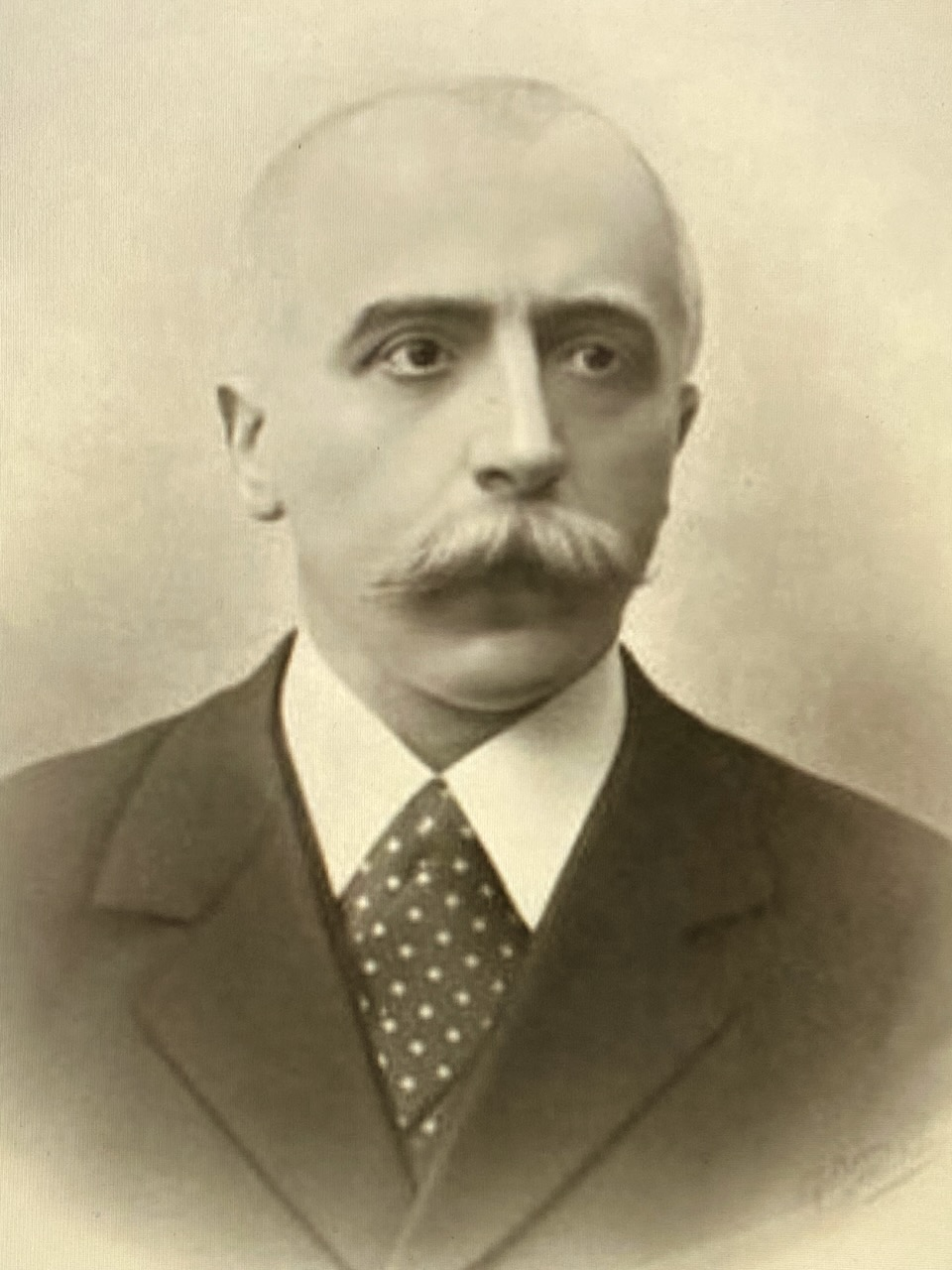
Hendrik Kruys

Gerhardus' half brother, Hendrik Kruys, was a successful trader and member of the ‘Rusluie’, a community of Dutch expats living in the city of Saint Petersburg in Russia between 1720 and 1917. They originally came from the town of Vriezenveen in the Netherlands, and the community included several members of the Kruys family.

According to a description in the diary of Hendrik's uncle Jacob Kruys (1812–1852), the 2,400 kilometres journey by covered wagon from Vriezenveen to Saint Petersburg led through Osnabrück, Berlin and Riga, and took 15 days at the time.

In 1868 Hendrik travelled to Saint Petersburg by train, where he became an apprentice at the Dutch firm Engberts & Co, selling linnen. In 1884 Hendrik started his own trading house, ‘Java’ on Grosse Morskaya 38, where he sold Dutch Coffee and cocoa, as well as tea, spices, liquor and other products. As cocoa became more popular, Hendrik opened six more businesses in the Russian city. He was also the sole representative for Blooker's cocoa in Russia and made many sales trips across European Russia.

In his diary (archived at the Vriezenveen Historical Museum), Hendrik recorded many events and developments, including the beginning of the first Russian Revolution of 1905: "A lot of commotion in the city and people shot by soldiers. Many shops were looted, but thankfully Java was not damaged."

After the revolution of 1917 the situation in Saint Petersburg worsened, which eventually signalled the end of the Dutch-Russian community.

Hendrik and his wife Alida Boom (1861–1940) had one daughter and three sons. He died in Vriezenveen on 24 May 1907, at the age of 55.

=== Willem Jan Kruys (1906–1985) ===
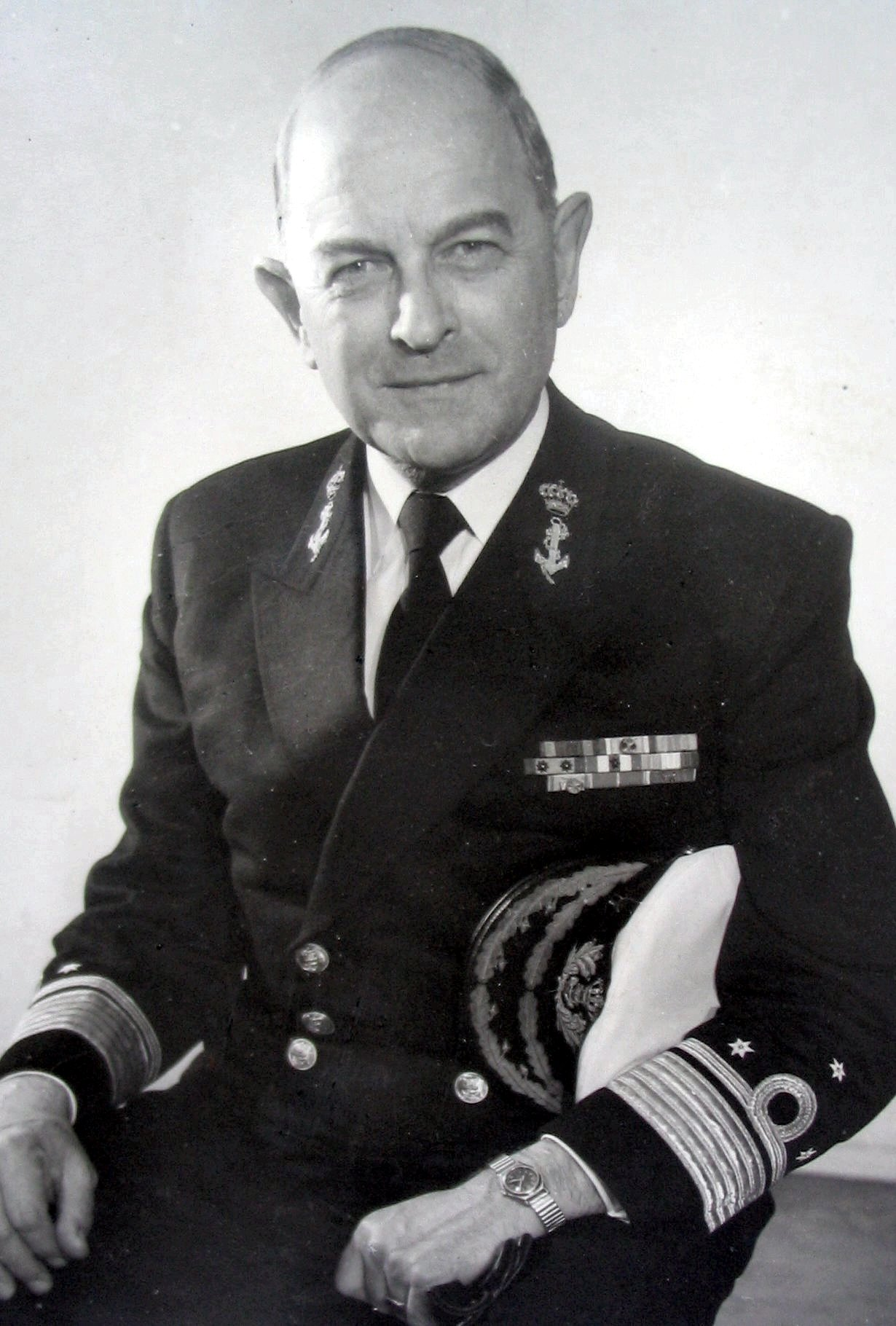
Vice admiral Willem Jan Kruys

Willem Jan Kruys is a grandson of minister and vice admiral Gerhardus Kruys. He was born in Pankalan Brandan, Sumatra, in the Dutch East Indies.

During World War II, Willem Jan was commander lieutenant of the Dutch Destroyer HNLMS Tjerk Hiddes, performing convoy escort duties in the Indian Ocean before joining the US 7th Fleet (1942), stationed in the Port of Fremantle, Western Australia.

In 1942 HNLMS Tjerk Hiddes embarked on a mission to remove Allied troops stranded on Timor in enemy territory. When Timor yielded to the Imperial Japanese Army, Australian and Dutch troops had been cut off in the mountainous jungle, and embarked upon a guerrilla war against the Japanese. On 9, 15 and 18 December, the Tjerk Hiddes made three voyages to Timor and evacuated over a thousand Australian Forces, Dutch troops and civilians to Darwin in Australia.

Willem Jan was awarded the Legion of Merit by President Roosevelt: "By his fearless determination, excellent judgment, and outstanding professional ability throughout this period, he brought to a successful conclusion an extremely difficult and perilous mission." The Tjerk Hiddes crew received the Dutch Cross for Important Military Operations (also known as the Expedition Cross).

He was closely involved in the 1949 Dutch-Indonesian Round Table Conference about the transfer of sovereignty of the Dutch East Indies. On 18 November 1953, Willem Jan became the first captain of the new Zeven Provinciën class light cruiser HNLMS De Ruyter. On 4 September 1958, he was promoted to vice admiral, making him the third Admiral Kruys. After his retirement from the Royal Netherlands Navy he became director-general of the Dutch National Aviation Authority (Dutch: Rijksluchtvaartdienst) from 1962 tot 1971.

Willem Jan was awarded Knight of the Order of the Lion of The Netherlands and Commander of the Order of Orange-Nassau. From King George V he received the Order of the British Empire.

Willem Jan and his wife Anna Troll (1911–1998) had one daughter and two sons. He died in Bilthoven on 20 April 1985, at the age of 79.

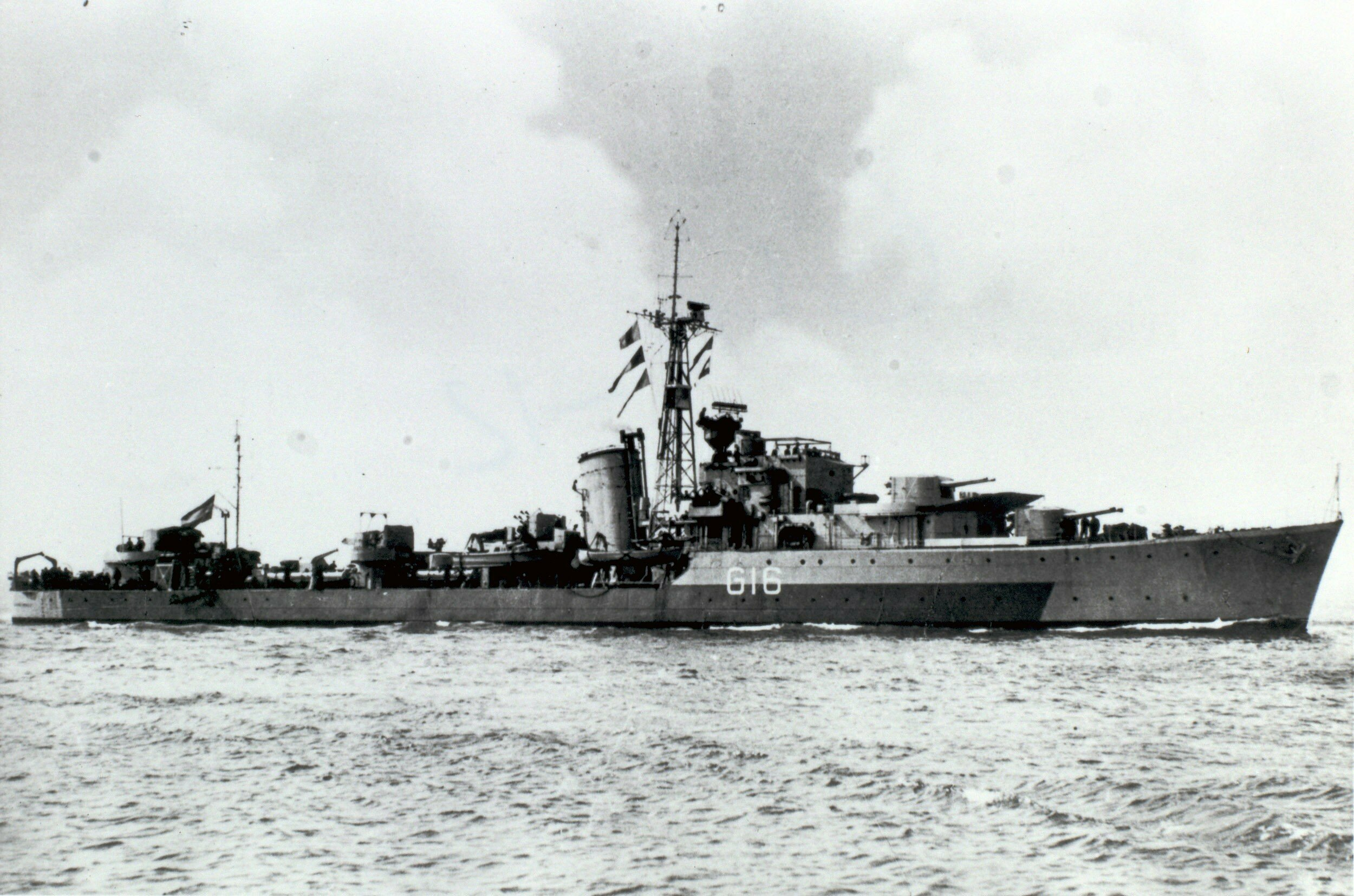
The Destroyer HNLMS Tjerk Hiddes under command of Willem Jan Kruys from 1942 to 1944

=== Gerhard Rudolph Kruys (1913–1941) ===
Lieutenant Gerhard Kruys was 28 years old when he was reported missing in the South China Sea in 1941. His father, naval captain Johannes Adrianus Kruys (1886–1974) was a son of minister Gerhardus Kruys.

In the summer of 1937, Gerhard married Leonardie Bronkhorst in Surabaya, Java, in the Dutch East Indies. The following year they had a son, Rudolph Leonard Kruys (1938–1943).

During World War II, Gerhard served on the HNLMS K XVII, a submarine of the K XIV-class, built by the Rotterdam shipyard Wilton-Fijenoord as a patrol ship to protect the Dutch East Indies. The K XVII patrolled the South China Sea and the Gulf of Siam (Thailand). The last contact with the ship took place on December 19, 1941. Gerhard and the crew of 36 disappeared at sea. The location of the ship and the nature of the disappearance were unknown for a long time.

More than 40 years later, on May 2, 1982, the wreck of a submarine found on the seabed off the coast of Tioman Island in Malaysia was identified as the HNLMS K XVII. Investigations revealed that the ship had sailed into a Japanese minefield, struck a mine and sank. In 1998 the wreck was photographed by a film crew from Singapore.

In 2019, a scientific expedition discovered that the K XVII had disappeared. An imprint of the ship's hull in the seabed was all that remained.

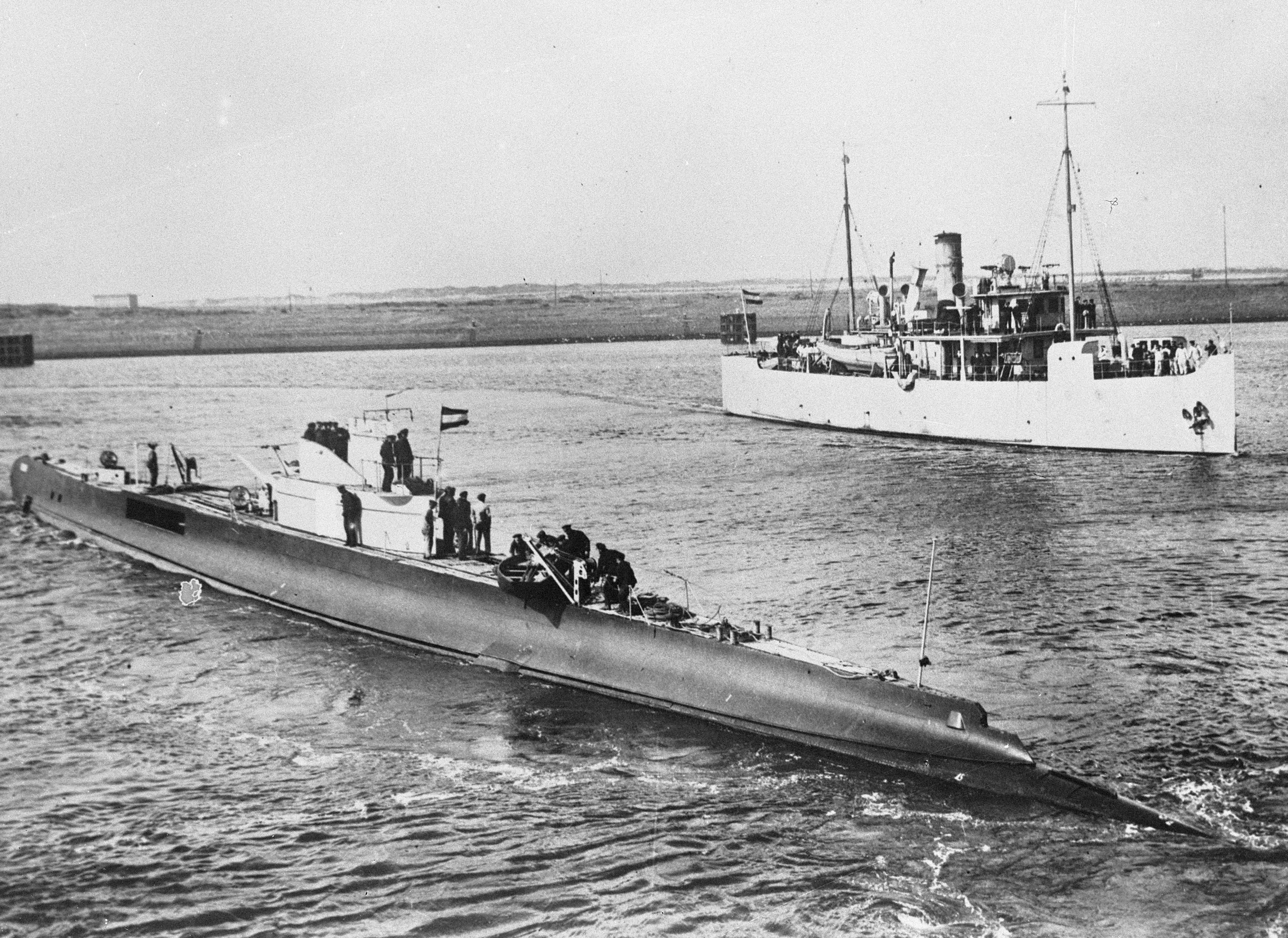
HNLMS K XVII submarine (ca. 1940–1942)

=== Jan Kruys (1767–1830) ===
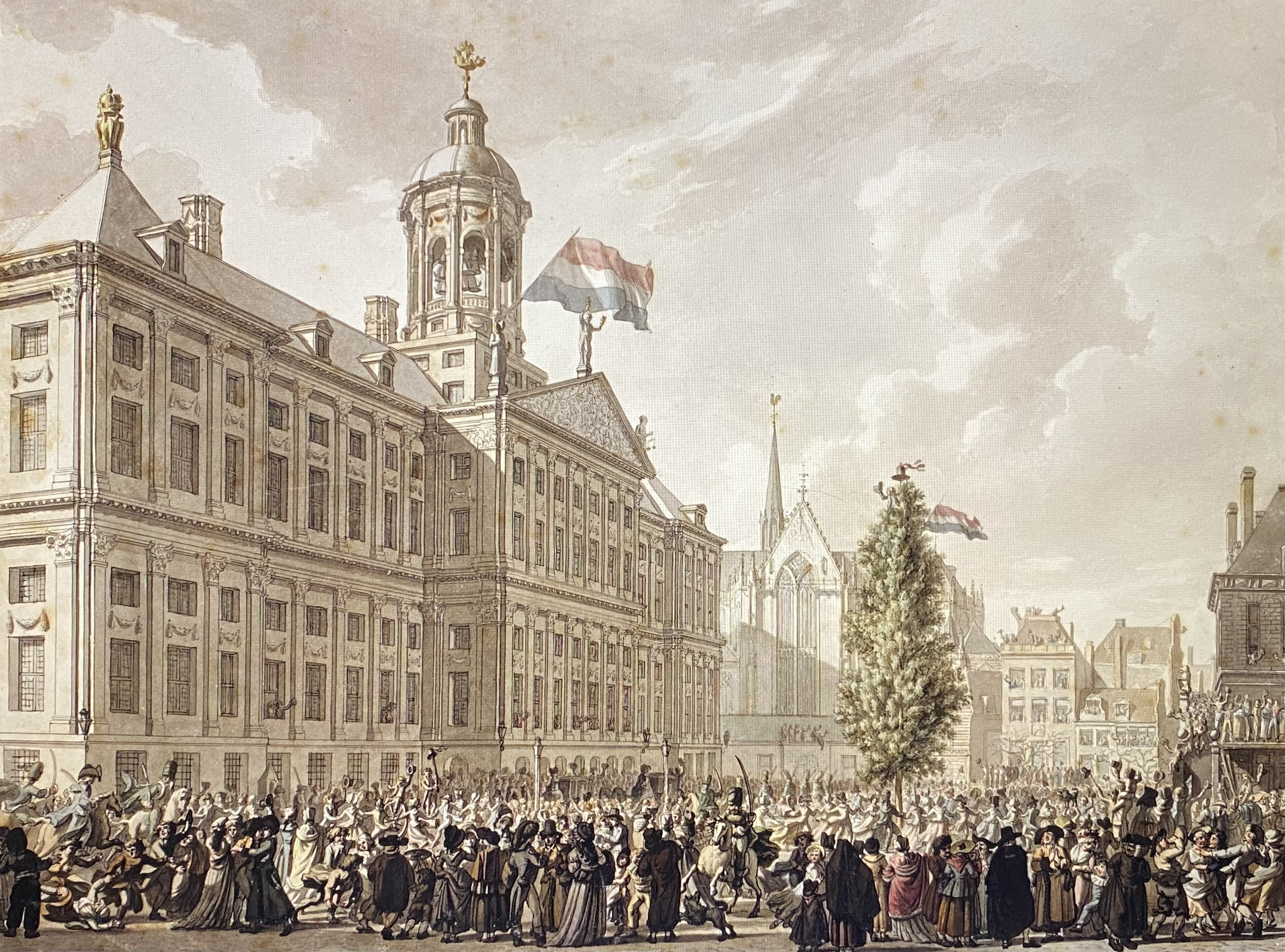
Tree of Liberty, Dam Square in Amsterdam (Jurriaan Andriessen, 1795). People dancing around the tree of liberty. On the left the town hall (now Royal Palace). Source: Amsterdam City Archives.

Jan Kruys was the first Mayor of the town of Vriezenveen. He is grandfather of minister and vice admiral Gerhardus Kruys.

Jan was born in Vriezenveen. His father, Claas Jansen Kruys (1731–1802), was a merchant at the firm Kruys, Engberts & Sons, exporting linen and other goods to Hamburg, Frankfurt, Strasbourg and Allicante. From 1781 tot 1789, Jan and his brother Johannes Kruys (1769–1806) worked with their father at the family business in St Petersburg. After eight years Jan left Russia and began a business in Amsterdam. He returned to Vriezenveen in 1799.

In 1818 he became magistrate (Dutch: Schout) of Vriezenveen and from 1825 the first Mayor of the town until his death in 1830.

Between 1817 and 1830, Jan kept a detailed diary. The fourteen books are archived at the Dutch Institute of Military History (NIMH). In one of his entries he describes how in 1795, 2000 cavalry of the French Revolutionary Army rode into Amsterdam, where he lived at the time, marking the proclamation of the Dutch Batavian Republic. He wrote: “A tree of liberty was planted in front of the town hall and people were out and about and cheering.” (transcription: Erik Berkhof, Frans Harwig)

Jan was married to Anna Broers (1772–1793), who died in childbirth. Jan and his second wife Maria Johanna Ursinus Grevenstein (1774–1845) had six daughters and five sons. He died in Vriezenveen (Oosteinde 148) on 22 December 1830, at the age of 63.

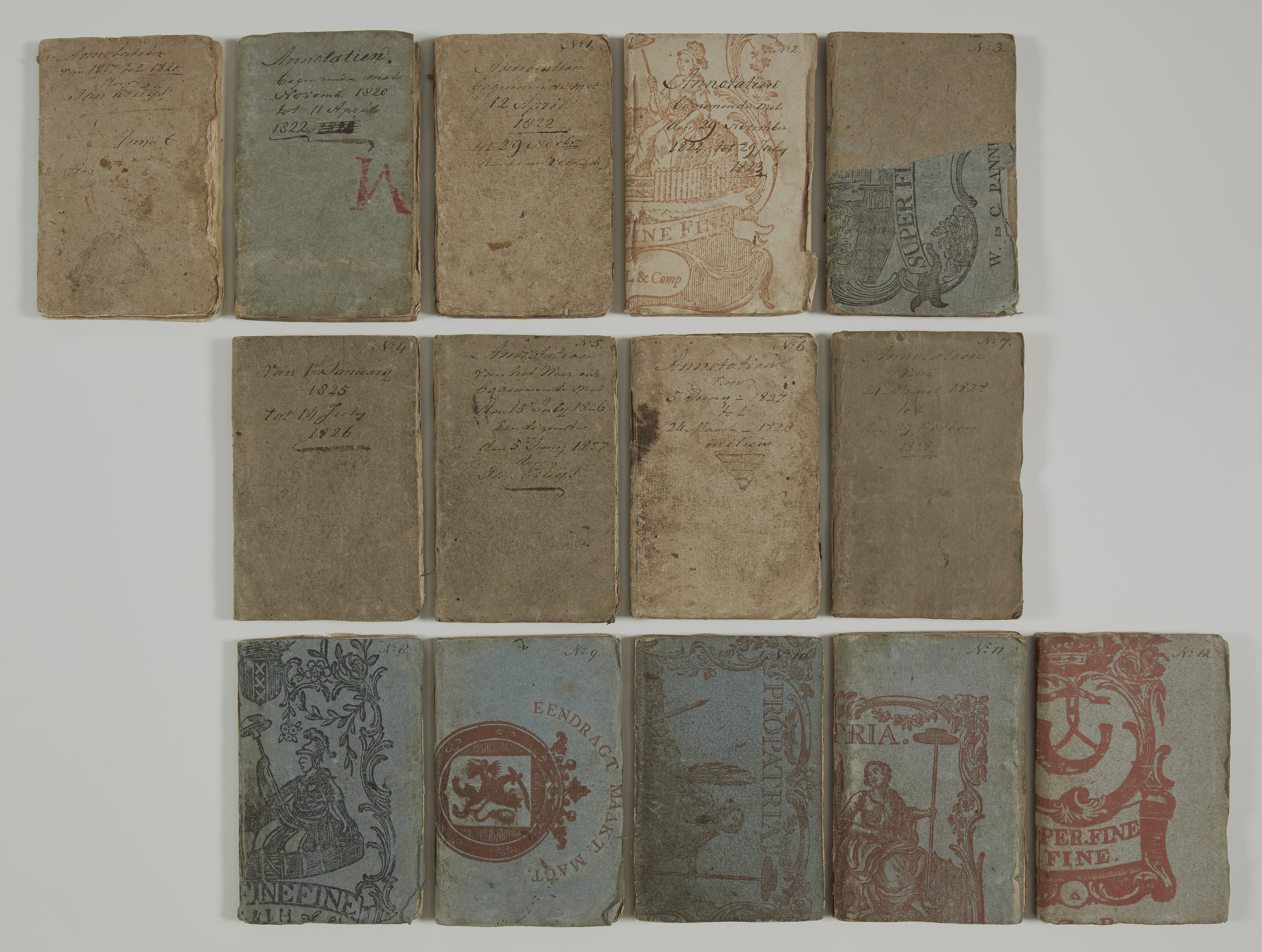
The 14 volumes of the diary of Jan Kruys (1817-1830)

=== Claas Kruys (1802–1877) ===
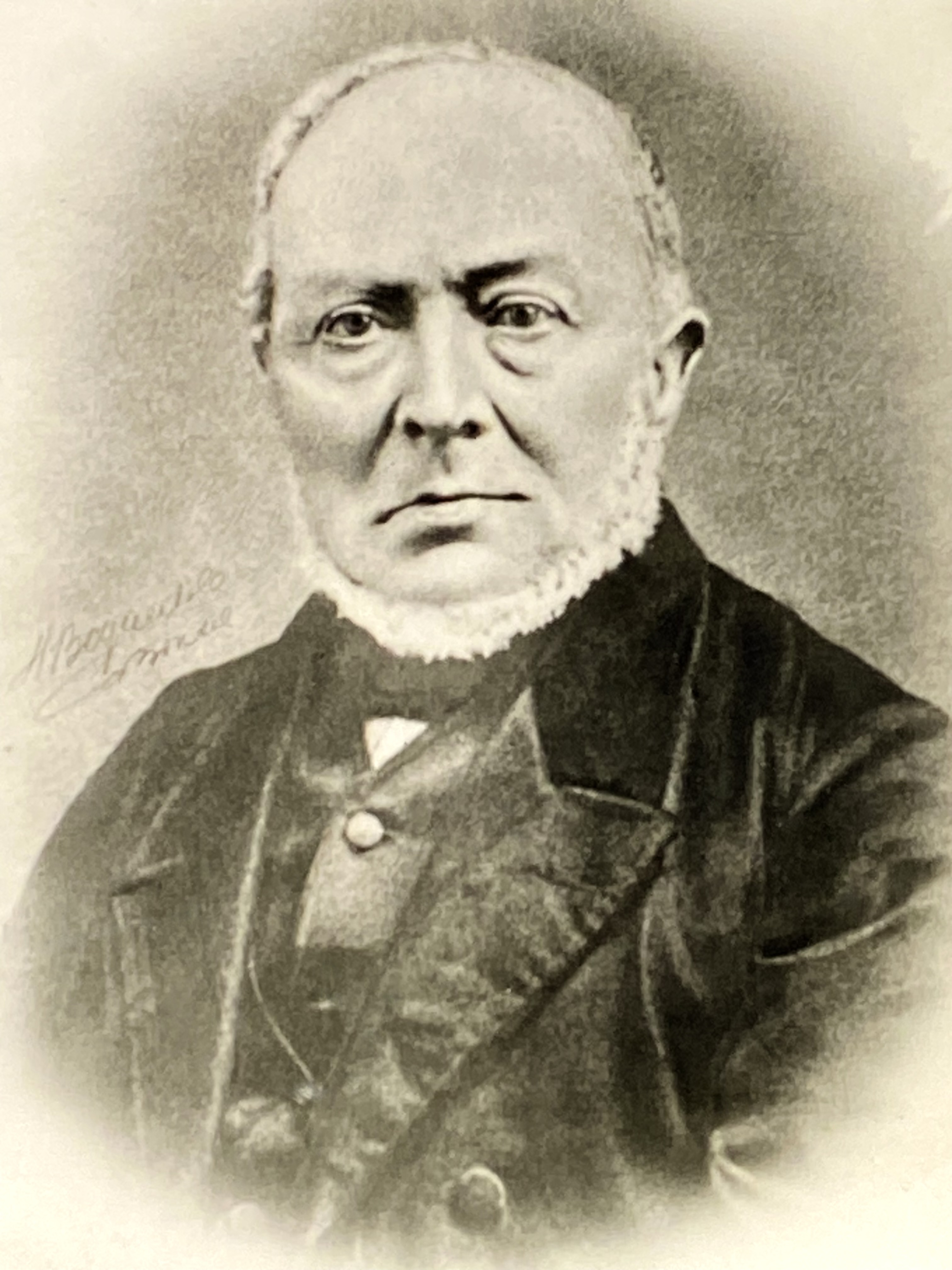
Claas Kruys, merchant and Mayor of Vriezenveen

Claas Kruys was a merchant at the firm Jansen, Joost & Co in Saint Petersburg, before becoming Mayor of Vriezenveen in 1852. His term of office lasted until 1870.

Claas was the son of Gerhardus Kruys (1771–1839) and Aaltje Winter (1777–1848), both from Vriezenveen. His father was the brother of Jan Kruys (1767–1830), the first Mayor of Vriezenveen.

Claas married his cousin Jesina Juliana Kruys (1810–1847) on June 30, 1832. She was the daughter of Jan Kruys. They had seven children, including Gerhardus Kruys, who later became minister of Navy and vice-admiral. Jesina died at the age of 36. Claas remarried four years later, on February 8, 1851, to Frederika Bramer (1823–1899). They had a son, Hendrik Kruys, and a daughter Jesina Kruys, who died at the age of 5.

Claas died in Vriezenveen on March 20, 1877, at the age of 74.
