= Vasily Berkov =

Vasily Ivanovich Berkov (Василий Иванович Берков)
- Wicher Berkhoff
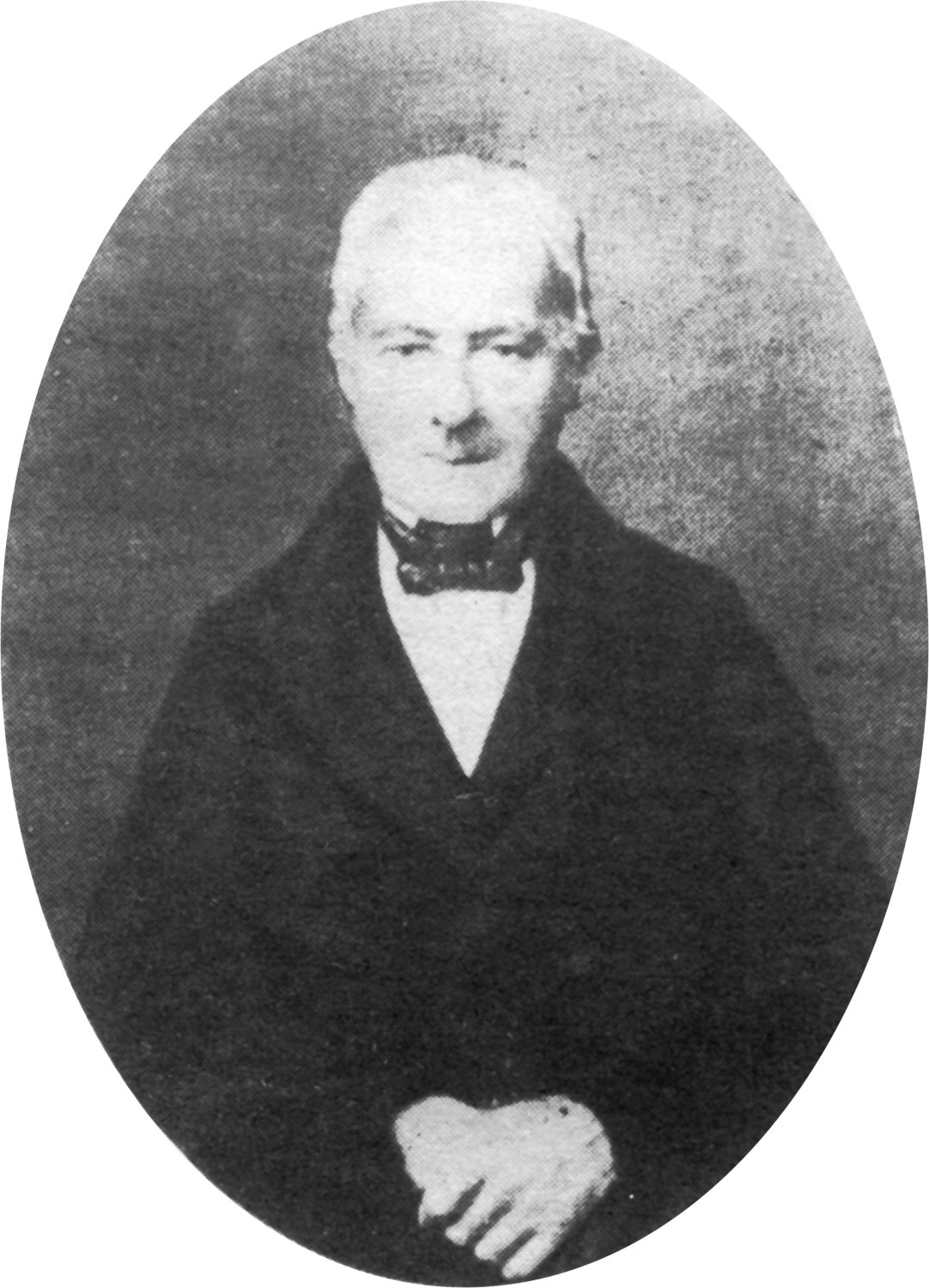
- Born: August 21, 1794; Vriezenveen, Netherlands
- Died: April 5, 1870 (aged 75); Saint Petersburg, Russia
- Occupations: Shipbuilder, Director Admiralty Shipyard, Saint Petersburg, Russia
- Years active: 1815/16-1870
- Known for: translating West-European shipbuilding literature into the Russian language

Vasily Ivanovich Berkov (Russian: Василий Иванович Берков) (Dutch: Wicher Berkhoff) (21 August 1794 in Vriezenveen, Netherlands – 5 April 1870 in Saint Petersburg, Russia) was a Russian shipbuilder and from 1829 to 1870 Director of the Admiralty Shipyard of Saint Petersburg, possibly in the rank of Counter-Admiral. Berkov deserves special credit for his translations of West-European literature on shipbuilding into Russian. He was one of the so-called Rusluie, a Dutch community in 18th and 19th century Saint Petersburg, most of whose members originated from Vriezenveen, Berkov's native town.

== Education ==
Berkov was the son of carpenter Albert Berends Berkhoff and Berendina van den Bosch, and left his native town at an early age for Saint Petersburg, where his grandparents Frederik van den Bosch and Clasina de Vries took him into their care. Unlike many of his peers who went into trade, Berkov decided on a career in the shipbuilding industry. In either 1815 or 1816 he successfully completed his six-year civilian apprenticeship program at the College for Shipbuilding Architecture in Saint Petersburg as a shipwright.

== Career ==
From 1815–16 to 1825 Berkov worked as Deputy Master-Shipbuilder at the Lodejnopolskaja Shipyard, in the Grebnoj Docks in Saint Petersburg, at the shipyards in the Don basins and in the Novgorod district. Here he built ships destined for inland shipping, as well as private luxury yachts for two senior civil servants: Viktor Kochubey and Aleksey Arakcheyev. He was also involved in the building of the Enterprise, the ship of explorer Otto Von Kotzebue. After a brief career in 1825 as Master-Shipbuilder at Saint Petersburg's City Wharfs, in 1826 he accepted the position of Deputy Navy-Inspector for Innovative and Technological Requirements, at his former training college.

This civilian college merged in 1826 with the equivalent navy college into the Academy of Navy Engineers. The training academy in St. Petersburg still exists under the name of Higher Academy for Marine Engineers (Военно-морского инженерного училища). In 1829 Berkov returned to the City Wharfs as Director. As such he participated in the merging in 1841–43 of the civilian City Wharfs with the adjacent Navy Admiralty Shipyard into the New Admiralty Shipyard, of which he became Director. He continued this position until his death in 1870. In the hierarchy of the Russian social class system, Berkov rose to the civilian rank of Acting State Councilor (4th class), which equals the rank of Counter-Admiral in the Navy. Whether Berkov had actually held a Navy Admiral rank is subject of debate among Dutch historians.

== Translator ==
Berkov was highly regarded in shipbuilding circles for his translations of shipbuilding literature into the Russian language. He had a talent for languages and was fluent in English, German, French, Russian and Dutch. Due to his origins in the village of Vriezenveen, he most likely was also fluent in Low Saxon. Many of his translated works were published under Russian State authority. He also compiled the first Russian textbook on naval architecture, including a manual on the construction of yachts.

== Personal life ==
On May 13, 1821, Berkov married Aleksandra Volkova (1804–after 1870), daughter of the Imperial Cup Bearer/Table Setter Ivan Prokovievich Volkov and Nadezhda Volkova. The Russian Orthodox marriage took place in the St. Nicholas Naval Cathedral in Saint Petersburg. They are known to have had six children from this marriage: Elena (b.ca.1828), Nadezhda (b.1834), Viktor (b.1837), Aleksandra (b.1840), Maria (b.1842) and Alexander (b.1844). In 1846 Berkov acquired Russian nationality, and in 1847 he ascended into the Russian hereditary peerage. Despite his career in Russian service, Berkov stayed in contact with the Dutch merchant community in Saint Petersburg. In later life he returned once more to his birthplace Vriezenveen, where even his own sister did not recognize him. After his death in 1870 he was buried in the Evangelical-Lutheran Volkovo Cemetery in Saint Petersburg. His grave can still be found there today. In 2007 the Municipality of Vriezenveen named a street in his honour.

== Honours ==
- Order of Saint Vladimir, 4th class (1834)
- Order of Saint Stanislaus, 2nd class (1836)
- Order of Saint Anne, 2nd class with crown (1840)
- Crimean War Medal (1853–56)
