= Hendrik Kruys =

Dutch nineteenth century trader

Hendrik Kruys (1851–1907) was a Dutch trader and entrepreneur in Saint Petersburg, Russia.

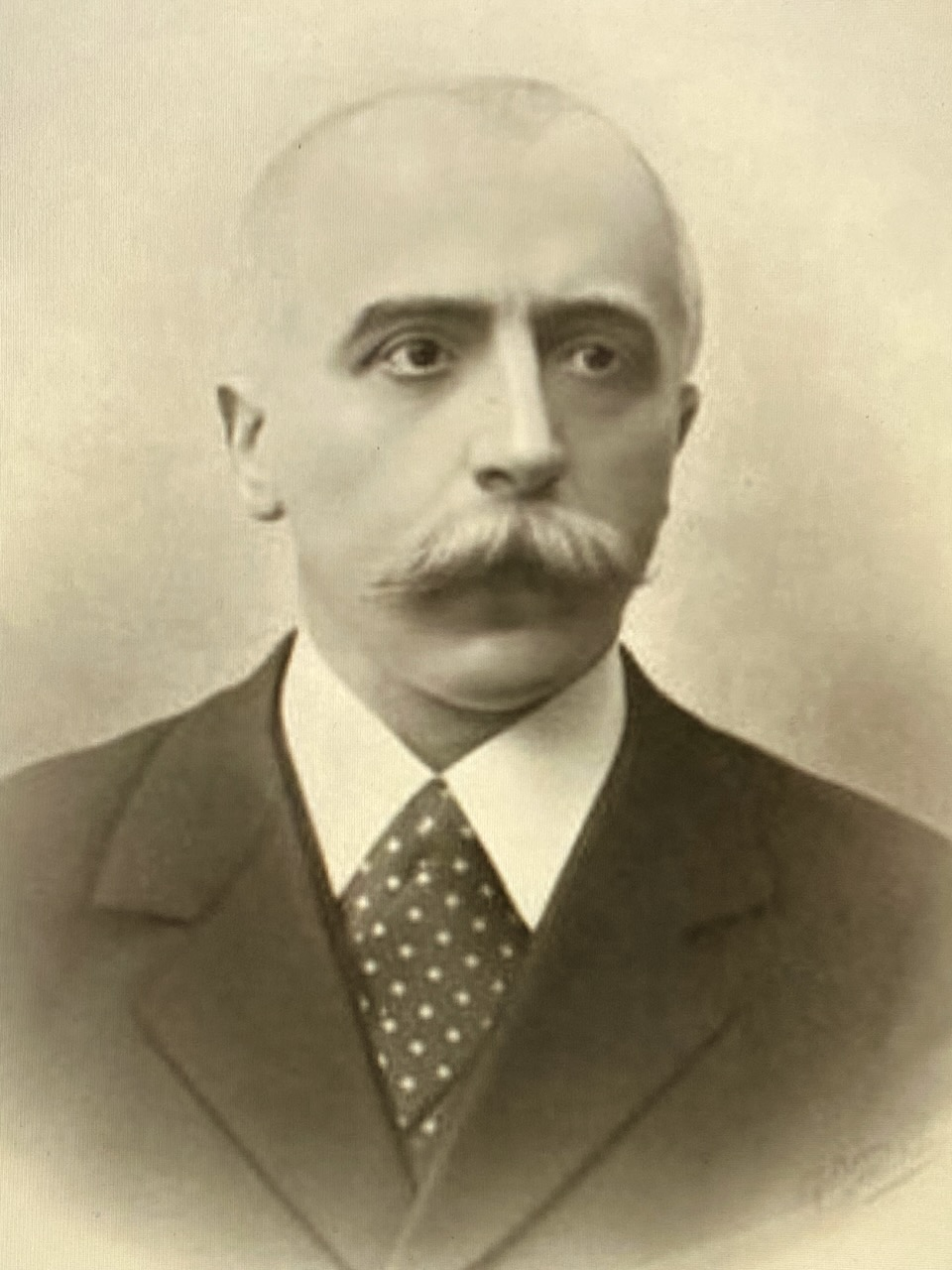
Hendrik Kruys

== Biography ==
Hendrik Kruys was born in Vriezenveen, Overijssel, on 10 December 1851. His father Claas Kruys (1802–1877) was Mayor of Vriezenveen from 1852 to 1870, and a merchant at the firm Jansen, Joost & Co in Saint Petersburg, Russia. His mother was Frederika Bramer (1823–1899), the second wife of his father. Hendrik was a half brother of Gerhardus Kruys, a Dutch vice admiral and minister of Navy. Hendrik's great uncle was Jan Kruys (1767–1830), the first Mayor of Vriezenveen.

== History ==
Hendrik was a member of the ‘Rusluie’, a Dutch community in the city of Saint Petersburg. From 1721 to 1918, Saint Petersburg was the capital of the Russian empire of the tsars.

The Rusluie, mostly traders and merchants, originally came from the town of Vriezenveen in the Netherlands and included members of the Kruys family. The distance between Vriezenveen and Saint Petersburg is about 2,400 kilometres. According to a description in the diary of Hendrik's uncle Jacob Kruys (1812–1852), the journey by covered wagon led through Osnabrück, Berlin and Riga and took 15 days.

Between 1720 and 1917, several hundred people from Vriezenveen lived in Saint Petersburg. Although they formed a tight community with their own customs, most eventually returned home to enjoy their acquired wealth.

== Trading house 'Java' ==
In 1868 Hendrik travelled to the Russian capital via Berlin. He became an apprentice at the Dutch textile company Engberts & Co, trading linnen. In 1884, he started his own trading house ‘Java’ on Grosse Morskaya 38, where he sold Dutch coffee and cocoa, tea, spices, liquor, Delft pottery and other products. In the early days, cacao was not very popular in Russia. Customers visiting Hendrik's store were offered a cup of hot cocoa by his Russian sister-in-law Katarina Awdejewa (1854–1921), the wife of his half-brother Bernardus Kruys (1840–1911).

As cocoa became more popular, his business flourished and Hendrik eventually opened another six specialty shops in the city. He became the sole representative for Blooker's cocoa in the Russian empire. He made many sales trips across European Russia, which he referred to as his 'cacao travels'. At times he covered up to 10.000 kilometres per trip.

In 1890, he married the Dutch Alida Boom (1861–1940) in Vriezenveen. She followed him to the Russian capital. A year later a daughter was born, over the years followed by three sons. All their children were born in Saint Petersburg. In 1897, after the birth of their youngest child, Alida and the children returned to Vriezenveen to live in their newly built villa. Hendrik remained in Russia. He visited his family regularly. In 1903, Alida and Hendrik celebrated their 12 1/2 years wedding, for which he returned to Vriezenveen.

In his diary (archived at the Vriezenveen Historical Museum), Hendrik documented the great fire of Vriezenveen which, on 16 May 1905, destroyed 228 buildings. The fire started in the workshop of carpenter Jannes Goosselink on Oosteinde. A strong easterly wind caused the fire to spread quickly. The townhall and churches also went up in flames. Queen Wilhelmina of the Netherlands and her husband Prince Hendrik visited Vriezenveen and made donations to contribute to the reconstruction of the town.

== Russian revolution ==
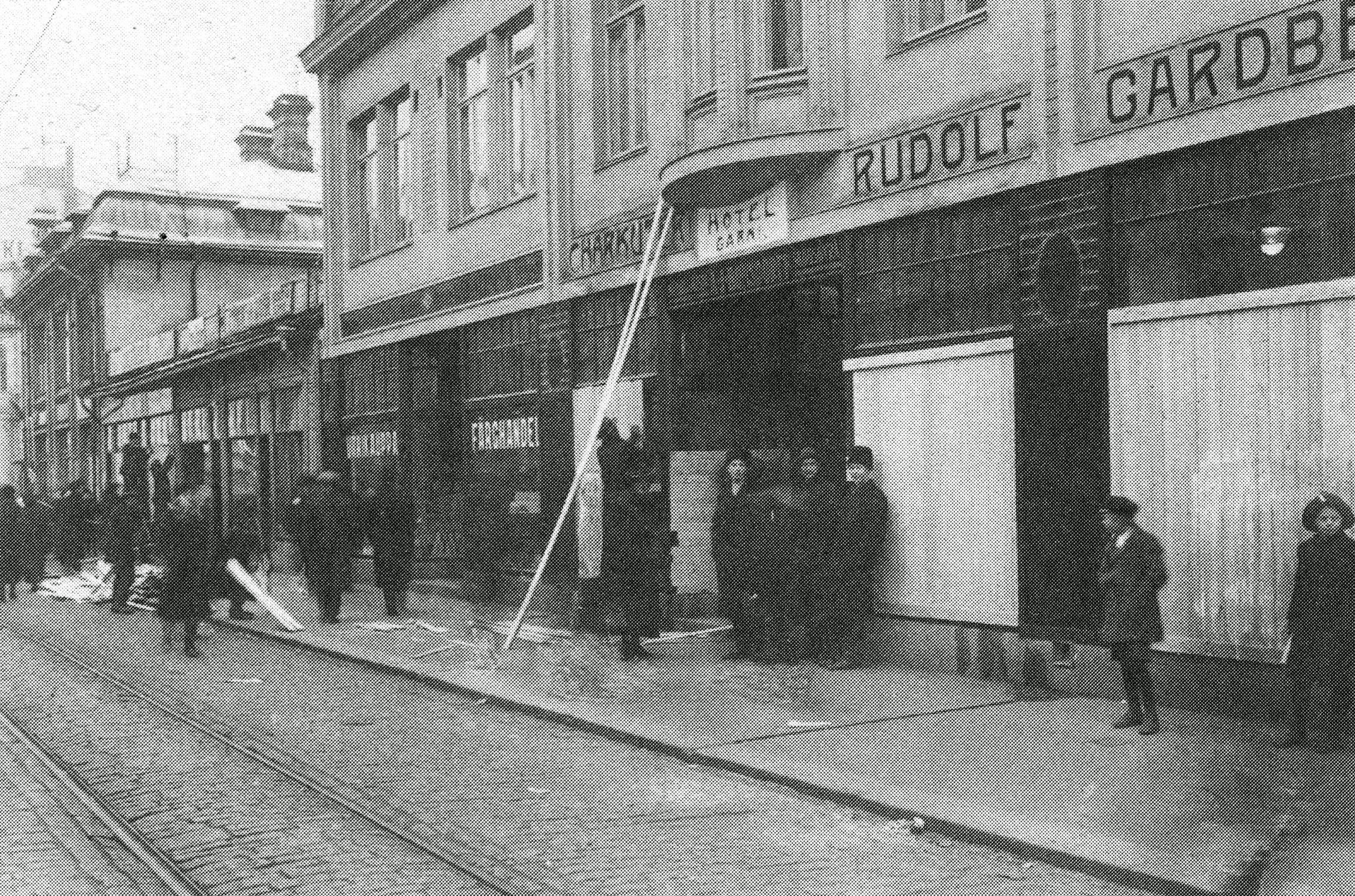
Saint Petersburg storekeepers protect their stores during the revolution (1917).

Hendrik also recorded the first Russian Revolution of 1905 in his diary:

“A lot of commotion in the city and people shot by soldiers. Many shops were looted, but thankfully Java was not damaged.”

As his health deteriorated, Hendrik eventually left Saint Petersburg to join his family in Vriezenveen. In his letters, Hendrik indicated that he had problems with his hands and eyes, causing his handwriting to deteriorate. The business was taken over by Bernardus Kruys.

After the revolution of 1917 the situation in Saint Petersburg worsened. When the bolsheviks came to power, businesses were nationalised, which eventually signalled the end of the Dutch-Russian community.

== Death ==
Hendrik died in Vriezenveen (Oosteinde 59) on 24 May 1907, at the age of 55.
