= Jan Kruys =

Dutch Mayor (1767–1830)

Mayor of Vriezenveen 1825–1830
- Flag of the town of Vriezenveen
- Inaugural holder: Jan Kruys
- Formation: 23 July 1825; 201 years ago

Jan Kruys (Dutch pronunciation: [jɑŋ ˈkrœys]; 1767–1830) was the first mayor of the town of Vriezenveen in the Netherlands. He was also the last magistrate (Dutch: schout) of the town. His detailed diaries spanning the period 1817–1830 have been preserved.

== Biography ==
Jan Kruys was born in Vriezenveen, Overijssel, on 14 July 1767. His father, Claas Jansen Kruys (1731–1802), was a merchant at the firm Kruys, Engberts & Sons, exporting linen and other goods to Hamburg, Frankfurt, Strasbourg and Allicante. His mother was Grietje Otten (1742–1807), daughter of Gerrit Jansen Otten and Jenneken Brouwer.

His great-grandfather Claas Jansen Kruys (1667–1739) was magistrate (Dutch: schout) of Vriezenveen. His brother Johannes Kruys (1769–1806) was deputy magistrate and municipal secretary.

Members of the Kruys family were part of the 'Rusluie', a community of Dutch traders and merchants living in the city of Saint Petersburg in Russia between 1720 and 1917. They originally came from the town of Vriezenveen.

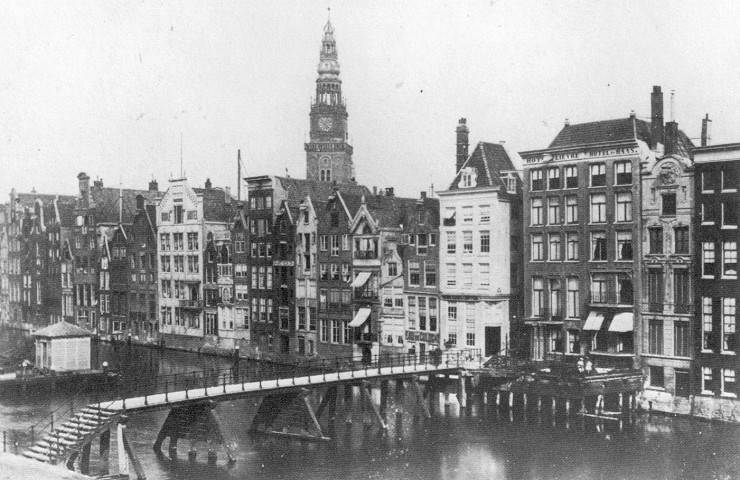
Jan Kruys worked and lived near the Papenbridge (pictured) in Amsterdam.

From 1781 to 1789, Jan and his brother Johannes (1769–1806) worked with their father in the family business in Saint Petersburg. After eight years, Jan left Russia to become office clerk at the Amsterdam trading firm ten Cate en Vollenhove in 1790, where he eventually became bookkeeper. Later he started his own trading business in Amsterdam and lived near the Papenbridge.

Jan married Anna Broers (1772–1793) on 27 January 1793 in Amsterdam. She died during childbirth that same year. He remarried on 28 June 1795 with Maria Johanna Ursinus Grevenstein (1774–1845). In 1799 they returned to Vriezenveen. Maria and Jan had six daughters and five sons.

In 1818 he was appointed magistrate of Vriezenveen by King William I of the Netherlands. From 1825 until his death in 1830 Jan was the first mayor of the town. During the French period, the position of magistrate was abolished and changed to 'maire' or 'meier'. On 23 July 1825, the title was officially changed to Mayor (Dutch: burgemeester) by royal decree.

Jan was grandfather of Vriezenveen resident, Dutch vice admiral and minister of Navy Gerhardus Kruys (1838–1902). His brother's grandson, Hendrik Kruys, (1851–1907) was a successful trader and entrepreneur in Saint Petersburg.

Jan's son Jacob Kruys (1812–1852), who also worked in Russia, recorded a detailed description of the 15-day journey to Saint Petersburg in his diary. The 2,400-kilometer trip took 15 days by covered wagon and led through Osnabrück, Berlin and Riga.

== Diary ==
Between 1817 and 1830, Jan kept a detailed diary. The fourteen books are archived at the Dutch Institute of Military History. Transcriptions and other documents are kept at the historic museum of Vriezenveen.

The books describe the daily life in the town of Vriezenveen at the beginning of the 19th century. Jan documented the Storm Flood of 1825, the worst natural disaster of the 19th century in the Netherlands, as well as the malaria epidemic in Groningen en Friesland and the great fire of the town of Holten.

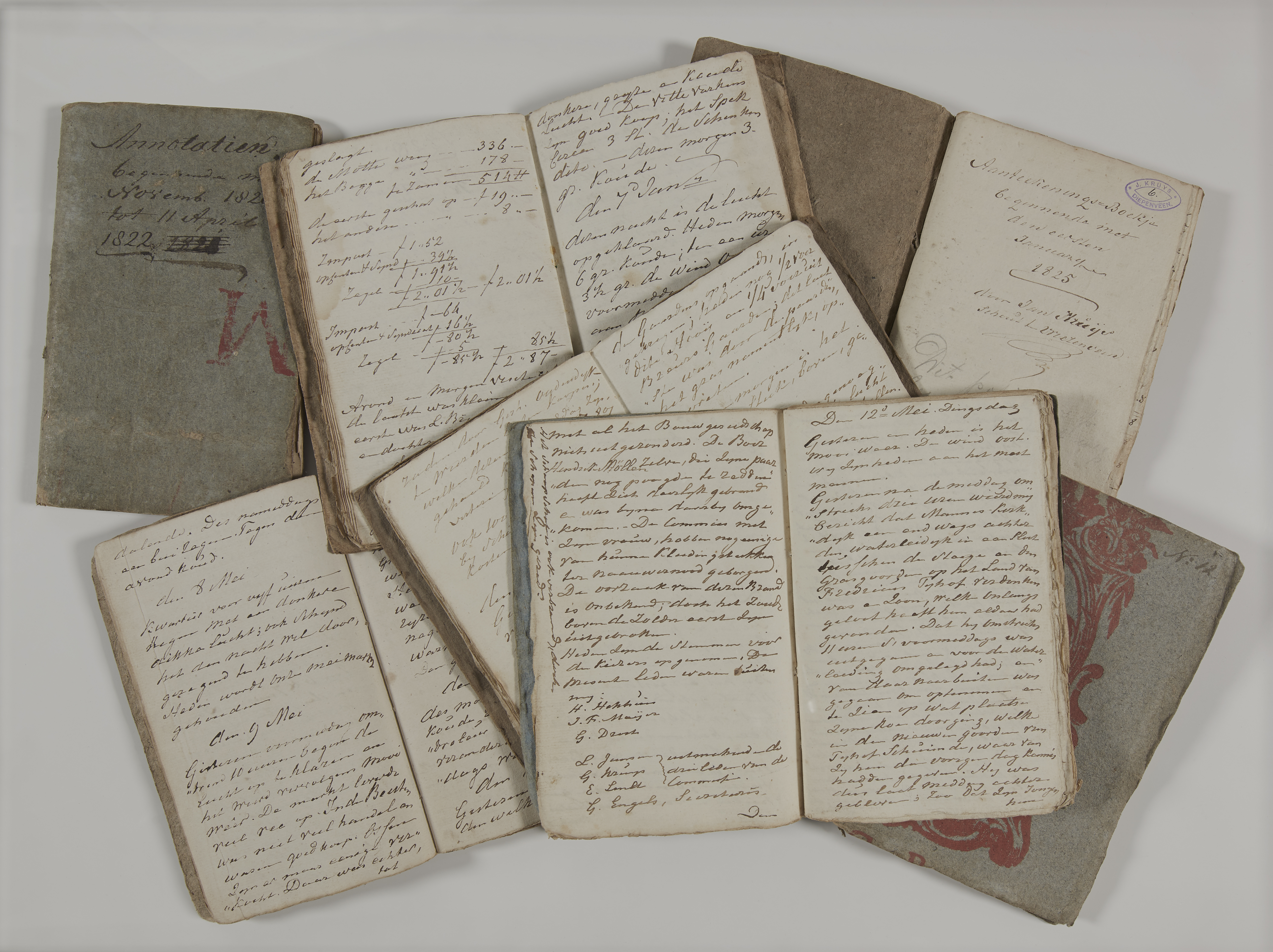
Diary of Jan Kruys (1817-1830)

== Death ==
Jan died in Vriezenveen (Oosteinde 148) on 22 December 1830, at the age of 63.
