= Rusluie =

Dutch community in St. Petersburg, Russia

Regions with significant populations
- Saint Petersburg in the past

Languages
- Low Saxon, Dutch and Russian

Religion
- Dutch Reformed

Related ethnic groups
- Dutch and Frisians
- Lived in Saint Petersburg between 1720 and 1917.

The Rusluie were a community of Dutch origin living in the city of Saint Petersburg in Russia, between 1720 and 1917. They originally came from the town of Vriezenveen, in the Dutch province of Overijssel.

The name Rusluie is in Vriezenveens, a dialect of Twents, and means Ruslui in Dutch (English: Russia Folk/People)

== History ==
The first Vriezenveners to travel to Russia left between 1720 and 1730, and were craftsmen and weavers by trade. Around 1740 more and more Vriezenveners followed their example, but now they were traders who wanted to build a life in the tsar's empire, instead of their predecessors, who only wanted to trade with the Russians. These Merchants from Vriezenveen also formed companies for the trade with Russia, the first members of which were related to each other.

It is not clear how the first Vriezenveners traveled to Saint Petersburg. It is possible that they boarded a ship on the island of Terschelling or in the city of Lübeck. It is also possible that they made the entire journey by land. In any case, the later Vriezenveners travelled to Saint Petersburg by covered wagon, via a long route. This route took them through the Holy Roman Empire (later, after its disbandment, the northern German states), the Polish-Lithuanian Commonwealth and the Russian Empire. The route covered no less than 90 cities on average; these are several of the most notable ones: Bad Bentheim – Osnabrück – Hildesheim – Braunschweig – Magdeburg – Brandenburg an der Havel – Berlin – Küstrin an der Oder – Königsberg – Memel – Riga – Narva – Saint Petersburg. This route took 4 to 6 weeks on average.

After the Napoleonic Wars had concluded in 1815, the travel time from Vriezenveen to Saint Petersburg decreased dramatically. The French Army had, in accordance with Napoleon's strategic views, built roads everywhere in the former Holy Roman Empire, where they had not previously lain (obviously with a military purpose in mind). This wide road network, stretching from West Germany to the Baltics, was instrumental in decreasing the travel time from Vriezenveen to Saint Petersburg, from 6 weeks to 2 weeks.

The journey has been recorded in the Diary of Jan Kruys, the first Mayor of Vriezenveen. On 19 May 1825 he wrote about the departure of one of his sons:

"Yesterday, our son Johannes travelled to St. Petersburg. My wife, Alexander and I brought him to Almelo. (…) Around one thirty they boarded the carriage, and will drive via Ootmarssum, Northoorn etc, with additional post letters to Lubeck, where they are expected to arrive within three days. From there they will board a ship to continue their travels (…)".

Initially, the Vriezenveners traveled back and forth with their goods and found shelter in rather primitive lodgings. Later, it was considered necessary to have permanent places to stay; retail properties were thus bought, including in the "Great Gostiny Dvor" on the Nevsky Prospekt, and houses were bought, housing everyone who worked at the various firms. Whole families now moved with the family head from Vriezenveen to the Russian capital. Nevertheless, people continued to travel back and forth regularly between Vriezenveen and the city of Saint Petersburg. Between 1775 and 1790, large numbers of people began to travel from Vriezenveen to Russia. The new arrivals, often boys of about eleven years of age, were accepted as members of staff in the various firms. The most suitable were appointed as partners after a decade.

Time after time, the immense distance of about 2,400 kilometres was covered, over bumpy and dusty roads to maintain Russian trade contacts and links with the home front. With the rise of the steam train and the steamboat in the 19th century, the land trade route disappeared, and with it the adventurous and often dangerous trips by horse and covered wagon.

Over the years, a few hundred Vriezenveners have lived in Russia. The Vriezenveners formed a tight-knit community there because of the common group interests, the combined journeys, their religion and the mutual family ties. However, it is true that most Vriezenveners eventually returned to their hometown at a later age. They could spend their last days there and enjoy the wealth acquired, in villas they had built for themselves and their families.

Things started to change in the late 19th century. Because of economic hardships experienced, in the then Russian capital, the wealth of the merchants from Vriezenveen started declining. Several businesses, owned by Vriezenveners, had to close. The definitive end came with the outbreak of the Russian Revolution, in 1917. Businesses were nationalized, and most Rusluie thus had to return to their home town of Vriezenveen.

In recent years, an eastern ring road for the town of Vriezenveen has been constructed, dubbed the Rusluieweg (English: Rusluie street). The ringroad was built for the further development of Vriezenveen's southeast area, and is a general reminder to the once wealthy merchants from the same town, of times long gone by.

== Trade goods ==
The most important commodities the Vriezenveners sold were Textiles, but there was also a lively trade in wine, tobacco, tea, cocoa and Flowers. The companies from Vriezenveen and their respective shop premises were not confined to the Great Gostiny Dvor; The firm Ten Cate & Co owned a cigar shop on the corner of the Nevsky Prospekt and Velikaya Morskaya Ulitsa, which was so well known that Tsars Alexander II and III personally came to get their cigars there.

Trader Hendrik Kruys, a well-known member of the Kruys family, owned the Java trading house on Velikaya Morskaya Ulitsa, where coffee, tea, cocoa and Delftware were sold. In addition to being a shop owner, Kruys was also a representative for Blooker's cocoa, and traveled thousands of kilometres through European Russia to sell this precious commodity, previously unknown to the Russians.

The Engberts and Co. brothers could also count the Russian royal court among their clientele. They supplied the Tsars Alexander II and III with fine table linen, some samples of which have been preserved and are present in the Historical Museum of Vriezenveen. The brothers had several buildings in the Great Gostiny Dvor (house numbers 14 to 147), but from 1908 to 1918 only house number 146 remained. In addition, this family also had a drapery shop on the Gribudova Canal, at house number 35, dubbed Maison Bone.

The peak of the trade relations between Vriezenveen and the Russian capital was between the years 1850 and 1870. Some Vriezenveners made an exceptional career in Russia. Jan Hoek and Jan Gerritsen Servijs became purveyors to the Russian royal court and Wicher Berkhoff rose from carpenter's son to director of the Admiralty Shipyard in Saint Petersburg.

Women from Vriezenveen also managed to make a career, such as Aaltje van den Bosch, who founded a sewing school in the Russian capital around the year 1800. The school was so highly regarded that Tsar Paul I and his consort honoured her, with a number of visits.

== Religion ==
The Vriezenveners were not the first Dutchmen to come into contact with Russia. Many had preceded them and, a few of them had founded a Dutch Reformed congregation in Saint Petersburg and had built a church. When the merchants from Vriezenveen no longer returned to their hometown immediately after their business with the Russians had been done, but continued to winter in Saint Petersburg, they became members of the Dutch Reformed Church there. From 1769 onwards, the Vriezenveners took an increasingly important place in the church community and between 1850 and 1890 their presence in the church was so prominent, that people spoke of the Church of the Vriezenveners.

By 1830, the ever-expanding reformed congregation decided to build a new church on the Nevsky Prospekt, house number 20. Four years later, construction was completed and the church was consecrated in the presence of the Dutch king, William I of Orange and his sons, the later kings William II and III. The building consisted of a centre piece, the actual church, and on either side an attached wing, each about 35 meters long, which housed shop premises such as a wine cellar, a cigar shop, a flower shop and textile shops, as well as Living Quarters. Since 2006, in addition to a library, the Friends of Saint Petersburg Foundation (established in Rotterdam) has also been located in the former church building. One of its tasks is to strengthen and reinforce cultural ties between Saint Petersburg and the Netherlands. The available spaces are used for this. This foundation also organizes church services in the building. The foundation also strives to reinstall an old organ in the church, which was used for centuries.

== Popular culture ==
In 2014, the feature film Leerjongen in Petersburg (English: Apprentice in Petersburg) was released. The film is about the adventures of several boys from Vriezenveen who traveled to Saint Petersburg around the year 1870. This was made possible, because the letters the boys had sent to their respective parents were discovered to have survived the ages.
