= Groningen epidemic =

1826 malaria outbreak in Groningen, Netherlands

The Groninger ziekte (also called ‘intermittent fevers’) that broke out in 1826 was a malaria epidemic that killed 2,844 people—nearly 10% of the population of the city of Groningen.

Widespread flooding in Groningen's region during 1825 had created swamp-like conditions. The warm weather during the spring and the summer of 1826 led directly to the epidemic. The city used chlorine to combat the epidemic, becoming the first city to use chlorine for medical treatment. Meanwhile, the epidemic spread to Friesland and the Wadden Sea region.

== Context ==
In February 1825 the dikes broke in several places causing widespread flooding in the region. The decay of plants and cattle under swamp-like conditions and the flooding of the city of Groningen in 1826 in the subsequent hot spring and summer of 1826 led to the epidemic. Sibrandus Stratingh was among those infected and was bedridden for two months, and recommended the use of chlorine (which was recently discovered by that time) to aid with reducing the epidemic. Groningen became the first known city to use chlorine for this purpose.

== Spread to other areas ==
The epidemic also hit Friesland and the German Wadden Sea region. The Frisian town of Sneek reported a tripling of the number of deaths in 1826 as compared to previous years.
