= Vriezenveen =

- Town
- Flag Coat of arms
- Nickname: Vjenne
- Location within Overijssel Location within Netherlands
- Coordinates: 52°25′N 6°38′E
- Country: Netherlands
- Province: Overijssel
- Municipality: Twenterand

Government
  - Body: Municipal council
  - Mayor: Hans Broekhuizen (CDA)

Area
  - Total: 108.14 km^{2} (41.75 sq mi)
  - Land: 106.17 km^{2} (40.99 sq mi)
  - Water: 1.97 km^{2} (0.76 sq mi)
- Elevation: 10 m (33 ft)

Population (January 2021)
  - Total: 13.800
  - Density: 317/km^{2} (820/sq mi)
- Demonym: Vriezenvener
- Time zone: UTC+1 (CET)
  - Summer (DST): UTC+2 (CEST)
- Postcode: 7670–7672
- Area code: 0546
- Website: Official website

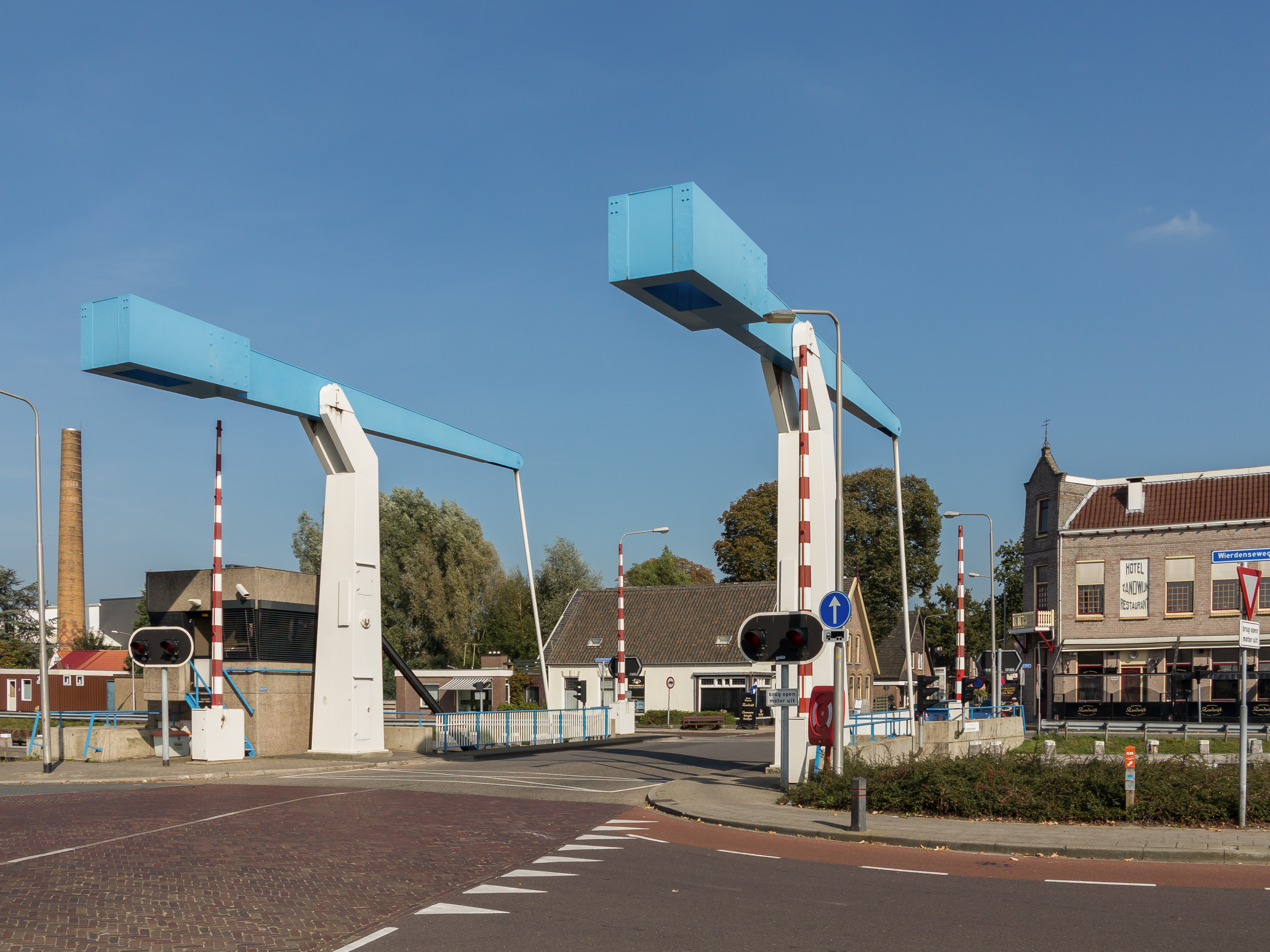
Drawbridge, as seen from the Westerhoeven

Vriezenveen (Lower Saxon: 't Vjenne, Venne, Vjenne, Vreeznven or Vreeinvenne) is a town in the municipality of Twenterand in the Dutch province of Overijssel. The population was 13,800 on January 1, 2020.

Until July 1, 2002, Vriezenveen formed an independent municipality together with the villages of De Pollen, Westerhaar-Vriezenveensewijk, Aadorp and the hamlets Bruinehaar, Weitemanslanden and Westerhoeven. In 2001, the municipality of Vriezenveen was merged with the municipality of Den Ham, which included the villages of Den Ham, Vroomshoop, and Geerdijk. The new municipality was called Vriezenveen and renamed Twenterand in 2003.

The town hall of Twenterand is located in Vriezenveen. The dependence of the town hall in Den Ham was closed on May 30, 2008.

== History ==
The oldest mention of Vriezenveen dates from 1364, when Evert van Hekeren, lord of Almelo, wrote a charter for the free Frisians, their heirs and all the people who lived on the moor, from the Wierdense Weuste to the Bawesbeek. The people who lived on the moor were obliged to pay one bucket of butter a year, measured according to the standard of Zwolle, on St. Martin's Day at Huis Almelo. This concerned a lease of butter and was paid in kind; the lease could not be bought off. The lord of Almelo had allowed the free Frisians to colonize the moor above his land. Almelervene, as Vriezenveen was called before the 15th century, was created from forty farms, roughly stretching from the current Schipsloot to the later excavated canal of Overijssel. Each farm had a width of sixteen fields (16 × 7 is 112 metres). To the east of the settlement, up to the Bawesbeek, an area remained, the so-called Oosterhoeven. This area was not divided and it is rumored that it was possibly the joint property of the residents. To the west of the settlement, there too was a similar area of undivided ground from the Boerstege to the Stouwe. These were the Westerhoeven and Woesten. It is rumored that these lands were also joint property. The Almelervene settlement grew; by the mid-15th century, the village had already changed so much that the various farms were no longer sixteen fields wide, but were reduced to ten, or even eight fields wide.

The German bishop from Münster, Bernhard von Galen, aptly nicknamed Bommen Berend (English: Bombing Bernard), plundered and robbed Twente around the year 1665. Vriezenveen was spared until 1665, because it was surrounded by swamp and bog. There was only one road to Vriezenveen and it was guarded by troops of the Dutch States Army. However, there was a harsh winter in the year 1666, which froze the moors and the surrounding swamp. The road to Vriezenveen lay open and in January 1666, 1500 riders of the bishop's army rode into Vriezenveen. The village was looted and the houses and the church were set on fire. A large number of people were killed and the rest were taken prisoner.

The new Vriezenveen was not rebuilt on the Buterweg, along which it had previously lain. It was instead rebuilt on a sandy road to the north, the present village street. This rebuilding took place at a rapid pace and at the beginning of the 18th century the old Vriezenveen on the Buterweg was a thing of the past. Only the old cemetery of this old Vriezenveen has been preserved. The village is now characterised by a 6.2-kilometer long built-up village street (from west to east: Hammerweg, Westeinde and Oosteinde) with characteristic facades on the houses. The special Engbertsdijksvenen, a partly still living biodiverse raised bog complex with its rare flora and fauna, is a reminder of what the area looked like, before the intensive colonisation of the area by the lord of Almelo and his subjects was set in motion.

Quite a lot is known about the last magistrate (Dutch: Schout) and first Mayor of Vriezenveen, Jan Kruys, because his detailed diaries from the period 1817-1830 have been preserved.

=== Religion ===
During the Reformation, which also permeated Twente, most of the Vriezenveners "switched" to Protestantism. In the 19th century the conservative orthodox Calvinist Protestants became the majority. A Vriezenvener, Jan Machiel Krijger, (1874–1951) took part as a party leader in the 1946 Dutch parliamentary elections on behalf of the Protestant Union. The former CHU member obtained 32,020 votes. To this day most Vriezenveners are either Dutch Reformed or Reformed, as can be seen in their support of the SGP and the predecessors of the ChristenUnie, the RPF and the GPV. However, a strong Catholic minority remained on the eastern side of the village. This Roman Catholic community was able to inaugurate its own parish church in the early 20th century. The church and parish are dedicated to the Roman Catholic saint Anthony the Great.

Until the Second World War, there was a Jewish community in Vriezenveen. In 1878, the Vriezenveen synagogue, Mikdash Me'at (small shrine), was built, after the King's commissioner P.C. Nahuijs, by Royal Decree of December 2, 1876, granted a government subsidy of 850 guilders to the local Israelite Congregation for its construction. The synagogue was completed in 1879. The community then numbered 27 people. In 1906, the Jewish community became part of Almelo, and in 1923, the building was sold. The building is still intact and has been listed as a municipal monument since 1996. The former synagogue has been a warehouse of a private company since 1973, but the building is scheduled to be demolished.

=== Trade ===
The inhabitants of Vriezenveen (Rusluie) had a lively trade with the Russian city of Saint Petersburg in the period from 1720 to 1917. Over the course of time, various companies from Vriezenveen founded trading houses and shops on notable streets and in notable buildings, such as on the Nevsky Prospekt and in the adjacent "Gostiny Dvor". Hendrik Kruys was the owner of trading house 'Java' at Grosse Morskaya 38 in Saint Petersburg. Although they managed to acquire a permanent place in the grand city at the mouth of the Neva, many Vriezenveners eventually returned to their hometown.

On May 16, 1905, there was a great fire in Vriezenveen that almost destroyed the entire town. After the fire, Queen Wilhelmina and Prince Henry – her prince-consort – formally known as Duke Henry of Mecklenburg-Schwerin, personally came to support the residents of Vriezenveen. They made a personal donation of no less than a thousand guilders, intended for the reconstruction of Vriezenveen. The fire was commemorated in 2005, with a parade of historic fire-fighting vehicles.

The Jansen & Tilanus company was spared during the great fire. The textile factory was the largest employer in the town at the time and the fire ended just before the factory on the Westeinde street. Due to the dryness of the commonly used thatched roofs and the strong winds from the east, there was no stopping the fire. 228 houses, mostly built in the aforementioned style, went up in flames. The richer farms and Rusluie houses made of brick and with greater garden distance from other houses, turned out to be more resistant to the fire and still stand to this day. The most famous of these still-standing farms, is the Peddemors farm. The Historical Museum deals with the history of the municipality of Vriezenveen, and of the town itself. There is, among other things, a historical department about the textile history of Vriezenveen and extensive documentation about the great fire of 1905. In addition, an old living room, a farmhouse kitchen and a school class from long ago are on display, which allows people to get a glimpse of life in the past.

During the Second World War, Vriezenveen became the temporary home of many children from Rotterdam. Contact was made through the Roman Catholic pastor of Vriezenveen, dhr. Van Rhijn – originally from Rotterdam – and the children were taken care of in Vriezenveen's foster families. On May 1, 2004, the association Oud Vriezenveen organized a reunion where about a hundred so-called oorlogskinderen (English: war children) – mostly from Rotterdam – gathered. The war children, at the time referred to as bleekneusjes (English: pale noses), were asked to put their stories on paper, which resulted in the book Bleekneusjes oorlogskinderen. In April 2006, the first copy of this book was presented to deputy Gert Ranter by initiator José Bosch-Höfte, with great interest from many war children.

Up until the 1960s, the village did not have elder care, because of a "strong general regional sense of commitment and duty towards helping each other", also known as noaberschap (English: neighbour-ship).On December 23, 1960, the Protestant-Christian Foundation De Vriezenhof was founded. The construction of the retirement home then took five years, on the site where a rectory stood before.

== Points of interest ==
=== Museums ===
- Historisch Museum Vriezenveen (English: Historical Museum of Vriezenveen)
- Kachelmuseum Fini's Hoeve (English: Stove Museum "Fini's Homestead")

=== Monuments and buildings ===
- Leemansmolen (English: Leemans' Mill)
- Gemeentehuis Twenterand (English: Town Hall of Twenterand)
- Watertoren Vriezenveen (English: Water Tower of Vriezenveen)
- Grote Kerk (English: Large Church)

== Sports and leisure ==
Vriezenveen has two football clubs, DOS '37 (Door Oevening Sterk) and DETO (Door Eendracht Tot Overwinning). There is also the korfball/netball club Amicitia, basketball club Peatminers, volleyball club Vrivo, swimming and water polo club VZPC, athletics association AV Twenterand, shooting association SV Vriezenveen, tennis club TCV, ice skating club Centrale Schaatstraining Vriezenveen and skating club De Eendracht Vriezenveen, chess association Vrimot, gym association KEV (Kracht En Vriendschap), judo association Judokwai Vriezenveen, tug-of-war club TTV Vriezenveen, and the scouting association Admiraal Kruys.

Vriezenveen has two natural ice rinks. One of them is located on the Geesterenseweg and owned by IJsclub de Eendracht. The other ice rink is located at the sports park in Vriezenveen and is owned by IJsclub Vooruit.

The foundation Sportpromotie Twenterand organizes the Twenterandrun once a year and the Nacht van Twenterand once a year. The Twenterandrun is a semi-professional running race, described as the "Van Dam tot Dam run" – the biggest yearly running race of Amsterdam and the surrounding regions – of the east. In 2002 the running competition was organized for the first time and in 2007 the first lustrum was celebrated with a performance by singer Jannes.

Up to and including 2006, a cycling tour was held every year under the name Ronde van Vriezenveen. Due to limited interest and the very unfavorable location of the course, this Ronde van Vriezenveen has been changed into an ATB couple race through the centre of Vriezenveen and continued under the name "Nacht van Twenterand". This race is also organized by the foundation Sportpromotie Twenterand

There is also a harmony orchestra that has won the national championship several times, the Vriezenveense Harmonie. For further relaxation there is the Herman Jansen-Park.

Once a year there is a fair. There is also a market every Wednesday morning. The last Wednesday of the summer holiday, a farmers market is organized which always attracts thousands of visitors. In recent years, local entrepreneurs (mainly catering establishments) have been trying to attract more and more people to Vriezenveen by organizing various activities. The best example of this is the yearly festival, Randrock, which attracts thousands of visitors and is a huge boon to local entrepreneurs.

== Traffic and transport ==
Vriezenveen is located on the National Road 36 (N36) from Hardenberg to Almelo and Wierden. The train station on the route Almelo – Mariënberg is located in the west of the village. It is served twice an hour by Arriva with trains of the LINT type in the Blauwnet/Vechtdallijnen style.

The main bus line is Line 83 from Almelo to the bus station "Nieuwe Daarlerveenseweg", in Vriezenveen. This route is driven by Syntus, in Twents-style. In addition, Line 81 runs through Vriezenveen via the bus station in Westerhaar to Ommen and towards Almelo. Since April 1, 2007, residents can also use the regional taxi.

== Language ==
A unique dialectical variant of the Lower Saxon language group is spoken in Vriezenveen, albeit to a decreasing degree; aptly named Vriezenveens (Lower Saxon: Vjeans). In terms of pronunciation, this is less like the surrounding Twents, although grammatically and lexically it draws from the same source.

=== History ===
Some sources claim that Frisian influences can be heard in Vjeans. This seems plausible, because Vriezenveen was founded by Frisians. Other sources claim that the unique Vjeanse pronunciation is due to the Rusluie. These tradesmen from Vriezenveen settled in Saint Petersburg, Russia, but usually returned to Vriezenveen years later. In Saint Petersburg they formed a tight-knit community of several hundred people, who most likely spoke to each other in Vjeans. A strong Russian influence on the Vjeans of those who stayed behind therefore seems less plausible.

Because Twente was more or less cut off from the rest of the Netherlands by the moorland for centuries, links were created with Westphalia and the adjacent Münsterland. The large city of Münster was looked at for the latest fashion and customs. The language in Münster (Westphalian) was also seen as the standard and the whole of Twente (including Vriezenveen) went along with this. A characteristic feature of Westphalian is the Vowel breaking, which makes an open ee, oo and eu sound like a "twisted" ieje, oewe and uje. "Weten" became "wiëten", "Koken" became "koëken" and "Lui/Leu" became "luje". This rotation can also be heard clearly in the spoken Low Saxon variants of Rijssens and Enters. However, Vjeans seems to have gone even a step further in this, so that "Wiëten" now sounds like "wjetn/wjet'n" and "Koëken" like "kwakn/kwak'n". (English: Weten – Knowing / Koken – Cooking / Lui|Leu – Folk)

=== Preservation ===
In 2014, four stories from the children's book series Jip en Janneke were translated into Vjeans and included in "Jipke en Jannöaken", the translation of this children's book series into Twents. Other than that though, other attempts to preserve the "real" Vjeans seem to be limited to the attempts of local linguists or local historical societies.

In 1969, the "Woordenboek van het Vriezenveens, deel 1" (English: Dictionary of Vriezenveens, part 1), was written by Dr. Hendrik Entjes. Additional parts have since not appeared further.

== Notable residents ==
- Wicher Berkhoff (Russian: Vasili Ivanovich Berkov, English: Vasily Berkov (1794–1870)), shipbuilder and translator
- Manon Fokke (1976), politician
- Maayke Heuver (1990), football player
- Michel Jansen (1966), football player
- Johan Kenkhuis (1980), swimmer
- Gerhardus Kruys (1838–1902), Dutch vice-admiral and minister of the Navy
- Hendrik Kruys (1851-1907), trader and entrepreneur in Saint Petersburg
- Jan Kruys (1767-1830), first mayor of Vriezenveen
- Gerben Löwik (1977), cyclist
- Jessica Torny (1980), football player

== Literature and sources ==
- Plegt, B.H.A.M., e.a. (red.) (1961). Jaarboek Twente 1962. Stichting Jaarboek voor Twente, Enschede. Jrg.1(1961). ISSN 1566-3744.
- Entjes, H. (1969). Woordenboek van het Vriezenveens : deel 1. Sasland, Groningen. 124 p. Niet verder verschenen.
- Entjes, H. (1970). Omme sonderlinge lieve toe den vene : uit de geschiedenis en het volksleven van Vriezenveen / bijdr.: Everhard Jans; foto's: Joop Lamberts. Kruseman, Den Haag. 142 p., 26 p. pl. (Stad en dorp; dl. 9). Omslagtitel: Over geschiedenis en volksleven van Vriezenveen.
- Abbink, H.J., B.G. Coes, T. Jansen-Bramer e.a. (1980). Oorlog, verzet, bevrijding, 1940–1945. Vriezenveen. 24 p. Tentoonstelling in de Middenschool in Vriezenveen.
- Hosmar, Johan (1982). De "Middenschool" van Vriezenveen. Uit: Jaarboek Twente, jrg.21(1982)p.61-66. ISSN 1566-3744.
- Jansen Dzn., H. & F. Boswinkel Sr. (red.) (1982). Enige werken van Bernard Jaspers Faijer te Vriezenveen, schilder der historie van zijn geboortedorp / foto's: C. Alberts e.a.; voorw.: C. van der Wolf. Boswinkel, Vriezenveen. 128 p. Omslagtitel: De verkregen gave van de Vriezenveense kunstschilder Bernard Jaspers-Faijer.
- Berkhof, H. & J. Schipper (1983). De hervormde zuil in Vriezenveen, 1945–1983 : referaat in het kader van het kandidatencollege 'verzuiling en ontzuiling'. Groningen. 56 p.
- Berkhof, Erik (= H.). (1986). Vriezenveen 1832–1876 : een kadastraal onderzoek naar de sociale structuur in Vriezenveen. III, 146 p. Doctoraalscriptie R.U. Groningen.
- Schotman, J. (1986). Vijftig jaar christelijk onderwijs in Vriezenveen (1884–1934). 58 p. Scriptie.
- Boonstra, H. (1988). Gedenkboek ter gelegenheid van het 150-jarig bestaan van de gereformeerde kerk in Vriezenveen. 235 p.
- Venema, Peter (editor) e.a. (1988). Jaarboek Twente 1989. Stichting Jaarboek voor Twente, Enschede. Jrg.28(1988). 144 p. ISSN 1566-3744. Over Vriezenveen.
- (1990). Inventarisatie jongere bouwkunst 1850 – 1940 : beschrijving gemeente Vriezenveen. Het Oversticht, Zwolle. 45 p.
- Hosmar, Johan (1992). Vriezenveen in het verleden. Van de Berg, Enschede. 186 p. ISBN 90-70986-80-9.
- Witte, Gerrit de (1996). Verhalen over Vriezenveen, 1872. Vriezenveen. 66 p.
- Jansen, Herman (1999). Ken uw dorp en heb het lief ... / samenstellers: F.D. Boswinkel e.a. Stichting 'Ken Uw dorp', Vriezenveen. 320 p. ISBN 90-9012824-7. Artikelen uit de De Vriezenveense Courant, 1945–1954.
- Hosmar, Johan (2001). Vrouwenkiesrecht stuitte in Vriezenveen op heftig verzet. Uit: Jaarboek Twente, jrg.40(2001)p. 92-96. ISSN 1566-3744.
- (2001). Oet de tied : begrafenisgebruiken in het oude Vriezenveen. Uit: Traditie : tijdschrift over tradities en trends, jrg.7(2001)nr.4, p. 14-16. ISSN 1382-4104.
- Hosmar, Johan (2002). Vriezenveen zo het reilde en zeilde. Van de Berg, Enschede. 112 p. ISBN 90-5512-156-8.
- Harzevoort, Jan (red.) (2003). Naamsaanneming in Vriezenveen, 1812 en 1826. Harzevoort, Almelo. 90 p.
- Boonstra, H. (2005). Grote brand Vriezenveen en de geschiedenis van de Vriezenveense brandweer / samenstellers: H.J. Bramer-Jansen e.a. Stichting 'Grote Brand Vriezenveen 1905–2005', Vriezenveen. 192 p.
- Bosch-Höfte, José e.a. (red.) (2006). Bleekneusjes oorlogskinderen : verhalen van oorlogskinderen van toen en nu. Vereniging Oud Vriezenveen/War Child Nederland, Vriezenveen/Amsterdam. 95 p. Geen ISBN.
- Boonstra, H. (red.) (2006). Het spoorboek van Vriezenveen : 100 jaar geschiedenis van het lokaalspoor en de overige Vriezenveense sporen : 1906–2006. Vereniging Oud Vriezenveen, Vriezenveen. 228 p.
- Wullink, Henk (2008). Eeuwenoude Hanzeroute op de fiets : van St.Petersburg naar Vriezenveen / met medew. van Jan Peter Ooms en Reinier Masselink. Eigen uitg. Henk Wullink. 280, 8 p. Verslag van de nagefietse tocht van een koetstocht uit 1826.
- Kobes Wzn, B. (2009). Vriezenveen in oude ansichten : deel 1. Europese Bibliotheek, Zaltbommel. 44 p. ISBN 978-90-288-1686-2. (Toen boekje), speciaal uitg. voor het AD. Reprod. van een gedeelte van de uitg. uit 1972 (80 p.).
- Kobes, Hans J. (red.) (2010–2013). Winkels van weleer. Stichting Peddemorsboerderij, Vriezenveen. 4 dln à 96 p., foto's. Op omslag: Vriezenveen & Westerhaar-Vriezenveensewijk.

== Gallery ==
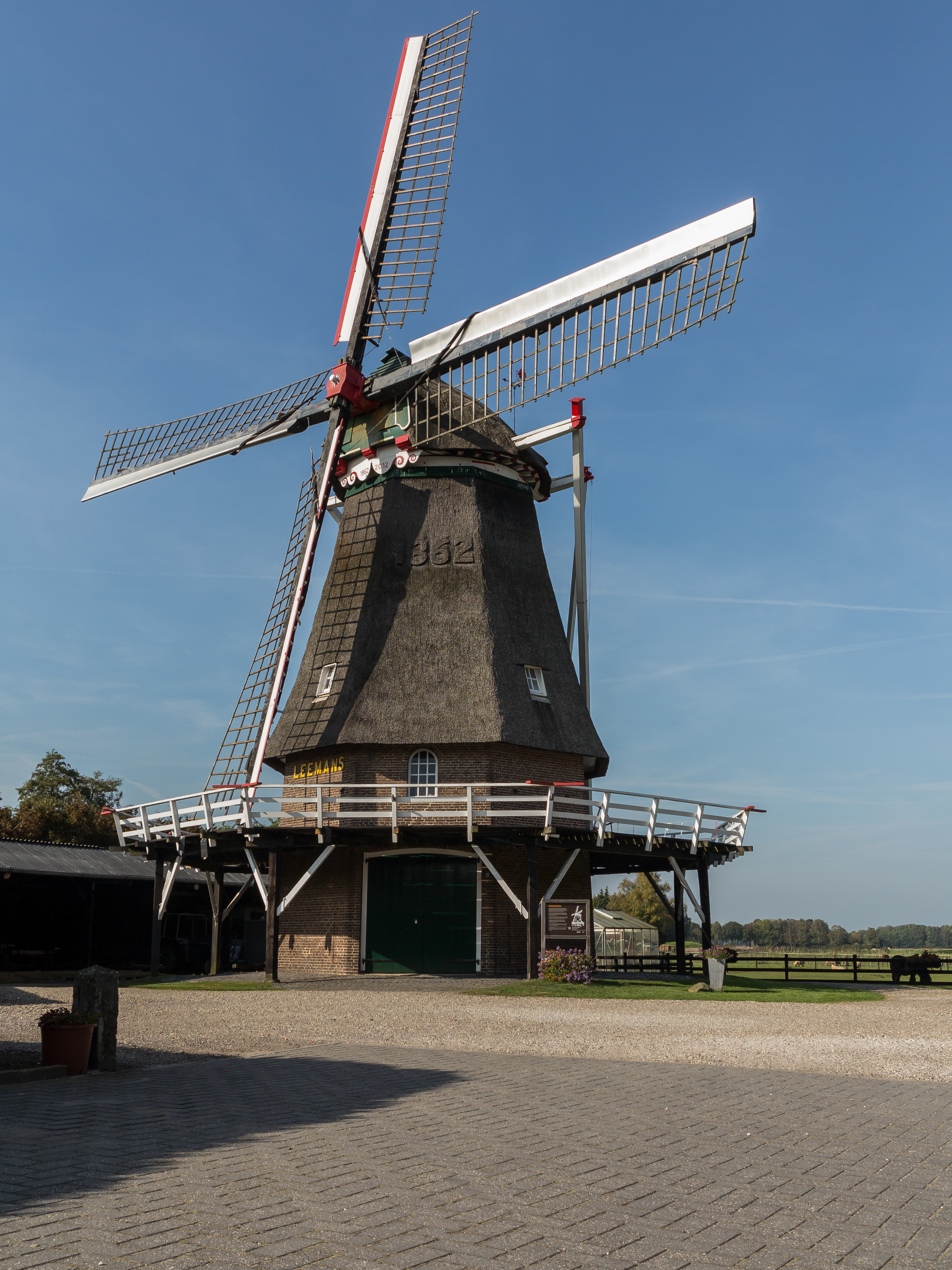
Windmill: de Leemansmolen

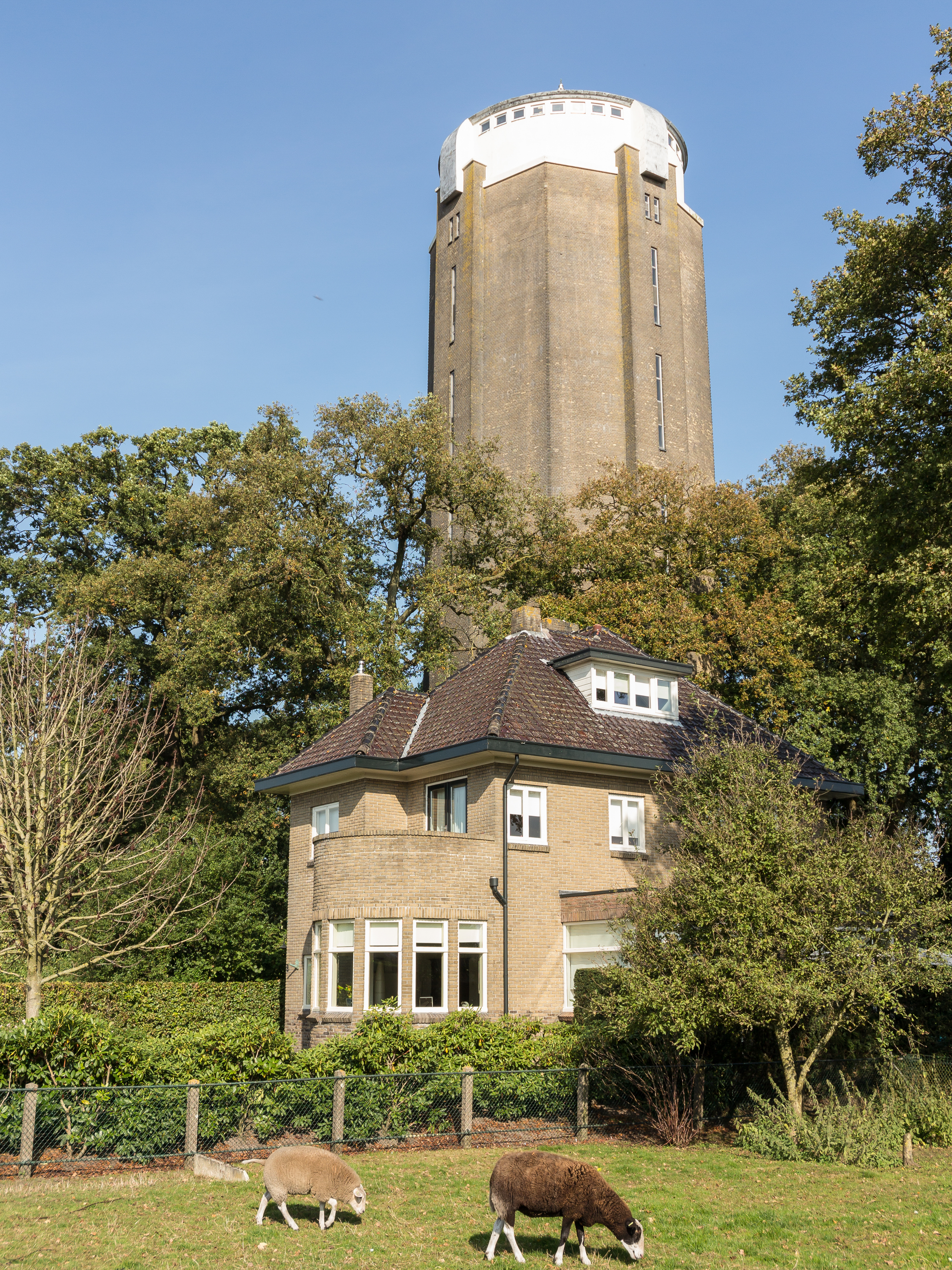
Water tower
