= Huwyler =

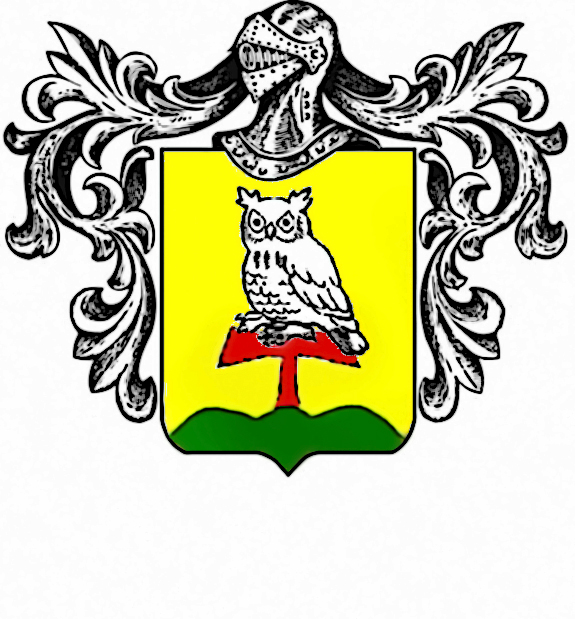
Huwyler coat of arms

Huwyler is a surname originating from Upper Swabia (Ober-Aargau) in the Middle Ages, connecting the region between the current Bavaria and Swiss-German cantons. This surname is still recognized as linked to the Swiss central region (Zurich, Zug and Lucerne) with roots in the cities of Risch and Steinhausen.

Huwyler is a topographic surname from the Huwyl castle and hamlet located between Römerswil and Hochdorf, Lucerne around the 15th century. The Huwyl area was named as Hunwil in documents dating from 1230 to 1474. The surname started from the Lords von Hunwil (Herren von Hunwil, Giswil OW). The von Hunwil surname is well documented as they were ministerialis barons. The expulsion of the von Hunwil family in 1382 is the catalyst for the surname's formation. When the noble family was overthrown and their lands were dispersed, the name "Hunwil" remained attached to the territory. In the 15th and 16th centuries, Swiss surnames were derived by appending the syllable –er. This largely replaced the practice of using the "von" prefix. The surname von Hunwil evolved over the years to Huwiler and Huwyler (and even Hauviller in France).

== People ==
- Beat Huwyler (born 1961), Swiss theologian
- Burkard Huwiler (1868–1954), Swiss Roman Catholic bishop
- Daniel Huwyler (born 1963), Swiss cyclist
- Friedrich Huwyler (1942–2009), Swiss politician
- Heidrun Huwyler (born 1942), Swiss German impressionist painter
- Jakob Huwyler (1867–1938), Swiss artist
- Jost Franz Huwyler-Boller (1874–1930), Swiss architect
- Max Huwyler (1931–2023), Swiss writer
- Mike Huwiler (born 1972), American soccer player

== Other uses ==
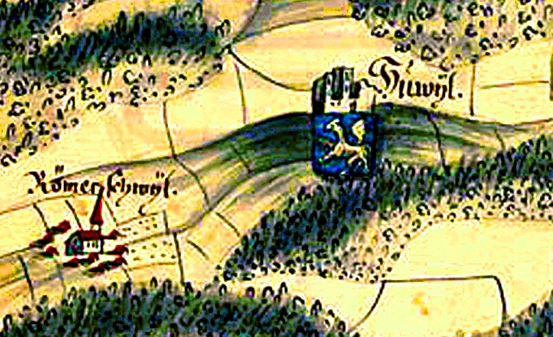
Huwyl Burg

- Huwiler Tower, Zug, Switzerland
- Huwyl, a hamlet near Hochdorf, Lucerne, Switzerland
- Huwyl Burg, a castle near Römerswil, Switzerland

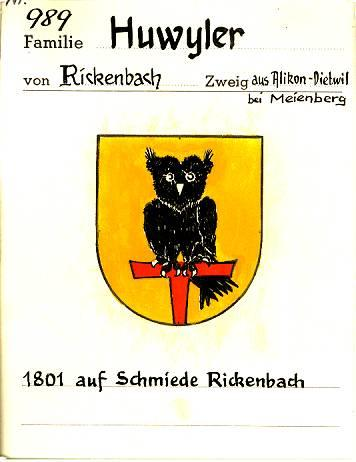
Lucern State Registry
