= List of people from Lucerne =

Lucerne in central Switzerland is the capital of the canton of Lucerne and part of the district of Lucerne. With a population of about 81,057 people (as of 2013), it is the most populous town in Central Switzerland. Notable people associated with Lucerne include:

== Politicians and others ==
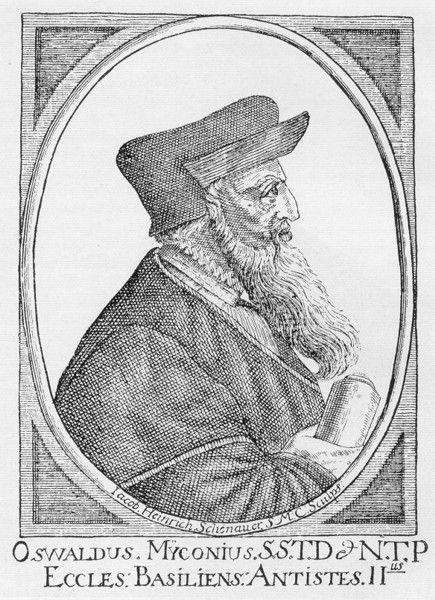
Oswald Myconius

- Hans Urs von Balthasar (1905-1988), theologian
- Alphons Egli (1924-2016), politician
- Thelma Furness, Viscountess Furness (1904-1970), American socialite
- Felix Gmür (born 1966), theologian and bishop of Basel
- Petermann von Gundoldingen (? -1386), Schultheiss, participant in the battle near Sempach
- Josef Martin Knüsel (1813-1889), politician and jurist
- Gloria Morgan-Vanderbilt (1904-1965), American socialite
- Anton Muheim (1916-2016), Social Democrat politician, President of the National Council
- Oswald Myconius (1488-1552), reformer
- Franz Riedweg (1907-2005), doctor and SS Obersturmbannführer
- Melchior Russ (c. 1450-1499), historian
- Anna Maria Rüttimann-Meyer von Schauensee (1772-1856), politically influential Swiss salonist
- Judith Schmutz (born 1996), politician
- Josef Anton Schobinger (1849-1911), politician and builder
- Marcel Schwerzmann (born 1965), politician

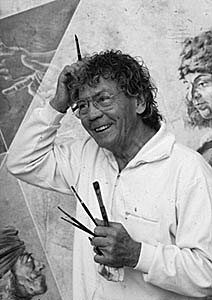
Hans Erni, 1967

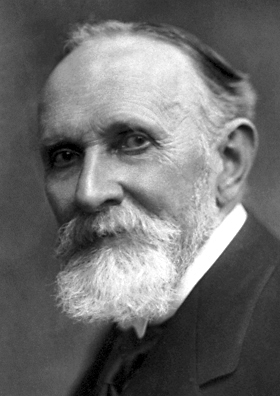
Carl Spitteler Nobel laureate 1919

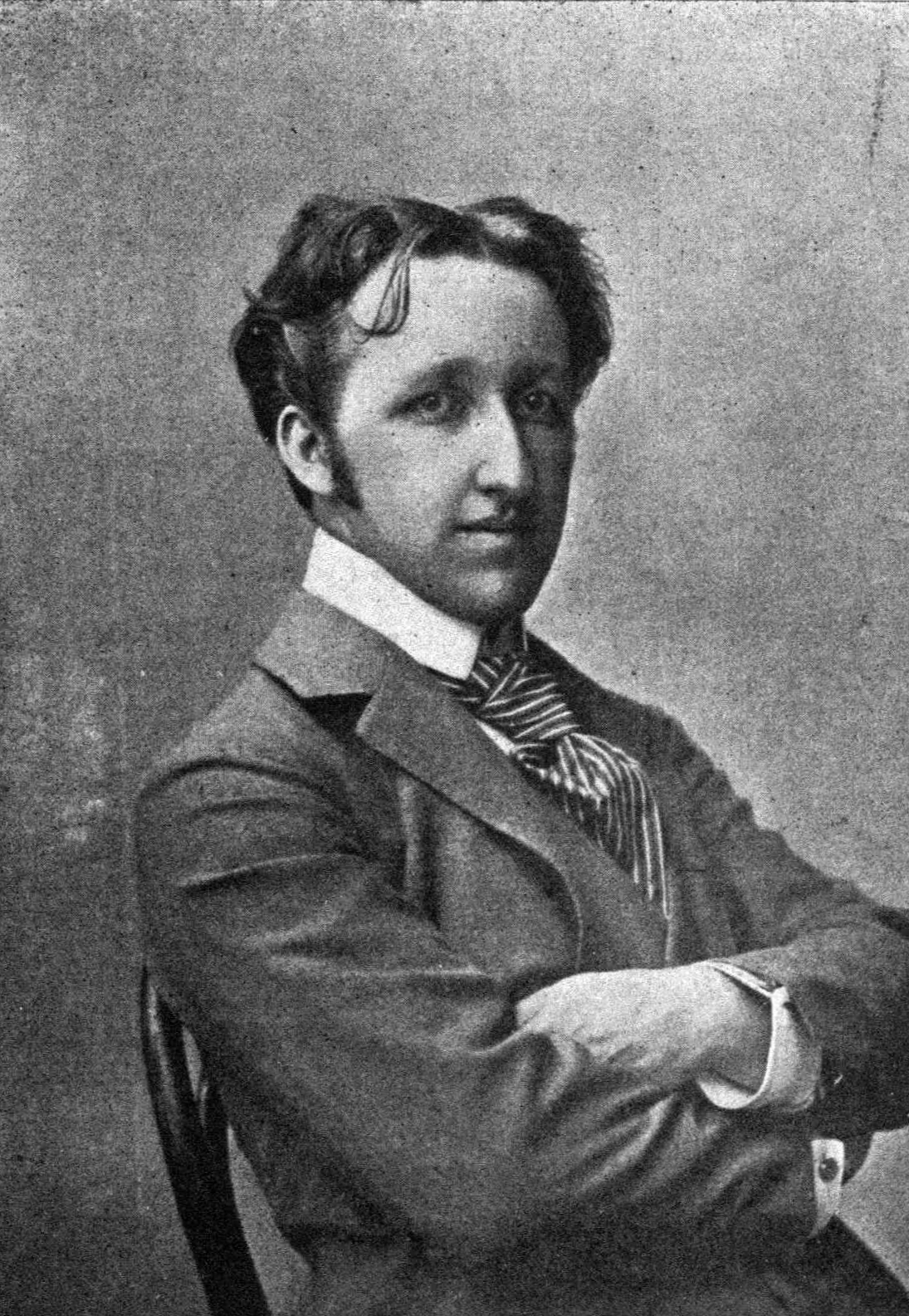
Siegfried Wagner, 1896

== Arts ==
- Manon Bannerman (born 2002), singer and model
- Peter Bichsel (1935–2025), writer
- Rolf Brem (1926-2014), sculptor, draftsman and graphic artist
- Fritz Brun (1878-1959), composer and conductor
- Heidi Brunner (born 1961), opera singer
- Caspar Diethelm (1926-1997), composer
- Rolf Dobelli (born 1966), writer and entrepreneur
- Jolanda Egger (born 1960), actress, beauty queen, model and racing driver
- Hans Erni (1909-2015), painter, graphic artist and sculptor
- Herbert Ernst Groh (1906-1982), tenor
- Ernst Hodel junior (1881-1955), painter
- Thomas Imbach (born 1962), filmmaker
- Armin Jordan (1932-2006), conductor
- Stephan Klapproth, (born 1958), journalist and television presenter
- Michael Koch (born 1982), film director and screenwriter
- Urs Leimgruber (born 1952), saxophonist
- Edith Mathis (1938-2025), soprano and university professor
- Max von Moos (1903-1979), painter and graphic artist
- Mauro Peter (born 1987), opera singer
- Robert Pilchowski (1909-1990), writer
- Carl Spitteler (1845-1924), writer and Nobel laureate (died in Lucerne)
- Andrea Štaka (born 1973), director and screenwriter
- Emil Steinberger (born 1933), cabaret artist, writer, director and actor
- Fredy Studer (born 1948), drummer
- André Thomkins (1930-1985), painter, draftsman and poet
- Siegfried Wagner (1869-1930), German composer, librettist and conductor
- Robert Wuellner (1885-1966), actor, director and filmproducer
- Luzia von Wyl (born 1985), jazz pianist and composer
- Loredana Zefi (born 1995), rapper
- Robert Zünd (1826-1909), painter

== Science and business ==
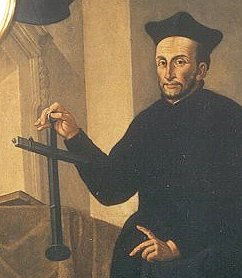
Johann Baptist Cysat

- Markus Breitschmid (born 1966), architectural theorist and architectural historian
- Johann Baptist Cysat (1585-1657), mathematician and astronomer
- Edgar Gretener (1902-1958), electrical engineer
- Toni Hagen (1917-2003), geologist
- Josef-Maria Jauch (1914-1974), theoretical physicist
- Peter von Matt (1937–2025), philologist, specialist for German studies, author
- Stanislaus von Moos (born 1940), art historian and architectural theorist
- Walter von Moos (1918-2016), industrialist
- Michael Pieper (born 1946), billionaire businessman

== Sport ==
- Hippolyt Kempf (born 1965), Olympia gold medal winner (Nordic combined)
- Yannick Mettler (born 1989), racing driver
- Kurt Müller (born 1948), footballer, 38 caps for Switzerland
- Karl Odermatt (born 1942), footballer, 50 caps for Switzerland
- Lara Stalder (born 1994), ice hockey player
- Claudio Castagnoli (born 1980), professional wrestler
