= Stämpfli =

Stämpfli, or Stampfli, can refer to:

== People ==
- Carla Stampfli (born 1984), Swiss swimmer and triathlete
- Fabienne Stämpfli (born 1992), Swiss politician
- Jakob Stämpfli (1820–1879), Swiss politician
- Jakob Stämpfli (bass) (1934–2014), Swiss concert singer and vocal teacher
- Regula Stämpfli (born 1962), Swiss-born political scientist
- Robert Stämpfli (1914–2002), Swiss researcher who developed the sucrose gap technique
- Rudolf Stämpfli (born 1955), Swiss graphic arts entrepreneur and publisher
- Salomé Stampfli (born 2005), Liechtensteiner footballer
- Walther Stampfli (1884–1965), Swiss politician

== Companies ==
- Stämpfli (publisher), a Swiss graphic arts company and publisher
- Stämpfli Racing Boats, a British-based manufacturer of rowing boats
