= Herlisberg =

Former municipality, canton of Lucerne

- Former municipality
- Ruins of Oberrinach Castle
- Location of Herlisberg
- Location within Switzerland Location within Canton of Lucerne
- Coordinates: 47.198°N 8.2301°E
- Country: Switzerland
- Canton: Lucerne
- District: Hochdorf
- Municipality: Römerswil

Population (2000)
  - Total: 239
- Time zone: UTC+01:00 (CET)
  - Summer (DST): UTC+02:00 (CEST)
- SFOS number: 1029
- ISO 3166 code: CH-LU
- Website: Profile (in German),

Herlisberg is a former municipality in the Hochdorf district of the canton of Lucerne, Switzerland. Since 2005 it has been part of the municipality of Römerswil. It lies on the Erlosen above Lake Baldegg and comprised the hamlets of Herlisberg, Oberrinach and Laufenberg.

== History ==
Herlisberg is first mentioned in 1173 as Heigesperhc and in 1242 as Hergesberch. The well-preserved ruins of Oberrinach Castle stand near Herlisberg. The castle was built in the 13th century by what was presumably the younger branch of the lords of Rinach, who held substantial estates in Herlisberg. The Lucerners destroyed it in the Sempach War, and it was not rebuilt afterwards. In 1849 the Alsatian Reinach-Hirzbach family, descendants of the lords of Rinach, acquired the ruins.

Herlisberg belonged to the bailiwick (Amt) of Richensee-Hitzkirch, came to the Freie Ämter in 1425 and to Lucerne in 1803. Until the change to Römerswil in 1946–1947, the greater part of Herlisberg belonged to the parish of Hitzkirch. From the 16th to the 18th century there was a hermitage (Waldbruderhaus) on the Erlosen. The chapel dates from 1838 and was probably built over an earlier building. At the end of the 18th century there was no communal land in Herlisberg, and therefore no entry tax (Einzugssteuer) for newcomers either. In 1822 the boundary with Gunzwil, Neudorf and Römerswil was adjusted. Herlisberg formed a joint school district with Retschwil.

Herlisberg had 217 inhabitants in 1798, 262 in 1850, 192 in 1900, 187 in 1950 and 239 in 2000.

== Bibliography ==
- Die Kunstdenkmäler des Kantons Luzern, vol. 6, 1963, pp. 92–94
