= Moos family =

Swiss noble family

von Moos
- Patrician family
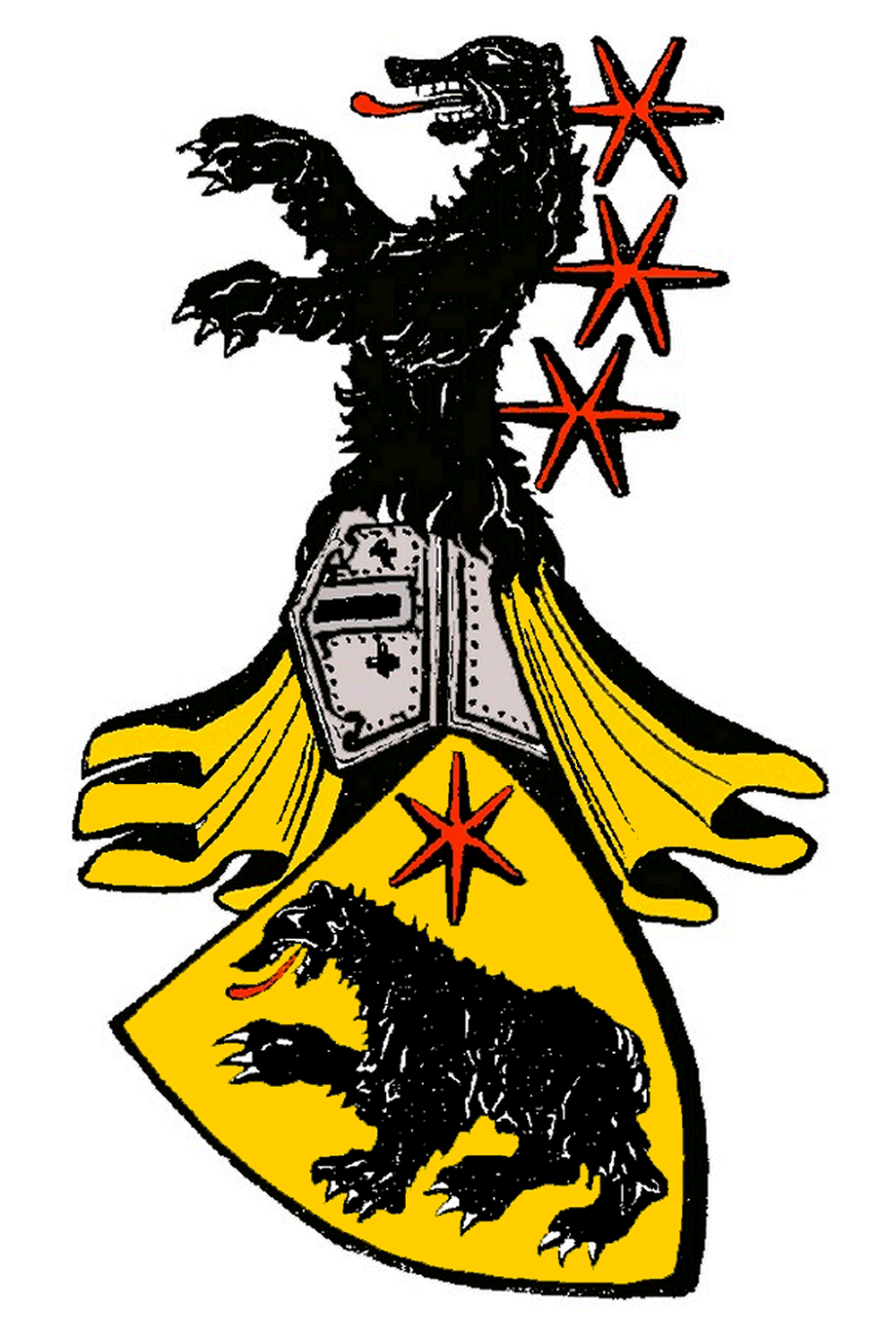

The Moos family respectively von Moos family is a Swiss patrician noble family originally hailing from the Canton of Uri which has been settled in Lucerne, Switzerland since the 14th century. The most prominent branch where steel industrialists and owners of the Von Moos Steel Works in Lucerne. Today the name is still used by one of the descendants in manufacturing of fine writing instruments.

== History ==
The ministerial lineage of the von Moos family was first recorded in 1281 with Petrus villicus de Palude and Johann (1285 to before 1331), a ministerial of the Disentis Abbey in Ursern. The continuous lineage begins with Konrad von Moos (1270–1328), documented from 1309 to 1317.

They held fiefs from Disentis, Wettingen, and Fraumünster, and owned properties in Altdorf and Wassen in the Urner Reusstal, maintaining dominance in Urserntal for two generations. In the 14th century, their political influence waned, and the Altdorf branches' male line vanished in the 17th century. Marriages were contracted only with Nobiles and ministerial families from Unterwalden and Lucerne.

In the early 14th century, the family engaged actively with Lucerne through trade and Gotthard traffic. Jost von Moos (1328–1369), a castle count in Neuhabsburg, settled in Lucerne around 1330, establishing the Lucerne branch. Heinrich (1339–1386) served as captain in the Battle of Sempach (1386) and entered Habsburg-Austrian service through marriage.

The family played a significant role in Lucerne's politics, producing leading figures. Heinrich (1387–1430) was a council member, the last of the Lucerne branch in a key political role. Economic decline after 1550 and diminishing political importance hindered the family's establishment in the urban patriciate. In the early 17th century, Kaspar (1582–1629) founded the Reformed branch in Zürich.

From 1680, Lucerne representatives engaged in the hardware trade, leading to economic and social ascent by the late 18th century. Associated with the Saffron Guild, Peter (1636–1713) operated a hammer mill in Kriens around 1680. The von Moos family produced industrialists, clergy, lawyers, doctors, engineers, architects, pharmacists, chemists, officers, foresters, writers, art historians, and artists such as Joseph (1859–1939), Paul (1882–1969), Max, and Stanislaus.

== Members ==
- Walter von Moos (1918-2016), Swiss industrialist

== Literature ==
- Franziska Hälg-Steffen; Moos, von (LU, UR), In; Historical Dictionary of Switzerland (in German)
