= Schmutz =

Schmutz may refer to:

- Charlie Schmutz (1891–1962), American Major League pitcher
- Gottfried Schmutz (born 1954), Swiss road racing cyclist
- Judith Schmutz (born 1996), Swiss politician
- Schmutz (film), 1987 Austrian film
