= Lords of Reinach =

Lords of Reinach Reinach-Foussemagne, Reinach-Werth, Reinach-Munzingen, Reinach-Hirtzbach, Reinach-Montreux, Reinach-Heidwiller, Reinach-Steinbrunn-le-Haut
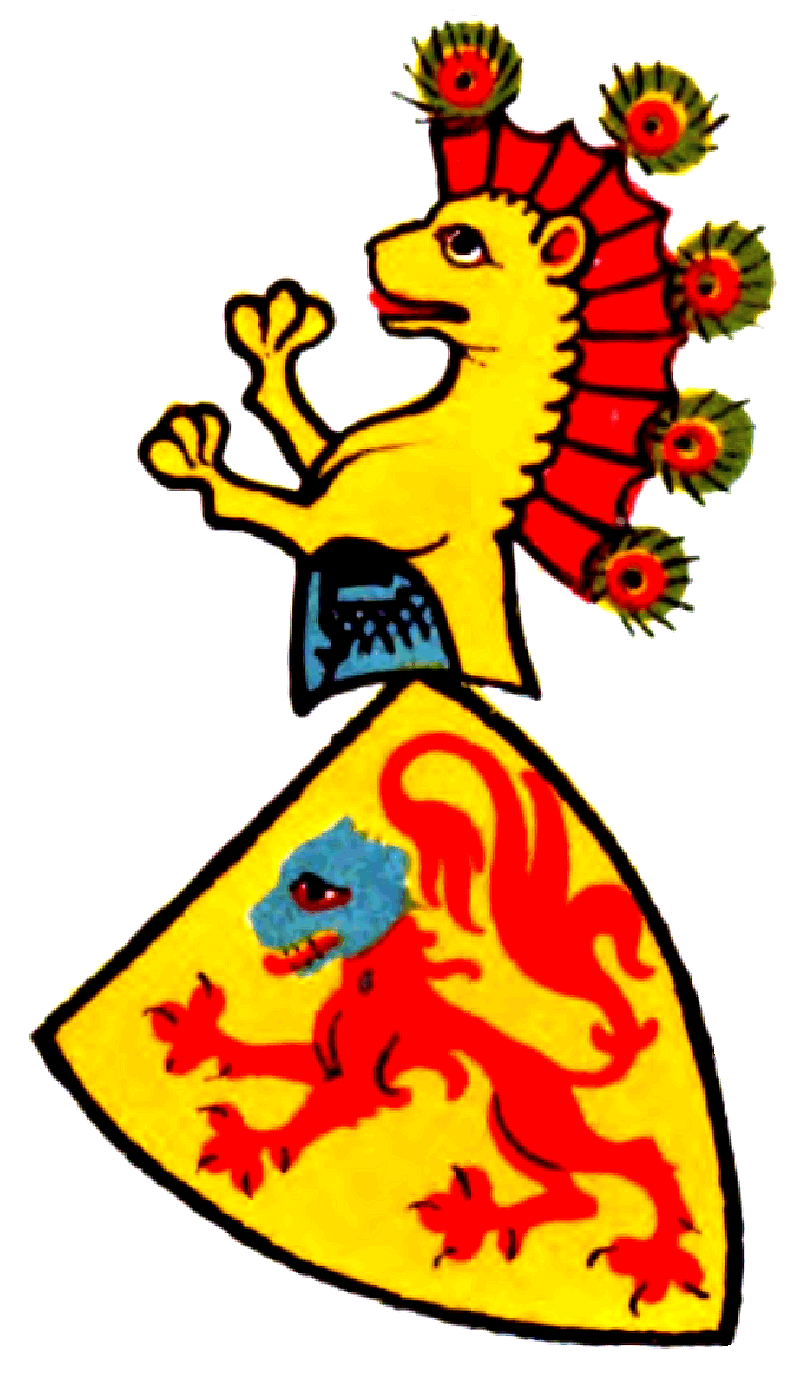
- Titles: Baron de Reinach

The Lords of Reinach (colloquially de Reinach family) is a noble family of Swiss origin which can be attested to 1210 originally stemming from the ancestral seat Untere Rinach in Burg, Aargau near Reinach, Switzerland.

The family is extinct in Switzerland with one lineage, Baron de Reinach-Hirtzbach, remaining extant in Sundgau and Alsace, France since selling off their remaining titles in 1545. They remain the owners of Château de Reinach in Hirtzbach, France.

== Hirtzbach lineage ==
The Reinach family became linked to Hirtzbach in the late 16th century through marriage. The connection was established when Marie Ursule Vay, heiress of the lordship of Hirtzbach, married Hans Diebold von Reinach, a nobleman and bailiff of Altkirch. Through this union, the Reinach family acquired the seigneury of Hirtzbach. Their descendants formed the Reinach-Hirtzbach branch, which rose in prominence in the 17th century and are the only current extant lineage of the family.
