= Rothenburg, Lucerne =

Rothenburg
- Municipality
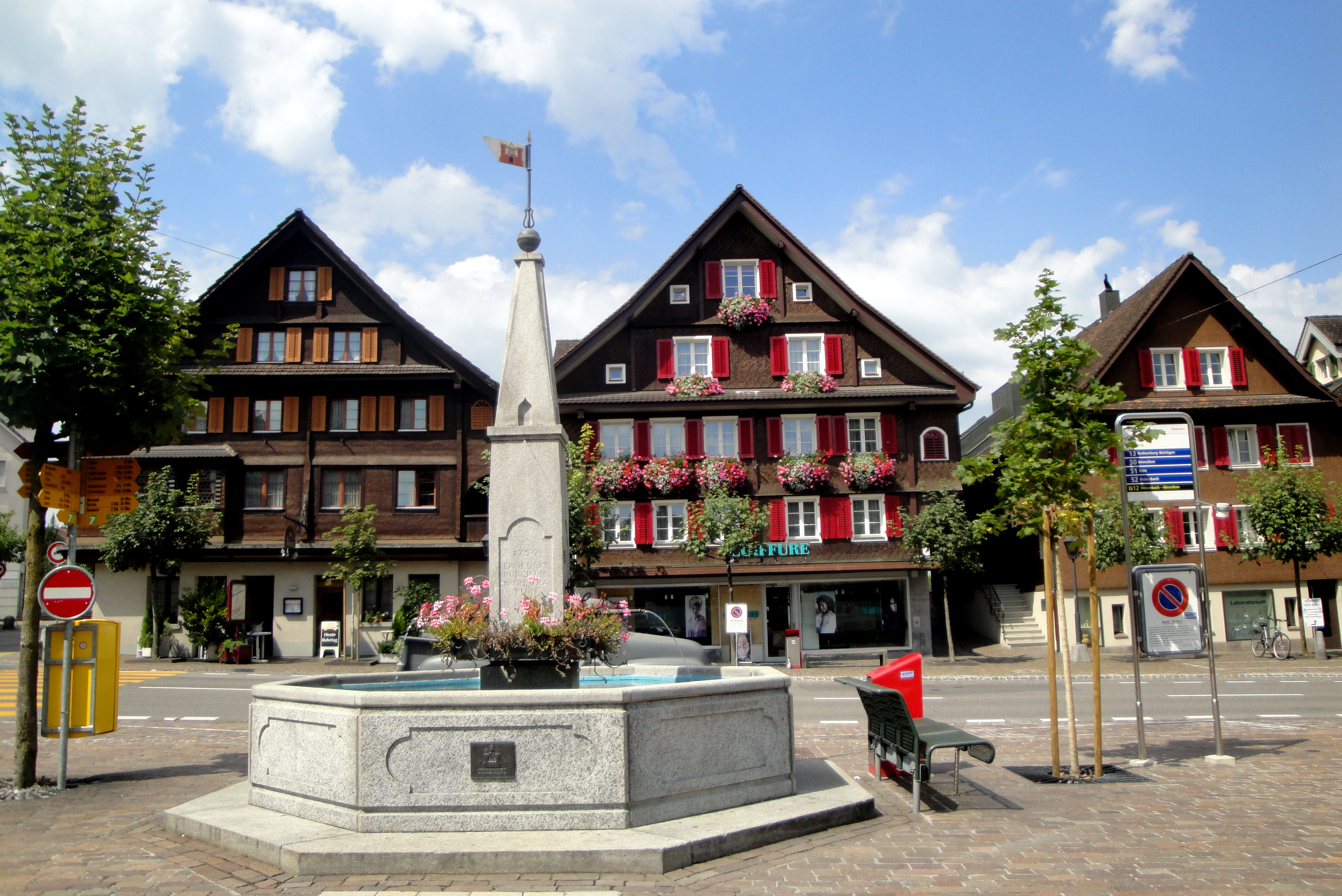

- Coat of arms
- Location of Rothenburg
- Location within Switzerland Location within Canton of Lucerne
- Coordinates: 47°6′N 8°16′E
- Country: Switzerland
- Canton: Lucerne
- District: Hochdorf

Area
  - Total: 15.50 km^{2} (5.98 sq mi)
- Elevation: 489 m (1,604 ft)

Population (December 2007)
  - Total: 7,032
  - Density: 453.7/km^{2} (1,175/sq mi)
- Time zone: UTC+01:00 (CET)
  - Summer (DST): UTC+02:00 (CEST)
- Postal code: 6023
- SFOS number: 1040
- ISO 3166 code: CH-LU
- Surrounded by: Emmen, Eschenbach, Neuenkirch, Rain
- Website: www.rothenburg.ch

Rothenburg (Swiss Standard German pronunciation: [ˈroːtn̩ˌbʊrɡ]; High Alemannic: Rooteborg) is a municipality in the district of Hochdorf in the canton of Lucerne in Switzerland.

== Geography ==
Aerial view (1946)

Rothenburg has an area of 15.5 km^{2} (6.0 sq mi). Of this area, 67.8% is used for agricultural purposes, while 16.6% is forested. Of the rest of the land, 15.5% is settled (buildings or roads) and the remainder (0.2%) is non-productive (rivers, glaciers or mountains). In the 1997 land survey, 16.56% of the total land area was forested. Of the agricultural land, 63.47% is used for farming or pastures, while 4.32% is used for orchards or vine crops. Of the settled areas, 5.86% is covered with buildings, 2.51% is industrial, 2% is classed as special developments, 0.71% is parks or greenbelts and 4.38% is transportation infrastructure. Of the unproductive areas, 0.06% is unproductive standing water (ponds or lakes), 0.13% is unproductive flowing water (rivers) and

== Demographics ==
Rothenburg has a population (as of 2007) of 7,032, of which 7.8% are foreign nationals. Over the last 10 years the population has grown at a rate of 13.2%. Most of the population (as of 2000) speaks German (94.1%), with Serbo-Croatian being second most common ( 1.2%) and Italian being third ( 1.0%).

In the 2007 election the most popular party was the CVP which received 29.1% of the vote. The next three most popular parties were the SVP (25%), the FDP (21.1%) and the SPS (15.5%).

The age distribution in Rothenburg is; 1,825 people or 25.6% of the population is 0–19 years old. 1,758 people or 24.7% are 20–39 years old, and 2,652 people or 37.2% are 40–64 years old. The senior population distribution is 696 people or 9.8% are 65–79 years old, 174 or 2.4% are 80–89 years old and 26 people or 0.4% of the population are 90+ years old.

In Rothenburg about 80.6% of the population (between age 25–64) have completed either non-mandatory upper secondary education or additional higher education (either university or a Fachhochschule).

As of 2000 there are 2,330 households, of which 555 households (or about 23.8%) contain only a single individual. 204 or about 8.8% are large households, with at least five members. As of 2000 there were 1,046 inhabited buildings in the municipality, of which 872 were built only as housing, and 174 were mixed use buildings. There were 598 single family homes, 105 double family homes, and 169 multi-family homes in the municipality. Most homes were either two (475) or three (276) story structures. There were only 34 single story buildings and 87 four or more story buildings.

Rothenburg has an unemployment rate of 1.3%. As of 2005, there were 215 people employed in the primary economic sector and about 70 businesses involved in this sector. 924 people are employed in the secondary sector and there are 77 businesses in this sector. 1918 people are employed in the tertiary sector, with 191 businesses in this sector. As of 2000 54% of the population of the municipality were employed in some capacity. At the same time, females made up 42.5% of the workforce.

In the 2000 census the religious membership of Rothenburg was; 4,804 (77.%) were Roman Catholic, and 772 (12.4%) were Protestant, with an additional 109 (1.75%) that were of some other Christian faith. There are 103 individuals (1.65% of the population) who are Muslim. Of the rest; there were 25 (0.4%) individuals who belong to another religion, 305 (4.89%) who do not belong to any organized religion, 121 (1.94%) who did not answer the question.

== Industry ==
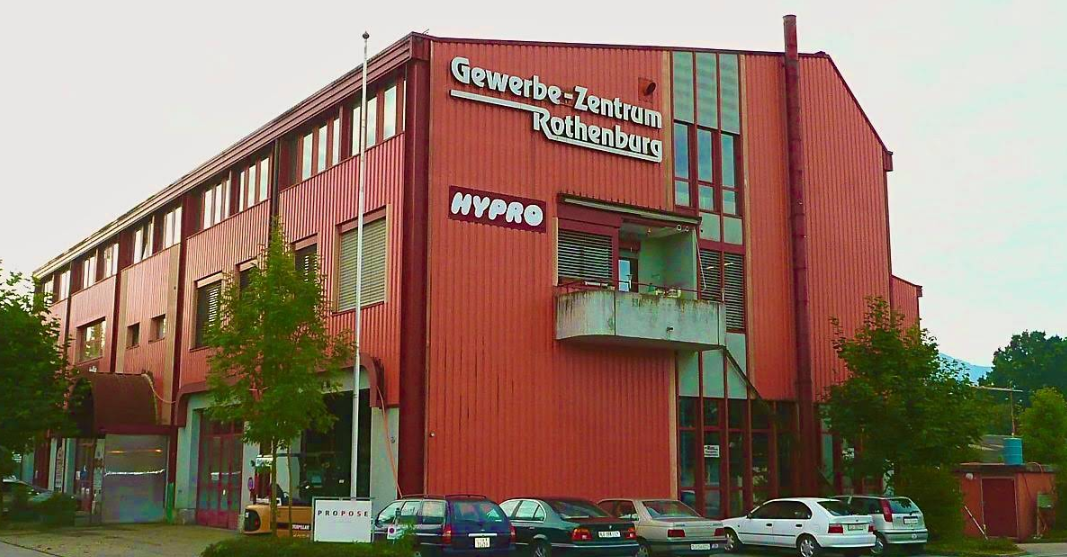
Rothenburg - Mundo AG

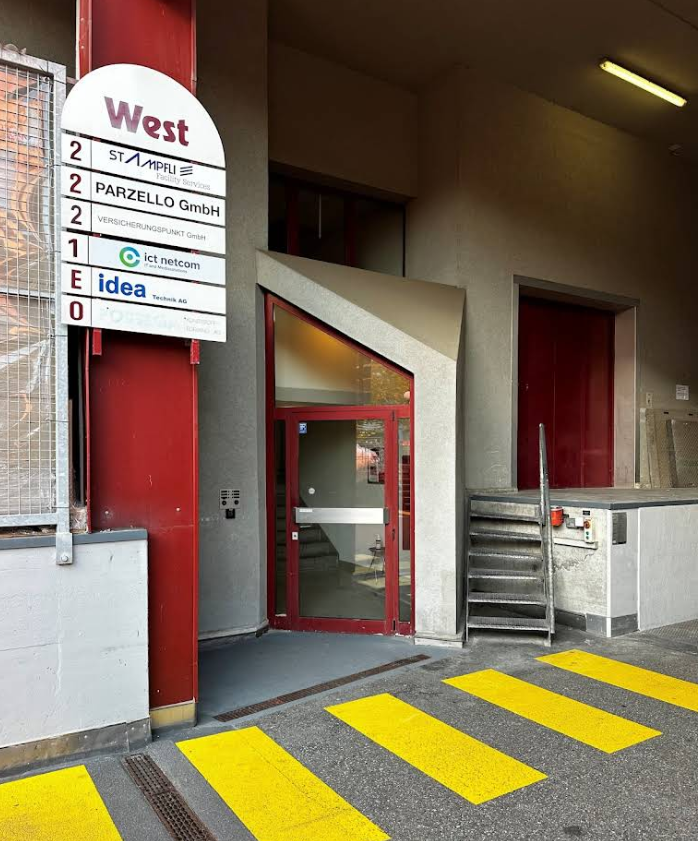

Rothenburg is a thriving industrial hub in Lucerne, hosting a diverse range of businesses. Notable companies include the Rothenburg distribution center of MUNDO, ICT Netcom, and Parzello GMBH . Additionally, Idea Technik AG and Stampfli contribute to the region’s innovation, while Versicherungspunkt GMBH offers essential insurance services, fostering a robust economy.
