= Schnabelburg Castle =

Castle ruin on the Albis, Switzerland

Coordinates: 47.263180°N 8.533354°E

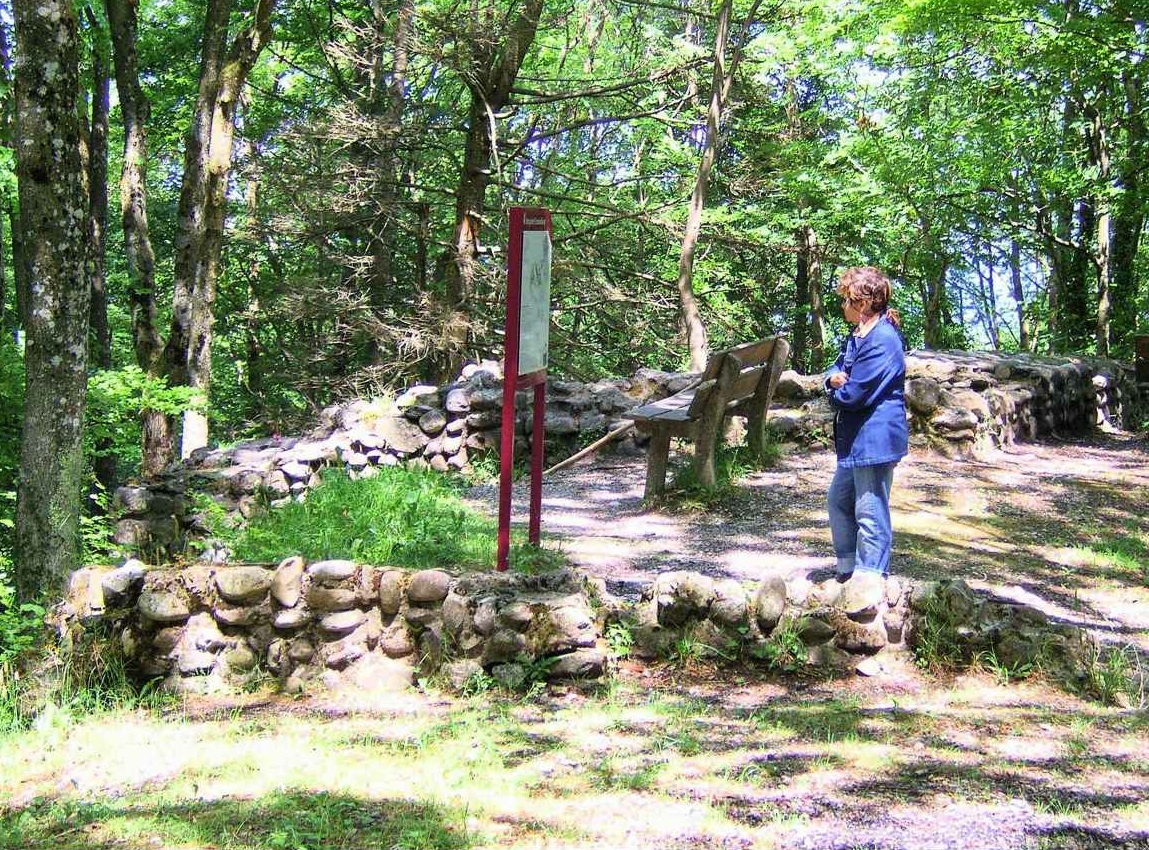
The ruins of the castle (2007)

Spherical panoramic of the ruins in June 2020 (view as a 360° interactive panorama)

Schnabelburg Castle (German: Schnabelburg) was a small castle erected in 1150 by the lords of Eschenbach (Switzerland, near Lucerne) on the Albis chain southwest of Zürich, Switzerland, overlooking the nearby Schnabellücken pass.

In 1309 the Schnabelburg was attacked by the Habsburgs, in revenge for the participation of Walter von Eschenbach in the murder of Albert I of Germany. All that is left today is low ruins, reachable in about 30 minutes on foot from the Albis Pass.
