= Huwiler Tower =

Tower in Zug, Switzerland

Coordinates: 47.164452°N 8.517982°E

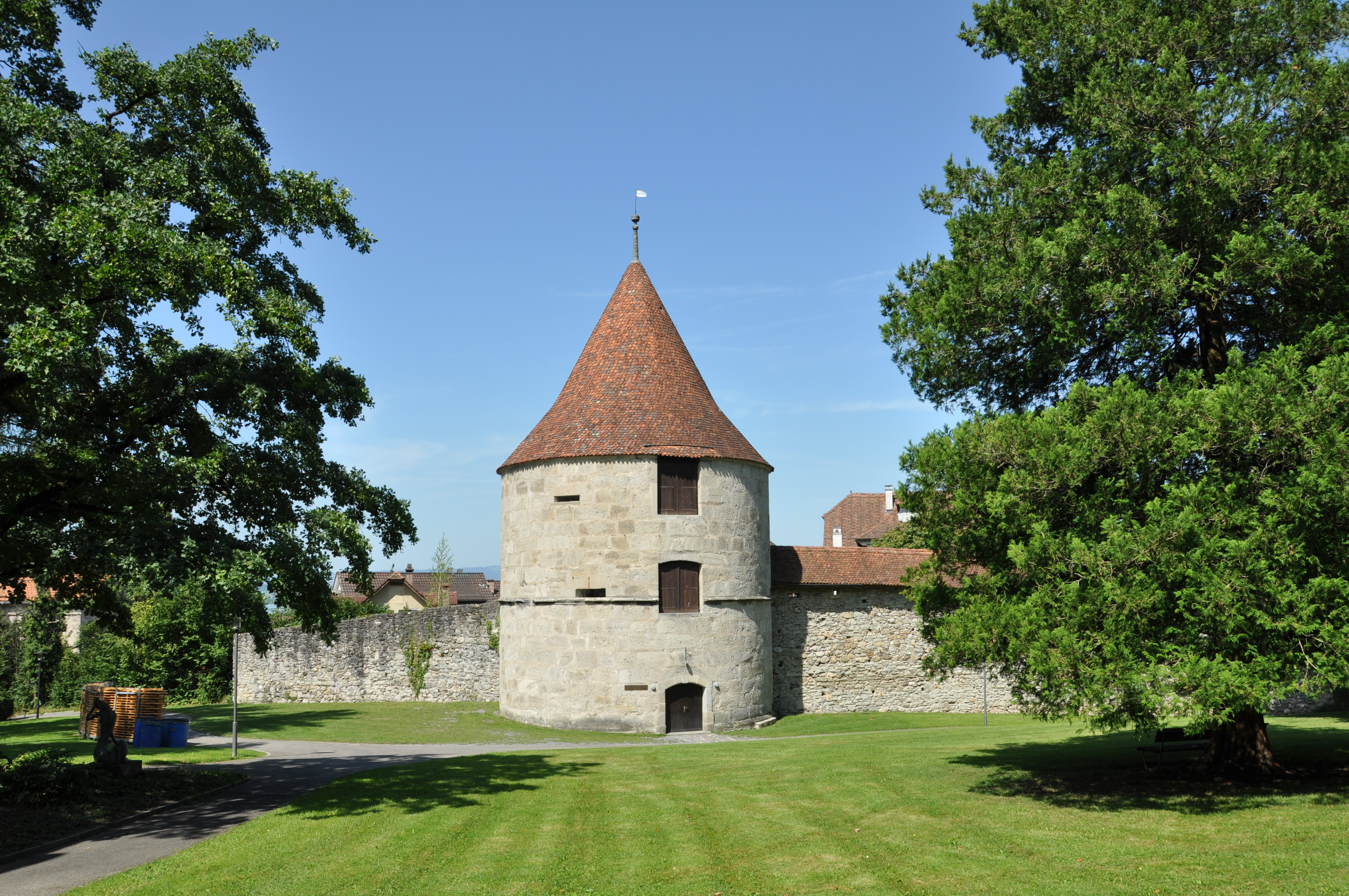
Huwilerturm - Park view

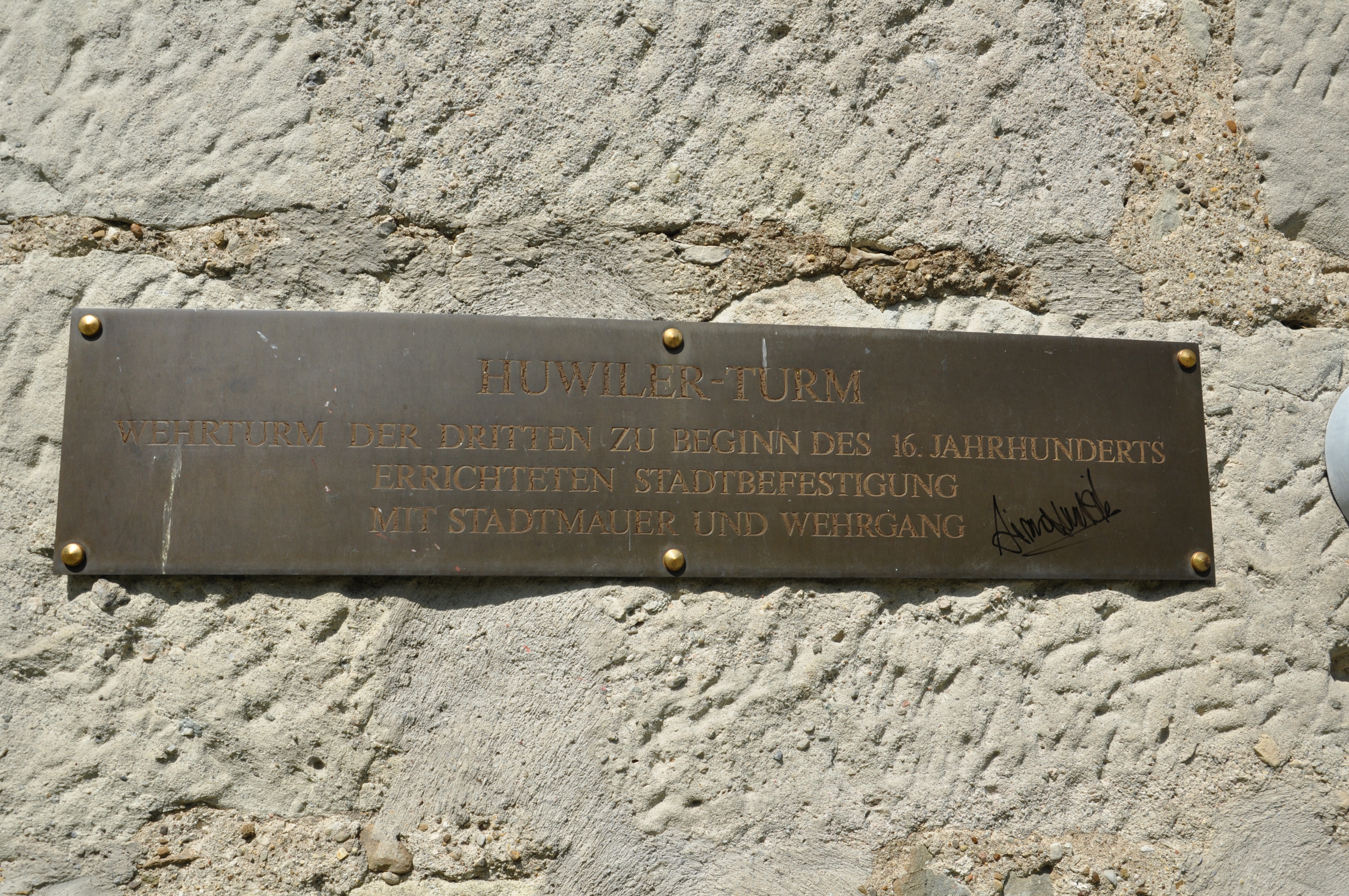
Huwilerturm - Inscription

Huwiler Tower (German: Huwilerturm) is the smallest of the four outer town wall towers in the city of Zug (Switzerland). Its exact age is unknown, but cannot be later than 1524/25. The tower was known for a long time as the "Hof" tower, and was called that until it was acquired by a citizen named Huwiler (a.k.a. Huwyler) in 1697. Huwiler tower was part of the defense system and the city wall, but as Zug was actually never under siege.

In 1870 the tower was auctioned and purchased by a private owner. Today the Huwiler tower stands in the pleasant surroundings of the art museum gardens in the "Hof im Dorf" property, and of the newly laid-out "Daheim Park" formerly known as Huwiler's meadow. The Corporals' Association Zug (UOV) has been the tenant of the tower since 1974, and its members have lovingly and authentically restored it.
