= Judith Schmutz =

Swiss lawyer and politician (born 1996)

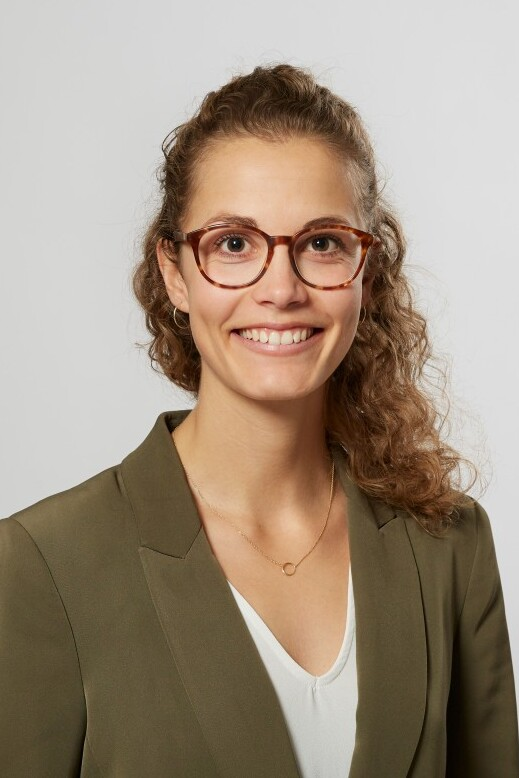

President of the Cantonal Council of Lucerne
- In office 19 June 2023 – 30 June 2024
- Preceded by: Rolf Born
- Succeeded by: Ferdinand Zehnder

Member of the Cantonal Council of Lucerne
- In office 17 June 2019 – 28 October 2024
- Constituency: Hochdorf District

Personal details
- Born: 1996 (age 29–30) Müllheim, Thurgau, Switzerland
- Party: Green Party of Switzerland
- Other political affiliations: Young Greens
- Education: University of Fribourg (LL.B); University of Lucerne (MLaw)

Judith Schmutz (German pronunciation: [juˈdɪt ʃmʊts]; born 1996) is a Swiss lawyer and politician who served as president of the Cantonal Council of Lucerne from 2023 until 2024. She was the youngest president of the council in the canton's history, and one of the youngest in all of Switzerland. Schmutz served on the cantonal council from 2019 until her resignation in 2024 representing the Hochdorf District.

== Early life and education ==
Schmutz was born in 1996 in Müllheim, Switzerland, to Jürg and Beate Schmutz. She grew up in the Canton of Thurgau until 2007, when her family moved to Rain in the Canton of Lucerne after her father became the state archivist.

Schmutz attended the Beromünster Cantonal School and spent an exchange year in South Dakota. She later received a Bachelor of Laws degree from the University of Fribourg and a Master of Laws degree from the University of Lucerne. After receiving her master's degree, Schmutz became an intern at the Hochdorf District Court and later joined a law firm in Lucerne.

== Political career ==
Inspired by her experiences in the United States, Schmutz joined the Green Party of Switzerland at age 16 and became politically active. She was a member of the Lucerne youth parliament from 2014 until 2018, and was a national co-president of the Young Greens from 2016 until 2018. She also became a board member of the local branch of the World Wildlife Fund in 2020.

Schmutz was elected to the Cantonal Council of Lucerne in the 2019 elections, representing the Hochdorf constituency. While in the council, she spoke against a proposal which would allocate 500 million francs for the construction of new roads in Lucerne, arguing that the canton should focus on public transportation instead. She also accused the cantonal government of lowering benchmark targets to signal to the national government that public transportation was not a major issue in Lucerne. Schmutz was vice president of the cantonal council from 2022 until 2023. She was re-elected to the council in the 2023 elections, receiving the highest number of votes on the Green Party list.

On 19 June 2023, Schmutz was elected to a one-year term as president of the Lucerne Cantonal Council, receiving 93 out of 116 councillor votes. Aged 26, she became the youngest council president in the canton's history, and one of the youngest in all of Switzerland. She left the role at the end of her term on 30 June 2024.

Schmutz resigned from the cantonal council on 28 October 2024, citing professional obligations.
