= Alpineum =

Coordinates: 47.0579°N 8.3103°E

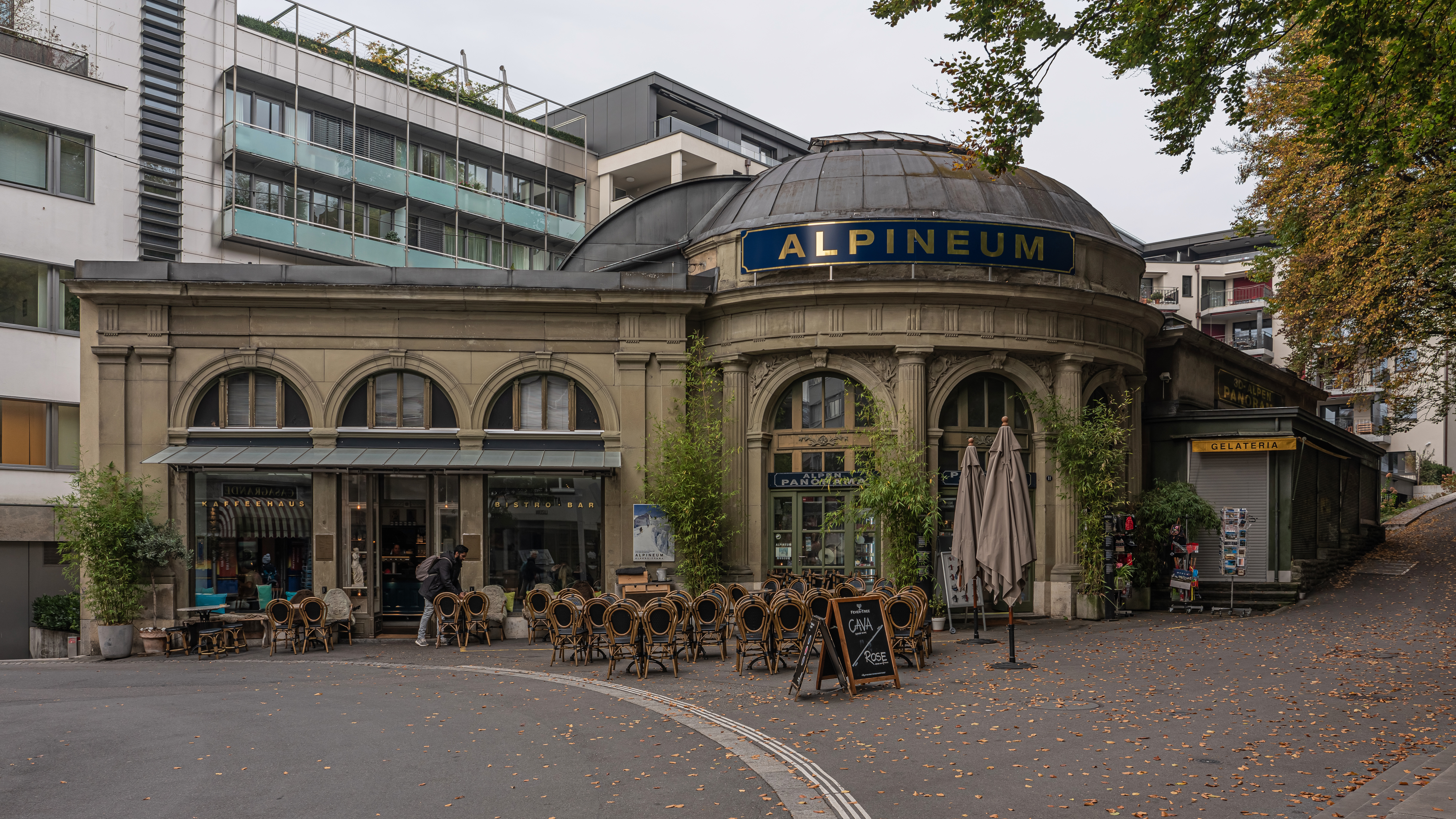
Alpineum Lucerne

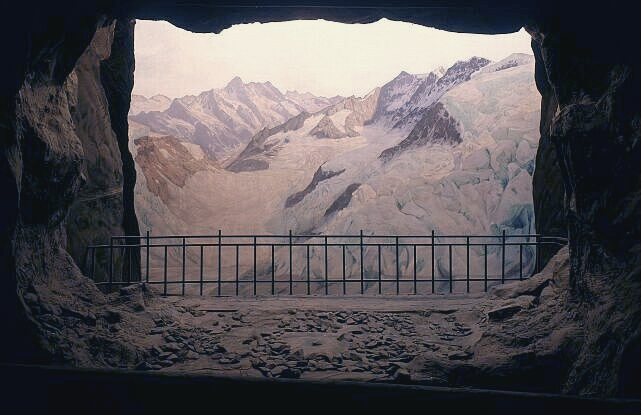
Station Eismeer of the Jungfraubahn

The Alpineum is a museum and diorama of the Alps in Lucerne, Switzerland.

== History ==
In 1885, Ernst Hodel senior purchased the building that formerly housed the Lion-Monument-Museum. His plan was to make a permanent exhibition of the large scale landscape paintings of the Alps that he loved. With the help of his son Ernst Hodel junior, he realized a series depicting the Alps, in effect a diorama, though not a continuous one, which opened in May 1901 under the name Alpineum. The paintings occupy a surface of more than five hundred square meters, offering beautiful and unique insight into the world of the Swiss Alps.

Despite Ernst Hodel the younger passing in 1955, the Alpineum continued operation under his descendants and is still open today.
