= Regula Stämpfli =

- Born: Bern, Switzerland

Academic background
- Education: University of Bern (PhD)
- Thesis: "Mit der Schürze in die Landesverteidigung." Staat, Wehrpflicht und Geschlecht (1999)

Academic work
- Discipline: Political scientist

Regula Stämpfli is a Swiss-born political scientist.

== Biography ==
Stämpfli's childhood was spent in Switzerland. Her teenage years were spent in California, USA. She returned to Switzerland for college, studying history and political philosophy. She continued her studies in New York City.

Stämpfli holds a doctorate in political science and also studied history and philosophy at the University of Bern. She is also a well known political commentator on current affairs in Switzerland and the author of many textbooks and articles dealing with issues such as democratic theory, European political decision making, women's history, design, political communications and political philosophy.

In 2021, Stämpfli was named one of the 50 most important Swiss intellectuals.

== Journalism ==
Working for many years as a "star columnist" for the Basler Zeitung, the Blick am Abend as well as for the first Swiss online news platform news.ch, Stämpfli has also written opinion pieces for the Neue Zürcher Zeitung and is cultural editor and head of "political literature" at the cultural magazine ensuite. She is a columnist for Radio1 in Zürich, the politics-expert for Radio 24 in Zürich, media-expert for www.kleinreport.ch, the German feminist magazine EMMA and columnist for Sonntag and Leben&Glauben.

Since the summer of 2020, Stämpfli, together with Isabel Rohner, has published a feminist weekly podcast review Die Podcastin. Stämpfli is also a concept developer and host of the science podcast for TA-SWISS and for Art is a Piece of Cake, together with Raimund Deininger.

== Academic Positions ==
Stämpfli is a member of the Ethics Council of Switzerland's Federal Office of Statistics, the Advisory Board of the International Forum of Design in Ulm, the Foundation Board of the Gosteliarchive and the University Council of the University of Applied Sciences Cologne. She is also an independent expert for the European Commission.

Stämpfli has taught history, political science and political philosophy at several Swiss and European educational institutions, including the University of Bern and University of Zurich. She is currently working as a political scientist and as a part-time professor at the Swiss College for Journalism in Lucerne. Stämpfli recently directed the Hannah Arendt Lectures at the University of St. Gallen. Since 1988, she has worked as a lecturer at the Media Training Center (CNAC) in Lucerne.

== Writing (selected) ==
- Direct Democracy and Women's Suffrage: Antagonism in Switzerland. In: Barbara J. Nelson/Najma Chowdhury (ed.): Women and Politics Worldwide. Yale University Press, New Haven–London 1994, pp. 690–704.
- With the apron in the national defense. Emancipation of women and Swiss Military 1914–1945. Orell Füssli, Zürich 2002, ISBN 3-280-02820-5 (revised dissertation, University of Bern, 1999).
- From silent citizens to voters: The ABC of Swiss politics. Orell Füssli, Zürich 2003, ISBN 3-280-05016-2.
- Christoph Dejung/Regula Stämpfli: Army, State and Gender: Switzerland in international comparison, 1918–1945. Chronos, Zürich 2003, ISBN 978-3-0340-0573-9.
- Berufsverbände zwischen gestern und heute. In: Ars Medici vol. 18/2004, pp. 896–897. Rosenfluh, Schaffhausen 2004. Retrieved 7 July 2022.
- In der Schweiz gilt das Normale als Kritik. Online-Publikation Bern–Brussels 2005, online published by Jonas Fertig 2020. Retrieved 7 July 2022.
- The power of the right barber: About pictures, media and women. Bartleby, Brussels 2007, ISBN 978-2-930279-37-4.
- Populism in Switzerland and the EU: from vox populi to vox mediae. In: Clive H. Church (ed.): Switzerland and the European Union: a close, contradictory and misunderstood relationship. Publication series Europe and the nation state vol. 11. Routledge, London 2007. Retrieved 7 July 2022.
- Joseph Riegger (photos)/Regula Stämpfli (text): Women without a mask. About women and their professions. Stämpfli, Bern 2009, ISBN 978-3-7272-1123-2.
- Outside Prada – empty inside? A philosophical kaleidoscope. Bartleby, Brussels 2010, ISBN 978-2-930279-41-1.
- Measuring the woman. From Botox, hormones, and other madness. Gütersloher Publishing House, Gütersloh 2013, ISBN 978-3-579-06639-4.
- Souvenirs: Marie Rameau. In: ensuite – Zeitschrift für Kultur & Kunst (ed.): Édition La ville brûle. Bern 2015, online published 2017. Retrieved 7 July 2022.
- It's Democracy, Stupid!. In: Magazin für Zukunftsmonitoring (ed.): Zukunft der Demokratie, Bern 3/2017, p. 4–9. Retrieved 23 August 2022.
- Träumen künstliche Intelligenzen von Demokratie?. In: Magazin für Zukunftsmontoring (ed.): Künstliche Intelligenz, Bern 2/2018, p. 8–11.
- Trumpism. Ein Phänomen verändert die Welt. Münsterverlag, Basel 2018, ISBN 978-3-905896-79-4.
- Europa zwischen Banksprech und Sehnsuchtsort. Darf man als europäische Intellektuelle Europa kritisieren?. In: Denknetz (ed.): Yearbook. Zürich 2020, 9 p., online published 2021. Retrieved 7 July 2022.
- Sex, Katzen & Diäten. Die Kultkolumnen. Edition Königstuhl, St. Gallenkappel 2021, ISBN 978-3-907339-07-7.

== Editions ==
- Marthe Gosteli/Regula Zürcher: Vergessene Geschichte: Illustrierte Chronik der Frauenbewegung (in French and German). Stämpfli, Bern 2000, ISBN 978-3-7272-9256-9.
- Marthe Gosteli/Verena E. Müller: Bewegte Vergangenheit: 20 Jahre Archiv zur Geschichte der Schweizerischen Frauenbewegung (in German). Stämpfli, Bern 2002, ISBN 978-3-7272-1270-3.
