= Jost Franz Huwyler-Boller =

Swiss architect

Jost-Franz Huwyler-Boller (1874 – 1930) was a Swiss architect from Zurich who built several famous hotels.

== Career ==
Jost Franz Huwyler-Boller is best known as the architect of the historic Kurhaus Hotel in Bergün, GR. This grand hotel was designed following the Jugendstil style. The hotel was built from 1905 to 1907. It was awarded the "Historical Hotel of the Year" in 2012 by ICOMOS. He also designed the Cresta Palace Hotel in Celerina (St. Moritz), the Schweizerhof Hotel in Como and the former Hotel Reber au Lac in Locarno.

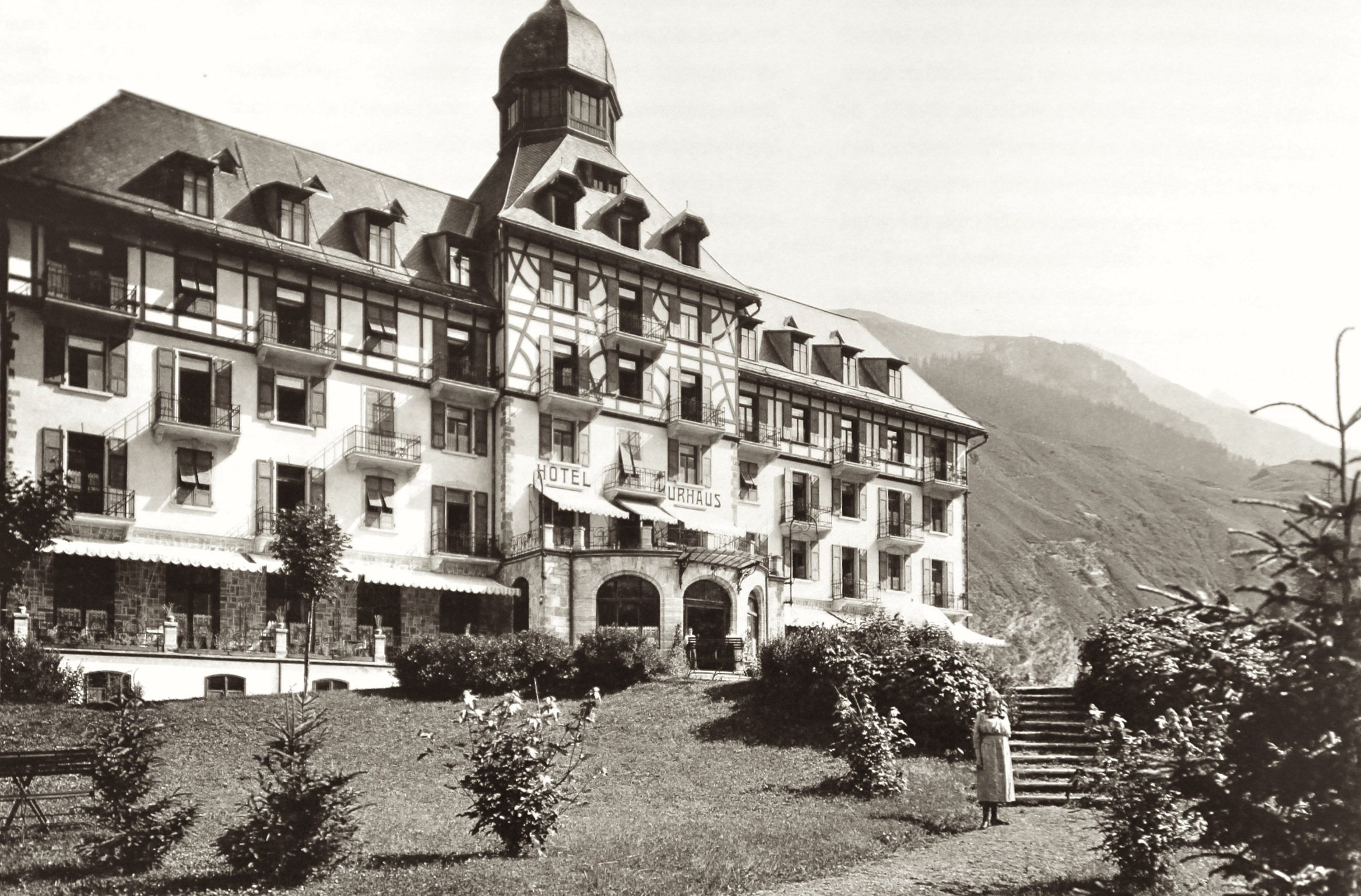
Main facade Kurhaus Bergun

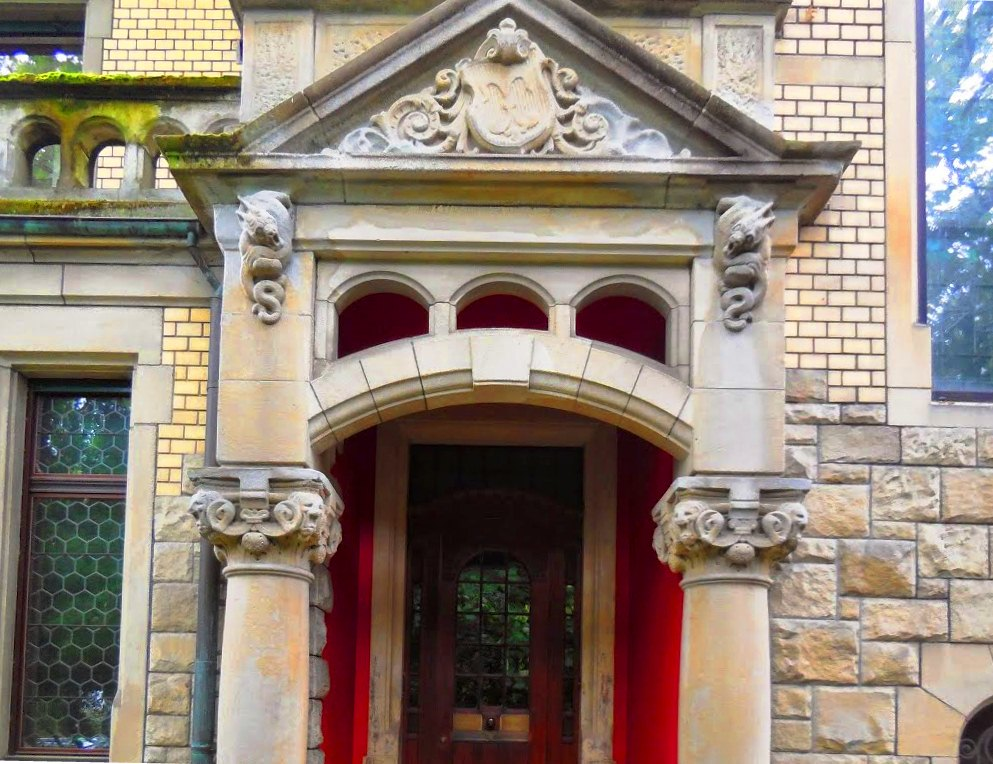
Plattenstrasse 58, Zurich 1905 1906

== External References ==
- ICOMOS Historical Hotel - Kurhaus Berguen (in German)
