= Hochdorf, Lucerne =

Hochdorf
- Municipality
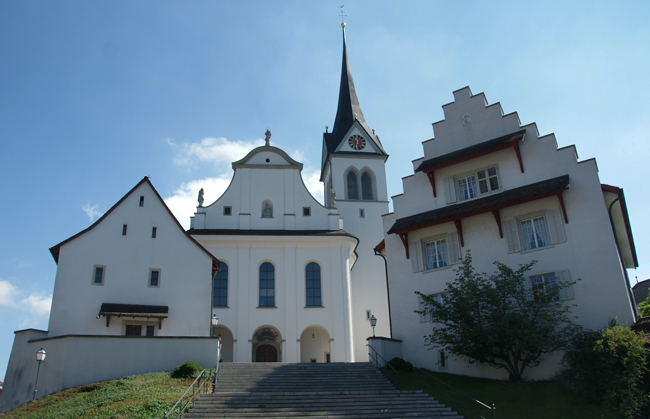

- Coat of arms
- Location of Hochdorf
- Location within Switzerland Location within Canton of Lucerne
- Coordinates: 47°10′N 8°17′E
- Country: Switzerland
- Canton: Lucerne
- District: Hochdorf

Area
  - Total: 9.6 km^{2} (3.7 sq mi)
- Elevation: 491 m (1,611 ft)
- Highest elevation (East of Urswil): 513 m (1,683 ft)
- Lowest elevation (Baldeggersee): 464 m (1,522 ft)

Population (December 2007)
  - Total: 8,246
  - Density: 860/km^{2} (2,200/sq mi)
- Time zone: UTC+01:00 (CET)
  - Summer (DST): UTC+02:00 (CEST)
- Postal code: 6280-6283
- SFOS number: 1031
- ISO 3166 code: CH-LU
- Localities: Hochdorf Dorf, Baldegg, Ligschwil, Urswil
- Surrounded by: Ballwil, Eschenbach, Hohenrain, Rain, Römerswil
- Website: www.hochdorf.ch

Hochdorf (Swiss Standard German pronunciation: [ˈhoːxdɔrf]) is a municipality in the district of Hochdorf in the canton of Lucerne in Switzerland.

== History ==
Hochdorf is first mentioned in 924 as Hodorf.

== Geography ==
Aerial view by Walter Mittelholzer (1919)

Hochdorf is located in the upper Seetal valley, in the canton of Lucerne.

The municipality consists of the village of Hochdorf and the hamlets of Baldegg, Huwyl, Urswil and part of Ligschwil. It has an area of 9.6 km^{2} (3.7 sq mi). Of this area, 61.9% is used for agricultural purposes, while 10.5% is forested. Of the rest of the land, 26.2% is settled (buildings or roads) and the remainder (1.5%) is non-productive (rivers, glaciers or mountains). In the 1997 land survey, 10.21% of the total land area was forested. Of the agricultural land, 64.69% is used for farming or pastures, while 3.33% is used for orchards or vine crops. Of the settled areas, 10% is covered with buildings, 4.27% is industrial, 0.42% is classed as special developments, 1.35% is parks or greenbelts and 5.21% is transportation infrastructure. Of the unproductive areas, 0.1% is unproductive standing water (ponds or lakes), 0.1% is unproductive flowing water (rivers) and 0.31% is other unproductive land.

== Demographics ==
Hochdorf has a population (as of 2007) of 8,246, of which 18.5% are foreign nationals. Over the last 10 years the population has grown at a rate of 10.1%. Most of the population (as of 2000) speaks German (87.2%), with Italian being second most common (2.6%) and Albanian being third (2.6%).

In the 2007 election the most popular party was the CVP which received 34.4% of the vote. The next three most popular parties were the SVP (25.7%), the FDP (21.8%) and the SPS (9.3%).

The age distribution in Hochdorf is; 2,044 people or 24.4% of the population is 0–19 years old. 2,131 people or 25.4% are 20–39 years old, and 2,875 people or 34.3% are 40–64 years old. The senior population distribution is 930 people or 11.1% are 65–79 years old, 349 or 4.2% are 80–89 years old and 56 people or 0.7% of the population are 90+ years old.

The entire Swiss population is generally well educated. In Hochdorf about 67.4% of the population (between age 25–64) have completed either non-mandatory upper secondary education or additional higher education (either university or a Fachhochschule).

As of 2000 there are 2,774 households, of which 815 households (or about 29.4%) contain only a single individual. 290 or about 10.5% are large households, with at least five members. As of 2000 there were 1,084 inhabited buildings in the municipality, of which 862 were built only as housing, and 222 were mixed use buildings. There were 518 single family homes, 94 double family homes, and 250 multi-family homes in the municipality. Most homes were either two (375) or three (304) story structures. There were only 25 single story buildings and 158 four or more story buildings.

Hochdorf has an unemployment rate of 1.67%. As of 2017, there were 141 people employed in the primary economic sector and about 29 businesses involved in this sector. 1861 people are employed in the secondary sector and there are 106 businesses in this sector. 3016 people are employed in the tertiary sector, with 440 businesses in this sector. As of 2000 50.7% of the population of the municipality were employed in some capacity. At the same time, females made up 46% of the workforce.

In the 2000 census the religious membership of Hochdorf was; 6,003 (77.3%) were Roman Catholic, and 670 (8.6%) were Protestant, with an additional 232 (2.99%) that were of some other Christian faith. There are 2 individuals (0.03% of the population) who are Jewish. There are 344 individuals (4.43% of the population) who are Muslim. Of the rest; there were 55 (0.71%) individuals who belong to another religion, 232 (2.99%) who do not belong to any organized religion, 223 (2.87%) who did not answer the question.

The historical population is given in the following table:

Year	Population
1456	c300
1695	c1,970
1798	1,077
1850	1,370
1900	1,645
1910	3,013
1950	3,768
2000	7,761
