= Hirtzbach =

Commune in Grand Est, France

- Commune
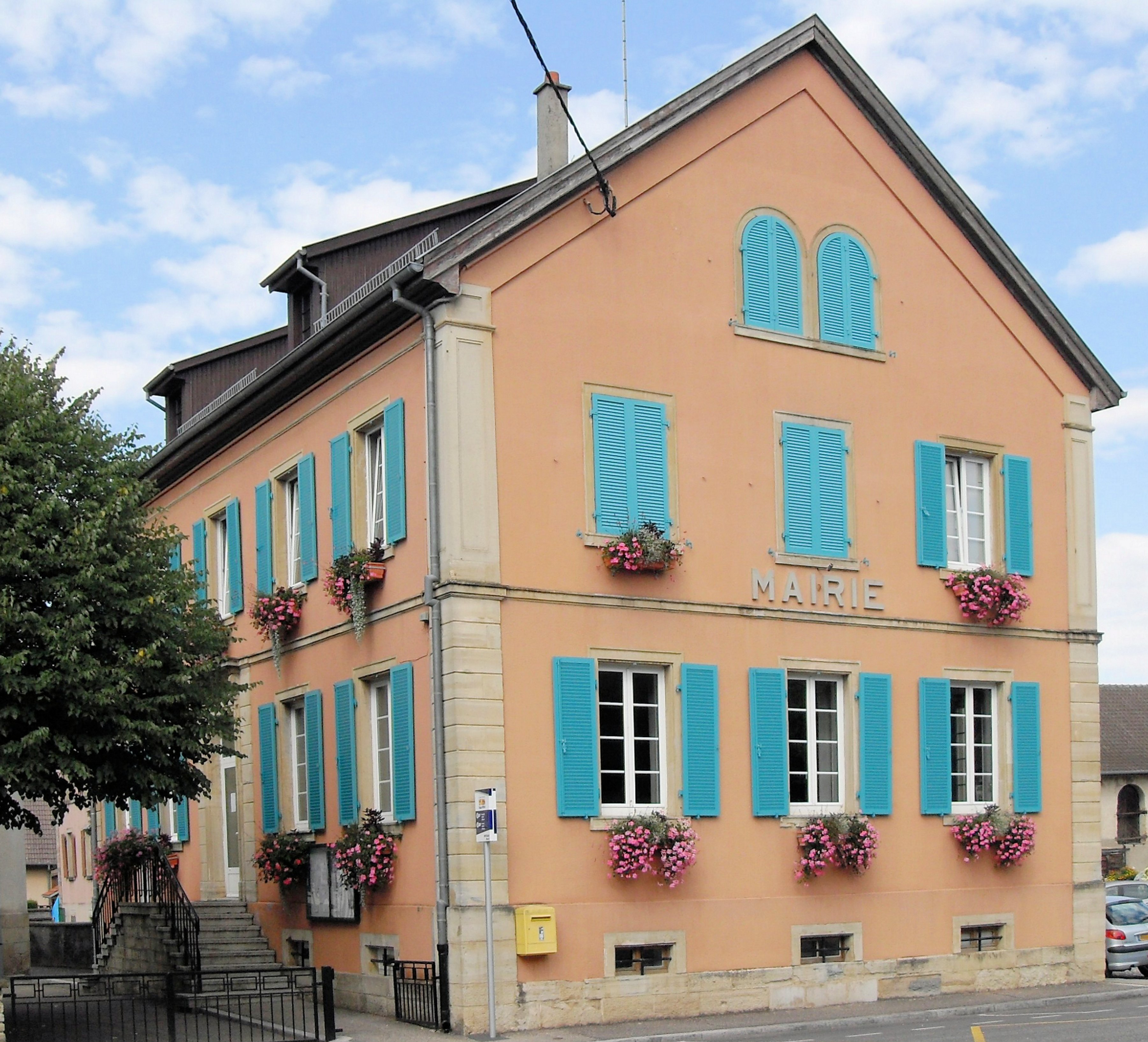
- The town hall in Hirtzbach

- Coat of arms
- Location of Hirtzbach
- Location within France Location within Grand Est
- Coordinates: 47°35′51″N 7°13′22″E
- Country: France
- Region: Grand Est
- Department: Haut-Rhin
- Arrondissement: Altkirch
- Canton: Altkirch

Government
  - Mayor (2020–2026): Arsène Schoenig
- Area^{1}: 13.91 km^{2} (5.37 sq mi)
- Highest elevation: 417 m (1,368 ft)
- Lowest elevation: 298 m (978 ft)
- Population (2023): 1,418
  - Density: 101.9/km^{2} (264.0/sq mi)
- Time zone: UTC+01:00 (CET)
  - Summer (DST): UTC+02:00 (CEST)
- INSEE/Postal code: 68139 /68118
- ^{1} French Land Register data, which excludes lakes, ponds, glaciers > 1 km^{2} (0.386 sq mi or 247 acres) and river estuaries.

Hirtzbach (French pronunciation: [iʁtsbak]; German: Hirzbach) is a commune in the Haut-Rhin department in Alsace in north-eastern France.

== See also ==
- Château de Reinach
- Communes of the Haut-Rhin département
