= Rudolf Stämpfli =

Swiss entrepreneur and publisher

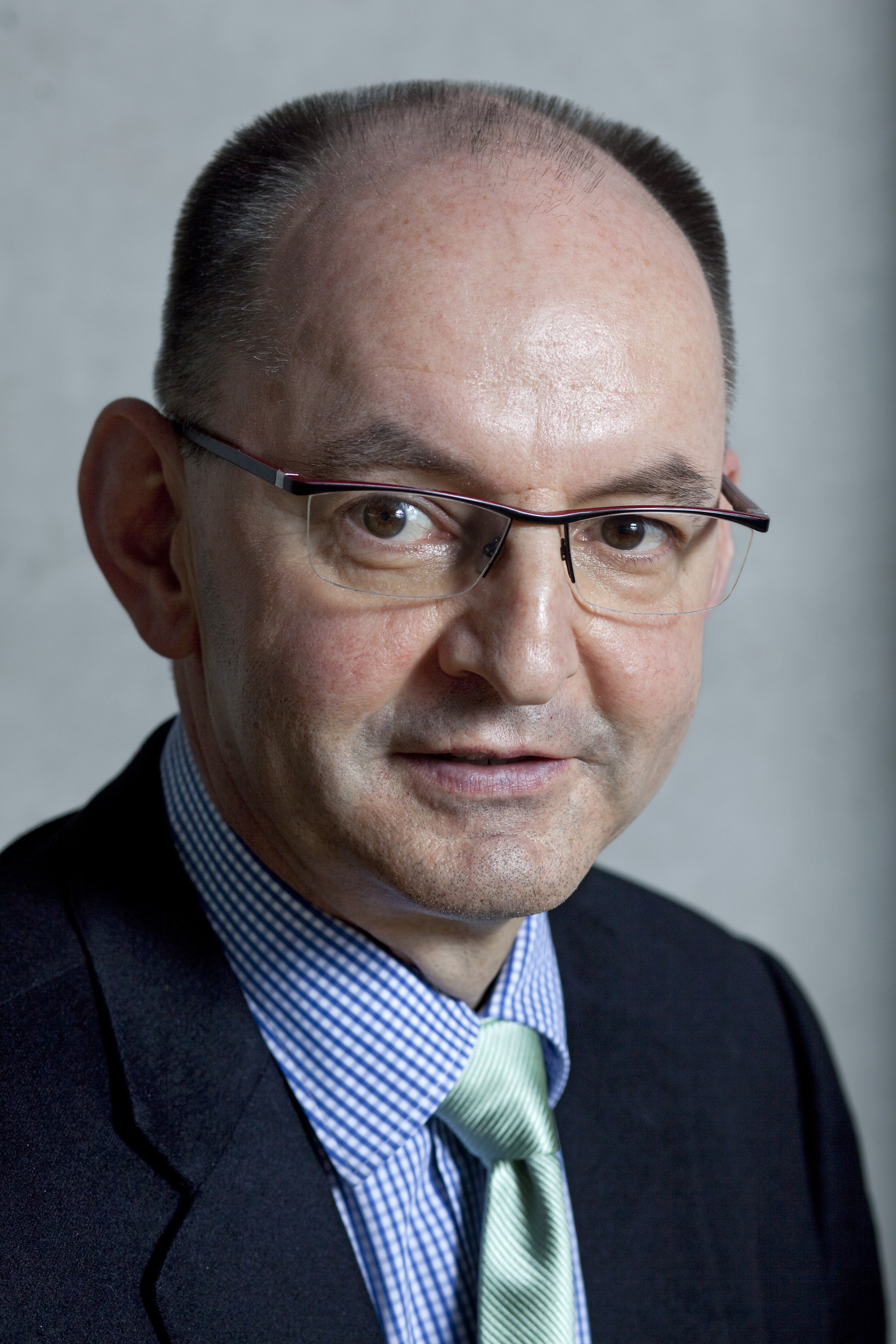
- Born: 3 August 1955 (age 71); Bern, Switzerland
- Education: University of St. Gallen (Ph.D., 1985); Stanford Graduate School of Business (1998)
- Occupations: President of the board of directors and publisher of Stämpfli Verlag AG, President of the Board of Directors of BLS AG, Vice President of the Board of Mobiliar Holding AG

Rudolf Stämpfli (born 3 August 1955, in Bern, Switzerland) is a Swiss entrepreneur of the graphic arts industry and publisher. Together with his brother Peter Stämpfli since 1988, he has run the sixth generation of the family business Stämpfli AG in Bern.

== Life ==
Stämpfli spent his school time in Bern. From 1977 to 1982, Rudolf Stämpfli studied business administration and operations research at the University of St. Gallen (HSG). In 1985, through his doctoral thesis on the calculation in the graphic arts industry he received his oec. HSG doctorate. In 1998, Stämpfli completed further education at the Stanford Graduate School of Business in California. At the "dies academicus" in December 2014, the Faculty of Economics and Social Sciences of the University of Bern awarded him an honorary doctorate.

== Career ==
In 1984 he joined the family business, Stämpfli AG in Bern, and in 1988, at the age of 33, he took over the company together with his brother Peter Stämpfli. Today he is President of the board of directors and publisher of Stämpfli Verlag AG. From 2009 he was also President of the Board of Directors of BLS AG in Bern until November 2020, when he retired for health reasons; and has been Vice President of the Board of Mobiliar Holding AG since 2013.

From 28 June 2003 until 1 July 2011 he was President of the Swiss Employers Association. In addition, Stämpfli engaged in the Burgergemeinde Bern, acting as its vice president from 2011 to mid-2016.

In 2017, Stämpfli achieved a compromise between BLS AG and Swiss Federal Railways in their extended legal dispute over new long-distance concessions.

== Awards ==
- 2009: 25th HIV award winner of the Canton of Bern
- 2014: Dr. rer. oec. h. c. awarded by the University of Bern
