= Marcel Schwerzmann =

Swiss politician (born 1965)

Member of the Executive Council of Lucerne
- In office 1 July 2007 – 30 June 2023
- Succeeded by: Armin Hartmann

Personal details
- Born: 15 January 1965 (age 61) Lucerne, Switzerland
- Party: Independent
- Children: 1
- Education: University of St. Gallen (Licentiate)
- Occupation: Consultant

Marcel Schwerzmann (born 15 January 1965) is a Swiss independent politician who served as a member of the Executive Council of Lucerne for 16 years.

== Early life and education ==
Schwerzmann was born on 15 January 1965 in Lucerne, Switzerland. After finishing his secondary education, he started his study for business administration at the University of St. Gallen in 1987, which he finished in 1993 with a licentiate.

Schwerzmann started working for the canton of Lucerne in June 2003 as the head of the tax administration, where he worked until his election to the Executive Council.

== Politics ==
The 2007 election of the Executive Council was marked by the Bühlmann affair, where it became public that Daniel Bühlmann (SVP), the then Finance Director, had made several missteps, including revelations about private debts. In the first round, all incumbent councillors, other than Bühlmann, were re-elected. In the second round, Schwerzmann won the last seat thanks to the support of FDP and CVP voters with 39,919 votes, before Peter Unternährer, the alternate candidate of the SVP, who got 30,709 votes. This was the first time an independent politician was elected to the Executive Council of Lucerne. He was re-elected 3 times, in 2011, 2015 and 2019. He was also elected as Regierungspräsident for the terms 2011, 2016/2017 and 2021/2022. Following the 2019 election, after 12 years as Finance Director, Schwerzmann surprisingly became the Director of Education and Culture. It was rumoured that it was not a voluntary decision, as it was likely going to be his last term. In July 2022, Schwerzmann announced his resignation, with his last term ending 30 June 2023.

== Personal life ==
Schwerzmann has one son and lives in Kriens. He's an avid sailor and in 2002 took part in a Transatlantikregatta from Gran Canaria to Saint Lucia and finished second in the cruiser class.
