= Jakob Huwyler =

Swiss artist (1867–1938)

- Born: Jakob Huwyler (aka Jakob Huwiler); 20 August 1867; Sursee
- Died: 27 April 1938 (aged 70); Ruswil
- Education: Academy of Fine Arts
- Known for: Painting, Graphic Arts, Religious paintings, Portraits
- Movement: Expressionism

Jakob Huwyler II (30 August 1867 – 27 April 1938), Swiss artist, was born in Sursee LU, the son of Jakob Huwyler I, another painter. He is famous for painting the frescos in the Catholic church of St. Andreas in Gremheim (Dillingen, Germany).

== Life ==
=== Training as an artist ===
The artistic career of Jakob Huwyler II started in the School of Applied Arts in Lucerne and Munich, where he was able to study thanks to a scholarship from the Art Academy. He studied under professors Friedrich Fehr and Ludwig Schmid-Reutte

=== An academic and artistic career ===
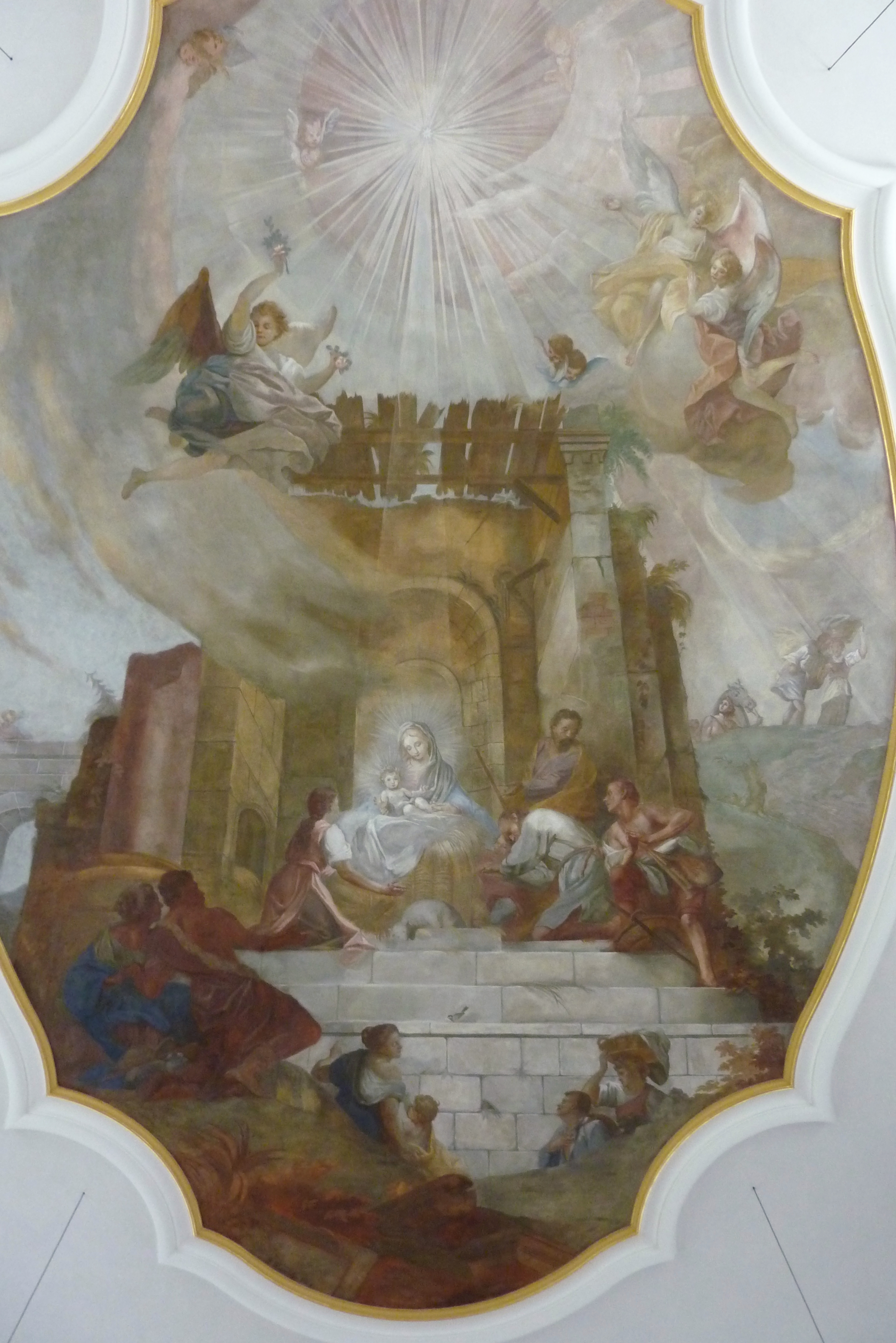
Ceiling painting by Jacob Huwyler in 1908

Besides the restoration of many important frescoes, he created a number of original works, ceiling frescoes, altarpieces and crossroads. He lived in Munich from 1888 to 1933. During this period, he painted the ceilings of the church of St. Andreas in 1908 and 1927 with remarkable scenes of the holy family, the annunciation and the way to the cross. He later moved to Ruswil LU. Since 1933, he performed various religious paintings in Grossdietwil, Grosswangen, Ruswil, Rüediswil and Sursee. He painted the frescos in the chapel of St. Jost and St. Wendelin in Rüediswil (Lucerne, Switzerland) in 1936. Besides the frescoes, he worked as portrait painter. His talent to express the essence and the character of people gained the highest recognition. He died in Ruswil (Lucern) in 1938. His younger son Willy Huwiler took over his legacy to start the third generation of artists.

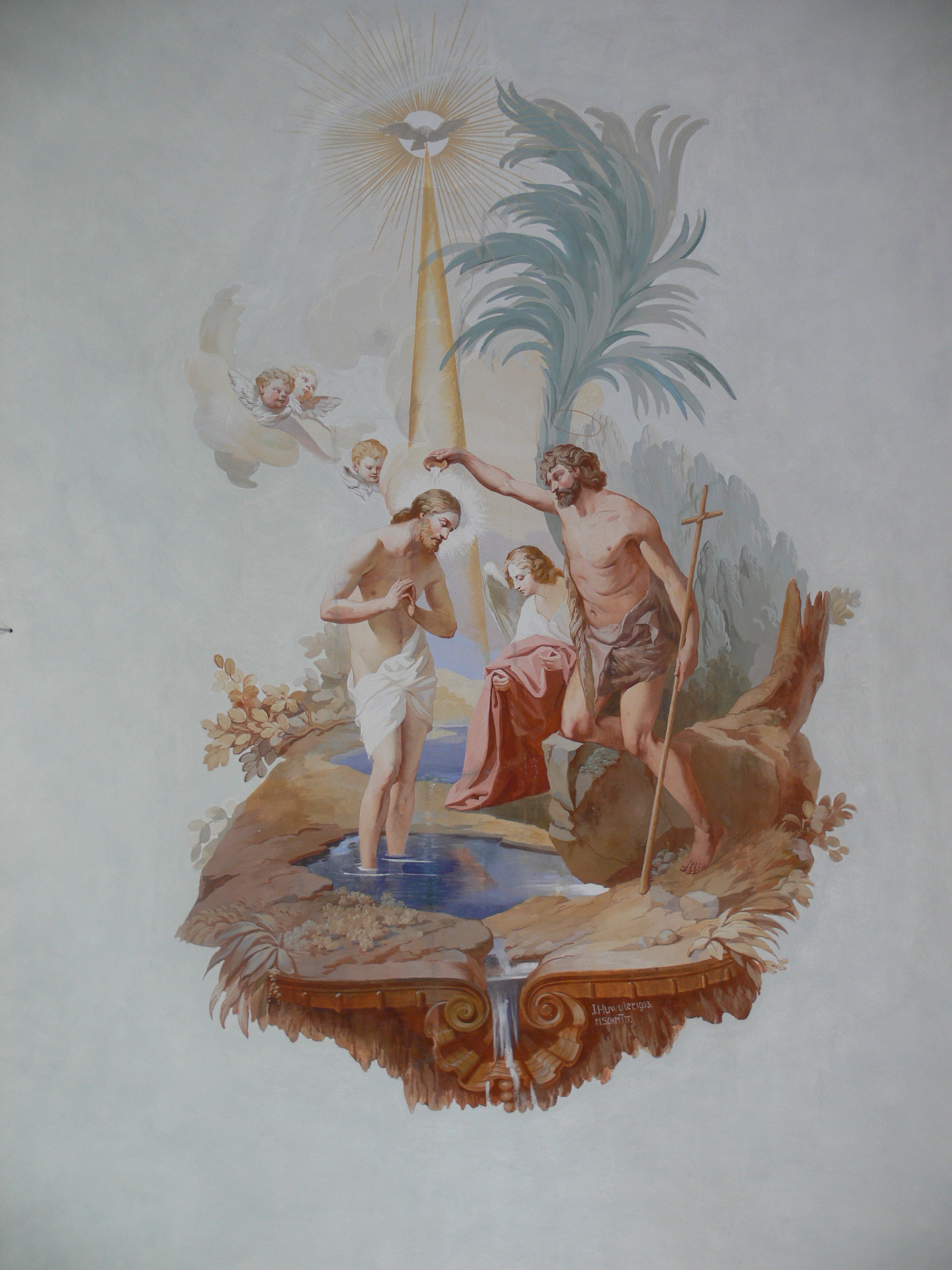
A painting by Huwyler
