= Rain, Lucerne =

Rain
- Municipality
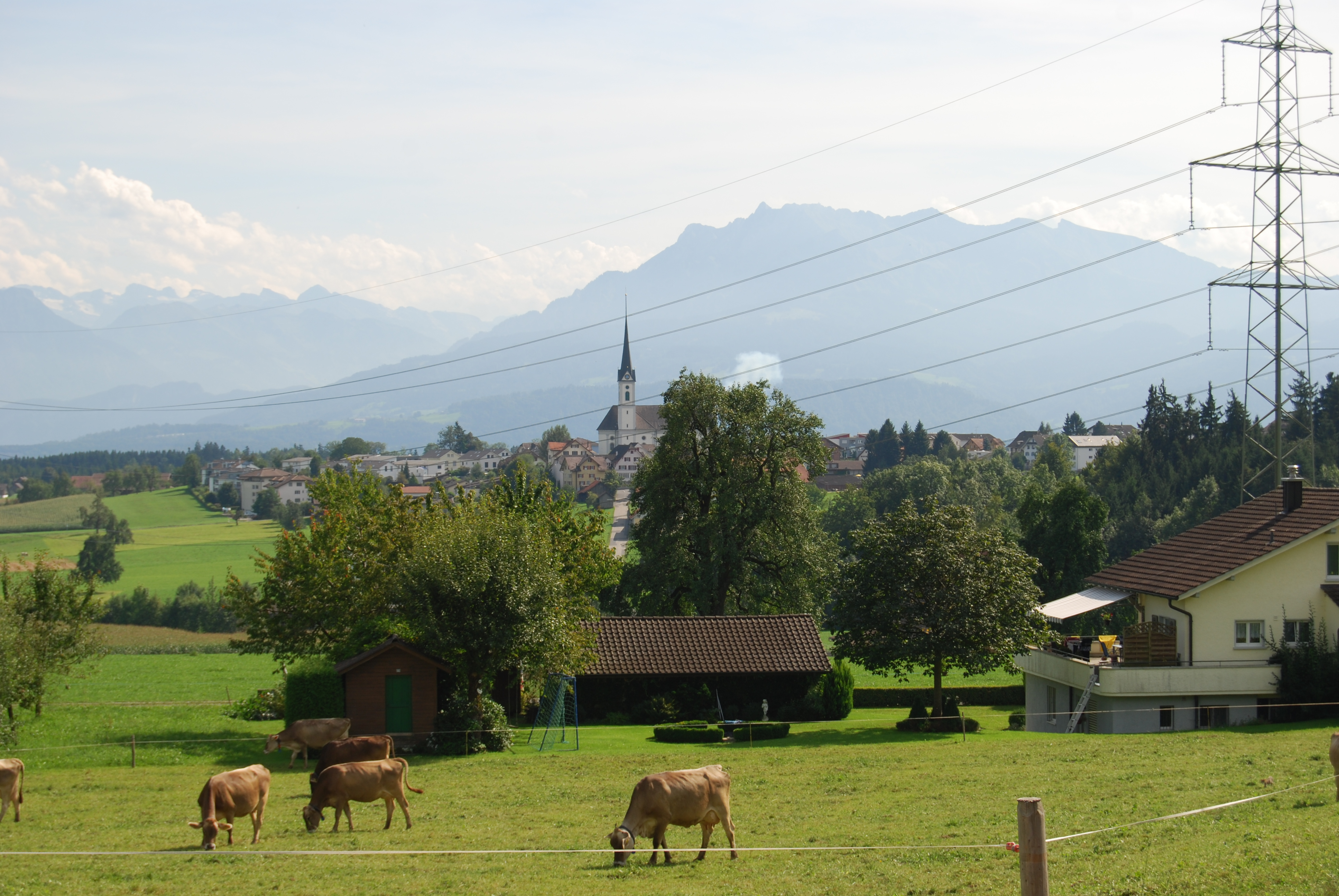

- Coat of arms
- Location of Rain
- Location within Switzerland Location within Canton of Lucerne
- Coordinates: 47°8′N 8°15′E
- Country: Switzerland
- Canton: Lucerne
- District: Hochdorf

Government
  - Mayor: Peter Brunner

Area
  - Total: 9.42 km^{2} (3.64 sq mi)
- Elevation: 582 m (1,909 ft)

Population (December 2007)
  - Total: 2,214
  - Density: 235/km^{2} (609/sq mi)
- Time zone: UTC+01:00 (CET)
  - Summer (DST): UTC+02:00 (CEST)
- Postal code: 6026
- SFOS number: 1037
- ISO 3166 code: CH-LU
- Surrounded by: Eschenbach, Hildisrieden, Hochdorf, Neuenkirch, Römerswil, Rothenburg
- Website: www.rain.ch

Rain (Swiss Standard German pronunciation: [raɪn]) is a municipality in the district of Hochdorf in the canton of Lucerne in Switzerland.

== Geography ==
Aerial view (1952)

Rain has an area of 9.4 km^{2} (3.6 sq mi). Of this area, 74.9% is used for agricultural purposes, while 16.8% is forested. The rest of the land, (8.3%) is settled. In the 1997 land survey, 16.77% of the total land area was forested. Of the agricultural land, 69.64% is used for farming or pastures, while 5.31% is used for orchards or vine crops. Of the settled areas, 5.63% is covered with buildings, 0.32% is industrial, 0.74% is classed as special developments, 0.11% is parks or greenbelts and 1.49% is transportation infrastructure.

== Demographics ==
Rain has a population (as of 2007) of 2,214, of which 5.1% are foreign nationals. Over the last 10 years the population has grown at a rate of 30.9%. Most of the population (as of 2000) speaks German (96.5%), with Albanian being second most common ( 0.7%) and Portuguese being third ( 0.5%).

In the 2007 election the most popular party was the CVP which received 41.6% of the vote. The next three most popular parties were the FDP (26.2%), the SVP (22.6%) and the SPS (3.9%).

The age distribution in Rain is; 652 people or 28.4% of the population is 0–19 years old. 651 people or 28.4% are 20–39 years old, and 761 people or 33.2% are 40–64 years old. The senior population distribution is 175 people or 7.6% are 65–79 years old, 47 or 2% are 80–89 years old and 9 people or 0.4% of the population are 90+ years old.

In Rain about 78.5% of the population (between age 25–64) have completed either non-mandatory upper secondary education or additional higher education (either university or a Fachhochschule).

As of 2000 there are 637 households, of which 141 households (or about 22.1%) contain only a single individual. 110 or about 17.3% are large households, with at least five members. As of 2000 there were 335 inhabited buildings in the municipality, of which 252 were built only as housing, and 83 were mixed use buildings. There were 171 single family homes, 44 double family homes, and 37 multi-family homes in the municipality. Most homes were either two (120) or three (89) story structures. There were only 20 single story buildings and 23 four or more story buildings.

Rain has an unemployment rate of 0.94%. As of 2005, there were 156 people employed in the primary economic sector and about 52 businesses involved in this sector. 157 people are employed in the secondary sector and there are 23 businesses in this sector. 276 people are employed in the tertiary sector, with 45 businesses in this sector. As of 2000 52.2% of the population of the municipality were employed in some capacity. At the same time, females made up 40.9% of the workforce.

In the 2000 census the religious membership of Rain was; 1,580 (86.3%) were Roman Catholic, and 126 (6.9%) were Protestant, with an additional 1 (0.05%) that were of some other Christian faith. There are 23 individuals (1.26% of the population) who are Muslim. Of the rest; there were 9 (0.49%) individuals who belong to another religion, 57 (3.11%) who do not belong to any organized religion, 35 (1.91%) who did not answer the question.
