= Eschenbach, Lucerne =

Eschenbach
- Municipality
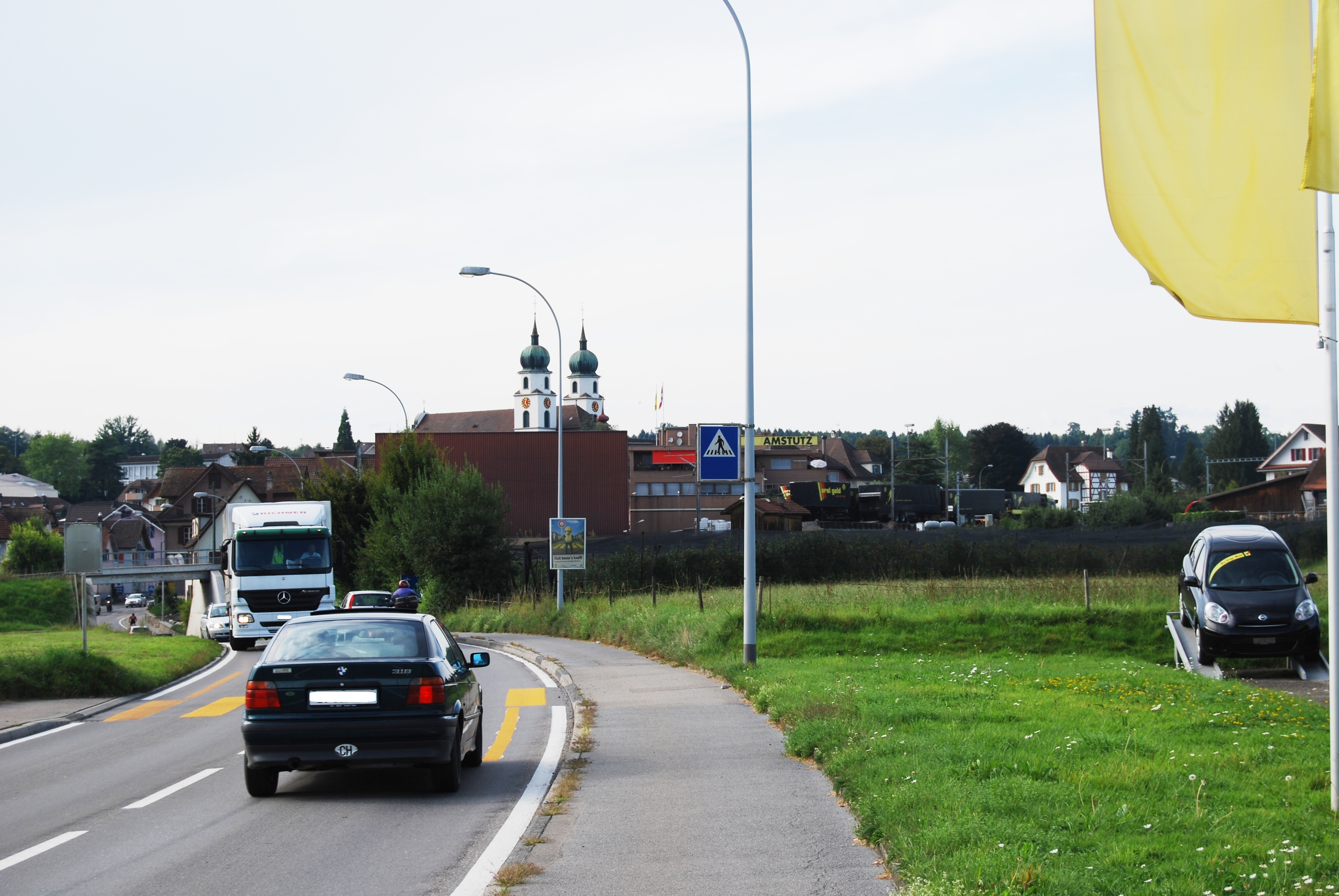

- Coat of arms
- Location of Eschenbach
- Location within Switzerland Location within Canton of Lucerne
- Coordinates: 47°8′N 8°19′E
- Country: Switzerland
- Canton: Lucerne
- District: Hochdorf

Area
  - Total: 13.19 km^{2} (5.09 sq mi)
- Elevation: 473 m (1,552 ft)

Population (December 2020)
  - Total: 3,677
  - Density: 278.8/km^{2} (722.0/sq mi)
- Time zone: UTC+01:00 (CET)
  - Summer (DST): UTC+02:00 (CEST)
- Postal code: 6274
- SFOS number: 1026
- ISO 3166 code: CH-LU
- Surrounded by: Ballwil, Buchrain, Emmen, Hochdorf, Inwil, Rain, Rothenburg
- Website: www.eschenbach-luzern.ch

Eschenbach is a municipality in the district of Hochdorf in the canton of Lucerne in Switzerland.

== History ==
Eschenbach is first mentioned in 924 as Eskinpah or as Essinpahc.

== Coat of arms ==
The blazon of the municipal coat of arms is Or, a Castle Sable ensigned with a cross of four flesh-hooks of the same.

== Geography ==
Aerial view (1970)

Eschenbach is located on the glacier carved plains between the Reuss River and the Seetal valley.

The municipality has an area of 13.2 km^{2} (5.1 sq mi). Of this area, 74.1% is used for agricultural purposes, while 14.5% is forested. Of the rest of the land, 10.5% is settled (buildings or roads) and the remainder (0.8%) is non-productive (rivers, glaciers or mountains). In the 1997 land survey, 14.48% of the total land area was forested. Of the agricultural land, 71.04% is used for farming or pastures, while 3.11% is used for orchards or vine crops. Of the settled areas, 4.4% is covered with buildings, 0.76% is industrial, 2.27% is classed as special developments, 0.53% is parks or greenbelts and 2.58% is transportation infrastructure. Of the unproductive areas, 0.15% is unproductive flowing water (rivers) and 0.68% is other unproductive land.

== Demographics ==
Eschenbach has a population (as of 31 December 2020) of 3,677. As of 2007, 8.2% of the population was made up of foreign nationals. Over the last 10 years the population has grown at a rate of 19.4%. Most of the population (as of 2000) speaks German (94.9%), with Albanian being second most common ( 1.5%) and Italian being third ( 0.8%).

In the 2007 election the most popular party was the CVP which received 40.3% of the vote. The next three most popular parties were the SVP (25.6%), the FDP (22.5%) and the SPS (5.1%).

The age distribution in Eschenbach is; 851 people or 24.7% of the population is 0–19 years old. 915 people or 26.6% are 20–39 years old, and 1,227 people or 35.7% are 40–64 years old. The senior population distribution is 322 people or 9.4% are 65–79 years old, 104 or 3% are 80–89 years old and 20 people or 0.6% of the population are 90+ years old.

The entire Swiss population is generally well educated. In Eschenbach about 77% of the population (between age 25-64) have completed either non-mandatory upper secondary education or additional higher education (either university or a Fachhochschule).

As of 2000 there are 1,070 households, of which 274 households (or about 25.6%) contain only a single individual. 132 or about 12.3% are large households, with at least five members. As of 2000 there were 509 inhabited buildings in the municipality, of which 392 were built only as housing, and 117 were mixed use buildings. There were 266 single family homes, 62 double family homes, and 64 multi-family homes in the municipality. Most homes were either two (205) or three (121) story structures. There were only 33 single story buildings and 33 four or more story buildings.

Eschenbach has an unemployment rate of 1.36%. As of 2005, there were 183 people employed in the primary economic sector and about 58 businesses involved in this sector. 408 people are employed in the secondary sector and there are 40 businesses in this sector. 581 people are employed in the tertiary sector, with 96 businesses in this sector. As of 2000 54.5% of the population of the municipality were employed in some capacity. At the same time, females made up 43.3% of the workforce.

In the 2000 census the religious membership of Eschenbach was; 2,389 (80.5%) were Roman Catholic, and 255 (8.6%) were Protestant, with an additional 31 (1.05%) that were of some other Christian faith. There are 81 individuals (2.73% of the population) who are Muslim. Of the rest; there were 3 (0.1%) individuals who belong to another religion, 106 (3.57%) who do not belong to any organized religion, 101 (3.41%) who did not answer the question.

The historical population is given in the following table:

year	population
About 1695	c. 400
1798	1,097
1816	790
1850	1,229
1900	1,204
1950	1,656
2000	2,966
