= Huwyl Burg =

Castle in Lucerne, Switzerland

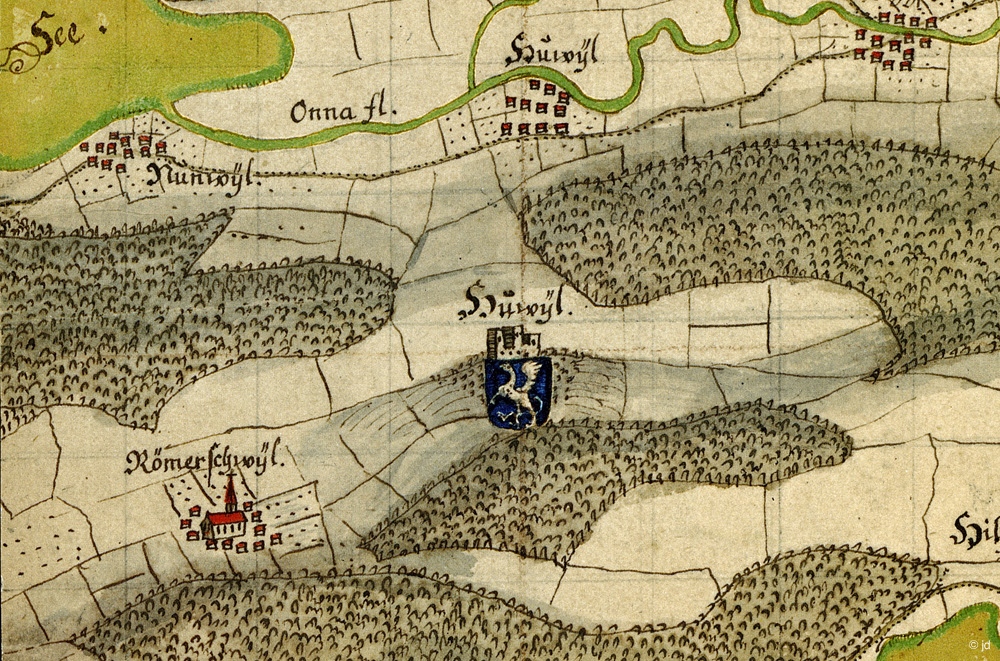
1667 Hans Conrad Gyger Map

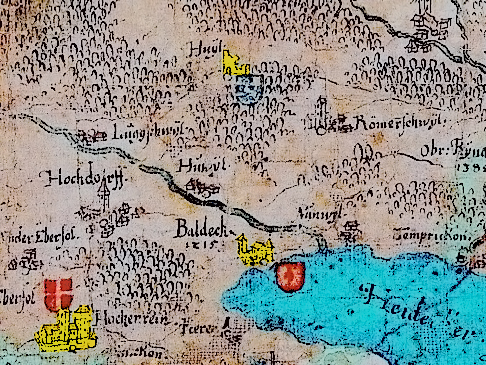
Lucern Canton Map by Cysat & Wägmann 1613

Huwyl Burg was a castle built between Römerswil and Hochdorf, nearby Lake Baldegg (Canton of Lucern, Switzerland). It was the stronghold of the family Huwyler. The castle is shown on the 1613 Lucern map by Cysat and Wägmann the 1667 map by Hans Conrad Gyger of the area. However, it is not included in latter maps. Its ruins were excavated in 1902 and they can be visited.

== See also ==
- List of castles and fortresses in Switzerland
