= Château de Reinach =

Château in Hirtzbach, France

Coordinates: 47.5981°N 7.2243°E

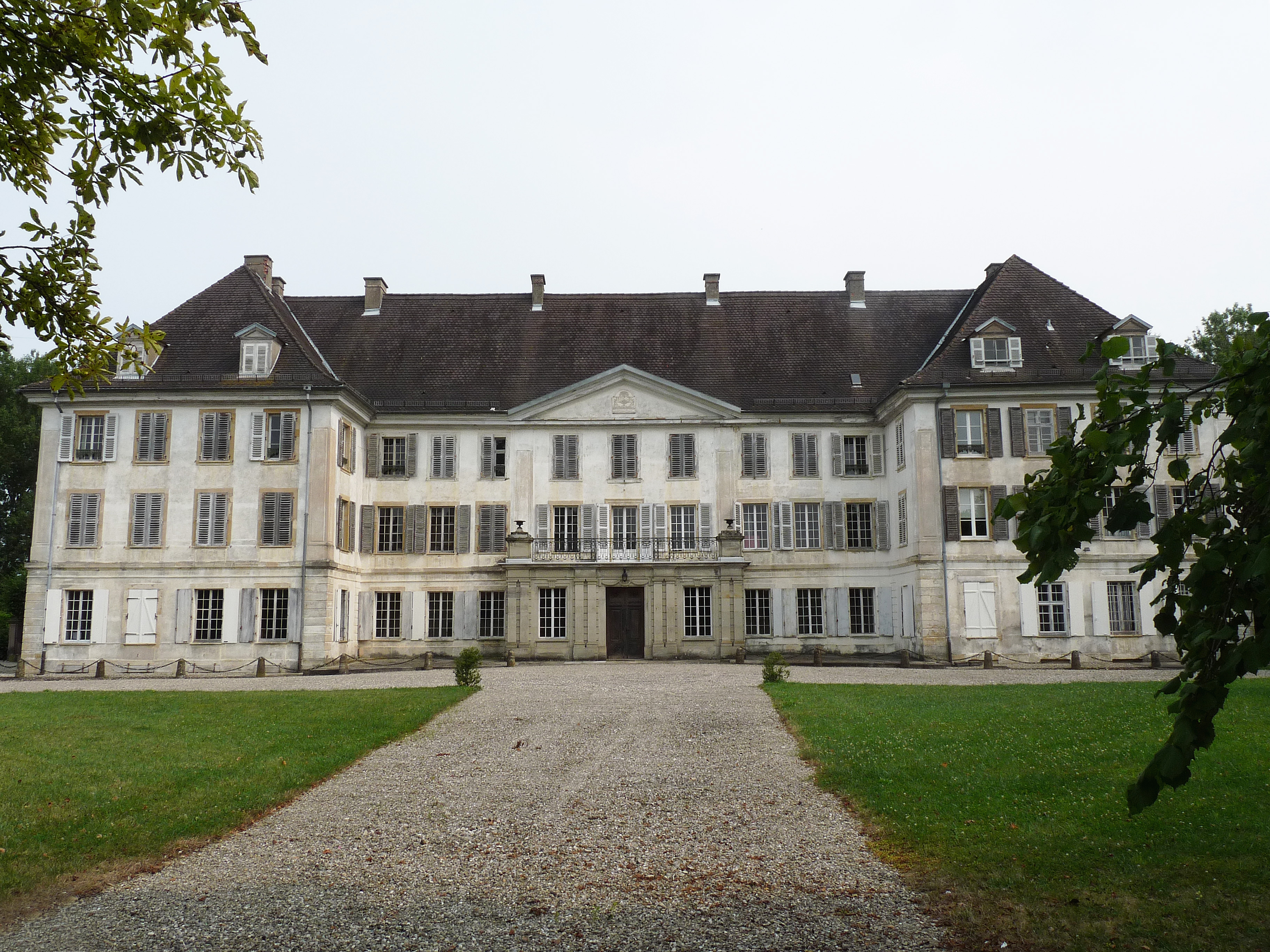
Facade of Château de Reinach

Château de Reinach is a château in the commune of Hirtzbach, in the department of Haut-Rhin, Alsace, France. It is a listed historical monument since 1990.
