= Stämpfli (publisher) =

Swiss printing and publishing house

Stämpfli AG
- Native name: Stämpfli Group AG
- Industry: Printing & Publishing
- Founded: 1599
- Headquarters: Wölflistrasse 1, 3001 Bern, Switzerland
- Key people: Dr. Rudolf Stämpfli
- Number of employees: 360 (2020)
- Website: www.staempfli.com/en

Stämpfli Group AG is a Swiss graphic arts company and a publishing house based in Bern. The Group includes 5 subsidiaries and employs about 420 people. The company origin dates back to 1599 and today it is run by the 6th generation of the same family, brothers Rudolf and Peter Stämpfli. It is one of the oldest continuously operating companies in the World.

== Production ==
The main business of the Group, provided by Stämpfli AG, includes the design, creation, production and logistics of publications and the integration of publishing systems.

Stämpfli All Media AG developed and licensed software for database-based communication solutions and systems for content management at home and abroad and provided hosting and other IT services. In 2012, it was integrated into Stämpfli Publikationen AG.

The Stämpfli GmbH subsidiary in Bregenz is a specialist for the development, implementation and maintenance of standardized, individually configured product information management (PIM) solutions and the further development of the PIM software mediaSolution3.

With Stämpfli Verlag AG, the group is also active as a book publisher. It publishes printed and electronic information in the field of law and political science. Stämpfli Verlag is affiliated with a mail-order company and is also a co-owner of the Swiss-based legal database Swisslex. Stämpfli Verlag is the Swiss member of LPE Law Publishers in Europe.

Stämpfli Polska Sp. z o.o. produces printed and electronic publications for Polish customers as a communications agency and media prepress.

== See also ==
- List of oldest companies
