= Ernst Hodel junior =

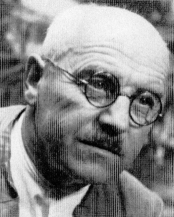
Ernst Hodel Junior 1881-1955

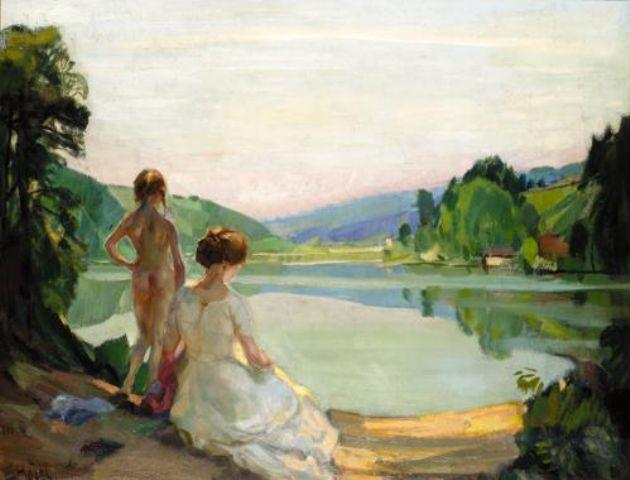
Gemälde ohne Titel, ca. 1915

Ernst Hodel junior (July 29, 1881 – October 5, 1955) was a Swiss painter and son of the landscapist Ernst Hodel senior.

== Life ==
He was born in Lucerne, Switzerland. Like his father before him, Ernst Hodel (the younger) quickly developed a great dedication and love to painting in his early youth. Having always been fascinated by the work of his father, he announced after finishing school that he wanted to follow in his footsteps. However, his father did not echo his enthusiasm for a career of his own. The boy nevertheless continued to help out in the studio occasional pursuing personal projects and painted whatever his passion urged him to. During this time - before his twenties - the young man created a panoramic view of the Mont-Blanc for his father’s museum entirely on his own. The important question of his future however remained undecided. Then one day, as luck would have it, Ferdinand Hodler - the famous Swiss painter - visited his old friend Ernst Hodel senior, who showed him some of his son’s work.

His father may have never shared Hodler’s praise for Ernst Hodel junior’s work, but soon after he allowed his son to start an apprenticeship at the Royal Academy of Fine Arts in Munich. Once he had finished his studies, his travels lead him to Paris and Milan; this was however cut short, as only a few years later his father died and he returned to Lucerne. Indeed, he had to, for he shared his father’s passion for the pastoral and idyllic landscape of the Innerschweiz and also wanted to finish his monumental work, that is the large scale panoramic views of the Alps in the Alpineum.

== Literature ==
- Carl Brun: Schweizerisches Künstler-Lexikon. Band 2, Huber, Frauenfeld 1908.
