= Huwyl =

Coordinates: 47.168°N 8.275°E

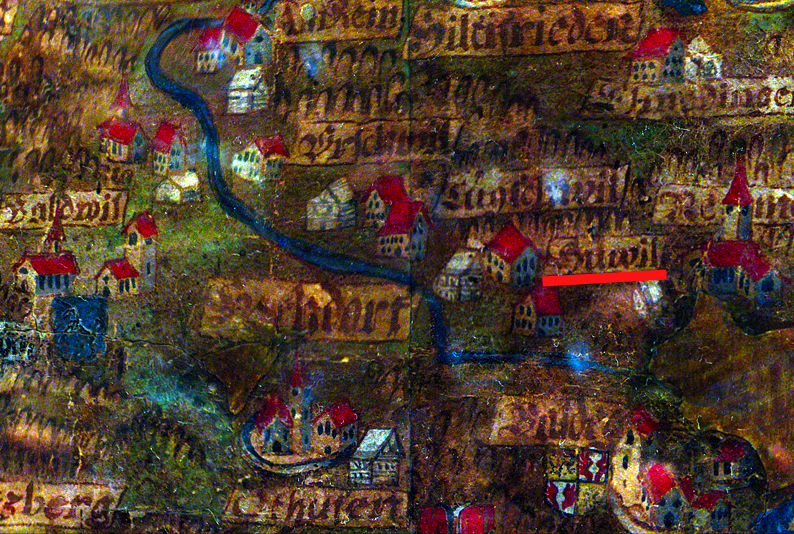
Wägemann Map 1614 (Seetal Area)

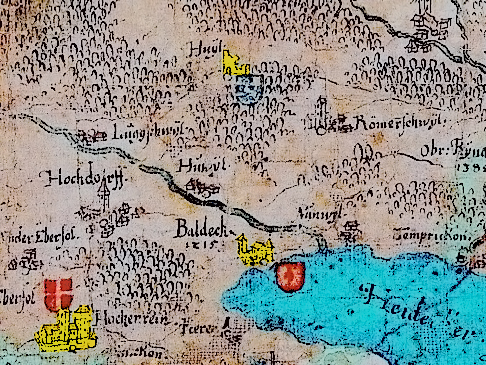
Map by Cysat Waegmann

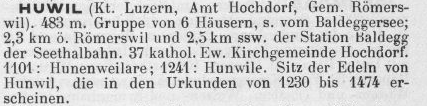
Geographisches Lexikon der Schweiz Huwyl Entry

Huwyl is a hamlet of Römerswil in the district Hochdorf in the canton Lucerne in Switzerland. It is located 2 km (1.2 mi) to the east from Hochdorf and 2 km (1.2 mi) from Römerswil. The hamlet is incorporated into the Municipality of Römerswil.

The hamlet name changed from Hueneweilare (1101) and Hunenweilare (1241) to Huwil. From 1230 to 1474, this town seated to the Lords of Hunwil. They lived in Huwyl Burg.
