= Beat Huwyler =

Swiss-born Reformist theologian (born 1961)

- Born: 1 January 1961 (age 65); Aargau, Switzerland
- Occupation: Professor
- Notable work: Easter Monday, Jeremiah and the People
- Theological work
- Era: 20th century
- Tradition or movement: Evangelical Reformed Church in Germany

Beat Huwyler (born 1 January 1961) is a Swiss-born Reformist theologian who taught at the University of Basel. Huwyler received a Doctor of Theology degree in 1995 after completing his thesis about the Book of Jeremiah. He was editor of the evangelical magazine "Life & Faith" from 2006 to 2008. He directed a research program founded by the Swiss National Science Foundation at the University of Basel. He edited the book "Easter Monday" in 2008 and wrote "Jeremiah and the People" in 1997, articulating the criterion that changes in biblical books must be repeated and serve a discernible and unifying purpose.

== Ministry ==
In 1991, Huwyler became Pastor in the Evangelical Reformed Church of Basel-Stadt after completing advanced theologian studies in Basel and Lucerne.
