= Walter von Moos =

Swiss industrialist

- Born: October 21, 1918; Lucerne, Switzerland
- Died: January 5, 2016 (aged 97)
- Education: ETH Zürich
- Occupation: Industrialist (steel)
- Known for: Majority owner of von Moos Steel
- Spouse: Marcelle Sophie Maria Schnyder von Wartensee
- Children: 1

Walter von Moos (October 21, 1918 - January 5, 2016) was a Swiss industrialist and majority owner of von Moos Steel, which in 1996 became Swiss Steel and subsequently in 2006 merged with Schmolz + Bickenbach. The company was one of the oldest privately owned manufacturing companies in Switzerland.

== Early life and education ==
Walter von Moos was born October 21, 1918, in Lucerne, Switzerland to Ludwig (1877–1956) and Alice (née Zetter; 1884–1970). His father was a great-grandson of one of the company founders and a then director at von Moos'sche Eisenwerke (Moos Steel Works) which operated as a stock corporation.

== Career ==
In 1949, after studying chemical engineering at ETH Zürich, he joined the family business Moos Steel works in Emmen near Lucerne, and transformed it into von Moos Stahl AG. He became a director from 1979–1988 and chairman of the board of directors 1988–1993. Under his leadership, the company added a new rolling mill in 1980 and became active worldwide.

== Family ==
Von Moos married the aristocrat Marcelle Sophie Maria Schnyder von Wartensee (1920–1999). They had a son, André in 1949.

== Literature ==
- 100 Jahre von Moos'sche Eisenwerke Luzern 1842-1942
