= Bercow =

Bercow /ˈbɜːrkoʊ/ is a surname, Anglicized from Berkowitz, see John Bercow § Early life and education. Notable people with the surname include:

- John Bercow (born 1963), British politician and speaker of the House of Commons (2009–2019)
- Sally Bercow (née Illman), the wife of John Bercow

== See also ==
- Bercu (disambiguation)
- Berkhof (surname)
- Berko (disambiguation)
- Berkoff
- Berkov
- Berkowitz
- Berkovich
