= Olst railway station =

Railway station in the Netherlands

Olst
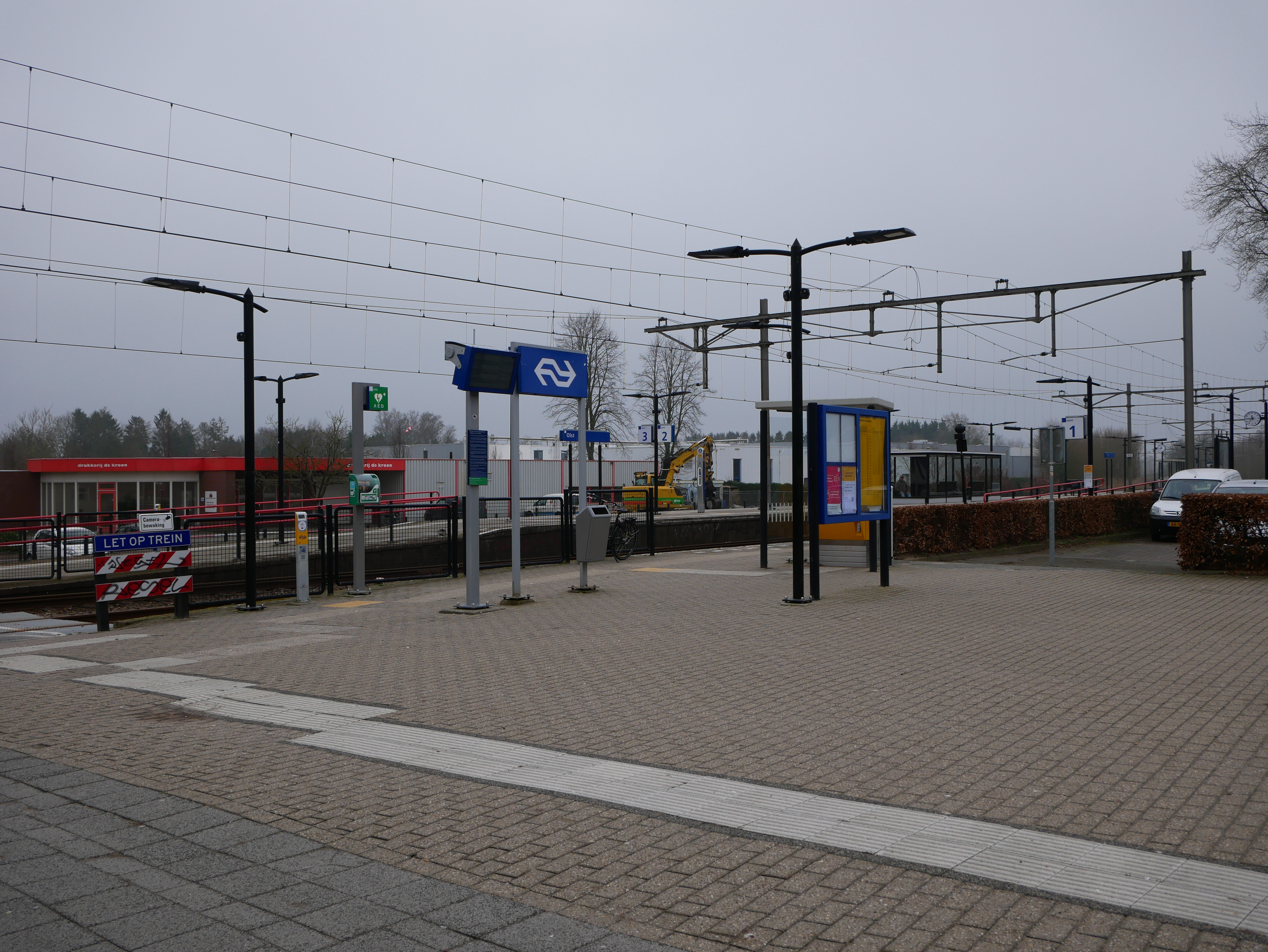

General information
- Location: Netherlands
- Coordinates: 52°20′06″N 6°06′47″E
- Line: Arnhem–Leeuwarden railway

Services
Preceding station	Nederlandse Spoorwegen	Following station
Deventer towards Roosendaal	NS Intercity 3600	Wijhe towards Zwolle
Location
- Location within Netherlands

Olst is a railway station located in Olst, Olst-Wijhe, the Netherlands. The station was opened on 1 October 1866 and is located on the Deventer - Zwolle section of the Arnhem–Leeuwarden railway. The train services are operated by Nederlandse Spoorwegen. The station lies in the centre of Olst. The station was closed between 15 May 1936 and 1 June 1940.

== Train services ==
As of 11 December 2016, the following train services call at this station:

- 2× per hour express Intercity service: Zwolle - Deventer - Arnhem - Nijmegen - 's-Hertogenbosch - Roosendaal

== Bus service ==
There is a bus stop near the station on the Jan Schamhartstraat called Centrum.

- 161 - Deventer - Diepenveen - Boskamp - Olst - Den Nul -Wijhe - Windesheim - Ittersum - Zwolle
