= Berghof =

Berghof or Berghoff may refer to:

- Berghof (residence), Adolf Hitler's home in the mountains of Bavaria
- Berghof (Sölden), a residence and former farmstead in Austria
- Berghof (Vienna), a Roman settlement in Vienna, Austria
- Berghof, Lucerne, a former municipality in the canton of Lucerne, Switzerland
- The Berghof Foundation, a peacekeeping organization based in Germany
- The Berghoff (restaurant), Chicago, US, or its founder Herman Berghoff
- Berghoff, a beer brewed by the Joseph Huber Brewing Company
- German exonym for the city of Brocēni, Latvia
- The fictional sanatorium in Thomas Mann's novel The Magic Mountain

== People ==
- Dagmar Berghoff (born 1943), German journalist
- Henry C. Berghoff (1856–1925), German-American businessman and politician

== See also ==
- Berkhoff (surname)
- Berkhof (disambiguation)
- Berkoff (disambiguation)
