= Berkhof =

Berkhof, Berkhoff or Berkoff may refer to:

- Berkoff (surname), a surname of Eastern European origin
- Berkhof or Berkhoff, a surname of Dutch and German origin
- VDL Berkhof, a Dutch manufacturer of buses
- Berkhof (Wedemark), a town in Wedemark, Lower Saxony, Germany

== See also ==
- Berghof (disambiguation) (includes Berghoff)
