= Berkova =

Berkova may refer to:

- Berkova, feminine of the Russian surname Berkov
- Berková, feminine of the Czech surname Berka (surname)

== See also ==
- Berkovo
