= Olst-Wijhe =

- Municipality
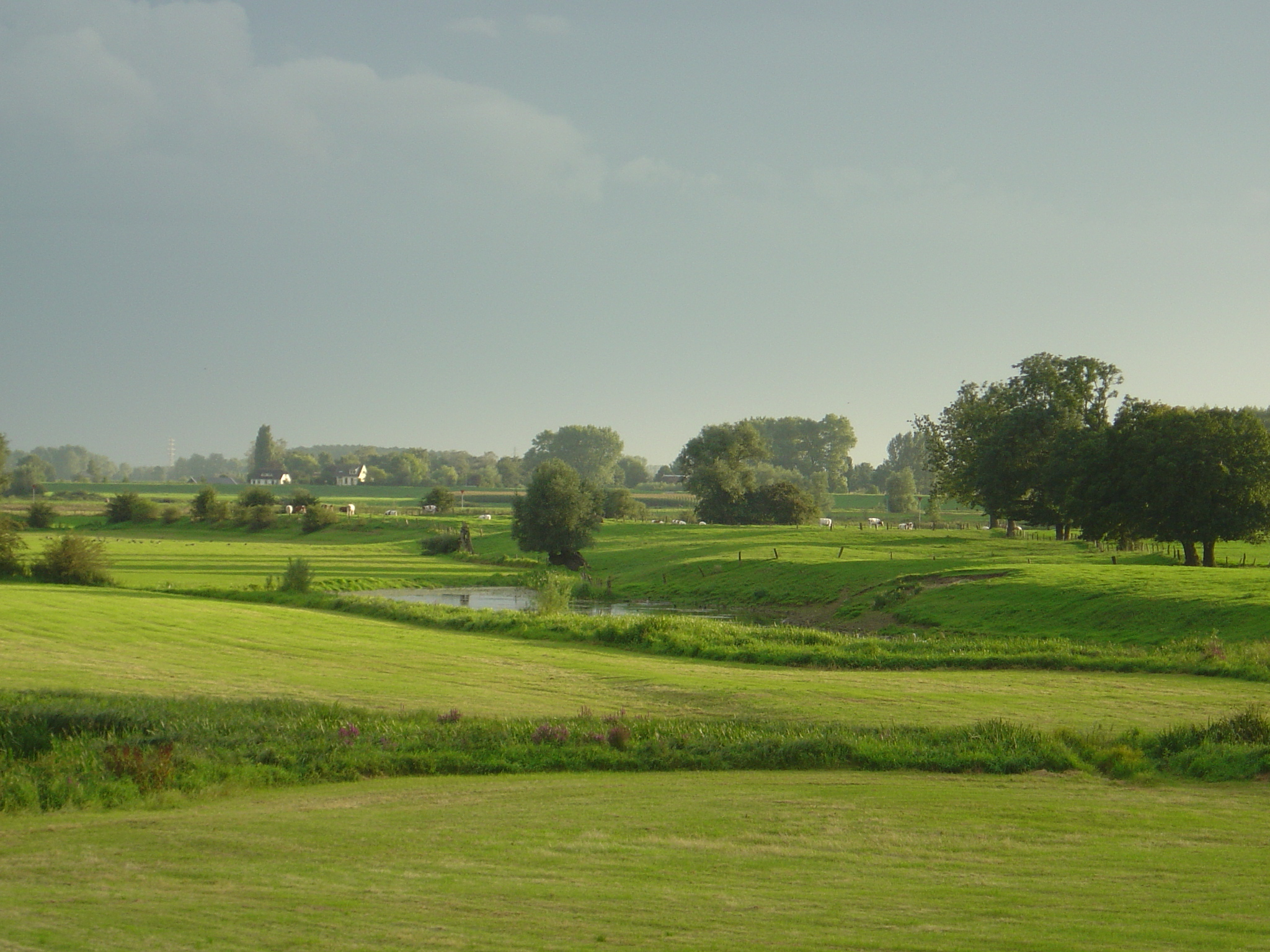
- Polders in Olst-Wijhe

- Flag Coat of arms

- Location in Overijssel
- Coordinates: 52°20′N 6°7′E
- Country: Netherlands
- Province: Overijssel

Government
  - Body: Municipal council
  - Mayor: Sietske Poepjes (CDA)

Area
  - Total: 118.37 km^{2} (45.70 sq mi)
  - Land: 113.84 km^{2} (43.95 sq mi)
  - Water: 4.53 km^{2} (1.75 sq mi)
- Elevation: 4 m (13 ft)

Population (January 2021)
  - Total: 18,361
  - Density: 161/km^{2} (420/sq mi)
- Time zone: UTC+1 (CET)
  - Summer (DST): UTC+2 (CEST)
- Postcode: 8120–8139, 8195–8199
- Area code: 0570, 0578
- Website: www.olst-wijhe.nl

Olst-Wijhe (pronounced [ɔlst ˈʋɛiə]) is a municipality in the province of Overijssel, eastern Netherlands. It borders the Overijssel municipalities of Zwolle to the north, Raalte to the north and east and Deventer to the south; and the Gelderland municipalities of Voorst, Epe and Heerde to the west.

== History and economic activities ==
Both of the municipality's main towns, Olst and Wijhe, are old towns. Olst, which is believed to have been founded in the 7th century, is first mentioned in chronicles in 947 (as "Holsto"), Wijhe in 960 (as "Wie"). Traditionally, agriculture (fruit and cereals), cattle, meat processing and the production of bricks in open-air brickworks along river IJssel were the prime sources of income in the area.

Nowadays, Olst and Wijhe are mainly commuter residences for people working in Deventer and Zwolle respectively; both towns have had a railroad station on the Zwolle–Nijmegen main line (route 3600) since 1866. The surrounding land still relies heavily on agriculture. There is some small industry in Olst (machinery manufacturing) and Wijhe (meat processing).

=== Merger of municipalities ===
The present municipality was created on 1 January 2001 through the merger of the two former municipalities of Olst and Wijhe as part of a nationwide bid to reduce administrative overhead on the municipal level. The newly merged municipality retained the name of its largest constituent part, Olst, pending approval of a definitive new name. After proposed neutral names containing neither "Olst" nor "Wijhe" met with little enthusiasm, it was decided to simply name the municipality Olst-Wijhe as of 26 March 2002.

A new town hall is being built on the southern outskirts of Wijhe.

== Geographical features ==
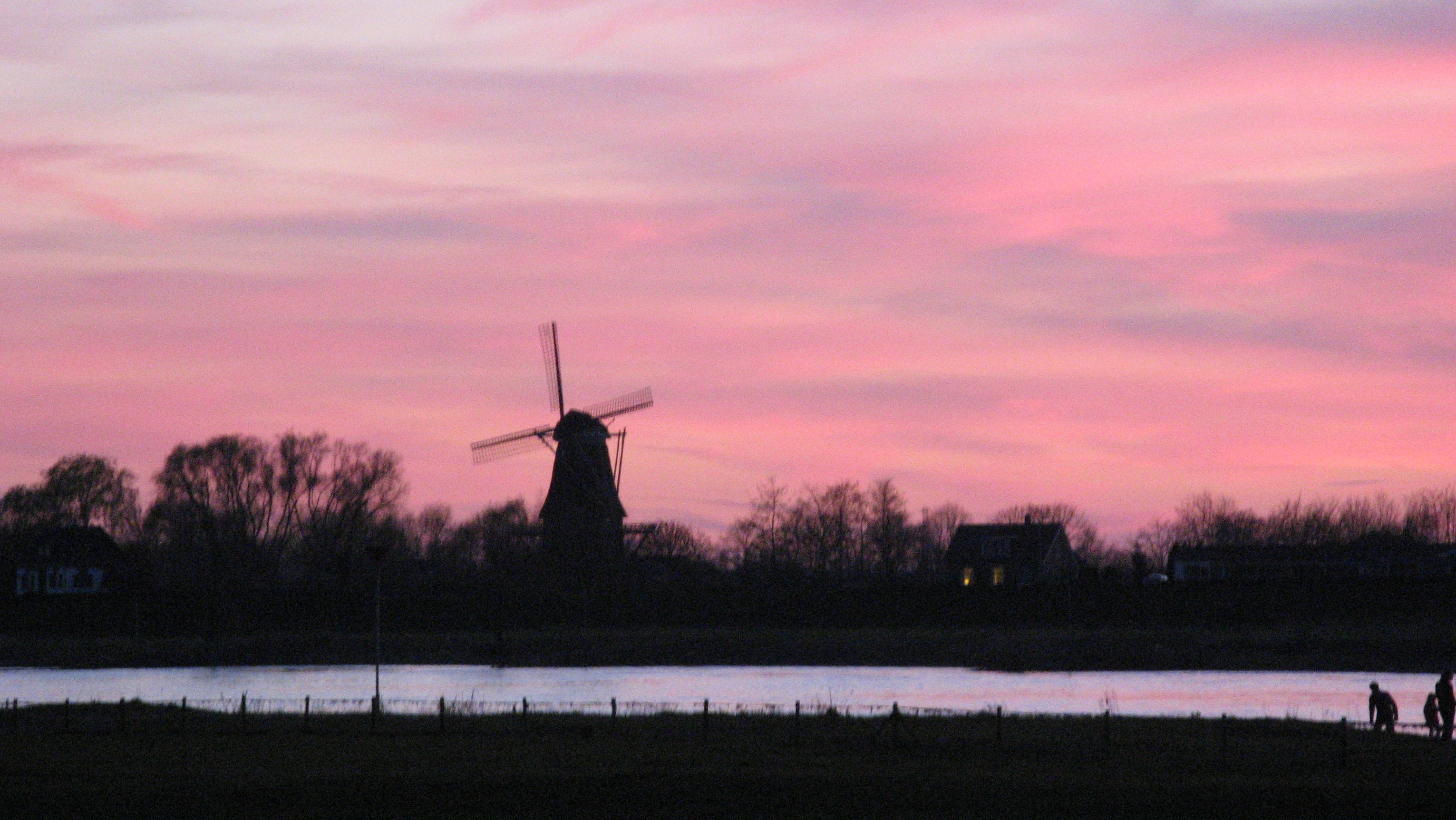
IJssel River

Olst-Wijhe is dominated by river IJssel, which partly flows through it and partly forms the border between the provinces Overijssel and Gelderland. Although this border largely runs along river IJssel, there are two left-bank exclaves opposite the towns of Olst and Wijhe, in which the villages of Welsum and Welsumerveld (south exclave) and Marle (north exclave) are situated. There are cable ferries between Olst and Welsum and between Wijhe and Vorchten in the municipality of Heerde (there is no direct connection between Marle and the rest of Overijssel).

Olst-Wijhe is part of the low-lying Salland region. The one metre above mean sea level contour line runs roughly parallel to the river; the municipality's interior is characterised by flat or gently rolling grasslands and woodlands at about 10–15 metres above mean sea level.

Apart from river IJssel, several more streams flow through the municipality's territory. They are called wetering ("drainage waterway") and are amalgamations of natural streams gradually channelised from the 18th century onwards and specifically dug canals . From west to east, these are Zandwetering, Soestwetering, Groote Vloedgraven, Oude Wetering and Nieuwe Wetering. All these streams flow in a south–north direction and come together at one point or other to eventually form the Zwarte Water river near the city of Zwolle. On the left side of river IJssel, near the exclave of Welsum, there are several more wetering streams, all but one of them on the Gelderland side of the border; the exception being the easternmost of these, the Terwoldsche Wetering, which forms the border between Olst-Wijhe and Voorst.

== Population centres ==
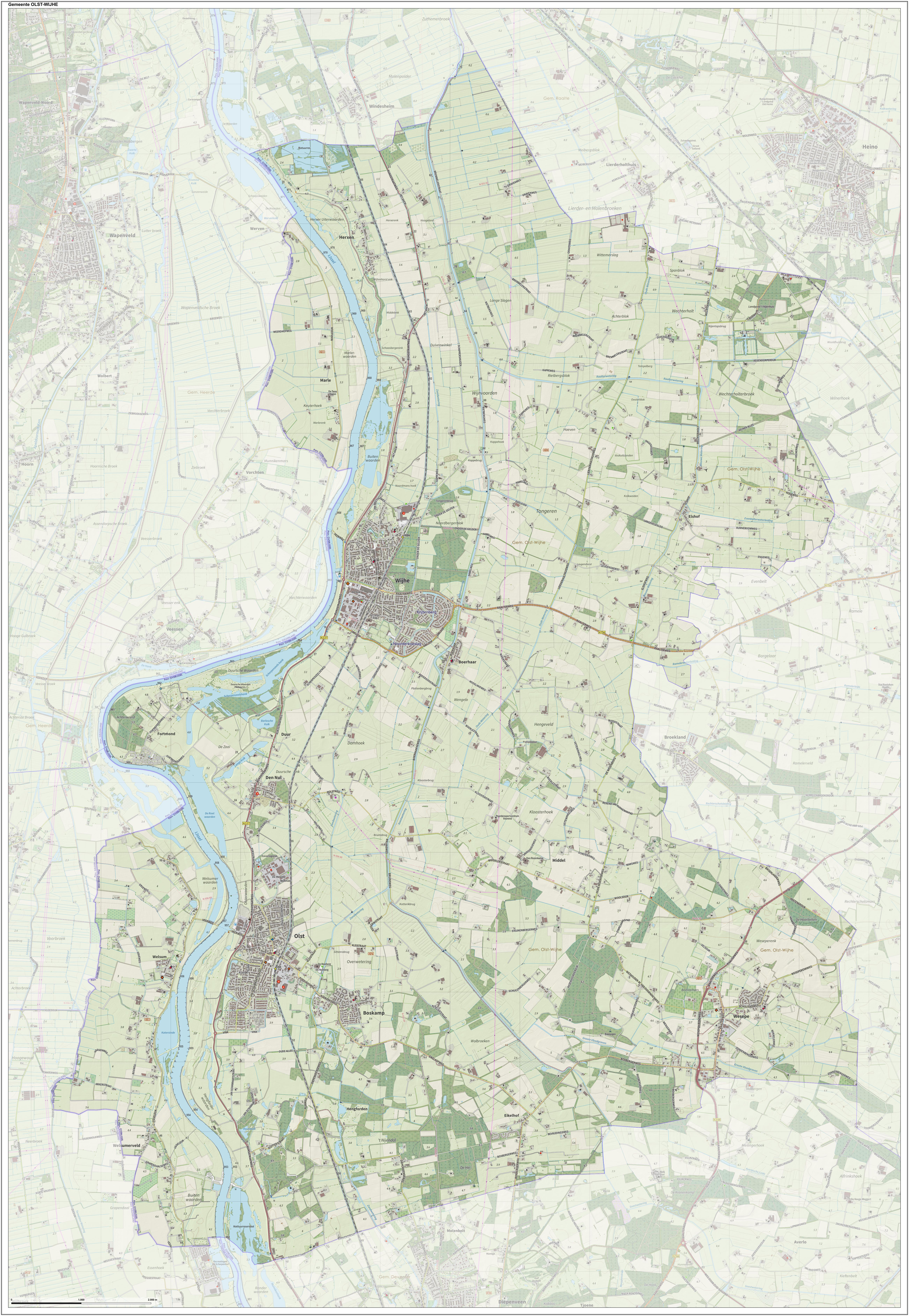
Dutch Topographic map of Olst-Wijhe, June 2015

The municipality consists of the following statistical areas (2010 population figures with difference from 2009 figures):

- Boerhaar (765, +33)
- Boskamp (1,265, +174, includes Hengforden)
- Den Nul (890, +322, includes Fortmond and Duur)
- Eikelhof (340, +45)
- Elshof (765, +292)
- Herxen (415, +95)
- Marle (75, −1)
- Middel (350, +137)
- Olst (5,225, +111)
- Welsum (605, +/-0, includes Welsumerveld)
- Wesepe (1,155, −51)
- Wijhe (5,690, −414)

== Transportation ==
- Railway stations: Olst, Wijhe

== Attractions ==
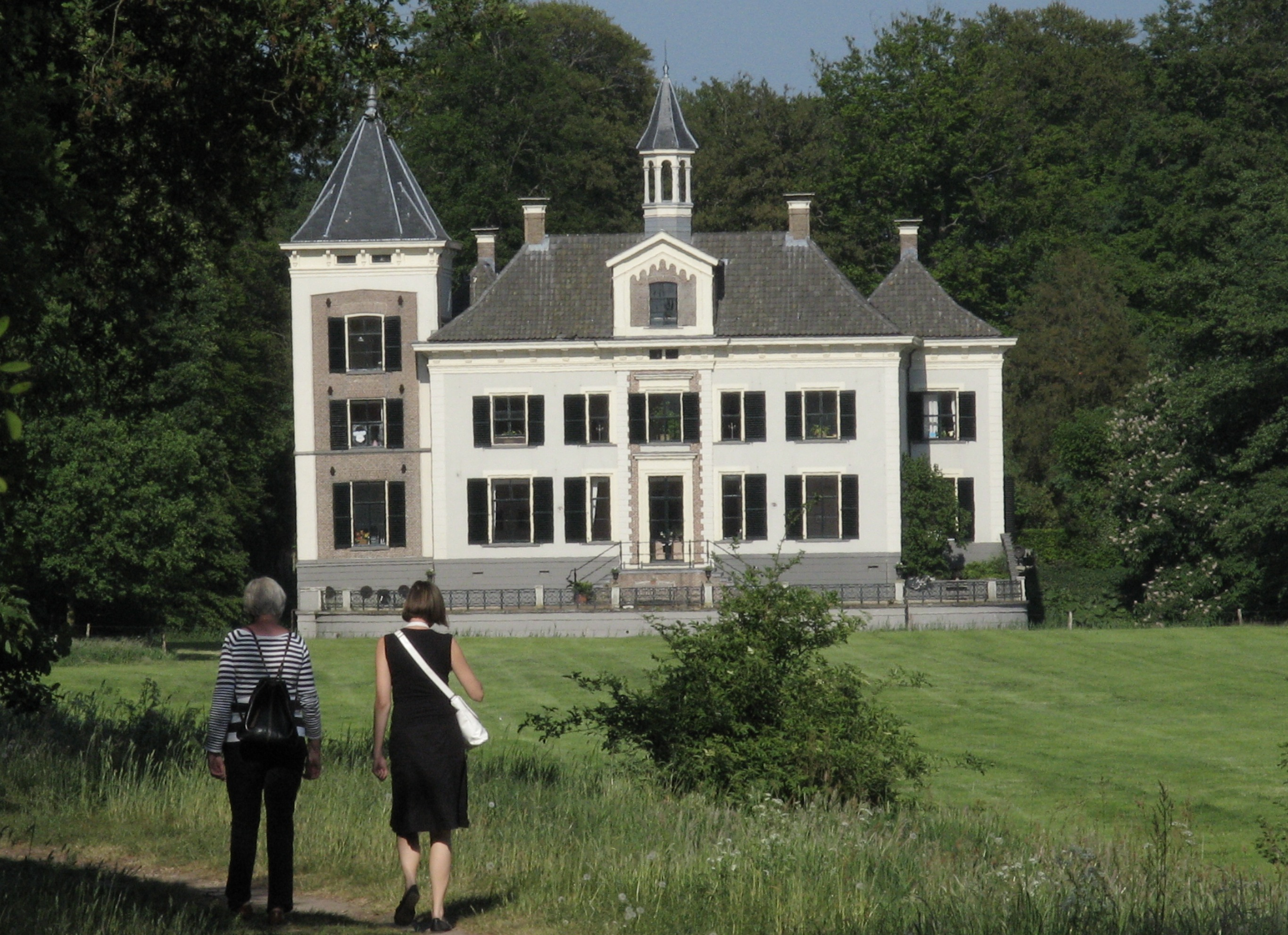
Mansion de Haere

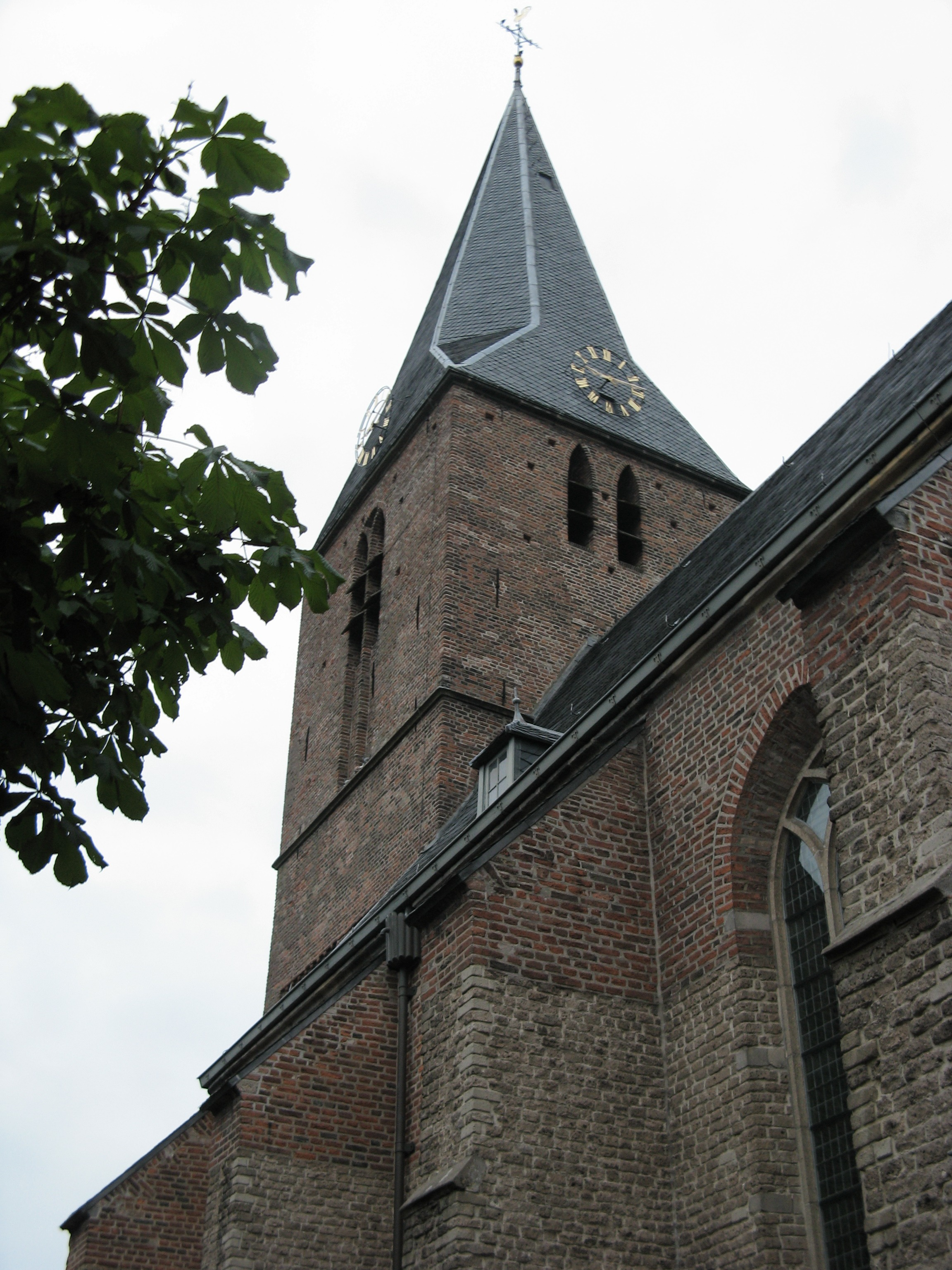
Church of Olst

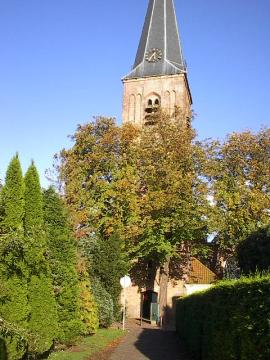
Protestant Church of Wijhe

=== Mansions and windmills ===
There are numerous mansions and country houses strewn around the municipality, most of them built in the 18th century. These include Groot Hoenlo, Klein Hoenlo, Nijendal, De Haere, Wijnbergen, De Hei and Nijenhuis. The mansions themselves are generally still inhabited or used for commercial purposes and so cannot be visited, but their grounds are open to visitors to stroll around.

The mansion of Nijenhuis (near the border with Raalte) has been converted into an art gallery (a.o. Permeke, Van Gogh) with sculpture garden (a.o. Zadkine). There are windmills at Welsum, Olst (two), Boskamp, Wesepe, Marle and Wijhe (two). Of these, the ones at Welsum, Olst (one), Marle and Wijhe (one) are still fully functional.

=== Eikelhof ===
- The murder cross, erected in medieval times to commemorate/atone for a highway murder and source of many apocryphal mythical stories. It bears the legend:

INT JAER UNSES HEREN MCCCC EN XCIII

STIERF HIER JOHAN LUCKENS
BID VOER DE SELE

(In the year of Our Lord 1493 | Johan Luckens died here | pray for the soul)

- A small museum of regional geology halfway between Eikelhof and Boskamp

=== Fortmond ===
- The Fortmond Natural Reserve along the IJssel river

=== Olst ===
- A Romanesque Protestant church completed in 1264, partly built from its predecessor's sandstone, otherwise from brick
- Het Baken van Overijssel ("The Overijssel Beacon"), an installation of modern art made of aluminium at the eastern bank of river IJssel, signifying the entrance to Overijssel province

=== Welsum ===
- Welsum has a saddle-roofed Protestant church (19th-century nave, 16th-century steeple)

== Notable people ==
- Harmen Jansen Knickerbocker (ca. 1648 – ca. 1720) a Dutch colonist in New Netherland
- Jean Jacques Rambonnet (1864 in Wijhe – 1943) a Dutch naval officer, politician and Chief Scout
- Gerrit Berkhoff (1901 in Wijhe – 1996) a Dutch chemist and academic
- Conny Stuart (1913 in Wijhe – 2010) a Dutch actress, singer and cabaretière
- Danique Kerkdijk (born 1996 in Olst) a Dutch footballer who plays for Brighton & Hove Albion WFC
