= Boskamp =

Boskamp may refer to:

- Boskamp, Suriname, a town in Saramacca District
- Boskamp, Overijssel, a village in the municipality of Olst-Wijhe, Netherlands
- SV Boskamp, a Surinamese football club

== People with the surname Boskamp ==
- Hans Boskamp (1932–2011), Dutch footballer
- Johan Boskamp (born 1948), Dutch footballer
