= Berkos =

Berkos is a surname. Notable people with the surname include:

- Mykhaylo Berkos (1861–1919), Ukrainian artist
- Peter Berkos (1922–2024), American sound editor
- Kristen Berkos (1974-), American Communication Professor

== See also ==
- Berko
