= Berkov =

Berkov or Berkoff is a surname of Jewish (Berkovich) or Dutch/German origin (Berkhoff). In Slavic countries it is only used for men, while the feminine variant is Berkova. Please keep in mind that "Berková" is a Czech-language feminine of the surname Berka. Notable people with the name include:

- David Berkoff (born 1966), an American swimmer
- Steven Berkoff (born 1937), an English actor
- Vasily Berkov (1794–1870), Russian shipbuilder
- Elena Berkova (born 1985), Russian model, television presenter, singer and actress
- Katharine Berkoff (born 2001), American swimmer, daughter of David

== See also ==
- Bercow
