= Berko =

Berko may refer to:

- 95179 Berkó, an asteroid
- Berkhamsted, a town in Hertfordshire, UK
- Berko (surname)
