= Wijhe railway station =

Railway station in the Netherlands

Wijhe

General information
- Location: Netherlands
- Coordinates: 52°23′37″N 6°08′27″E

Services
Preceding station	Nederlandse Spoorwegen	Following station
Olst towards Roosendaal	NS Intercity 3600	Zwolle Terminus
Location
- Location within Netherlands

Wijhe is a railway station located in Wijhe, Olst-Wijhe, The Netherlands. The station was opened on 1 October 1866 and is located on the Deventer - Zwolle section of the Arnhem–Leeuwarden railway. The train services are operated by Nederlandse Spoorwegen. The station was closed between 15 May 1936 and 1 June 1940.

== Train services ==
As of 11 December 2016, the following train services call at this station:

- 2× per hour express Intercity service: Zwolle - Deventer - Arnhem - Nijmegen - 's-Hertogenbosch - Breda - Roosendaal
