= Welsum, Olst-Wijhe =

Welsum
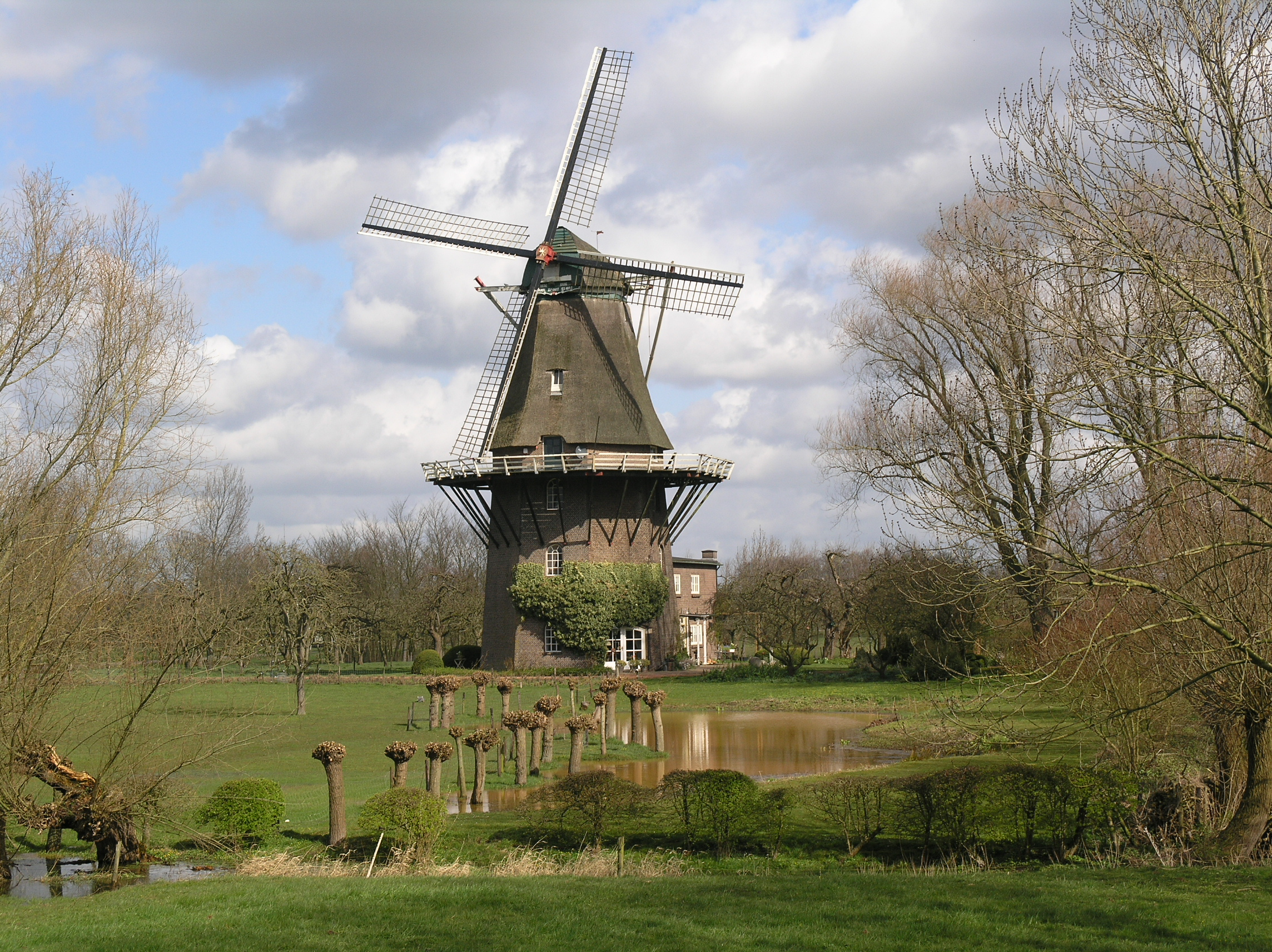
- Houdt Braef Stant – the mill in Welsum, built in 1856

- Location in the province of Overijssel in the Netherlands Welsum (Netherlands)
- Coordinates: 52°20′09″N 6°05′28″E
- Country: Netherlands
- Province: Overijssel
- Municipality: Olst-Wijhe

Area
  - Total: 8.89 km^{2} (3.43 sq mi)
- Elevation: 5 m (16 ft)

Population (2021)
  - Total: 625
  - Density: 70.3/km^{2} (182/sq mi)
- Time zone: UTC+1 (CET)
  - Summer (DST): UTC+2 (CEST)
- Postal code: 8196
- Dialing code: 0570

Welsum (Dutch pronunciation: [ˈʋɛlsʏm]) is a village on the left bank of the river IJssel in the present municipality of Olst-Wijhe in the Dutch province of Overijssel.

The village is the source of the Welsummer chicken breed. In 2001, a number of farms culled their flocks in connection with the outbreak of foot-and-mouth disease.

The earliest existing written mention of the village (as Wilsum, kerspel Olst) dates from 1295. The tower of the Protestant church was built around 1475. The village's flour mill, Houdt Braef Stant, dates to 1856, with restorations in 1963 (using internal parts from the mill Wippe in Hellendoorn) and 1986. It is currently being used as a dwelling.

== Gallery ==
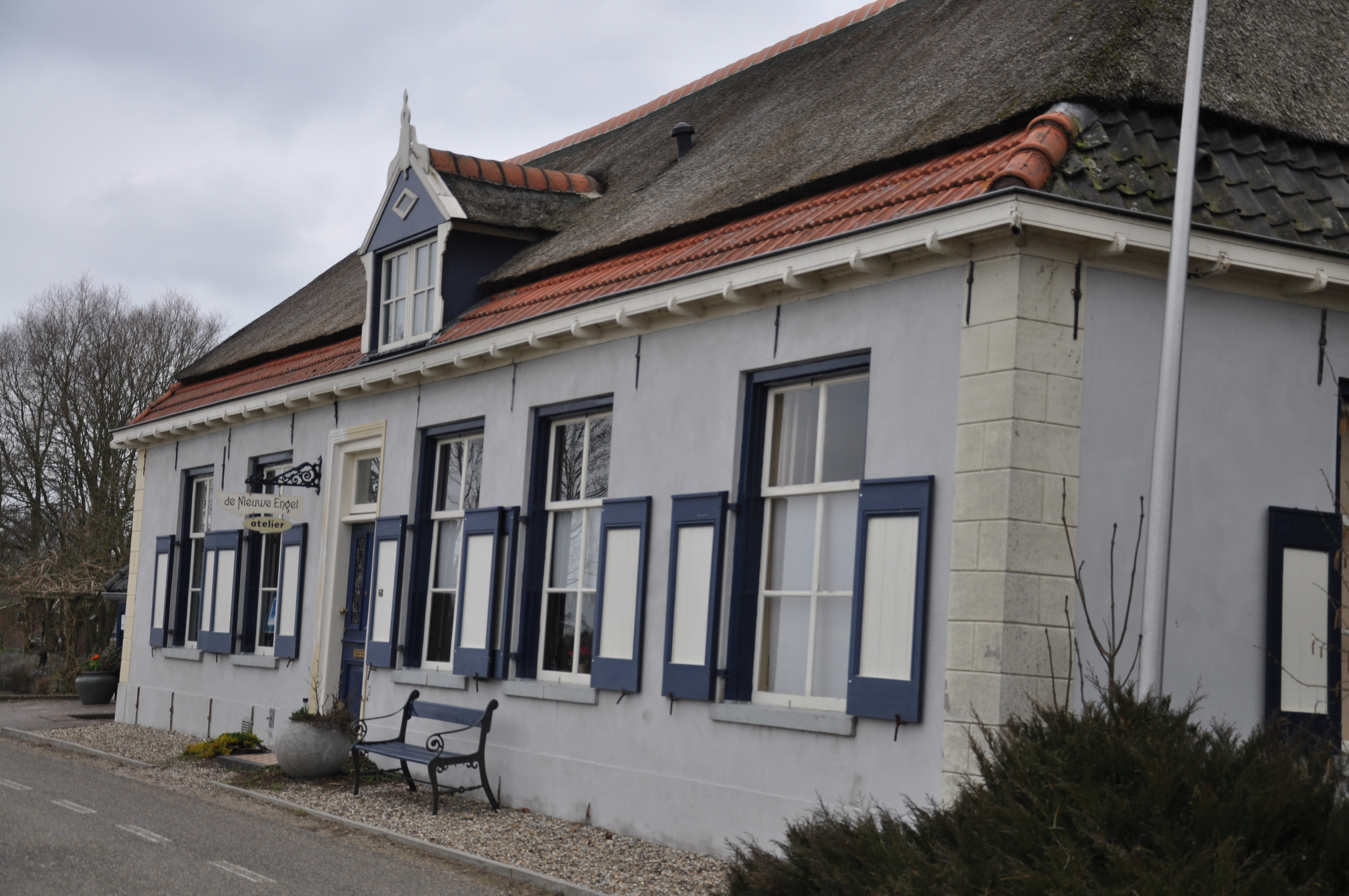
Farm in Welsum

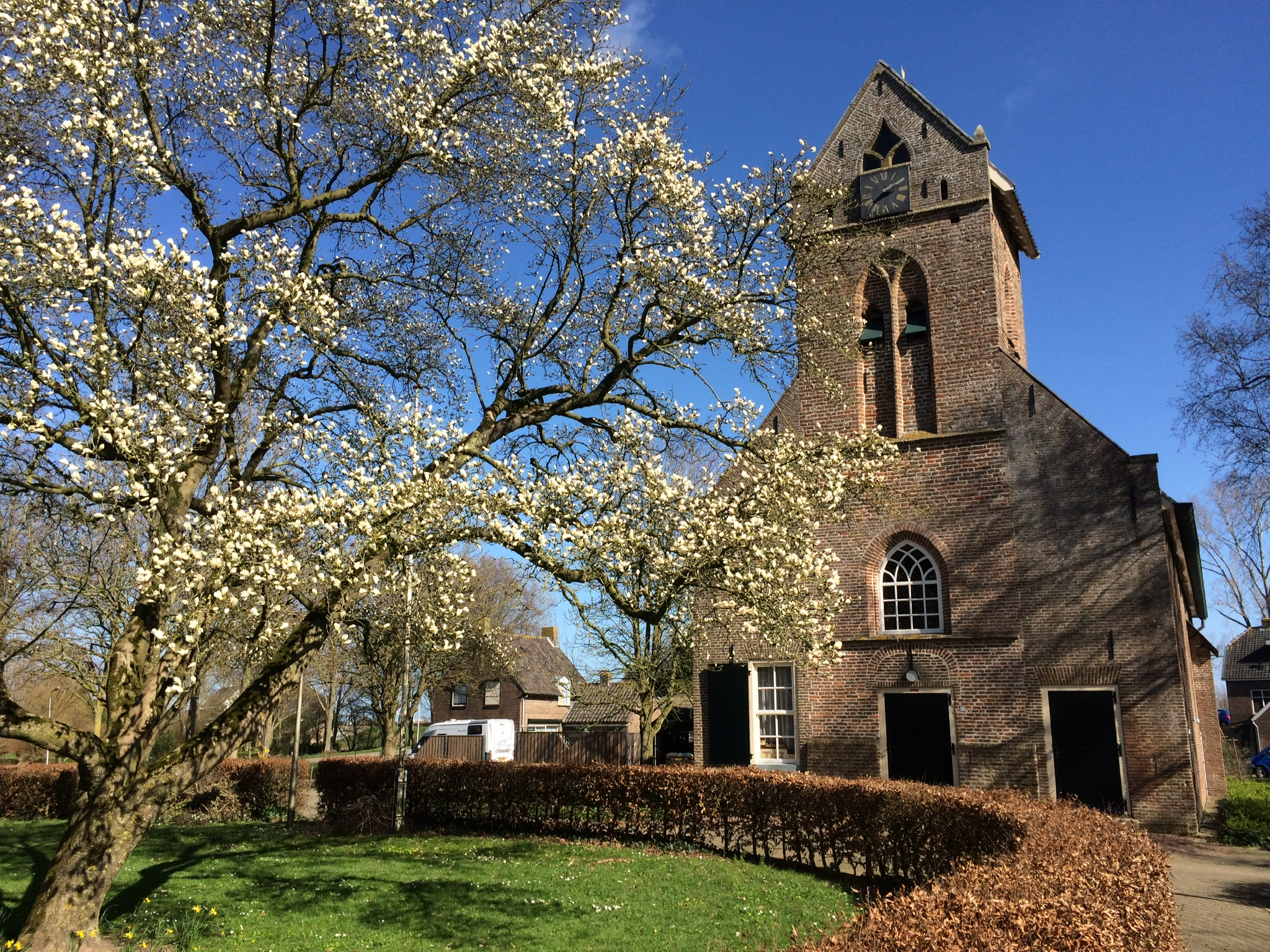
Church of Welsum

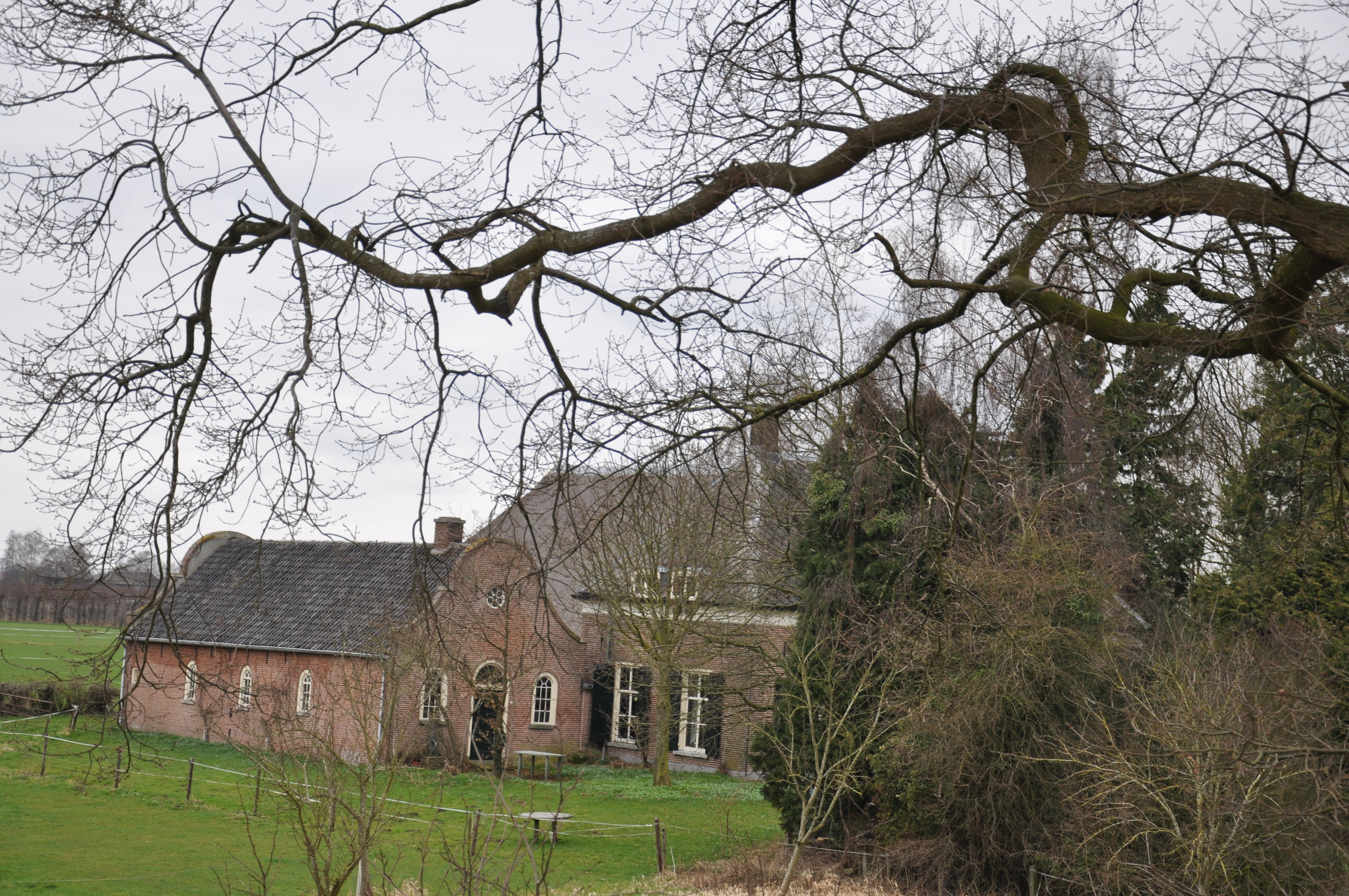
Farm in Welsum

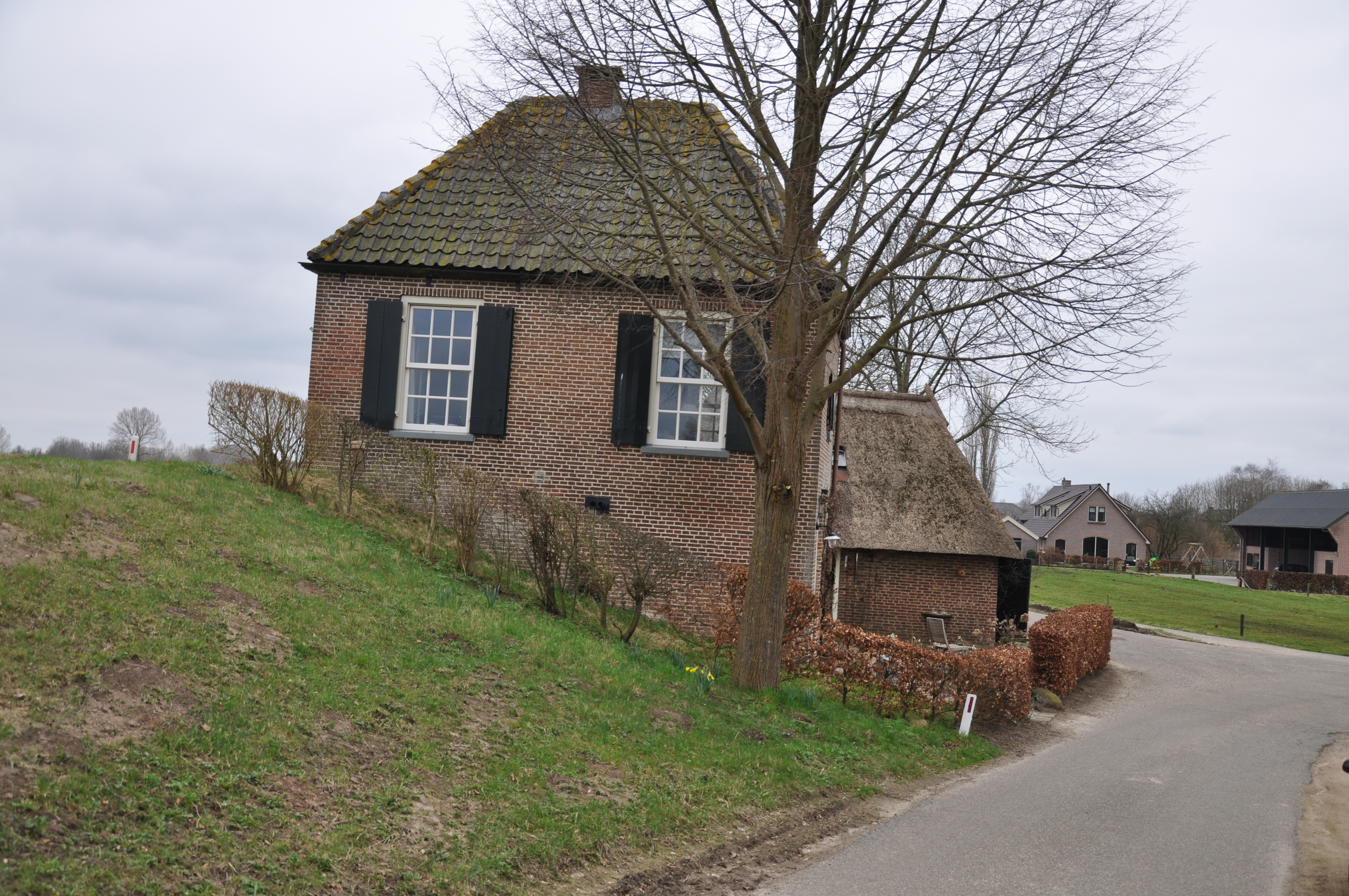
Former toll house on the dike
