= Bercu =

Bercu may refer to several villages in Romania:

- Bercu, a village in Bretea Română Commune, Hunedoara County
- Bercu, a village in Lazuri Commune, Satu Mare County
- Bercu Nou, a village in Micula Commune, Satu Mare County

and to:

- Michaela Bercu, Romanian-Israeli model

also:

- Bercu, a hamlet in the Mouchin commune in the Nord department, northern France
