= Berghof, Lucerne =

Former municipality, canton of Lucerne

Berghof
- Former municipality
- Country: Switzerland
- Canton: Lucerne
- District: {{{district}}}
- Municipality: Hildisrieden, Rain and Römerswil
- Time zone: UTC+01:00 (CET)
  - Summer (DST): UTC+02:00 (CEST)
- Website

Berghof is a former municipality in the canton of Lucerne, Switzerland. The group of hamlets and scattered farms, also called Hof or Höfe am Berg, lies between Lake Sempach and Lake Baldegg on the range of hills north of Rothenburg. Originally a cooperative (Genossenschaft), Berghof became a tax district (Steuerbrief) after 1780 and later a municipality. In 1836 it was dissolved and divided among the municipalities of Hildisrieden, Rain and Römerswil.

== History ==
Berghof was first assigned to the Habsburg offices (Ämter) of Sempach and Richensee. In the 14th century, with Ludiswil as its manorial court (Dinghof) and Tempikon as its place of court, it came under the advocacy (Vogtei) of Rothenburg, and with it passed to Lucerne in 1395/1415. It remained part of the bailiwick (Landvogtei) of Rothenburg until 1798. In the Middle Ages numerous religious institutions owned land there. The most important church center was the parish church of Römerswil; in Hildisrieden there was a chapel with a curate's chaplaincy (Kuratkaplanei, 1516).

In the late Middle Ages arable farming was carried out under the open-field system (Zelgensystem); from the 16th century, enclosures (Einschläge) led to the end of the compulsory field system (Flurzwang). In 1799 the farms were divided into municipalities (Munizipalitäten) with limited autonomy, which afterwards formed the municipal court (Gemeindegericht) of Hildisrieden together with Neudorf. From 1808 to 1819 Ludigen belonged to the municipality of Münster (now Beromünster) as an exclave. By a decision of the government of 2 December 1836, Berghof was divided among the municipalities of Hildisrieden, Rain and Römerswil.

== Bibliography ==
- F. Glauser, J. J. Siegrist, Die Luzerner Pfarreien und Landvogteien, 1977
- G. P. Marchal, Sempach 1386, 1986
- A. Ineichen, Innovative Bauern, 1996
