= Alexandra Berková =

Czech writer and educator (1949–2008)

Alexandra Berková

Alexandra Berková (2 July 1949 – 16 June 2008) was a Czech writer and educator.

The daughter of an orchestra conductor and a journalist, she was born in Trenčín and studied Czech literature and applied arts at Charles University in Prague. From 1973 to 1981, she worked as an editor for a publishing house and, after 1905, as a high school teacher in creative arts. From 1983 to 1991, Berková wrote for Czechoslovak Television. After the 1989 Revolution, she helped organize the Writers' Council and helped found the feminist group New Humanity.

She married the painter Vladimír Novák and they had two children but later separated.

Her work appears in English translation in the following collections:

- Description of a Struggle: The Picador Book of Contemporary East European Prose (1994)
- Daylight in Nightclub Inferno: Czech Fiction from the Post-Kundera Generation (1997)
- Allskin and Other Tales by Contemporary Czech Women (1998)
- Povidky: Short Stories by Czech Women (2006)

== Selected works ==
- Knížka s červeným obalem [The Little Book with the Red Cover], short stories (1986)
- Magorie aneb Příběh velké lásky [Magoria or A Tale of Great Love], novel (1991)
- Utrpení oddaného všiváka [Sorrows of a Devoted Scoundrel], novel (1993)
- Temná láska [Dark Love] (2000)
- Banální příběh [Banal Story] (2004)
