= Berka (surname) =

Berka (feminine: Berková) is a Czech surname. It could have originated in several ways. In Old Czech, the word berka meant 'robber' and could indicate the bearer's way of life. The surname could also be derived from the given names Bernard, the now non-existent Czech names Berislav and Berivoj, and possibly even from Bartoloměj (Czech form of Bartholomew). In some Czech dialects, the word berka meant 'sucking lice'. The oldest mention of the surname is from 1477. Notable people with the surname include:

- Berka of Dubá, Czech noble family
  - Hynek Berka of Dubá (c. 1297 – 1348), knight
  - Zbyněk Berka of Dubá (1551–1606), cardinal
- Alexandra Berková (1949–2008), Czech writer and educator
- Dagmar Berková (1922–2002), Czech graphic designer, illustrator and painter
- Eva Berková (born 1965), Slovak basketball player
- Renata Berková (born 1975), Czech triathlete
- Zdislava Berka, originally Zdislava z Lemberka (c. 1220 – 1252), philanthropist and saint
- Amplonius Rating de Berka (c. 1365 – 1435), German medical doctor, educator and book collector
