= Olst =

- Town
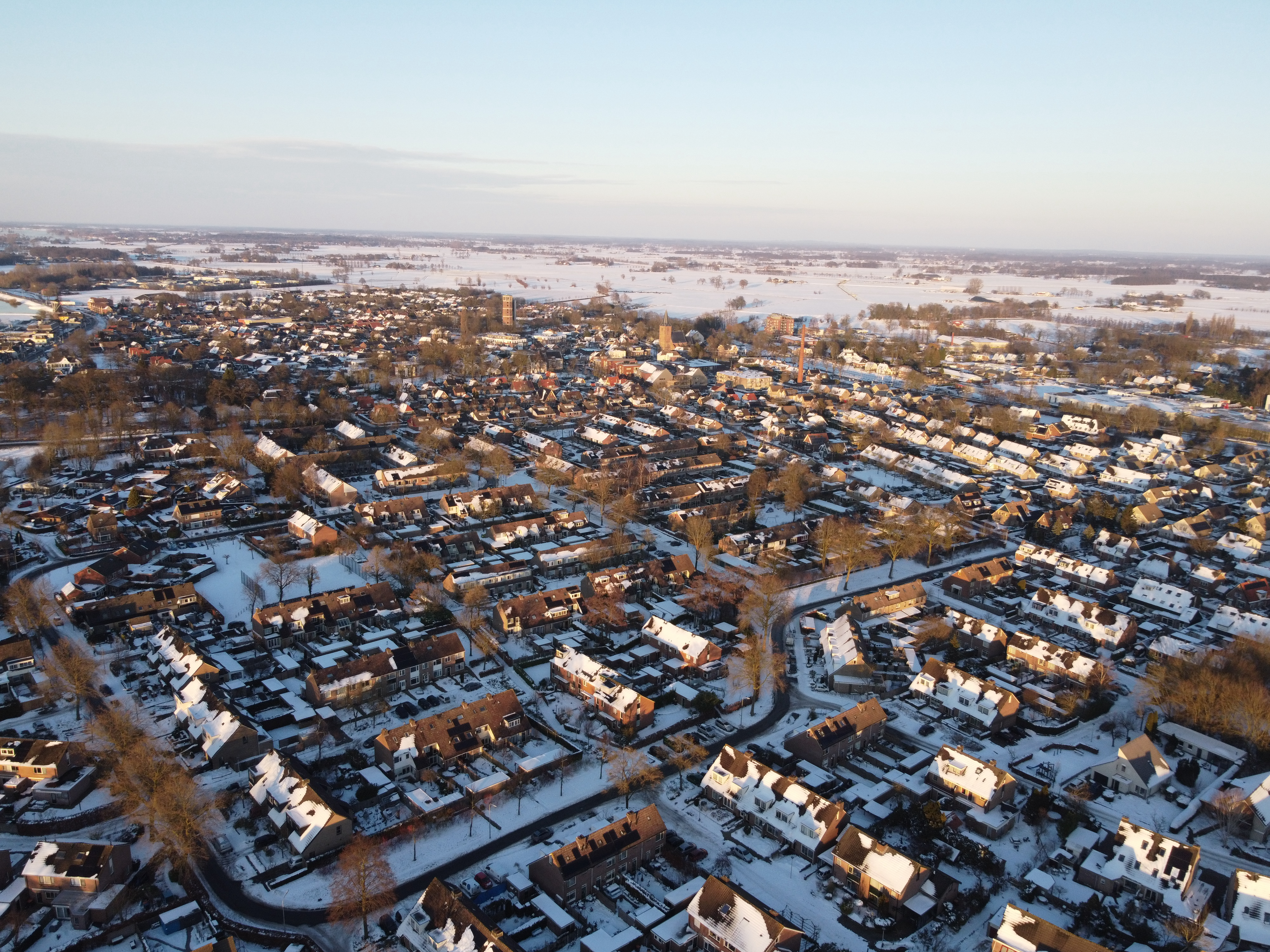
- Aerial view of Olst

- Flag Coat of arms

- Location in the province of Overijssel in the Netherlands Olst (Netherlands)
- Coordinates: 52°20′16″N 6°6′39″E
- Country: Netherlands
- Province: Overijssel
- Municipality: Olst-Wijhe

Olst is a town in the Dutch province of Overijssel, about 8 km (5 mi) north of Deventer. It is located in the municipality of Olst-Wijhe.

== History ==
The village was first mentioned in 947 Holsto. The etymology is unknown. Olst is an esdorp which developed along the IJssel river. In 1308, the dike along the river was built, and Olst became a stopover for the ships from Zwolle to Deventer.

The lower part of the tower of the Dutch Reformed church dates from around 1200. The tower was enlarged in 1336. The church was extensively modified between 1493 and 1494.

In the 15th century, the havezate (manor house) Averbergen was constructed on two yards from the former monastery Essen. The area is similar to the 947 reference, therefore, there might have been earlier predecessors. The manor house was owned by a branch of the van Voorst tot Voorst family. In 1814 it was sold, and later demolished. In 1966, a retirement home was built in its place.

Olst was home to 823 people in 1840. In 1866, a railway station was opened on the Arnhem–Leeuwarden railway. The railway line stimulated the industrialisation of Olst.

The grist mill Bökkers Mölle was built in 1895, however the lower part dates from 1729. The wind mill was in use until 1961, when an electro motor was installed. In 1990, it was sold to Solvay S.A. who operated a factory next to the wind mill. In 1993, it was sold on to a foundation who restored the wind mill in 1996, and it was recommissioned to grind professionally.

Until 2002, Olst was the seat of the municipality of the same name. The municipality was merged with that of Wijhe in 2001, keeping the name of the largest constituent part (Olst), until it was renamed Olst-Wijhe a year later.

== Transportation ==
- Railway station: Olst

== Gallery ==
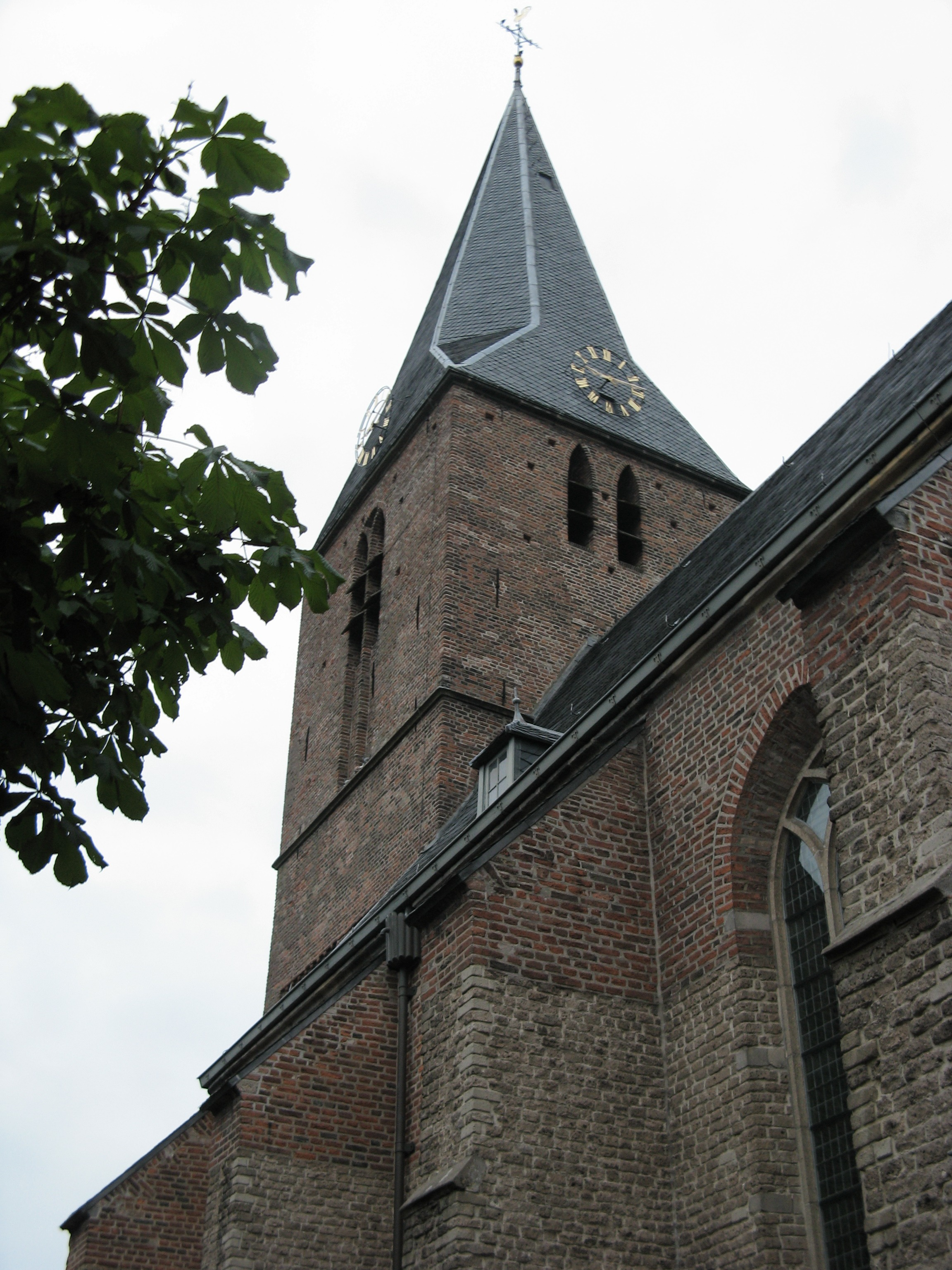
Protestant Church

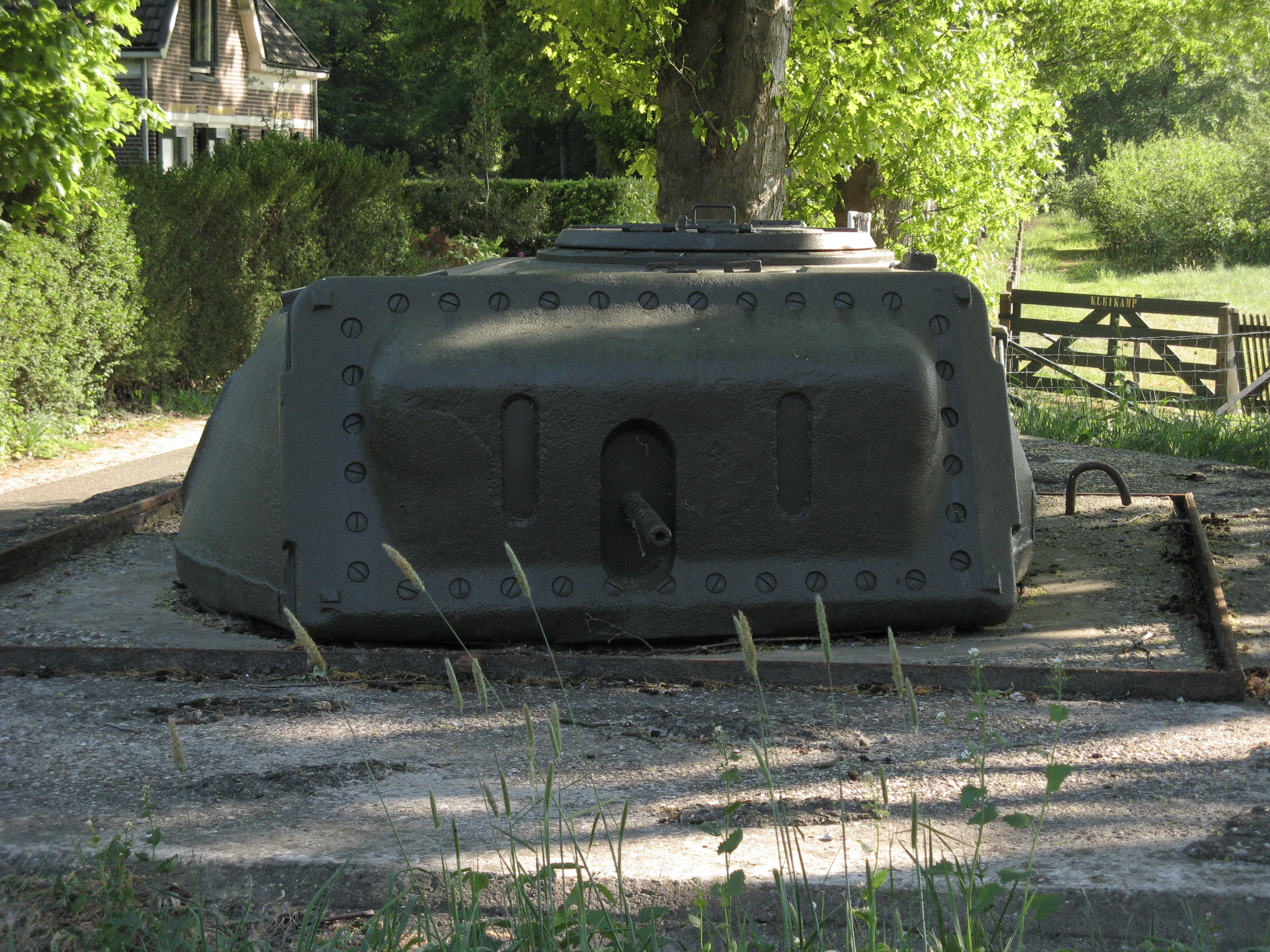
IJssellinie near Olst

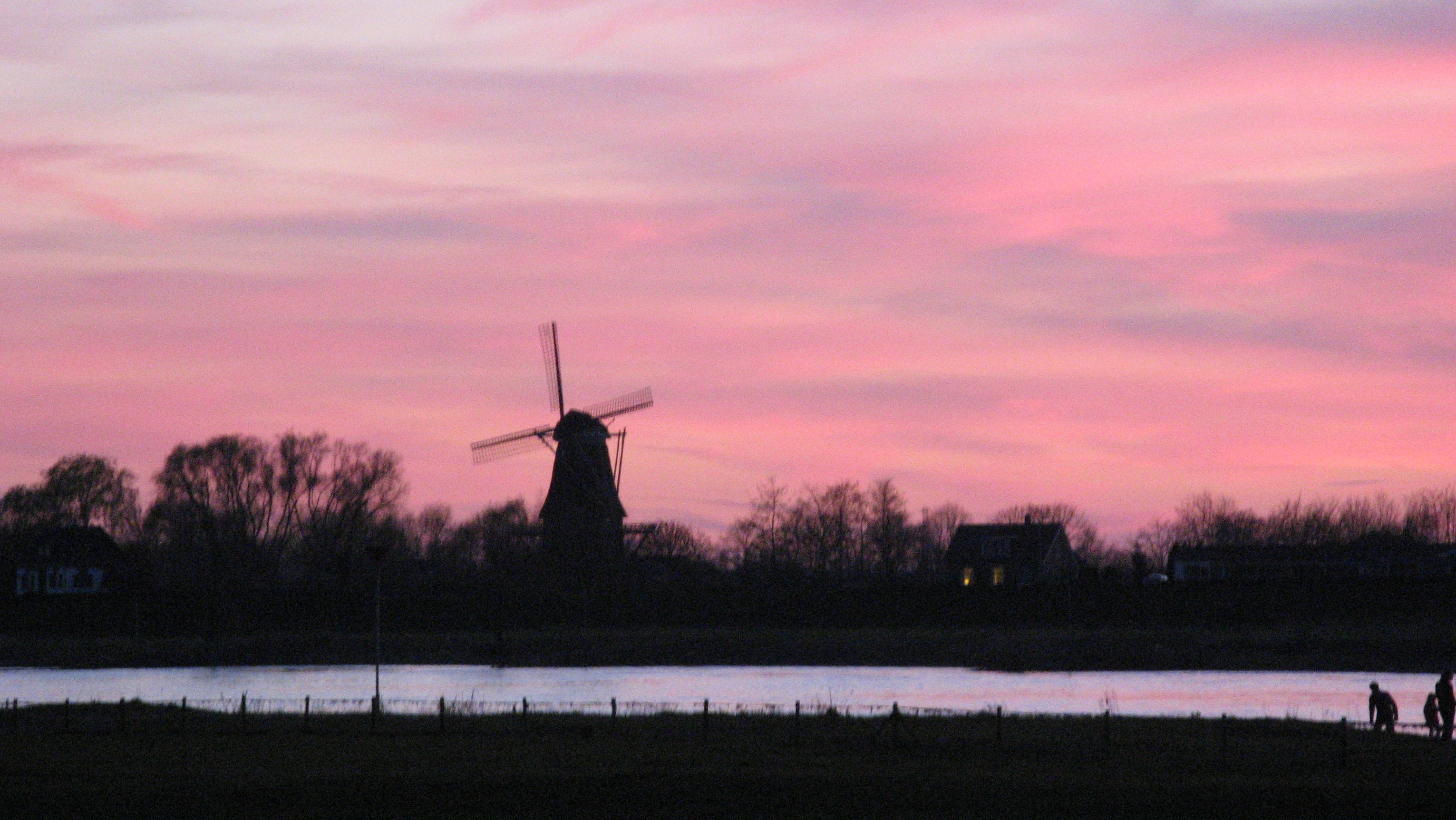
River IJssel near Olst

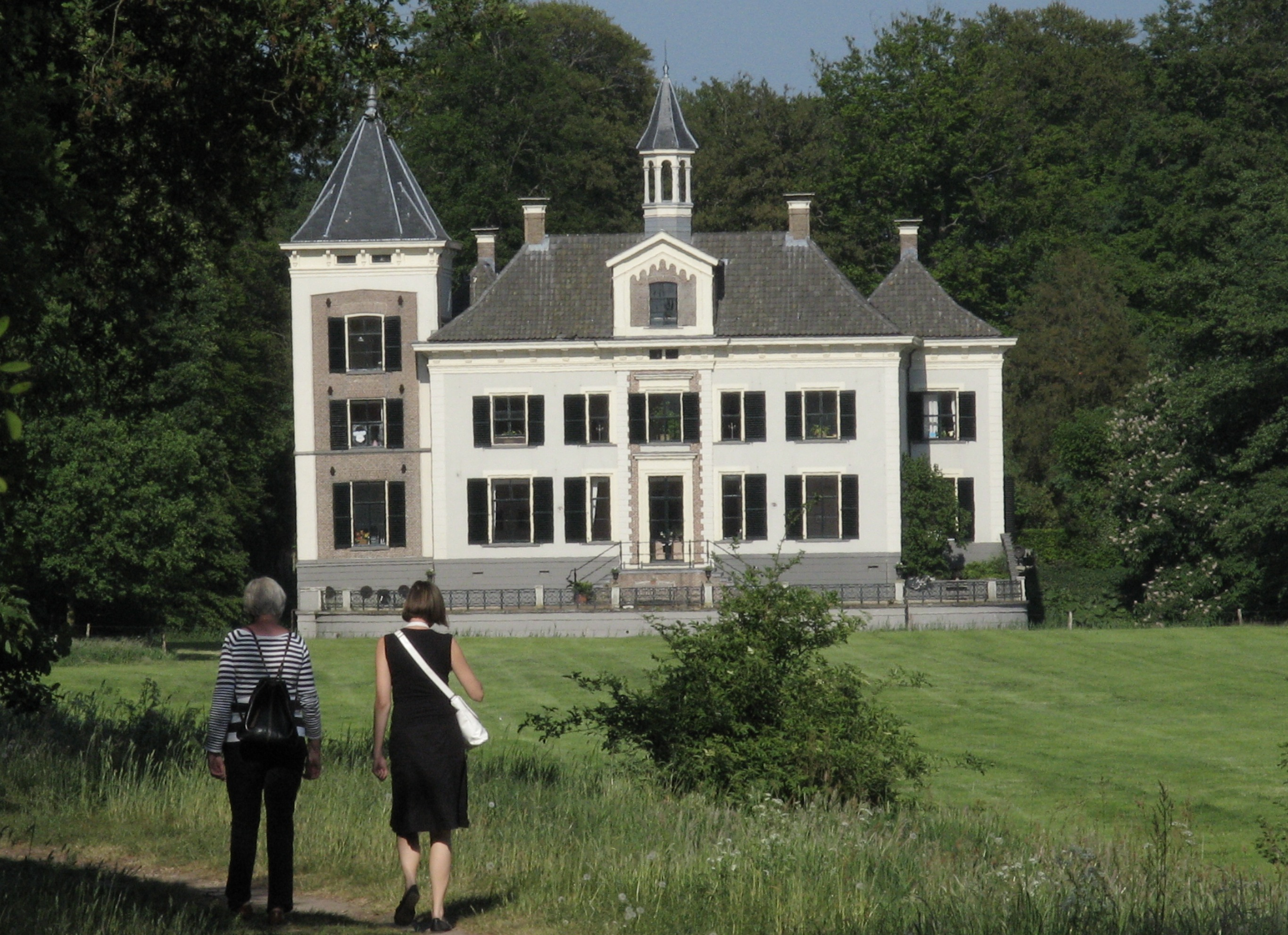
de Haere near Olst

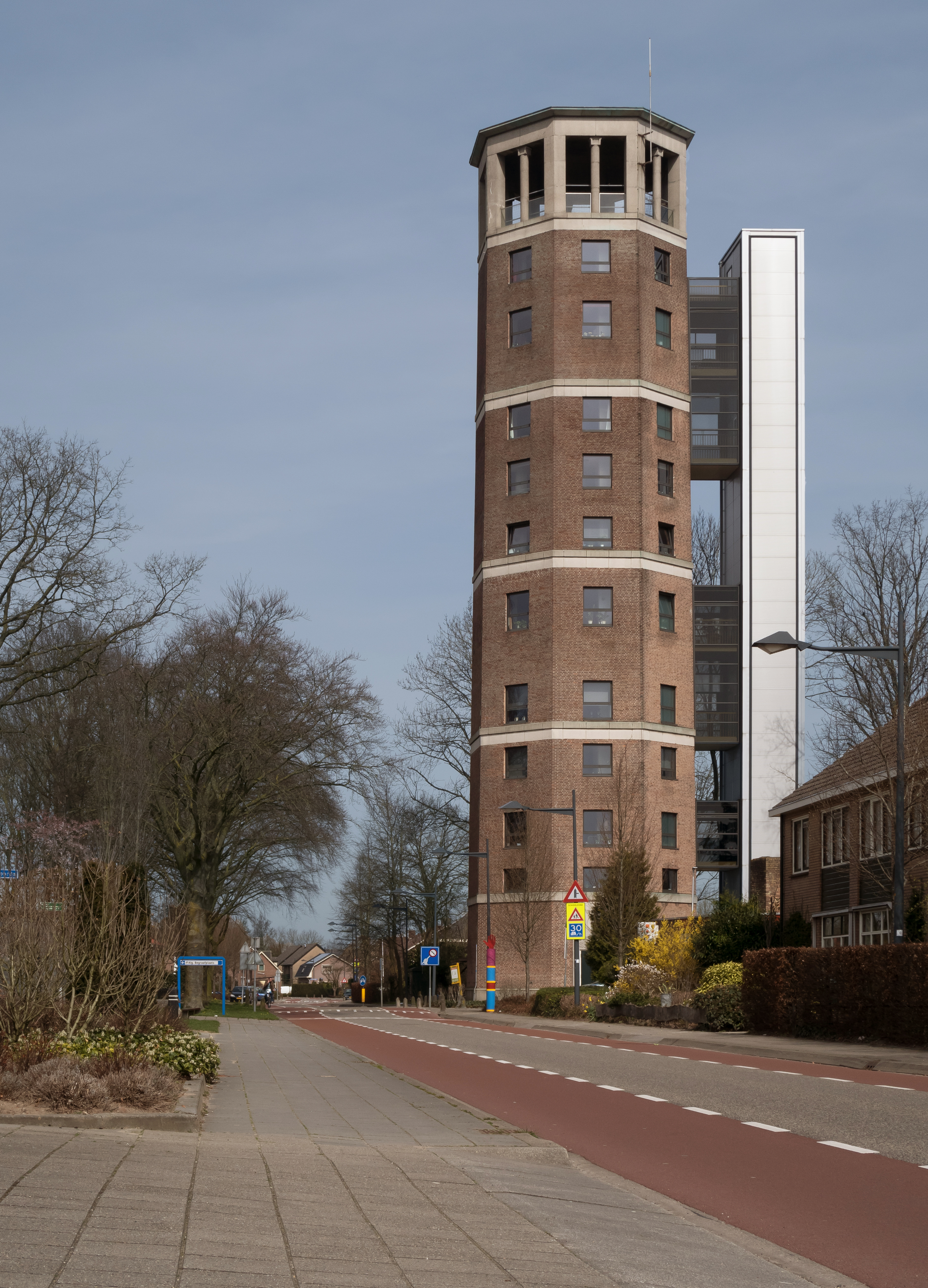
Watertower in Olst
