= Boskamp, Overijssel =

Boskamp
- Village
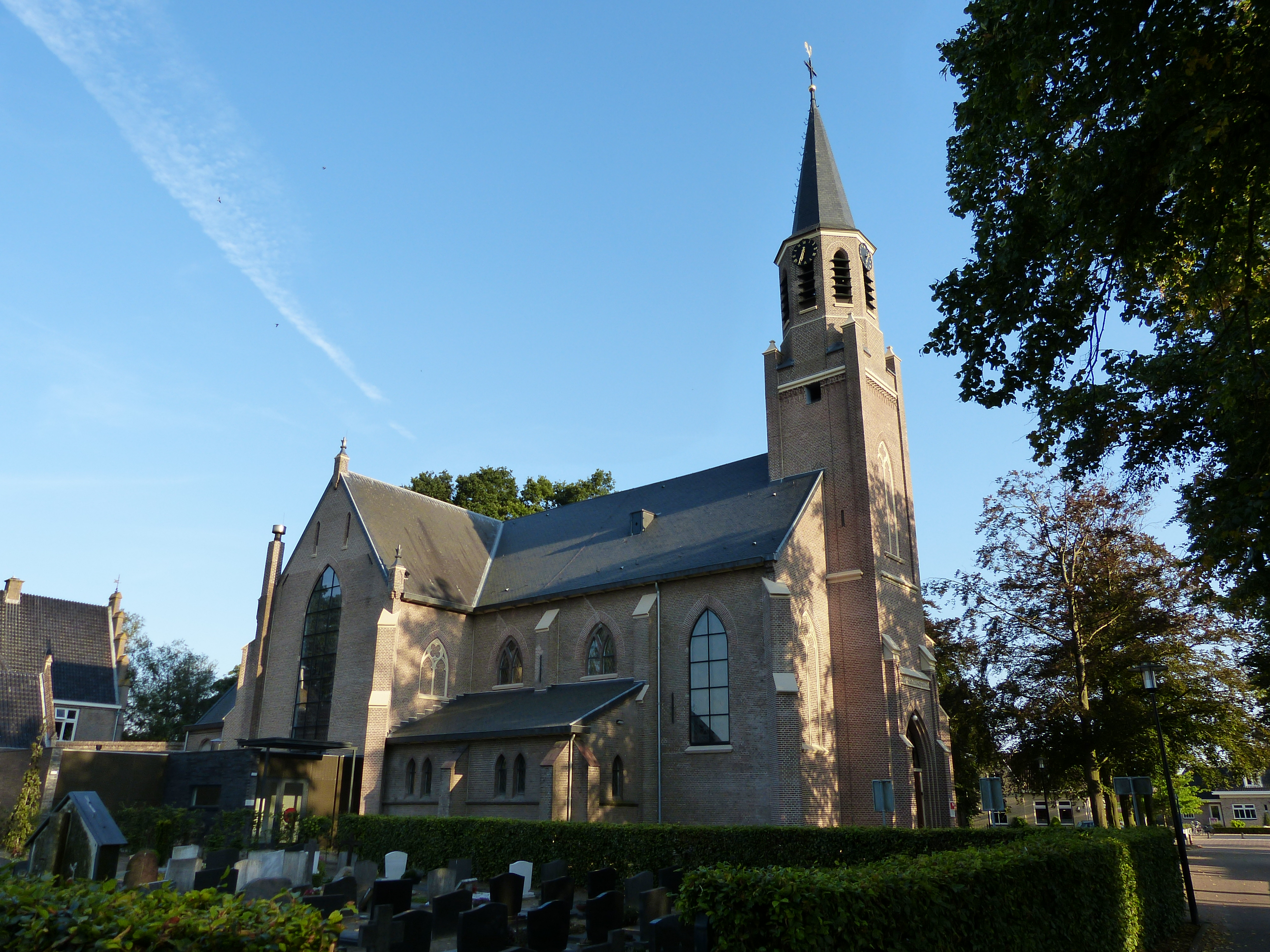
- Church at Boskamp Willibrordus

- Location in the Netherlands Boskamp (Netherlands)
- Coordinates: 52°19′51″N 6°7′44″E
- Country: Netherlands
- Province: Overijssel
- Municipality: Olst-Wijhe

Area
  - Total: 4.80 km^{2} (1.85 sq mi)
- Elevation: 6 m (20 ft)

Population (2021)
  - Total: 1,180
  - Density: 246/km^{2} (637/sq mi)
- Time zone: UTC+1 (CET)
  - Summer (DST): UTC+2 (CEST)
- Postal code: 8121
- Dialing code: 0570

Boskamp is a village in the Dutch province of Overijssel. It is east of Olst in the municipality of Olst-Wijhe.

== History ==
It was first mentioned in 1665 as Boscamp, and means "(noble) camp in the forest". A settlement has been known to exist since 1455. Around 1500, the havezate Boskamp was built which was demolished in 1859, and replaced by the Willibrordus church. Groot Hoenlo is a havezate located to the south of Boskamp. It was built in 1368 by Wolter Machoris. The current building is from the 18th century, and received its current layout in 1897. The postal authorities have placed Boskamp under Olst. In 1929, the monastery Saint Willibrord was built. It is currently used a retirement home.

== Gallery ==
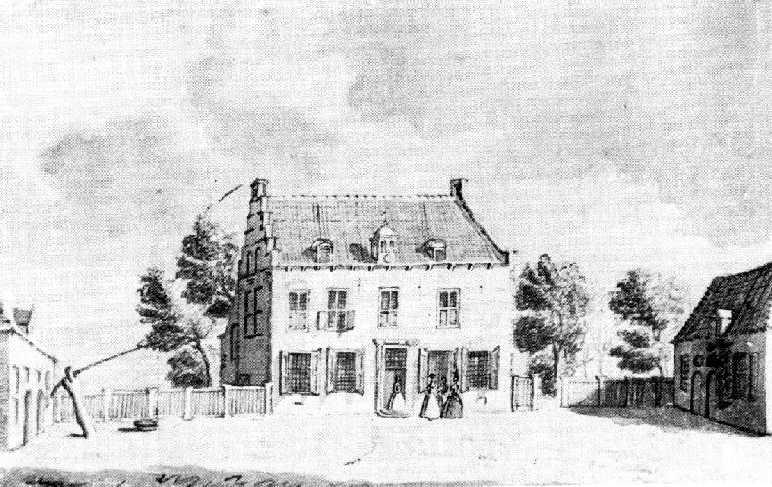
Havezate Boskamp (18th century)

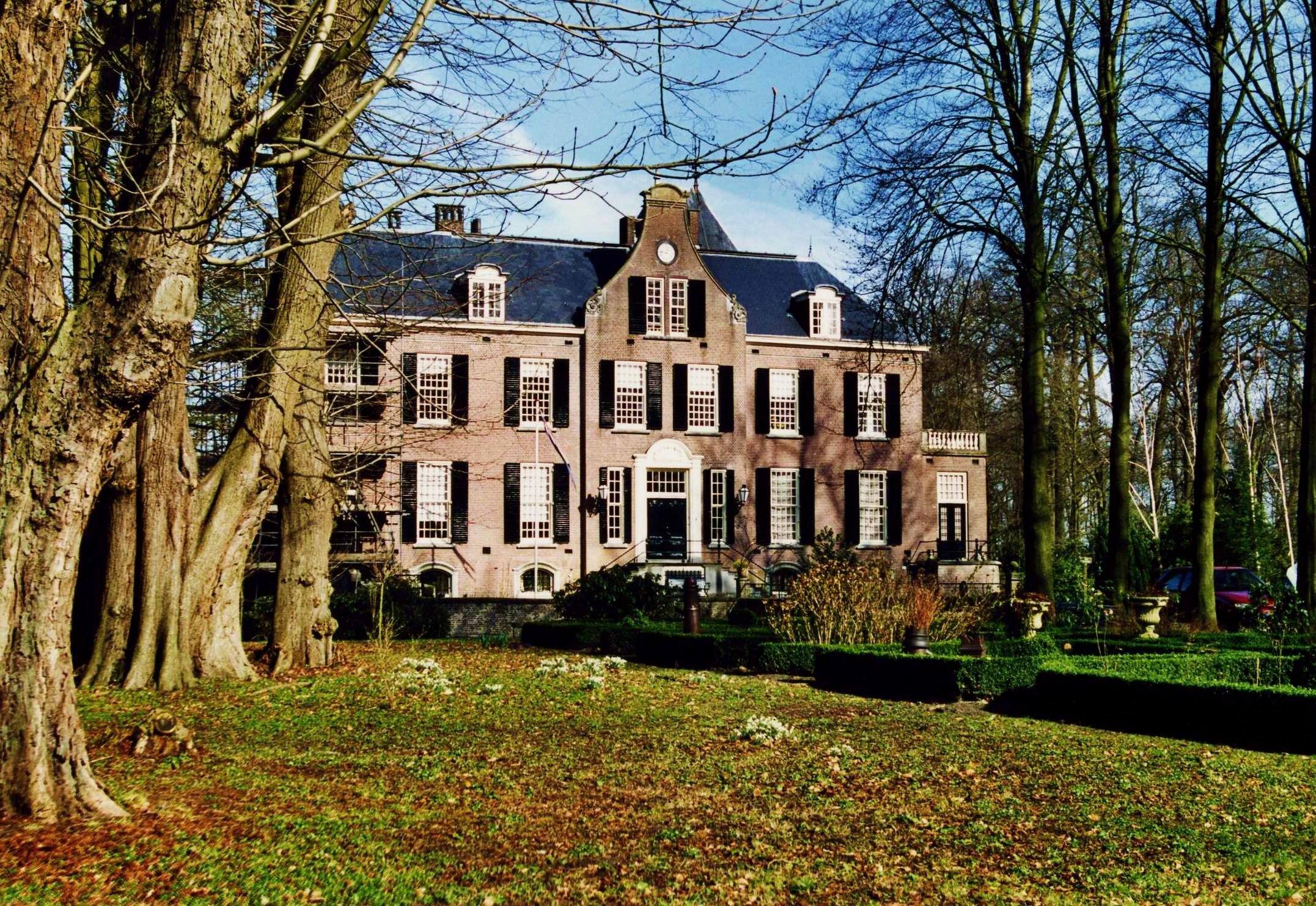
Groot Hoenlo

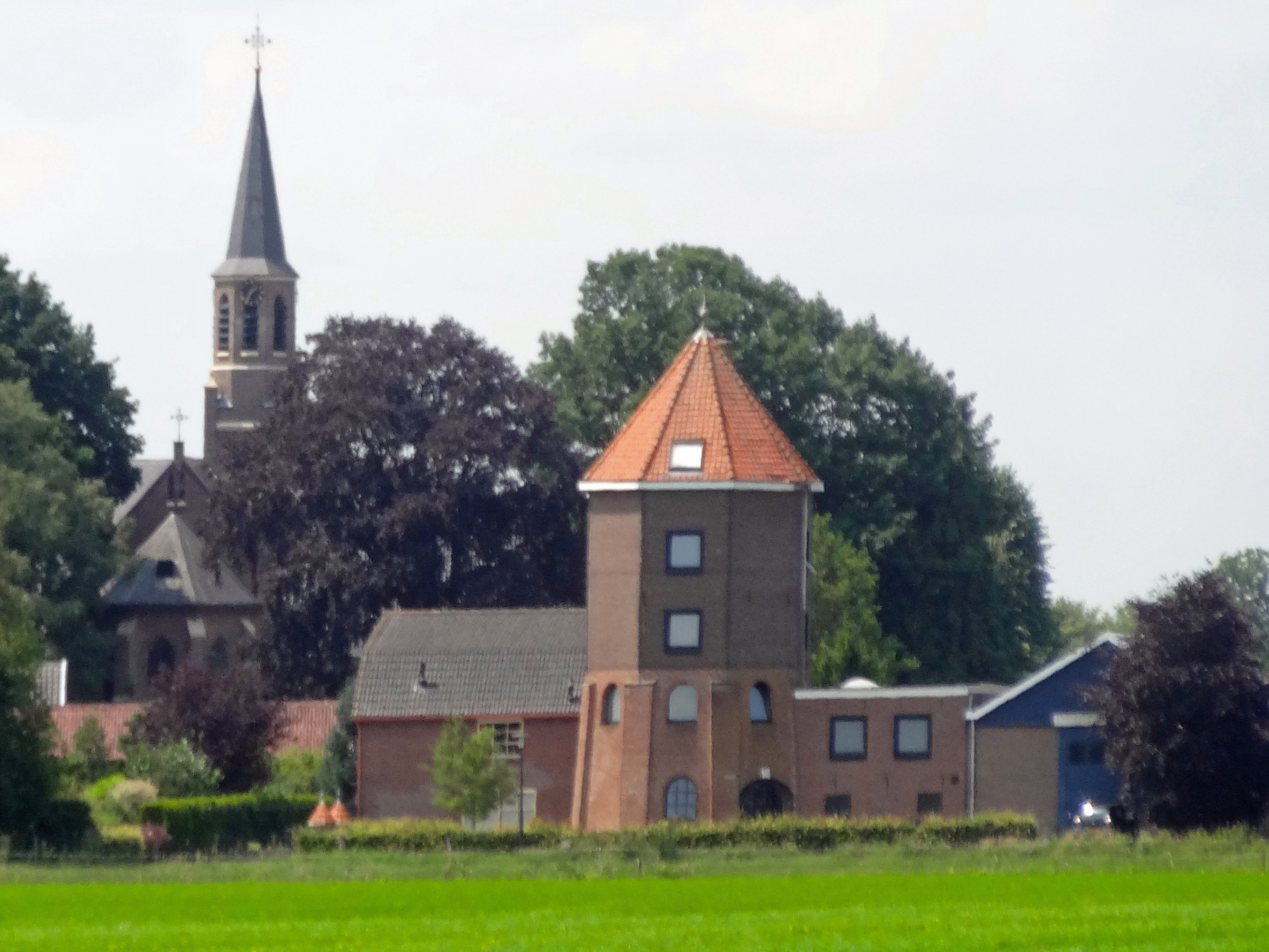
Former windmill with a view on Boskamp

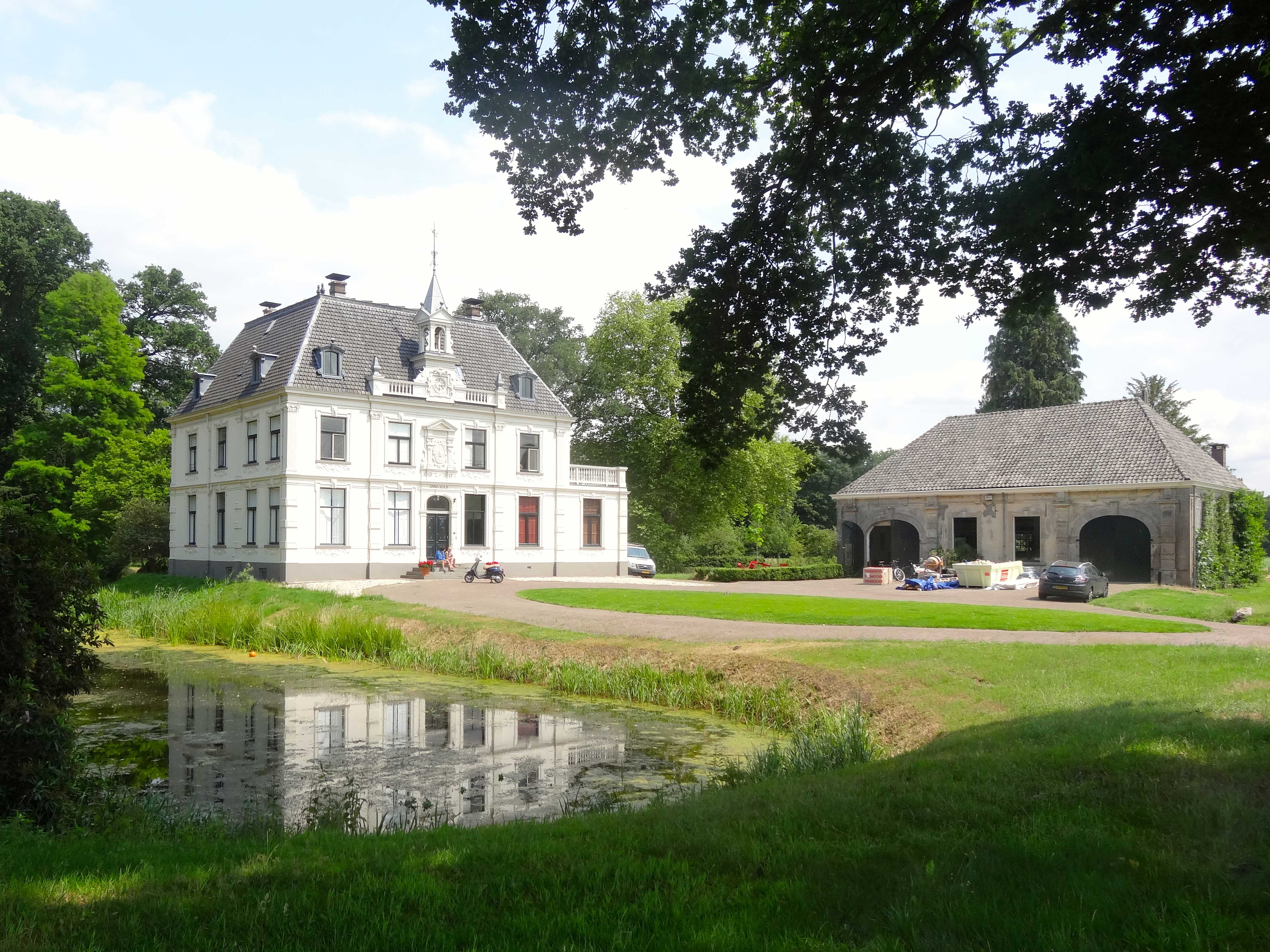
Huis Spijkerbosch
