= Gerrit Berkhoff =

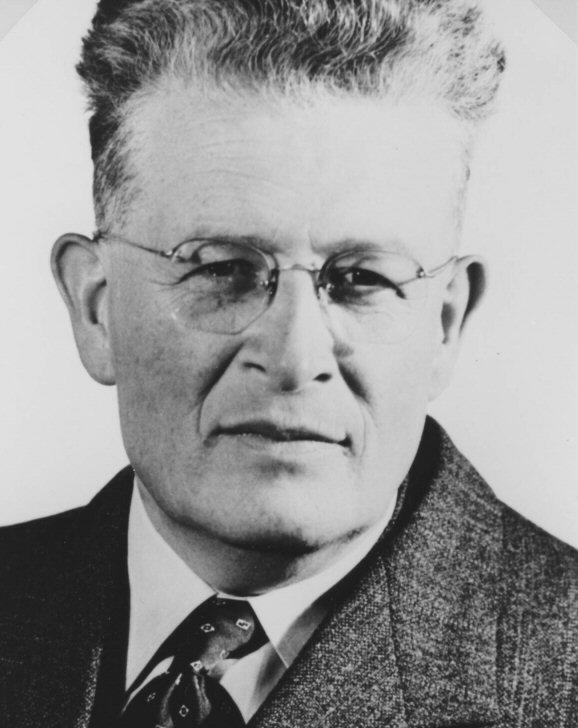
Dr. Gerrit Berkhoff

Gerrit (Gé) Berkhoff (Wijhe 9 July 1901 – Oosterbeek 27 February 1996) was a Dutch chemist and the first rector magnificus of the University of Twente in The Netherlands.

== Education ==
The son of primary school principal Gerrit Berkhoff (1868–1959) and Martha Severs (1872–1949), Berkhoff studied chemistry at Leiden University where he obtained, in 1929, a doctor's degree with his PhD dissertation "Osmose van ternaire vloeistoffen" ("Osmosis of ternary fluids"). As a student, he worked for four years as a laboratory assistant for inorganic chemistry.

== DSM ==
In 1929, Berkhoff started his career as a research chemist at DSM (Dutch State Mines). During the 1930s, he supervised the development of fertilizers for the Nitrogen Fixation Plant (Stikstofbindings Bedrijf (SBB)). His publications on the crystallisation of ammonium nitrate date from this period. His visionary and social talents led to a change from incremental research (responding to the competition) to innovative research (taking the initiative). This resulted in 1940 in the foundation of the Central Laboratory (Centraal Laboratorium (CL)), of which he became director. His journeys to the US immediately after the Second World War, to look at diversification options, enabled DSM to start the production of caprolactam, the raw material needed for the enkalon or nylon 6 textile fibre of the AKU, now part of AkzoNobel. Until his departure in 1961, he was CEO of all DSM's research and development divisions, which under his supervision became highly successful.

== University of Twente ==
In 1961, Berkhoff was entrusted by the minister for education to start preparations for the third technological university college in The Netherlands in Twente, now the University of Twente. Two years later, he was appointed as the first rector magnificus. Under his supervision, the university became innovative in various areas, including student campus-accommodation (previously unknown in The Netherlands), the integration of engineering and the social sciences (now called: high tech, human touch) and the launching of a bachelor's degree. The purpose of the bachelor's degree was to encourage Dutch industry to employ young bachelor graduates instead of older master graduates. The concept was not viable. His speech held on the occasion of the festive opening in 1964 by Queen Juliana and Prince Bernard ended by using the words William of Orange spoke in 1574 on the occasion of the opening of the first Dutch University in Leiden: "That this University College may grow into a lasting fundament and support of freedom, is our sincerest wish". In 1967, he left the University. In his honour the Berkhoff Chair was installed in 1999 and in 2010 the Berkhoff Hall was opened for academic ceremonies.

== Royal honours ==
- Officer in the Order of Orange-Nassau (1957)
- Knight in the Order of the Netherlands Lion (1967)
