= Berko (surname) =

Berko is a surname. Notable people with the surname include:

- Jean Berko Gleason (born 1931), American psycholinguist
- Mikki Osei Berko (born 1973), Ghanaian actor
