= Wijhe =

- Town
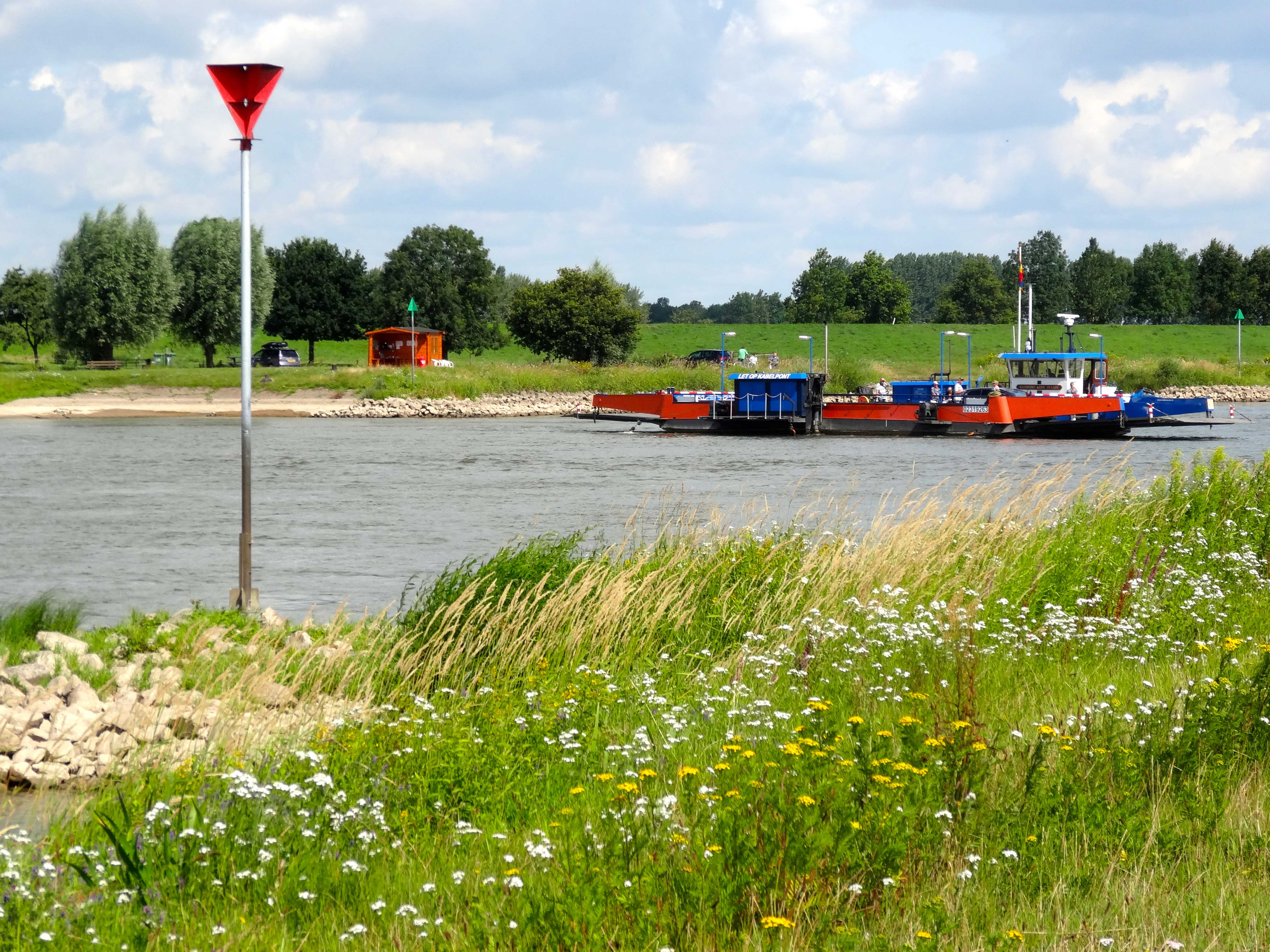
- An image of Wijhe

- Flag Coat of arms

- Location in the province of Overijssel in the Netherlands Wijhe (Netherlands)
- Coordinates: 52°23′11″N 6°8′0″E
- Country: Netherlands
- Province: Overijssel
- Municipality: Olst-Wijhe

Area
  - Total: 6.43 km^{2} (2.48 sq mi)
- Elevation: 3 m (9.8 ft)

Population (2021)
  - Total: 6,210
  - Density: 966/km^{2} (2,500/sq mi)
- Time zone: UTC+1 (CET)
  - Summer (DST): UTC+2 (CEST)
- Postal code: 8131
- Dialing code: 0570

Wijhe (Dutch pronunciation: [ˈʋɛiə]) is a village in the Dutch province of Overijssel. It is located in the municipality of Olst-Wijhe and is situated about 12 km south of Zwolle on the banks of the river IJssel.

Wijhe was a separate municipality until 2001, when it merged with Olst.

== History & Sights ==
The first written record of Wijhe dates from the year 960 as "Wie." The village has a church built in the late-Gothic style, parts of which date from the 13th and 14th century. The windmill in the centre is still in working order. It was built in 1703 and is the oldest eight square mill in the province. To the north of Wijhe lies the hamlet of Herxen with a riverside nature reserve.

Wijhe has three estates: Hengevoorde containing a manor house, Het Nijenhuis with a castle and De Gelder. The last one is the private property of Baron De Vos van Steenwijk, but it is free for public access. Most of the De Gelder castle was destroyed during World War II.

== Transportation ==
- Railway station: Wijhe

== Gallery ==
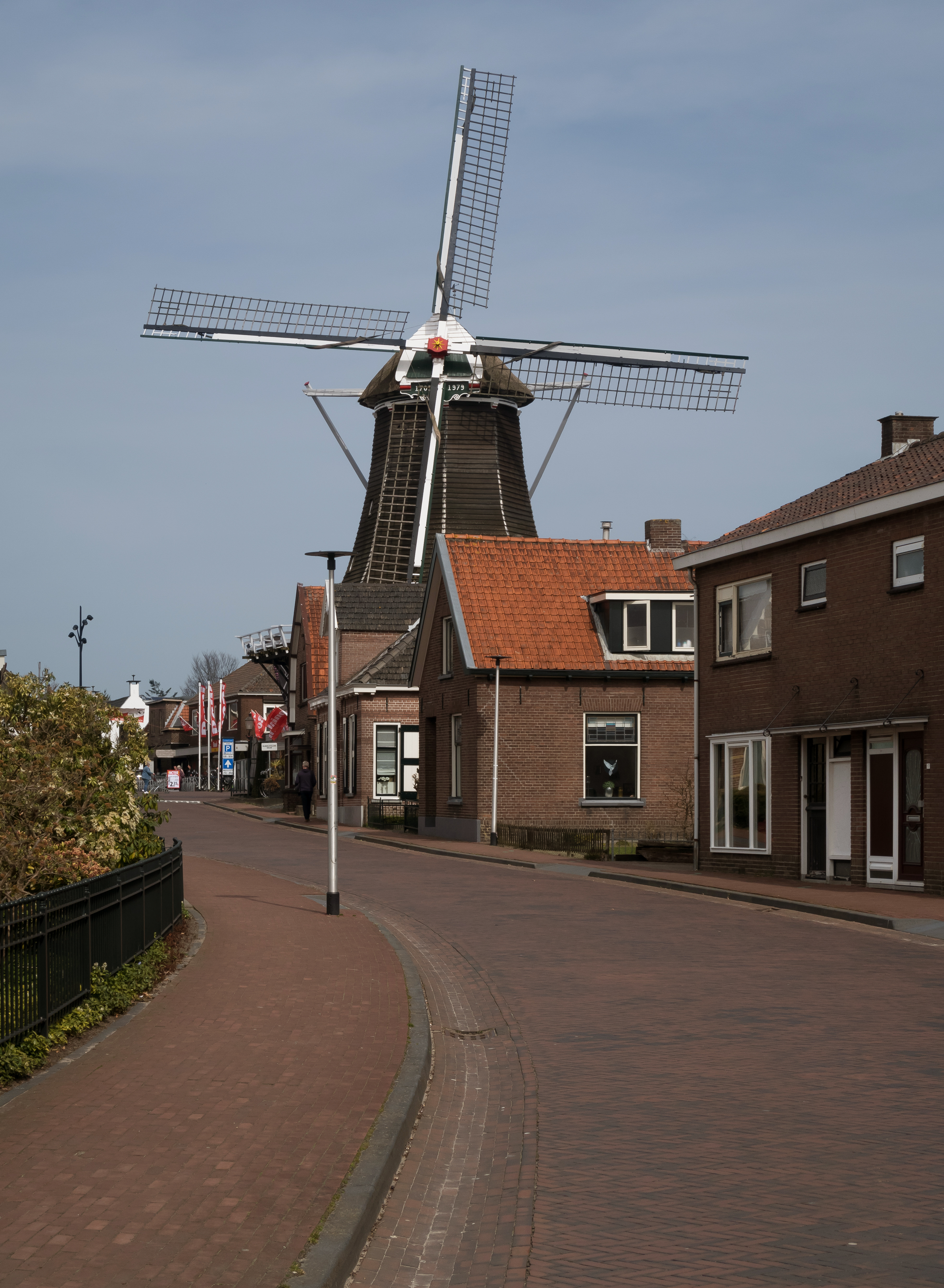
Windmill: the Wijhese Molen

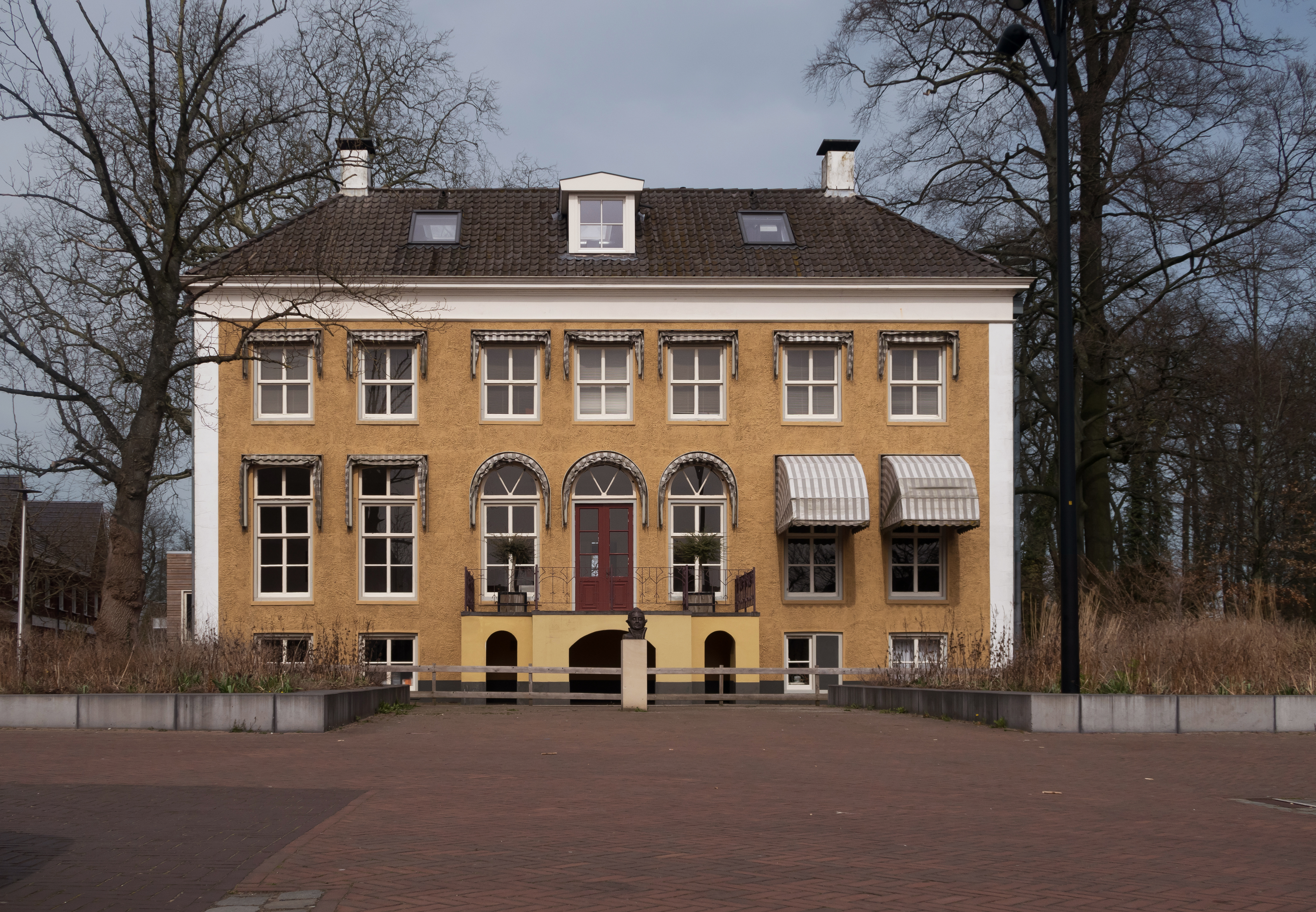
Villa at the Van Dedemplein
