= Berkhoff (surname) =

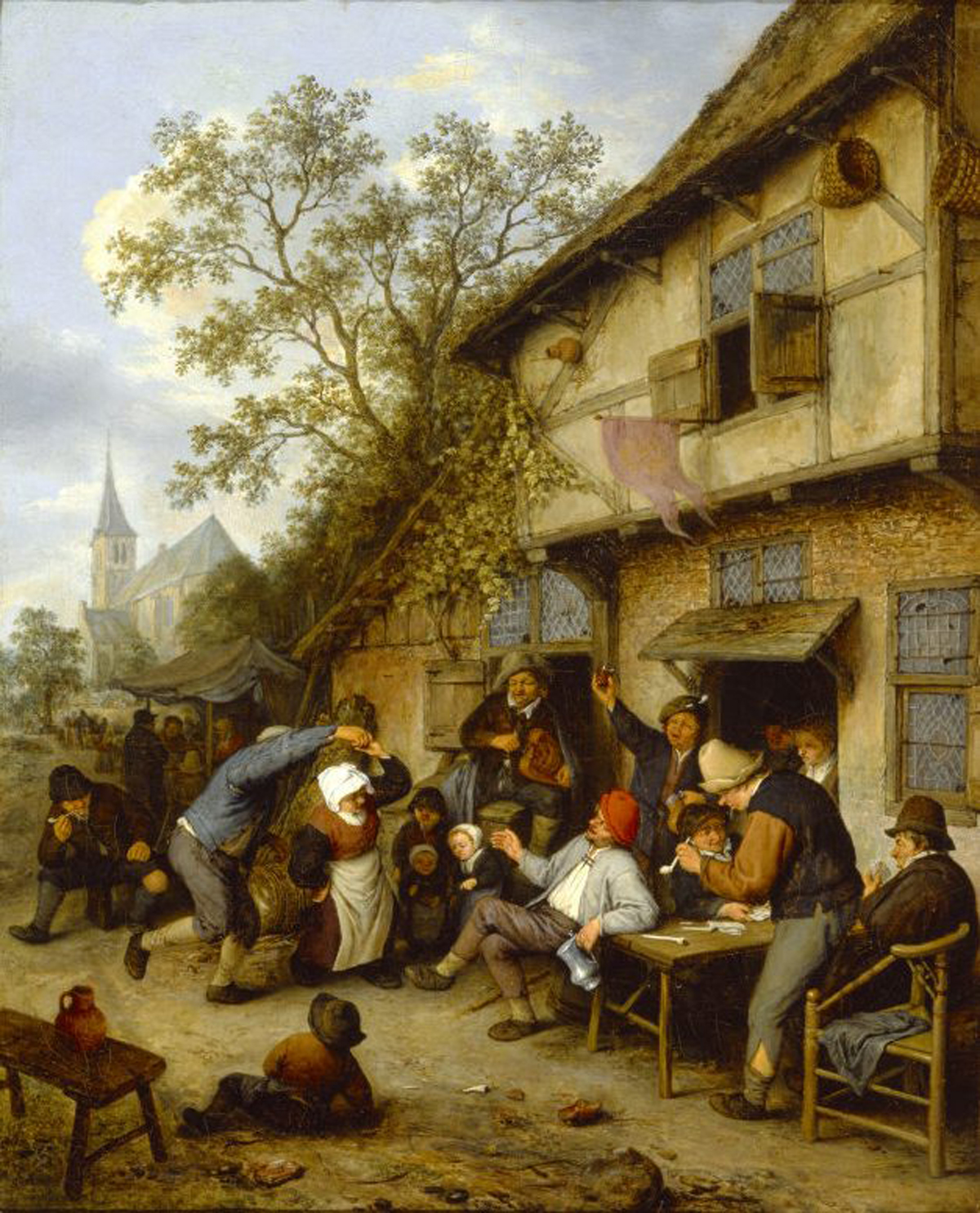
A strikingly (birch-)tree could become an address-defining feature

Berkhof or Berkhoff is a surname from Dutch and German origin. The name falls under the so-called farm names. Such a name served as an address in a time when street names were not commonly used. The name has two meanings. In the Netherlands that is 'birch-farm' or 'birch-farmhouse'. To leave no doubt there would have stood one or more birch tree(s) in the yard. In Germany the name means 'farm on a hill'. The name is here a variant of the surname Berghoff.

== Origin ==
Fairly common practice in farm names was that the lessee (tenant) of the farm and his family received the farm name as an addition behind the first name and the patronymic. Primarily, however, was the name connected to the farmhouse and the yard. This meant that a new, succeeding lessee and his family could also become known by the farm name. This way several unrelated families can have their name derived from one and the same farm. Because the lessee and his descendants that had left the farm, often continued in using the farm name by which they had become generally known. In The Netherlands as well as in Northwest-Germany several of these farms-of-origin are known. The oldest known references of these date from the early sixteenth and even one from the end of the fifteenth century.

== Notable persons with the surname ==
- Aster Berkhof, pseudonym of the Flemish writer Lode Van Den Bergh (1920–2020)
- Gé Berkhof (born 1934), Dutch Lieutenant General (ret.)
- Gerrit Berkhoff (1901–1996), Dutch Chemist and first Rector Magnificus University Twente, The Netherlands
- Hendrikus Berkhof (1914–1995), Dutch Preacher and Theologian
- Karel C. Berkhoff (born 1965), Dutch Historian
- Louis Berkhof (1873–1957), Dutch-American Theologian
- Steven Berkoff (born 1937), British actor
- Wicher Berkhoff (Russian: Vasily Ivanovich Berkov), (1794–1870), Dutch-Russian shipbuilder
- Willem Berkhoff (1863–1953), Dutch Pastry Chef and founder first Dutch Vocational School for Pastry Chefs, in Amsterdam

== Sources ==
- Marnix Berkhoff, 'Surname History (version 04/01/2010)', website: Berkhof-Berkhoff. 1500-2000
