= Boniswil railway station =

Swiss railway station

Boniswil
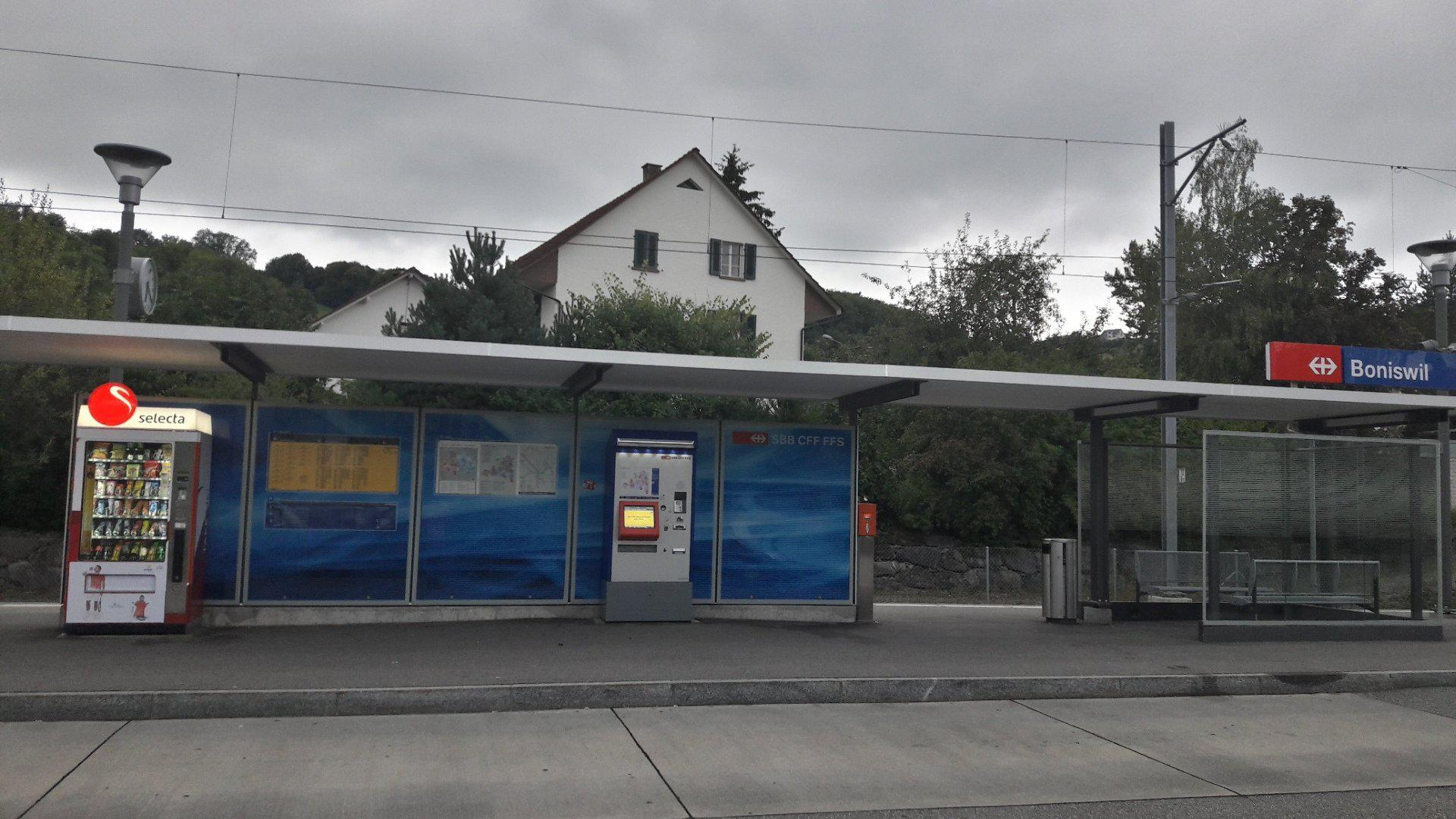
- The station platform in 2018

General information
- Location: Boniswil; Switzerland
- Coordinates: 47°18′54″N 8°11′04″E
- Owner: Swiss Federal Railways
- Line: Seetal line
- Train operators: Swiss Federal Railways

Services
Preceding station	Lucerne S-Bahn	Following station
Hallwil towards Lenzburg	S9	Birrwil towards Lucerne
Location
- Location within Switzerland Location within Canton of Aargau

Boniswil railway station (German: Bahnhof Boniswil) is a railway station in the municipality of Boniswil, in the Swiss canton of Aargau. It is an intermediate stop on the standard gauge Seetal line of Swiss Federal Railways.

== Services ==
The following services stop at Boniswil:

- Lucerne S-Bahn S9: half-hourly service between Lucerne and Lenzburg.
