= Birrwil railway station =

Swiss railway station

Birrwil
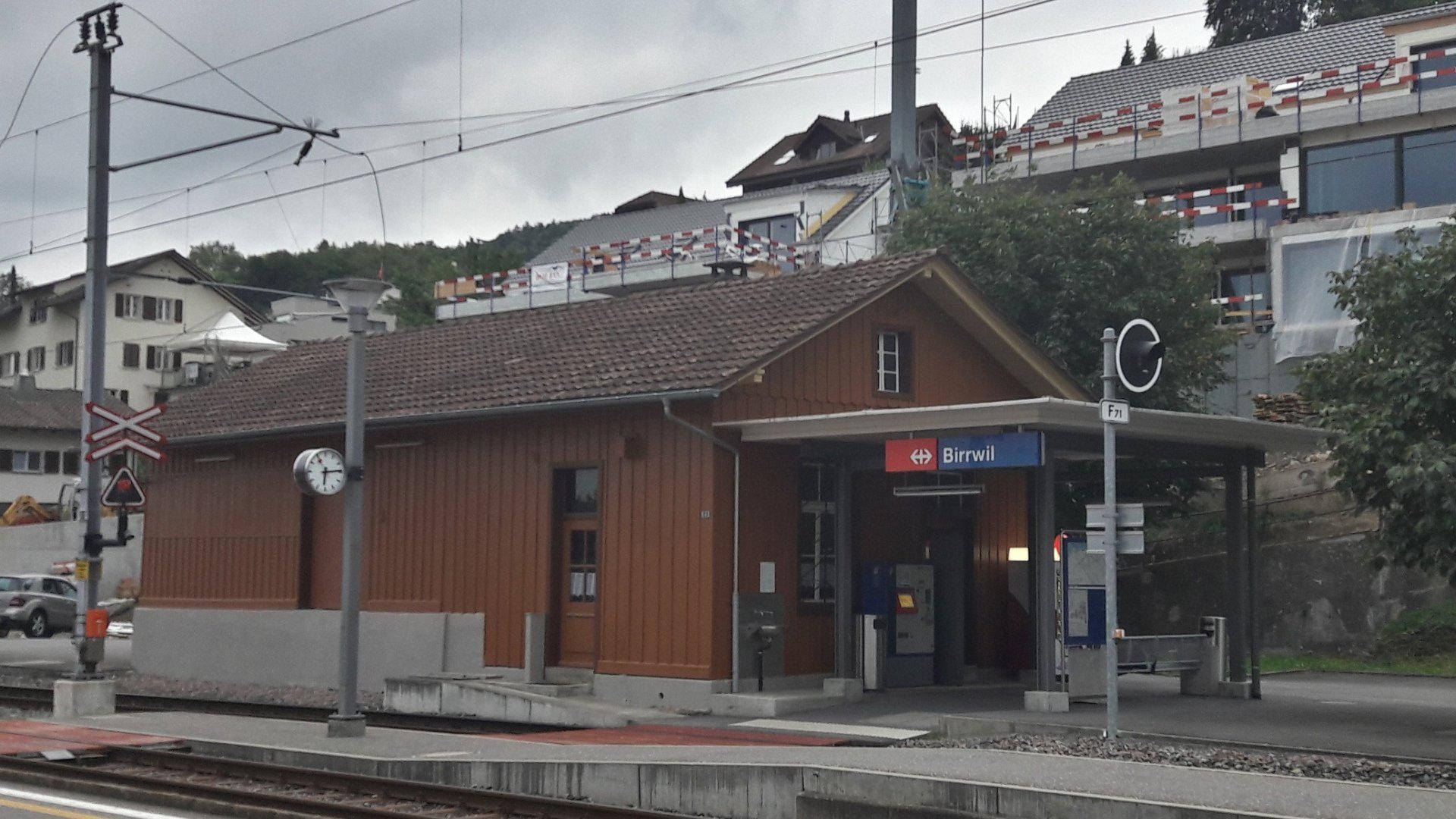
- The station building in 2018

General information
- Location: Birrwil; Switzerland
- Coordinates: 47°17′16″N 8°11′56″E
- Owner: Swiss Federal Railways
- Line: Seetal line
- Train operators: Swiss Federal Railways

Services
Preceding station	Lucerne S-Bahn	Following station
Boniswil towards Lenzburg	S9	Beinwil am See towards Lucerne
Location
- Location within Switzerland Location within Canton of Aargau

Birrwil railway station (German: Bahnhof Birrwil) is a railway station in the municipality of Birrwil, in the Swiss canton of Aargau. It is an intermediate stop on the standard gauge Seetal line of Swiss Federal Railways.

== Services ==
The following services stop at Birrwil:

- Lucerne S-Bahn S9: half-hourly service between Lucerne and Lenzburg.
