= Ermensee railway station =

Swiss railway station

Ermensee
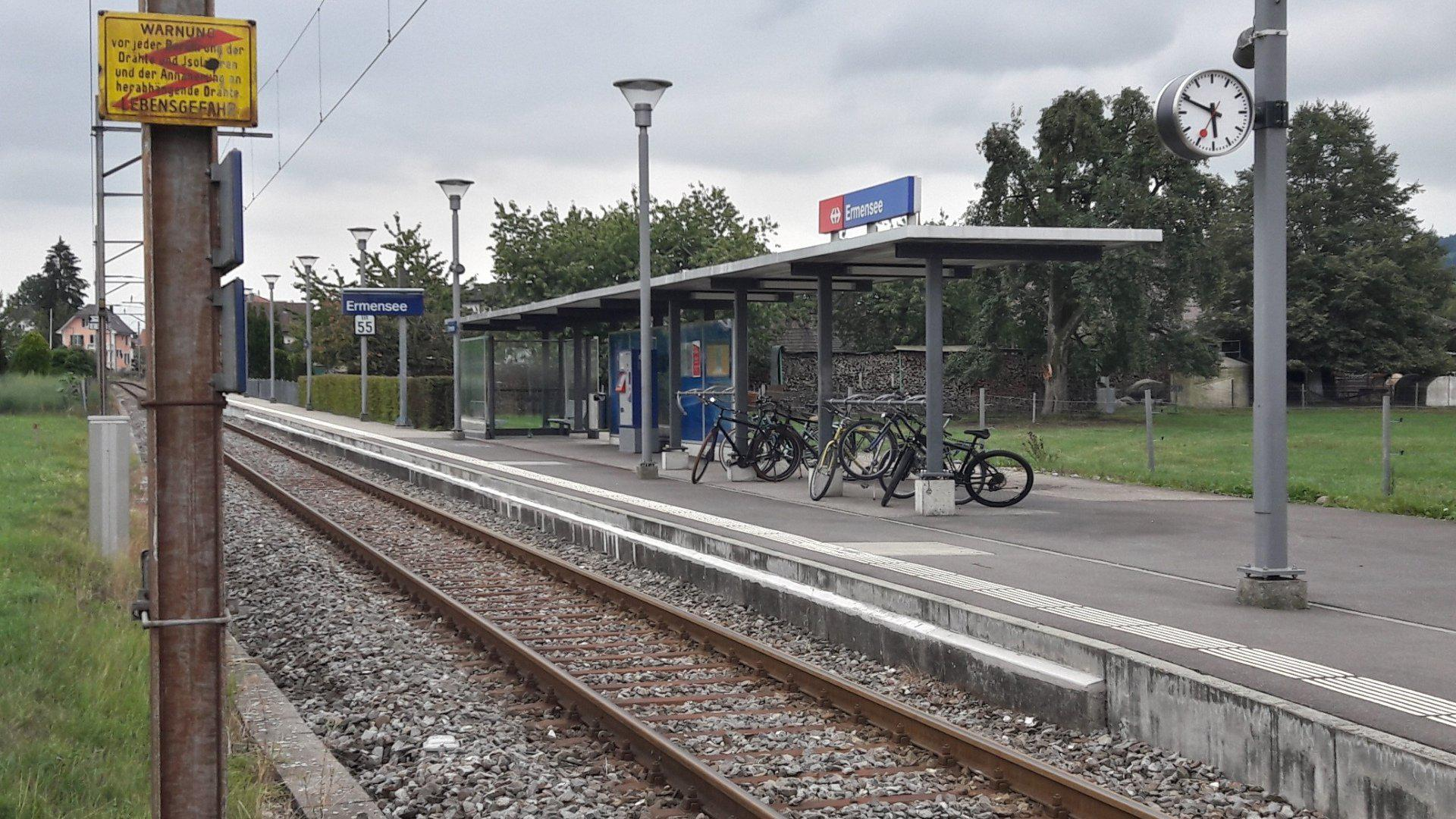
- The station in 2018

General information
- Location: Ermensee; Switzerland
- Coordinates: 47°13′47″N 8°14′32″E
- Owner: Swiss Federal Railways
- Line: Seetal line
- Train operators: Swiss Federal Railways

Services
| Preceding station | Lucerne S-Bahn | Following station |
|---|---|---|
| Mosen towards Lenzburg | S9 | Hitzkirch towards Lucerne |
Location
- Location within Switzerland Location within Canton of Lucerne

Ermensee railway station (German: Bahnhof Ermensee) is a railway station in the municipality of Ermensee, in the Swiss canton of Lucerne. It is an intermediate stop on the standard gauge Seetal line of Swiss Federal Railways.

== Services ==
The following services stop at Ermensee:

- Lucerne S-Bahn S9: half-hourly service between Lucerne and Lenzburg.
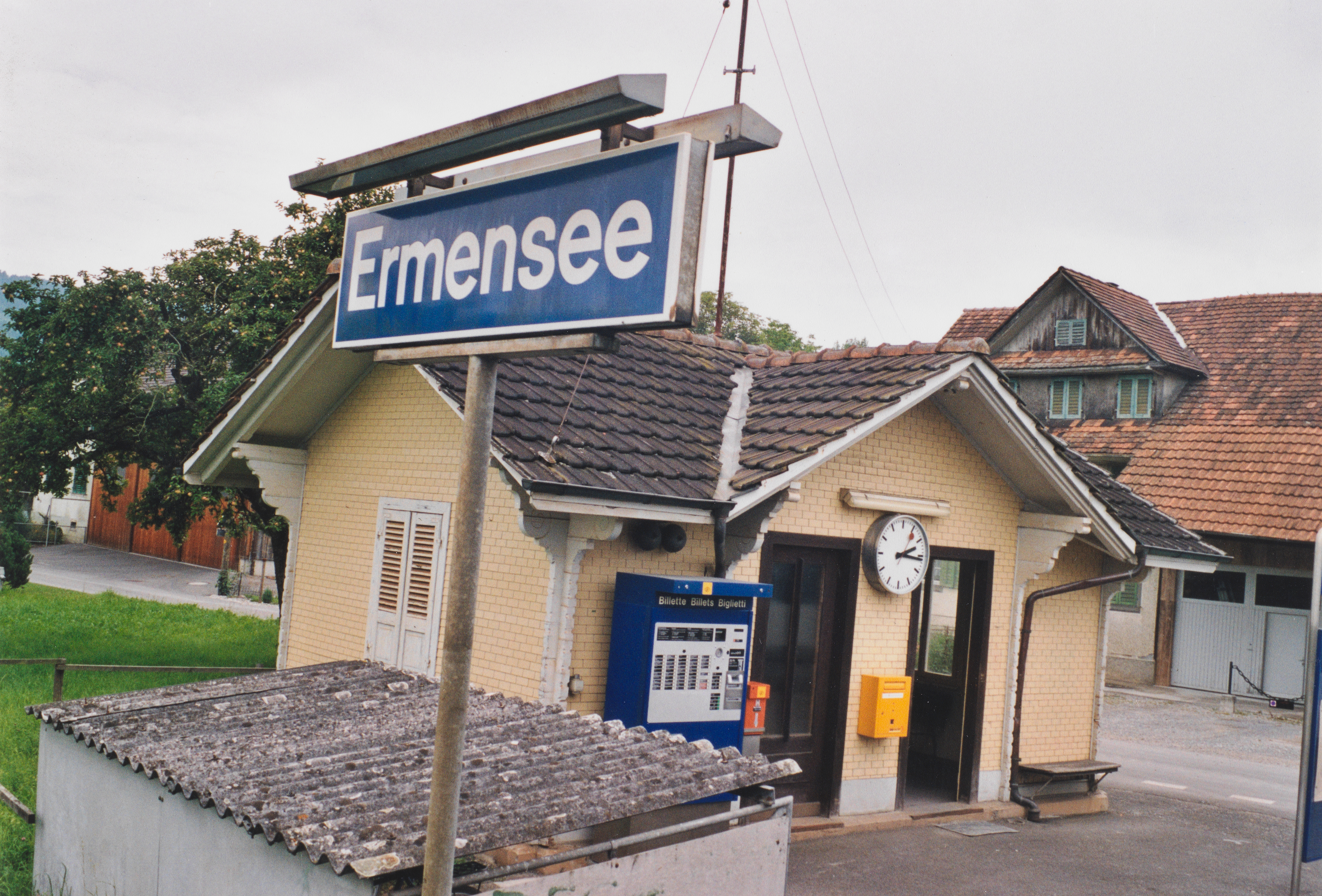
Station in 2002
