= Hallwil railway station =

Swiss railway station

Hallwil
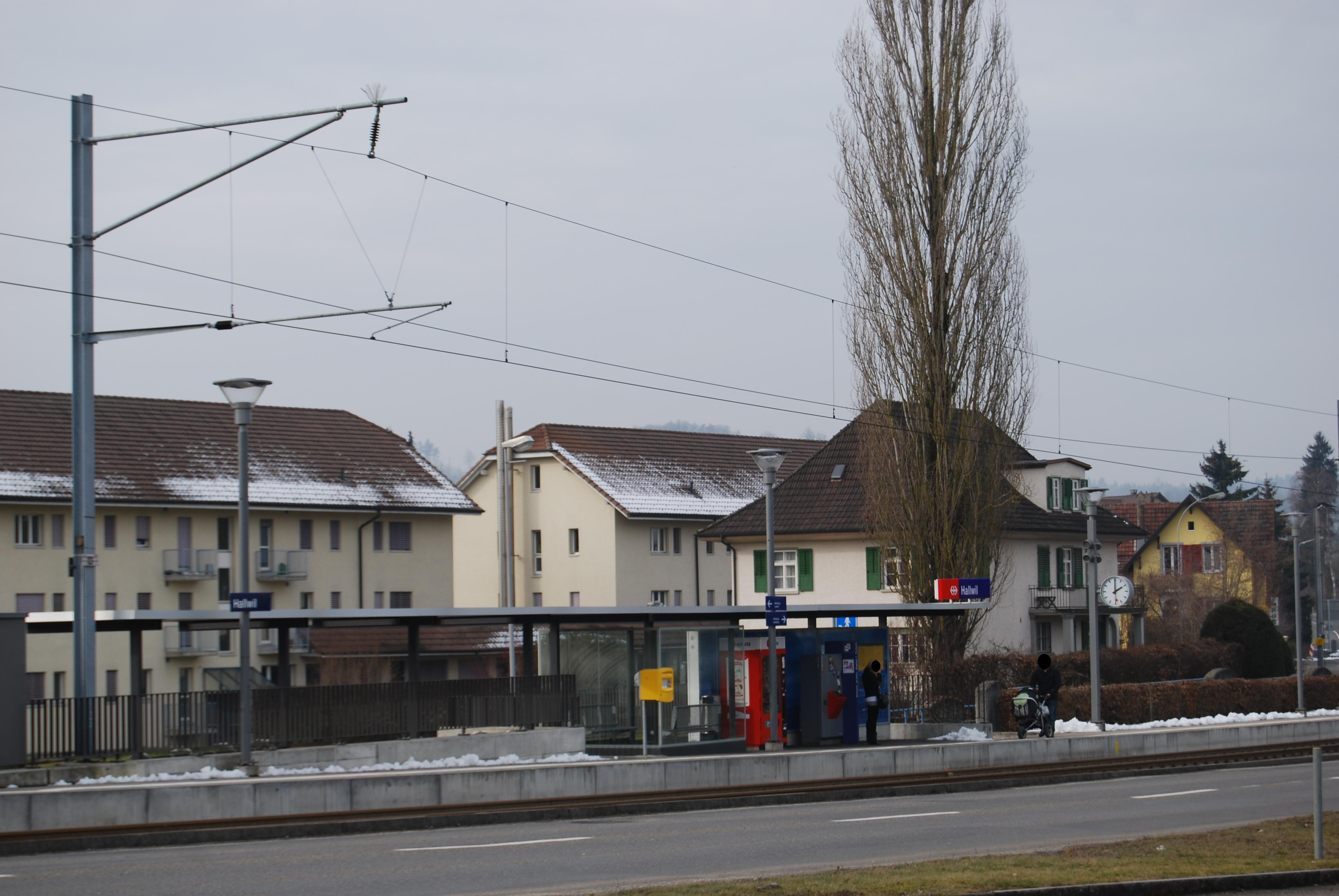
- The station platform in 2010

General information
- Location: Hallwil; Switzerland
- Coordinates: 47°19′43″N 8°10′33″E
- Owner: Swiss Federal Railways
- Line: Seetal line
- Train operators: Swiss Federal Railways

History
- Former names: Hallwil-Dürrenäsch

Services
Preceding station	Lucerne S-Bahn	Following station
Seon towards Lenzburg	S9	Boniswil towards Lucerne
Location
- Location within Switzerland Location within Canton of Aargau

Hallwil railway station (German: Bahnhof Hallwil) is a railway station in the municipality of Hallwil, in the Swiss canton of Aargau. It is an intermediate stop on the standard gauge Seetal line of Swiss Federal Railways.

== Services ==
The following services stop at Hallwil:

- Lucerne S-Bahn S9: half-hourly service between Lucerne and Lenzburg.
