= Seon railway station =

Swiss railway station

Seon
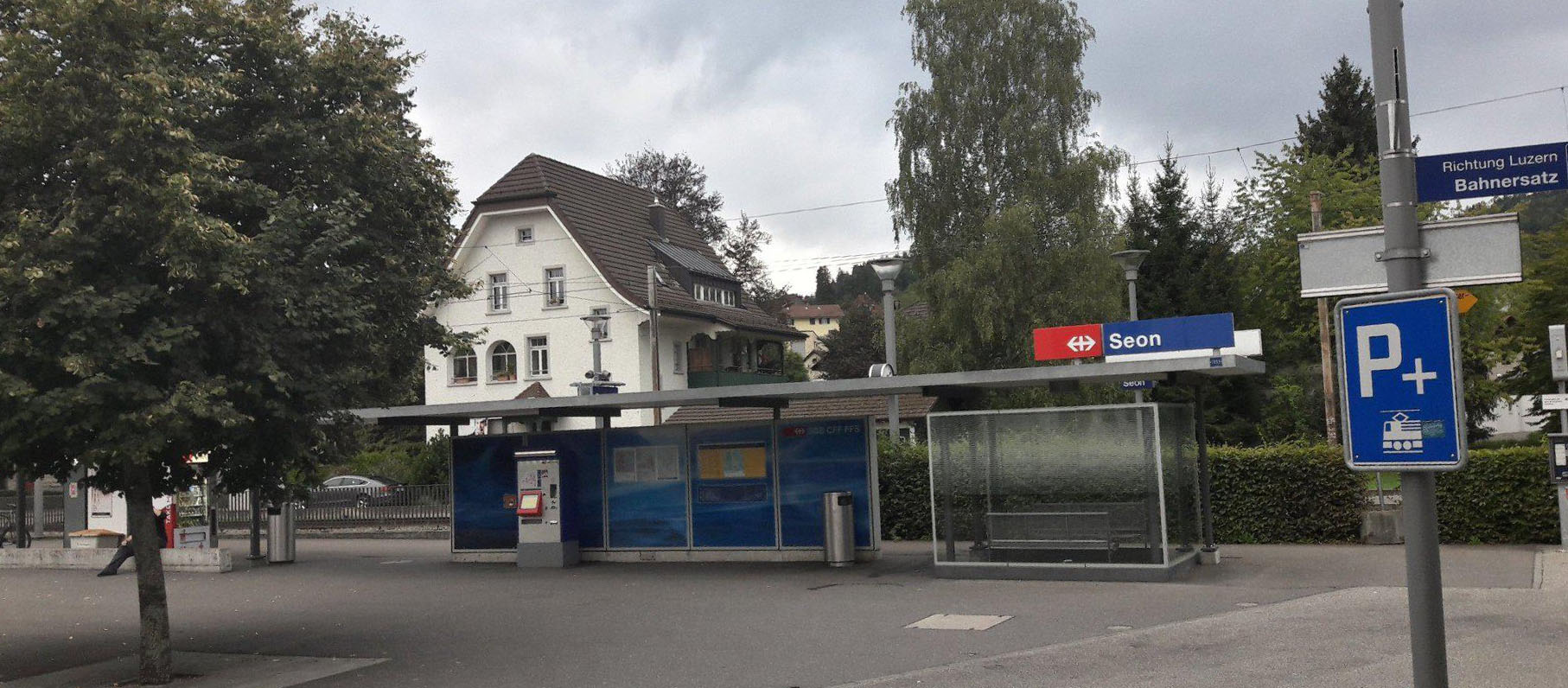
- The station platform in 2010

General information
- Location: Seon; Switzerland
- Coordinates: 47°20′46″N 8°09′32″E
- Owner: Swiss Federal Railways
- Line: Seetal line
- Train operators: Swiss Federal Railways

Services
Preceding station	Lucerne S-Bahn	Following station
Seon Nord towards Lenzburg	S9	Hallwil towards Lucerne
Location
- Location within Switzerland Location within Canton of Aargau

Seon railway station (German: Bahnhof Seon) is a railway station in the municipality of Seon, in the Swiss canton of Aargau. It is an intermediate stop on the standard gauge Seetal line of Swiss Federal Railways.

== Services ==
The following services stop at Seon:

- Lucerne S-Bahn S9: half-hourly service between Lucerne and Lenzburg.
