= Beinwil am See railway station =

Swiss railway station

Beinwil am See
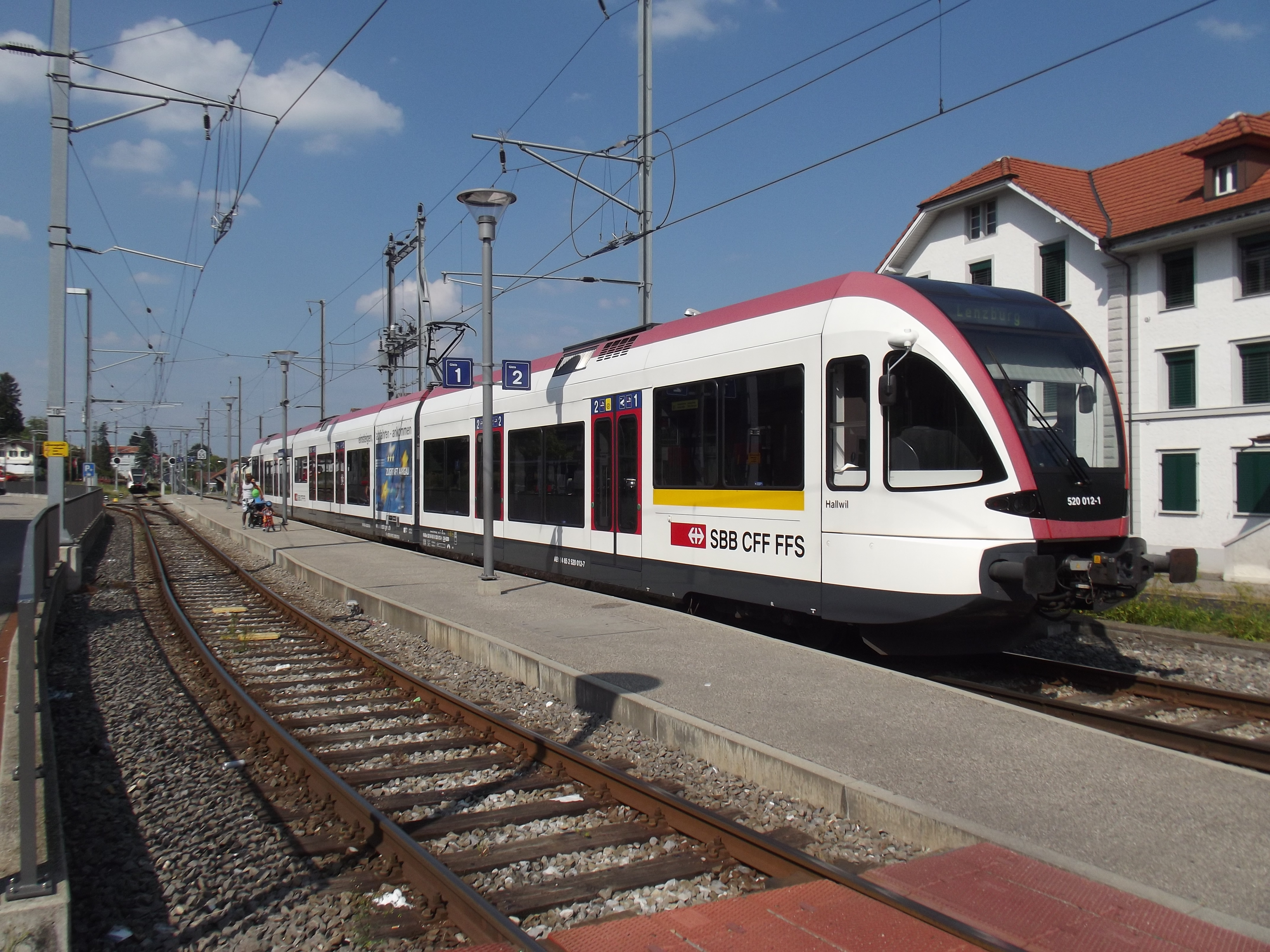
- An SBB train at the station in 2013

General information
- Location: Beinwil am See; Switzerland
- Coordinates: 47°16′02″N 8°12′08″E
- Owner: Swiss Federal Railways
- Lines: Seetal line; Beinwil am See–Beromünster (1887–2001)
- Distance: 27.2 kilometres (16.9 mi) from Emmenbrücke
- Train operators: Swiss Federal Railways

History
- Opened: 3 September 1883

Services
Preceding station	Lucerne S-Bahn	Following station
Birrwil towards Lenzburg	S9	Mosen towards Lucerne
Location

Beinwil am See railway station (German: Bahnhof Beinwil am See) is a railway station in the municipality of Beinwil am See, in the Swiss canton of Aargau. It is an intermediate stop on the standard gauge Seetal line of Swiss Federal Railways.

== History ==
The Seetal railway line was opened between Emmenbrücke and Beinwil am See on 3 September 1883. The Beinwil am See–Beromünster branch line was completed on 23 January 1887. Passenger service on that branch ended on May 31, 1992; freight service ended in July 2001.

== Services ==
The following services stop at Beinwil am See:

- Lucerne S-Bahn S9: half-hourly service between Lucerne and Lenzburg.
