= Hitzkirch railway station =

Swiss railway station

Hitzkirch
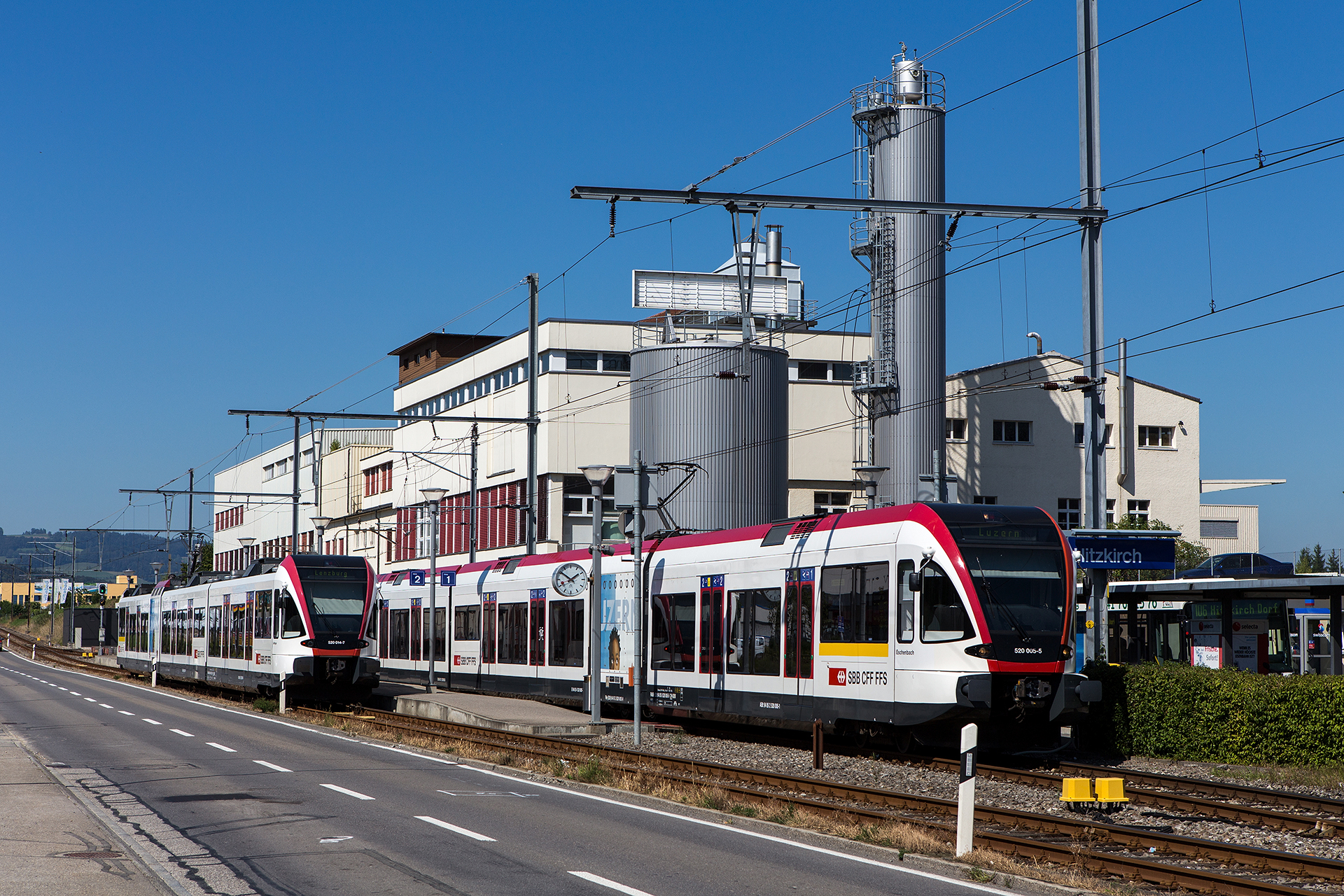
- Two SBB trains at the station in 2016

General information
- Location: Hitzkirch; Switzerland
- Coordinates: 47°13′22″N 8°15′07″E
- Owner: Swiss Federal Railways
- Line: Seetal line
- Train operators: Swiss Federal Railways

Services
Preceding station	Lucerne S-Bahn	Following station
Ermensee towards Lenzburg	S9	Gelfingen towards Lucerne
Location
- Location within Switzerland Location within Canton of Lucerne

Hitzkirch railway station (German: Bahnhof Hitzkirch) is a railway station in the municipality of Hitzkirch, in the Swiss canton of Lucerne. It is an intermediate stop on the standard gauge Seetal line of Swiss Federal Railways.

== Services ==
The following services stop at Hitzkirch:

- Lucerne S-Bahn S9: half-hourly service between Lucerne and Lenzburg.
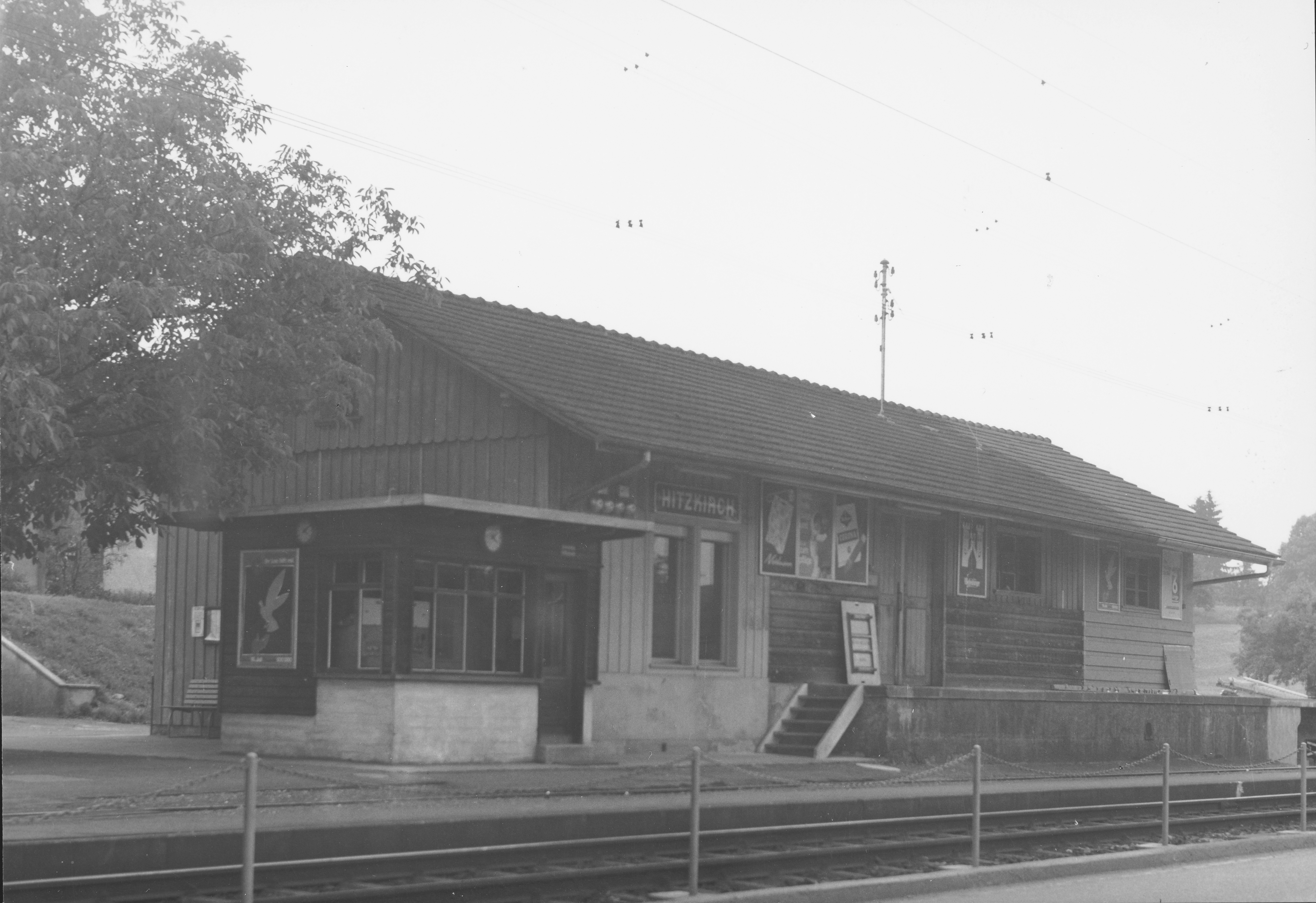
Station in 1964

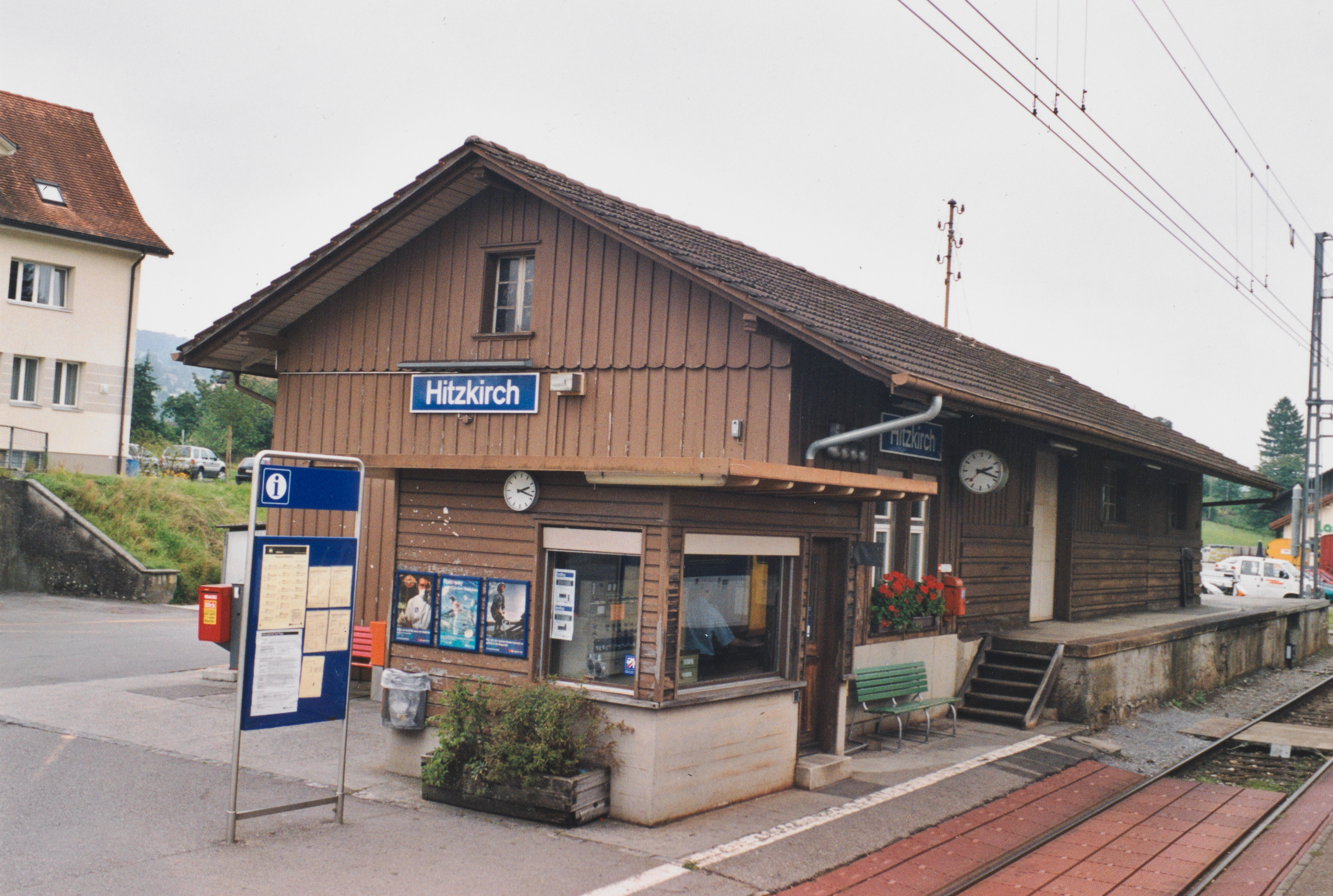
Station in 2002

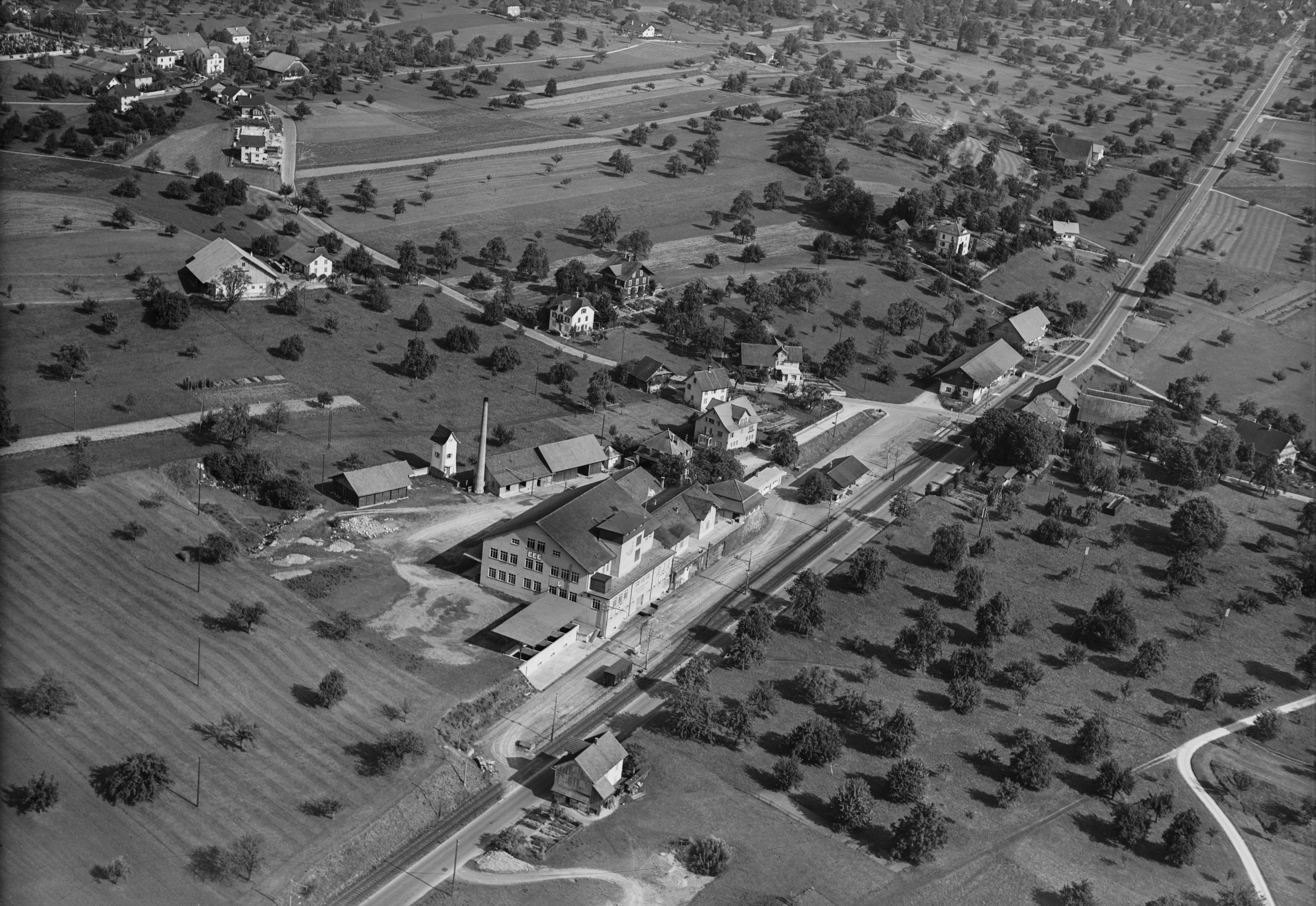
Aerial view in 1953
