= Mosen railway station =

Swiss railway station

Mosen
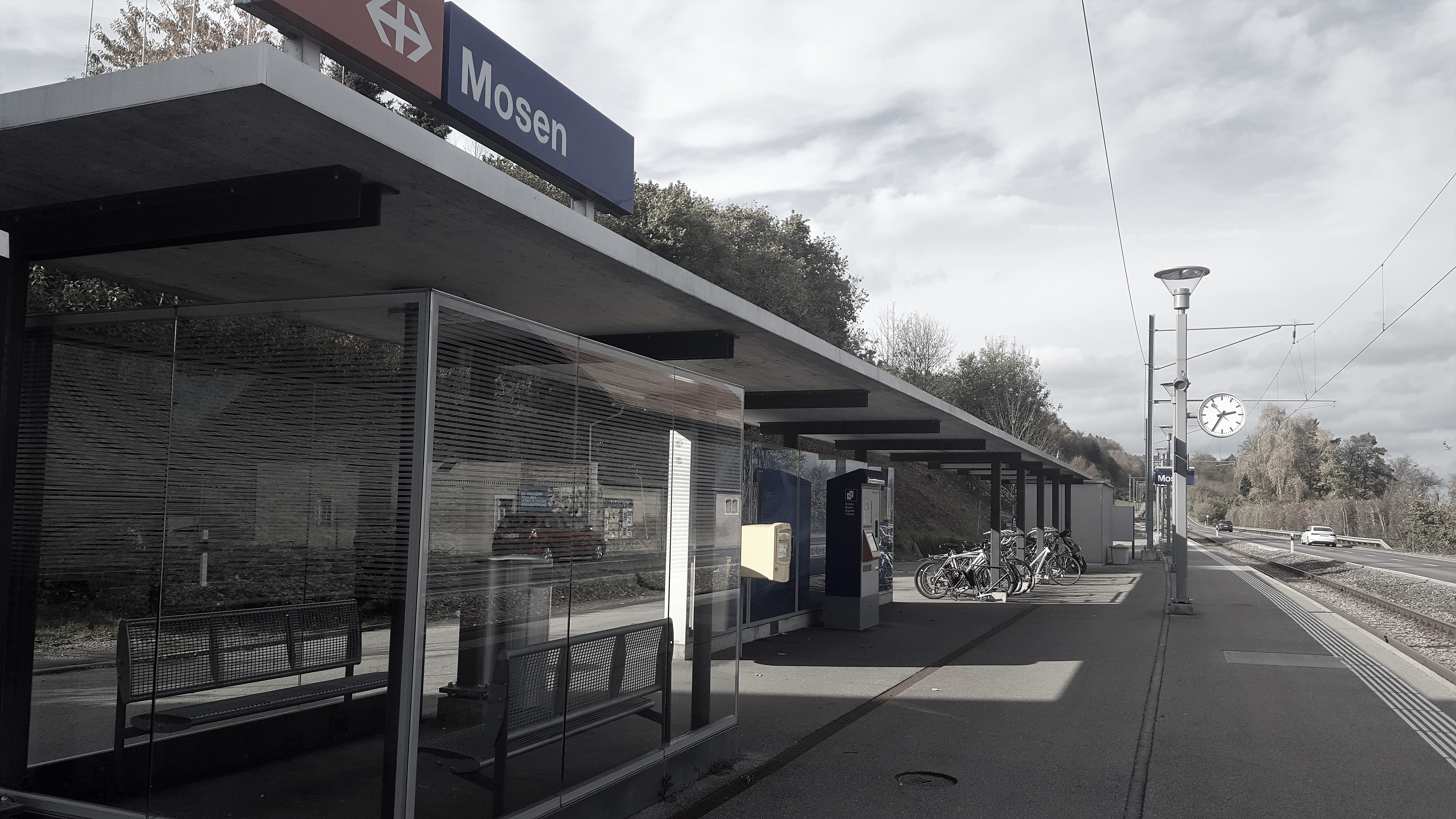
- The station in 2017

General information
- Location: Hitzkirch; Switzerland
- Coordinates: 47°14′39″N 8°13′27″E
- Owner: Swiss Federal Railways
- Line: Seetal line
- Train operators: Swiss Federal Railways

Services
Preceding station	Lucerne S-Bahn	Following station
Beinwil am See towards Lenzburg	S9	Ermensee towards Lucerne
Location
- Location within Switzerland Location within Canton of Lucerne

Mosen railway station (German: Bahnhof Mosen) is a railway station in the municipality of Hitzkirch, in the Swiss canton of Lucerne. It is an intermediate stop on the standard gauge Seetal line of Swiss Federal Railways.

== Services ==
The following services stop at Mosen:

- Lucerne S-Bahn S9: half-hourly service between Lucerne and Lenzburg.

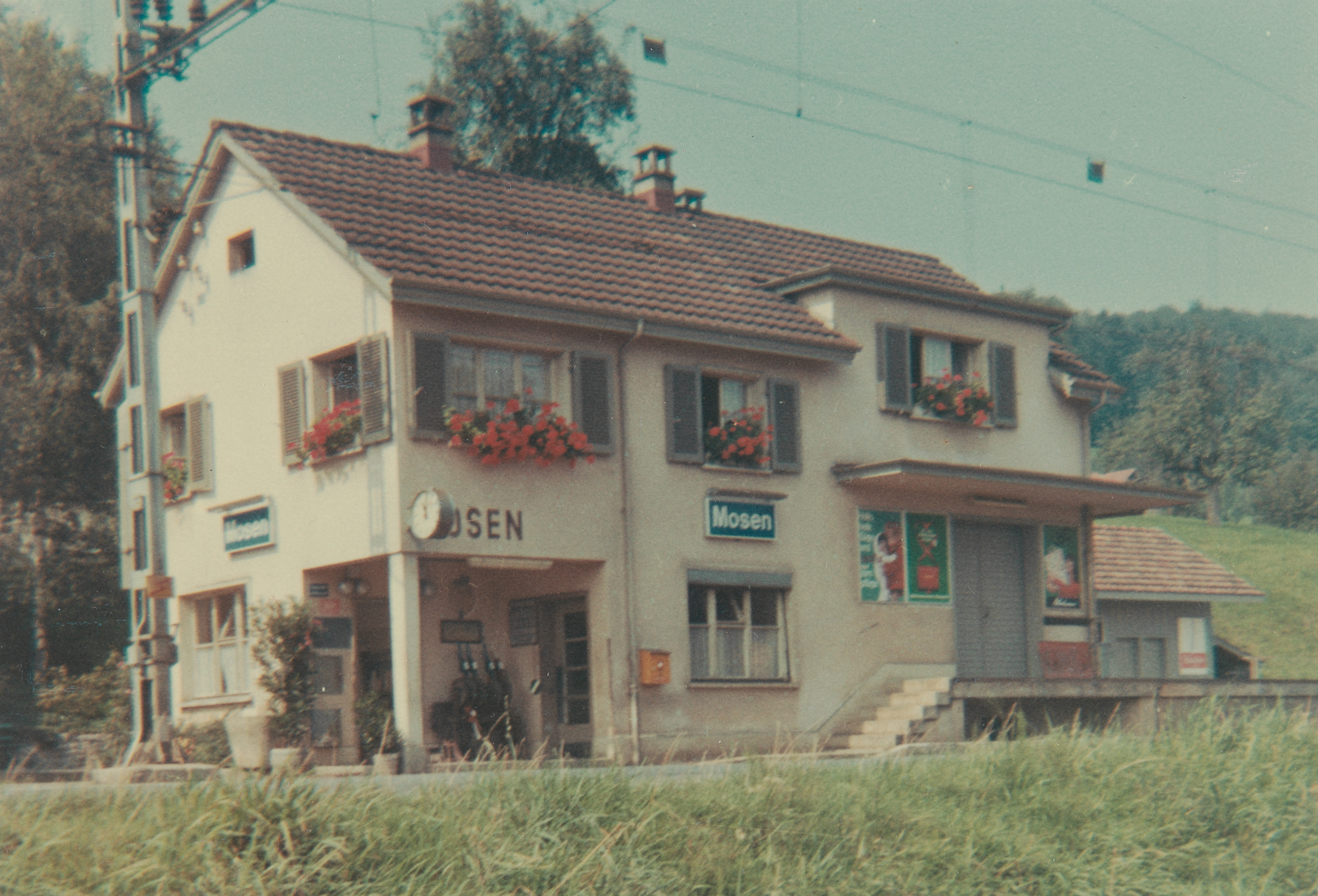
station building, ca. 1965

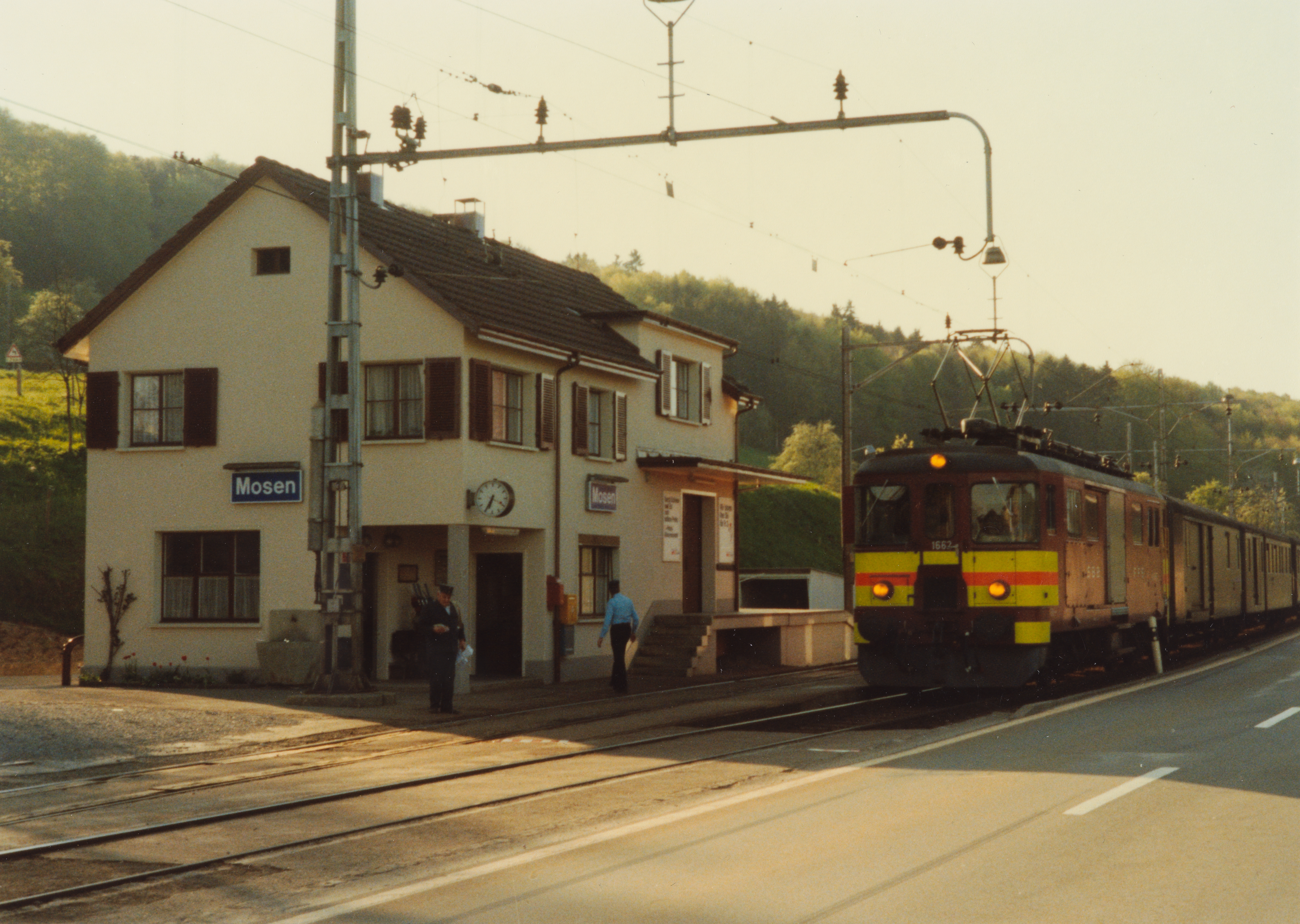
station building, ca. 1982

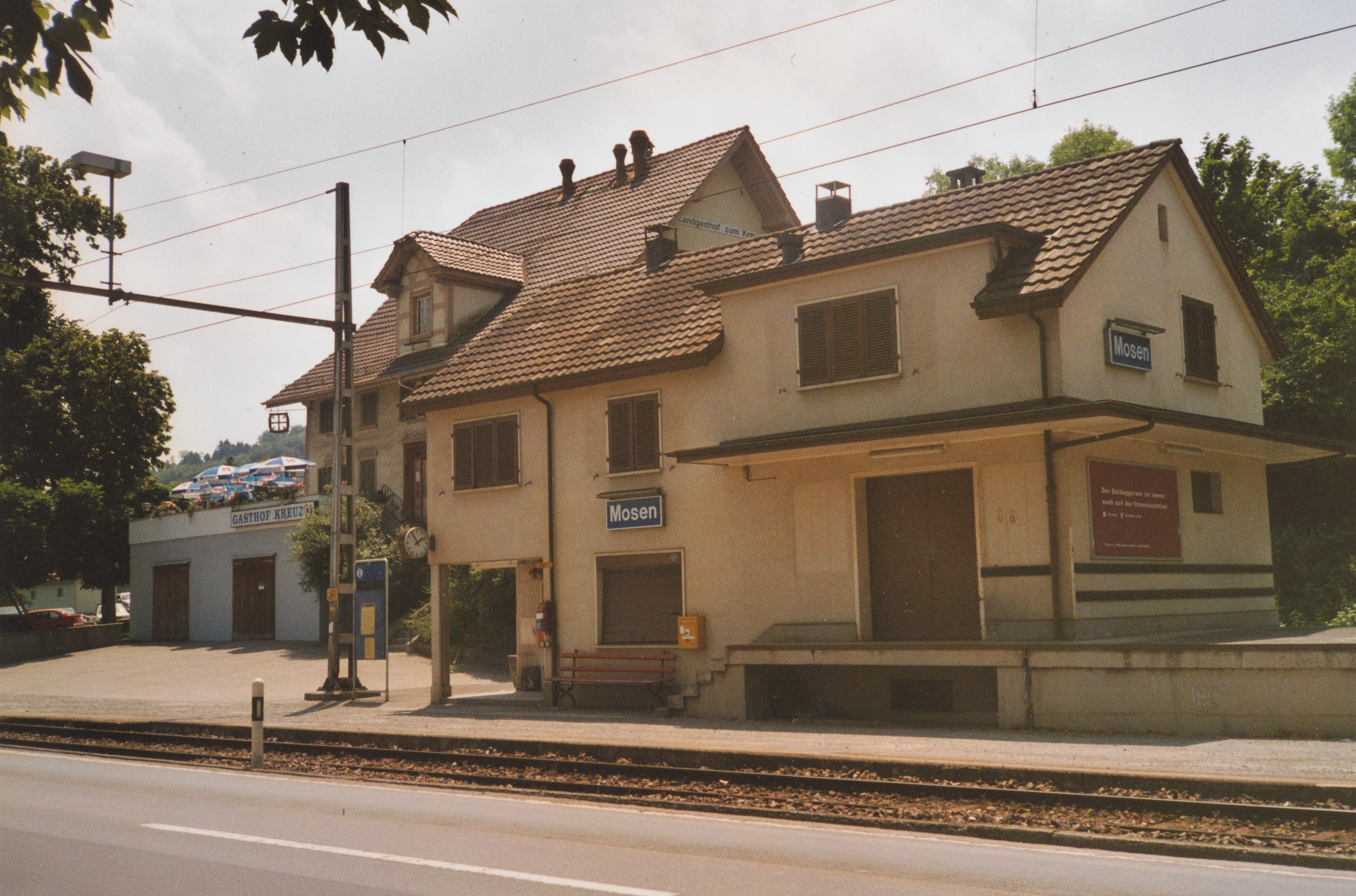
station building, 2002
