= Lucerne Cheese Festival =

Food festival in Lucerne, Switzerland

Coordinates: 47.1638°N 8.1048°E

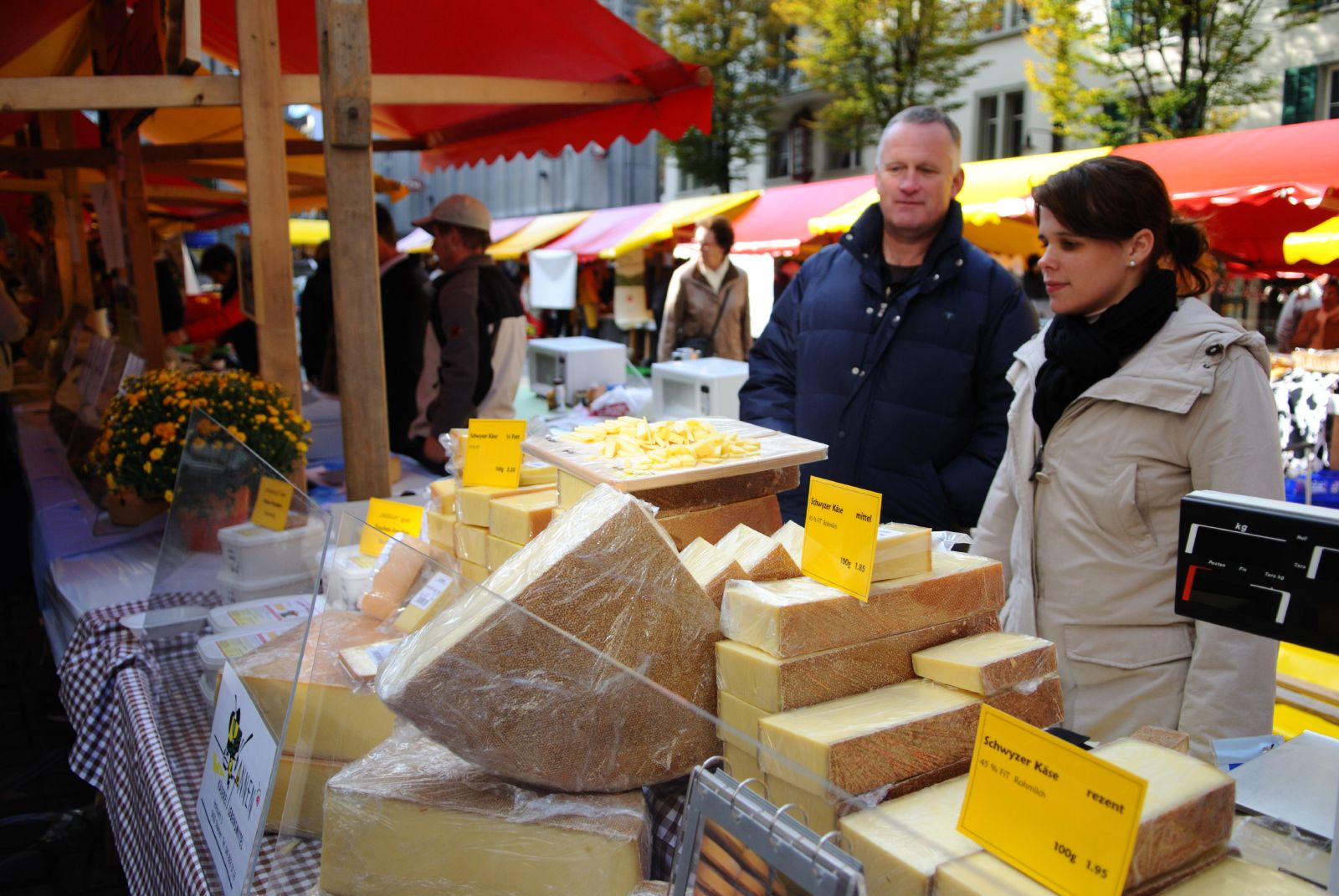
A wedge of cheese

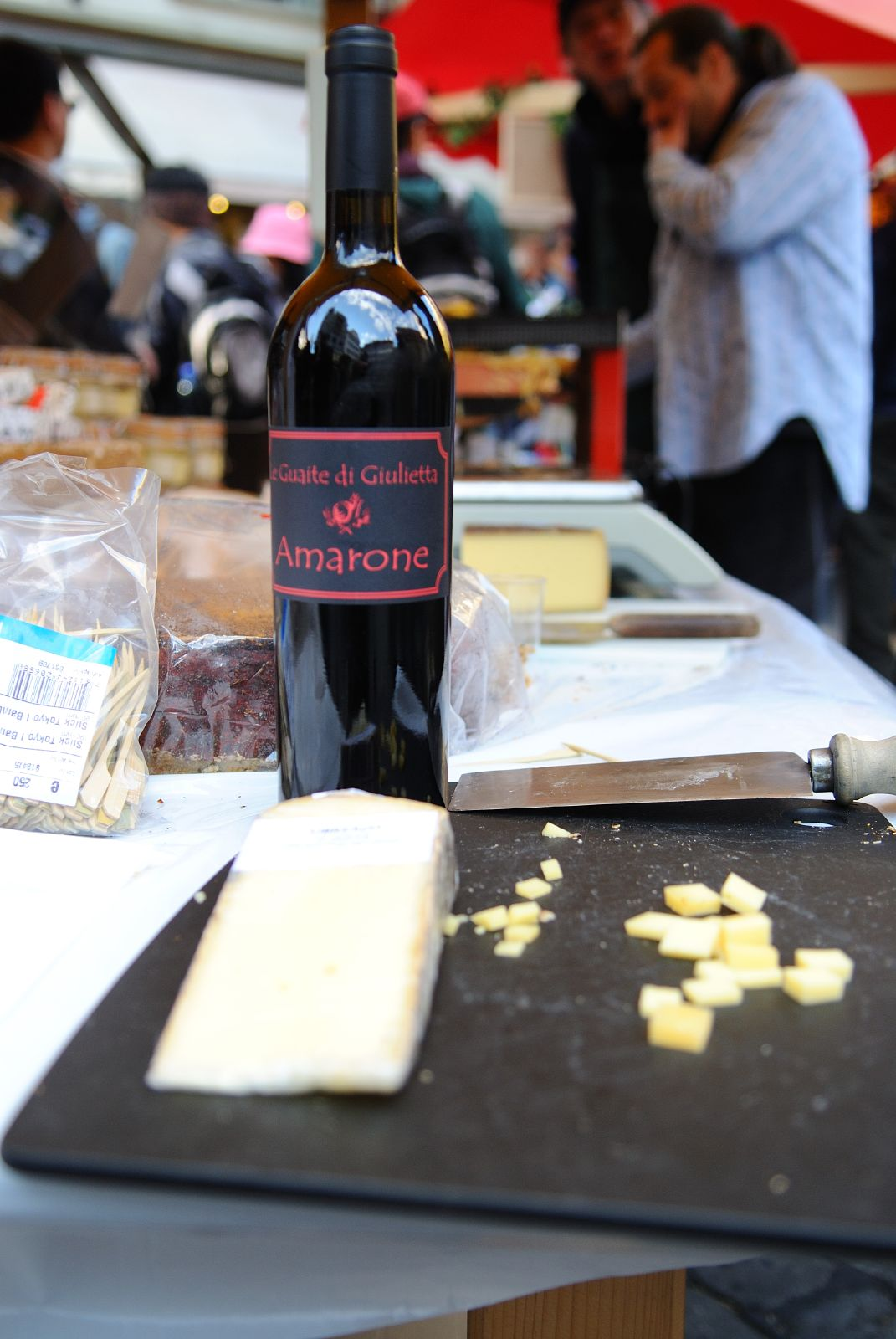
Cheese-based products

The Lucerne Cheese Festival (German: Käsefest Luzern) is a cheese festival held annually in Lucerne, Switzerland. It was established in 2001 and is normally run on a weekend in the middle of October at the Kapellplatz (Chapel Square) in the city centre. The next festival is planned to take place on 14 October 2023.

The event features the biggest cheese market in central Switzerland, and offers the greatest selection of cheeses. As well as the cheese market and live demonstrations of cheesemaking, typical events during the festival include a milking competition and music such as the Swiss alphorn.

The 2012 event featured over 200 varieties of cheese over 23 market stalls, including goat and sheep cheese. The 2020 event was almost cancelled because of social distancing restrictions during the COVID-19 pandemic, but was approved a few days before with a strict requirement to wear masks. Instead of the Kapellplatz, the festival was run from the nearby Kurplatz (Spa Square). 288 variety of cheeses were available at the festival, including cheesemakers from outside the local region such as the Bernese Jura and Ticino, who had their own festivals cancelled. Around 5,800 people attended the festival, lower than the previous year, with around two-thirds fewer sales. The following year's event continued restrictions, where customers had to taste and buy cheese at a distance, though masks were no longer mandatory. The 2022 event featured demonstrations of the cheese making process, a chalet built of Swiss cheese, and a "cheese chalet" hosting cheese fondue and raclette.

India Times in 2014 called it out as one of 10 world food festivals for foodies.
