= Jesuit Church, Lucerne =

Church in Lucerne, Switzerland

Coordinates: 47.051°N 8.305°E

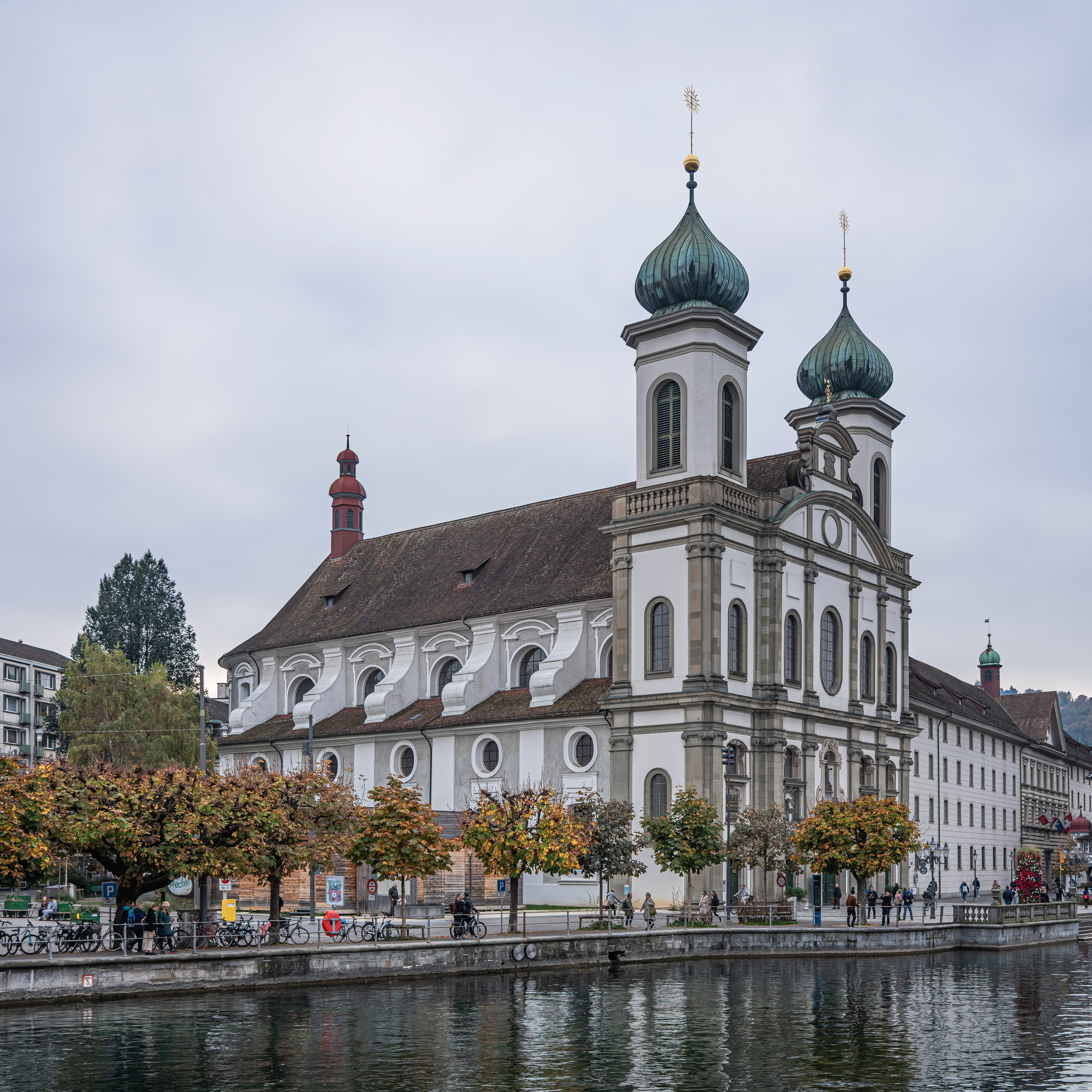
Jesuit Church along the river Reuss

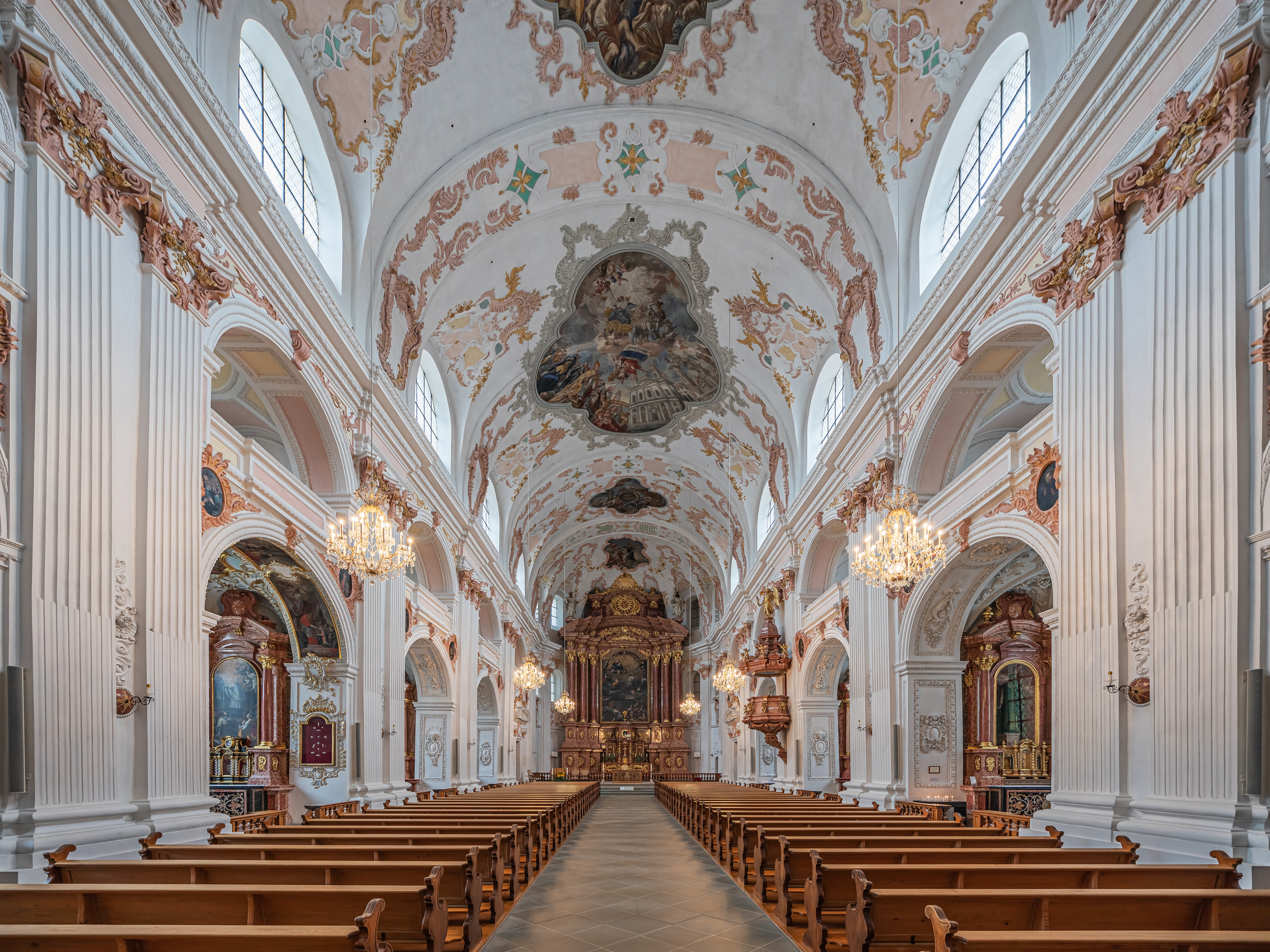
Interior view

The Lucerne Jesuit Church is a Catholic church in Lucerne, Switzerland. It is the first large Baroque church built in Switzerland north of the Alps.

The Jesuit order, founded by Ignatius of Loyola in 1534, were active participants in the Counter-Reformation, the Catholic fight against the birth of Protestantism. Protestant reformers such as Zwingli in Zurich and Calvin in Geneva divided the predominantly Catholic Switzerland. In response, the Jesuits were called in to Lucerne by the city council in 1573 to establish a college. Ludwig Pfyffer, mayor of Lucerne, offered annual financial support to the Jesuits out of his private funds. The Jesuit College of Lucerne was established in 1577 in Ritter Palace, a building originally erected in 1557 as a residence for mayor Lux Ritter.

Construction on the associated church began in 1667. By 1673 the shell of the church and the main façade were completed. The church was consecrated in 1677, though the interior was not yet really finished. Several side altars were still missing and even the high altar was only erected four years later, due to financial problems. The onion topped towers were not completed until 1893. The vault was redecorated in the mid-18th century. The original vestments of Brother Klaus, a famous Swiss patron, are stored in the inner chapel.

== See also ==
- List of Jesuit sites
