= Dietschibergbahn =

Former funicular railway in Lucerne, Switzerland

Overview
- Status: Ceased operation
- Owner: Dietschibergbahn AG
- Locale: Lucerne, Switzerland
- Termini: "Luzern, Halde"; Dietschiberg
- Stations: 2

Service
- Type: Funicular
- Operator(s): Dietschibergbahn AG

History
- Opened: 10 August 1912
- Fire at upper station: 26 April 1977
- Closed: 30 September 1978

Technical
- Line length: 1,240 m (4,070 ft)
- Number of tracks: 1 with passing loop
- Track gauge: 1,000 mm (3 ft 3 3/8 in)
- Electrification: from opening
- Operating speed: 2.1 metres per second (6.9 ft/s)
- Highest elevation: 628 m (2,060 ft)
- Maximum incline: 24.7% (min. 9%)

Dietschibergbahn was a funicular railway at Lucerne, Switzerland. The line ran from the city to Dietschiberg at 628 m. The hill, 210 m above Lake Lucerne, was also known as "Little Rigi" (Kleiner Rigi). The line had length of 1240 m and an incline between 9 and 25%. The funicular with two cars had a single track with a passing loop. After the restaurant burned down in 1977, the funicular ceased operations in September 1978.

== History ==
The history of the funicular begins on 21 March 1869 when Alexander Trautweiler and Max Stocker submitted an application for a license for a funicular from Warten street to Landhaus Dietschuberg. The license was established on 17 June 1896 for 80 years with the condition that construction began at the latest within 18 months and that the funicular was operational within 18 months after the beginning of construction.

The ground work projects took five years alone and so the deadline for the project had to be extended a total of seven times. On 16 June 1911 the revised plans were submitted to the Federal Post and Railway Department. Although there were objections to the plans, construction began on 24 November 1911. The funicular opened to passengers on 10 August 1912.

At the upper station, there was a restaurant and a railroad model installation. On 26 April 1977 a fire destroyed the restaurant. The exact circumstances of the fire are still not well understood. The restaurant was not rebuilt or replaced. With fewer tourists the funicular ceased operations on 30 September 1978 as a result of lower ridership. The model railway system was also removed to make way for a parking lot of a golf club. Despite efforts by the association Pro Dietschibergbahn and the company DBB-Betriebs AG, it was never revived.

The funicular had been owned by Dietschibergbahn AG. The company was wound up from 1999 to 2002. The lower station was converted into a private home. The cars were donated to the Swiss Museum of Transport.

== Current use ==
Today the train-cars, cables, and rails have almost all been removed or become overgrown with grass. In the lower areas there are remnants of the tracks, masts, and old arched route. The mountain station was converted to a residential building in 2008 and in 2016 the valley station was also converted to a residential building.

Location of stations:

- Lower: 47.056071°N 8.327161°E
- Upper: 47.063601°N 8.338651°E
