= Lucerne =

City in Switzerland

Lucerne Luzern
- Municipality
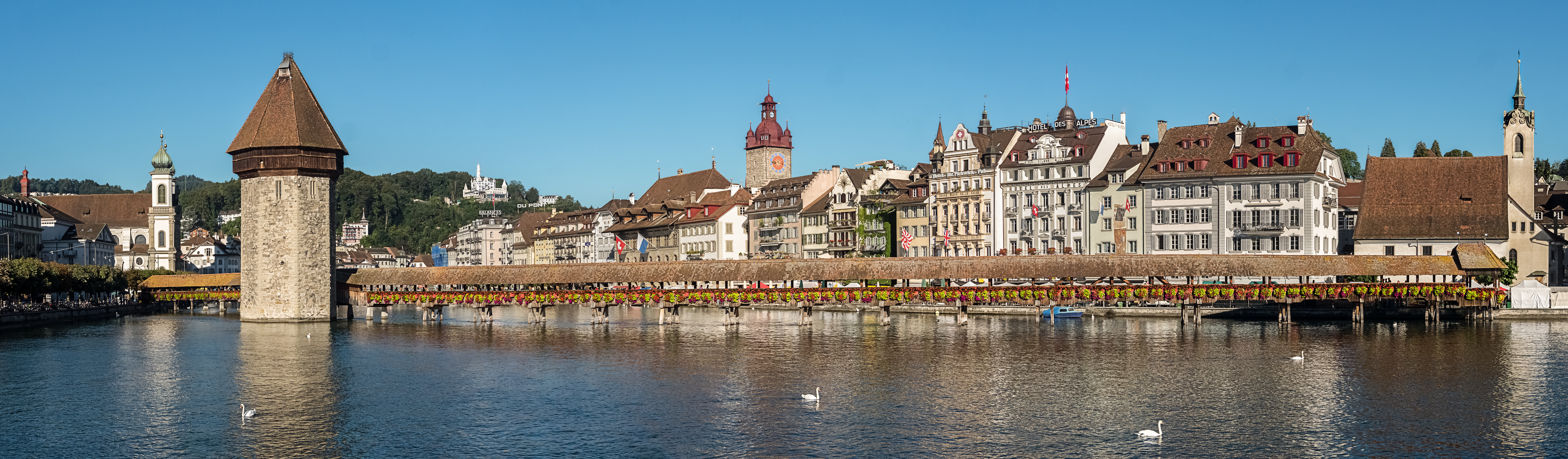
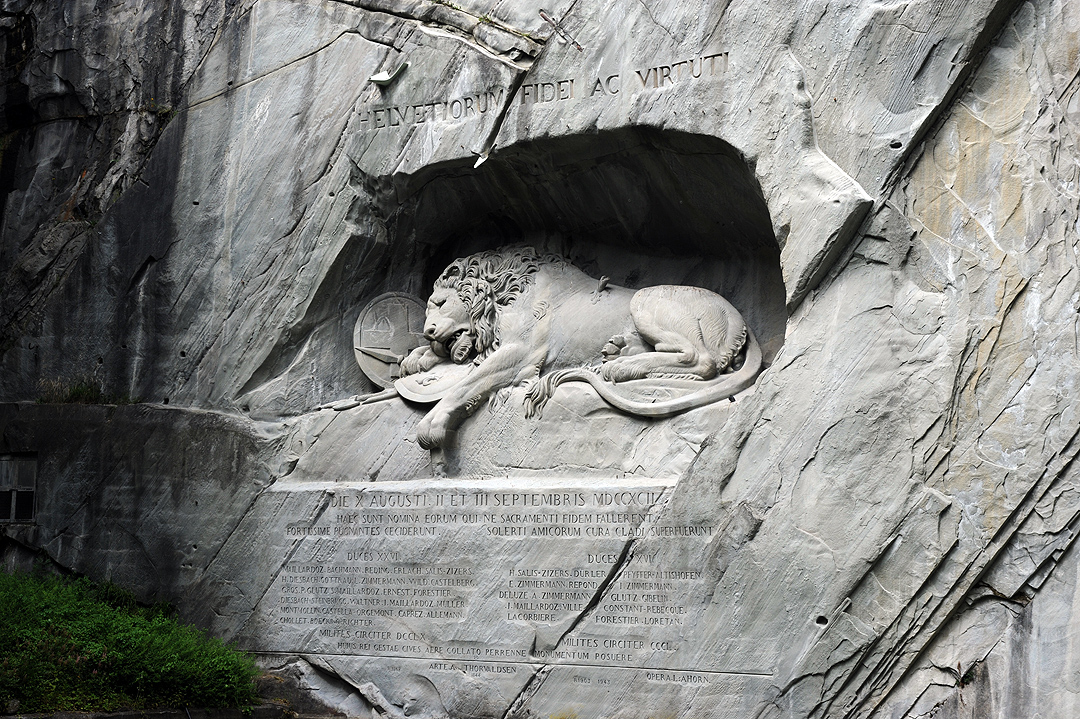
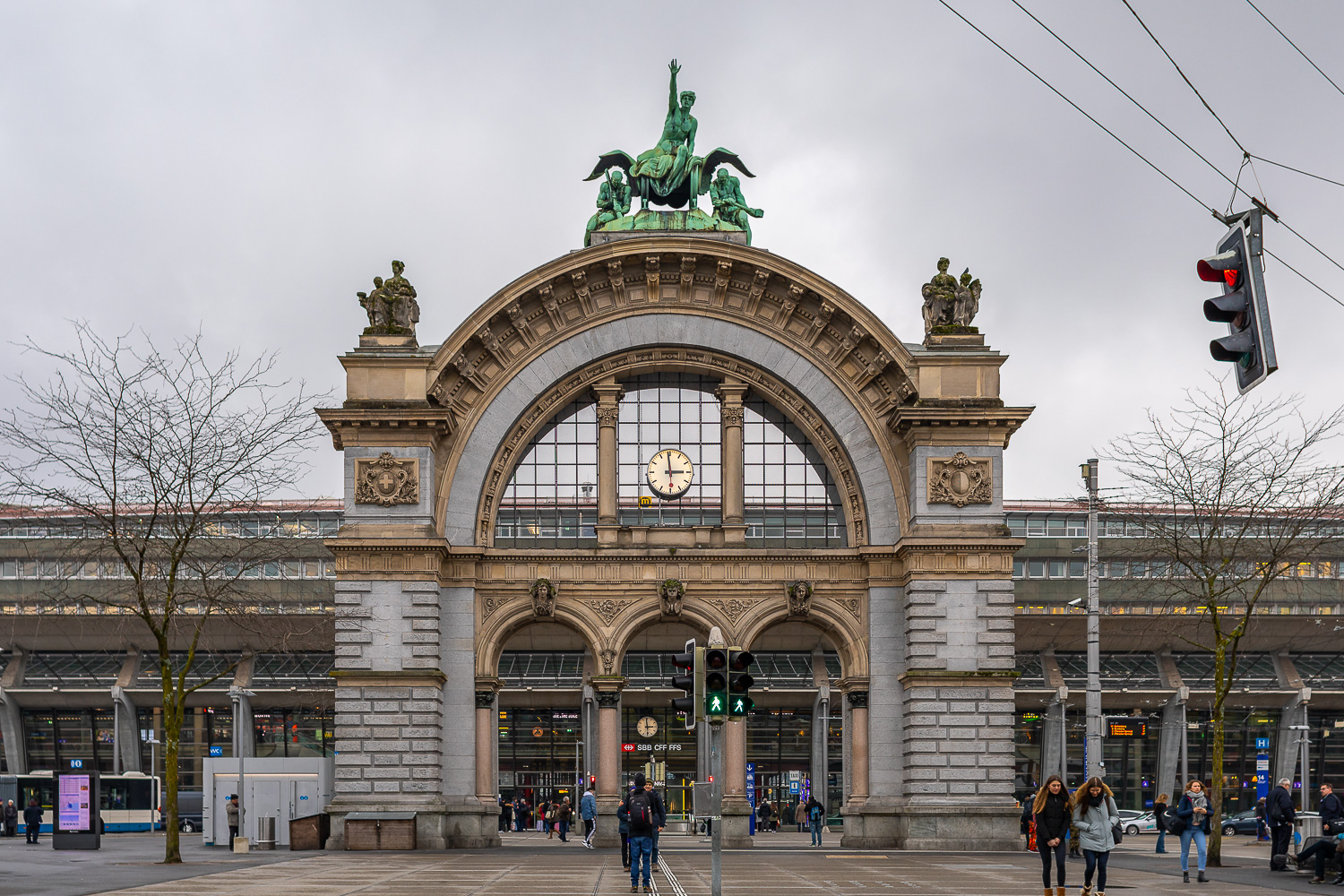
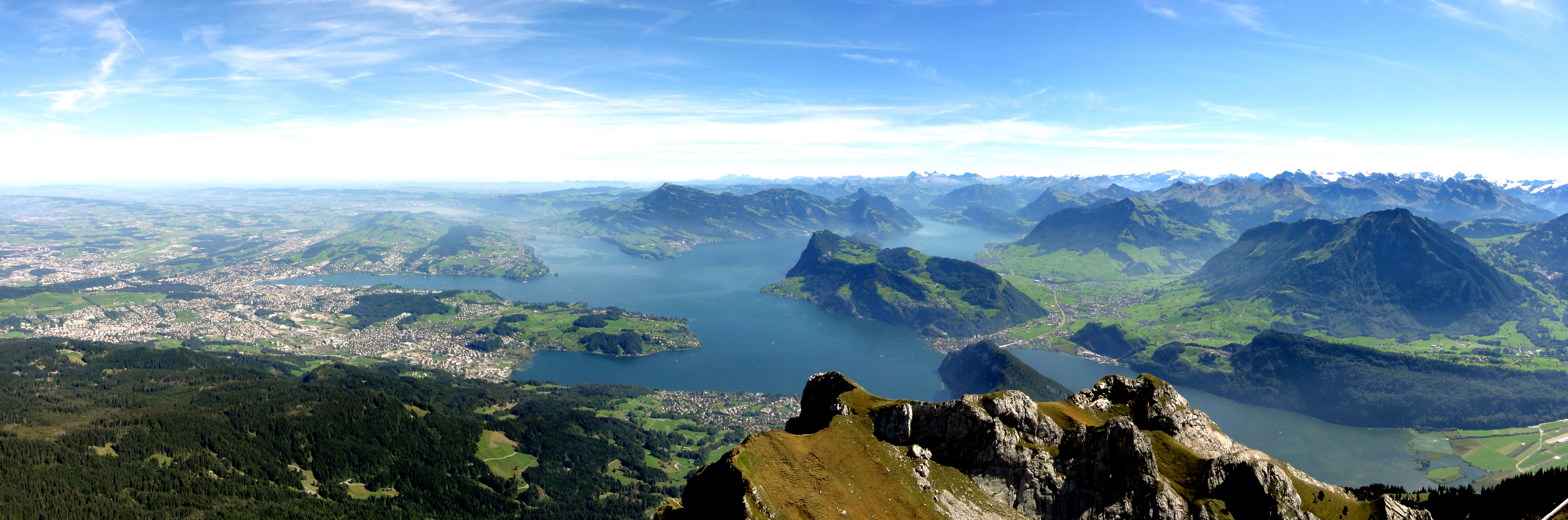
- Kapellbrücke Löwendenkmal Château Gütsch Museggmauer Bahnhof Luzern Lake Lucerne

- Flag Coat of arms
- Location of Lucerne
- Location within Switzerland Location within Canton of Lucerne
- Coordinates: 47°3′N 8°18′E
- Country: Switzerland
- Canton: Lucerne
- District: Lucerne

Government
  - Executive: Stadtrat with 5 members
  - Mayor: Stadtpräsident (list); Beat Züsli SPS/PSS (as of 2020)
  - Parliament: Grosser Stadtrat with 48 members

Area
  - Total: 37.4 km^{2} (14.4 sq mi)
- Elevation (Lake shore): 435 m (1,427 ft)
- Highest elevation (Sonnenberg): 800 m (2,600 ft)
- Lowest elevation (Rotsee): 422 m (1,385 ft)

Population (December 2020)
  - Total: 82,620
  - Density: 2,210/km^{2} (5,720/sq mi)
- Demonym: German: Luzerner(in)
- Time zone: UTC+01:00 (CET)
  - Summer (DST): UTC+02:00 (CEST)
- Postal code: 6000
- SFOS number: 1061
- ISO 3166 code: CH-LU
- Localities: Luzern, Littau
- Surrounded by: Adligenswil, Ebikon, Emmen, Horw, Kriens, Malters, Meggen, Neuenkirch
- Website: www.stadtluzern.ch

Lucerne (English: /luːˈsɜːrn/ loo-SURN) or Luzern (Swiss Standard German: [luˈtsɛrn]) (Note: Other languages: Lucerne German: Lozärn; Italian: Lucerna [luˈtʃɛrna]; Romansh: Lucerna [luˈtsɛrnɐ]; French: Lucerne [lysɛʁn].) is a city and a municipality in central Switzerland, in the German-speaking portion of the country. Lucerne is the capital of the canton of Lucerne and part of the district of the same name. With a population of approximately 86,700 people (as of 2025), Lucerne is the most populous city in Central Switzerland, and a nexus of economics, transport, culture, and media in the region. The city's urban area consists of 19 municipalities and towns with an overall population of about 247,400 people (as of 2024).

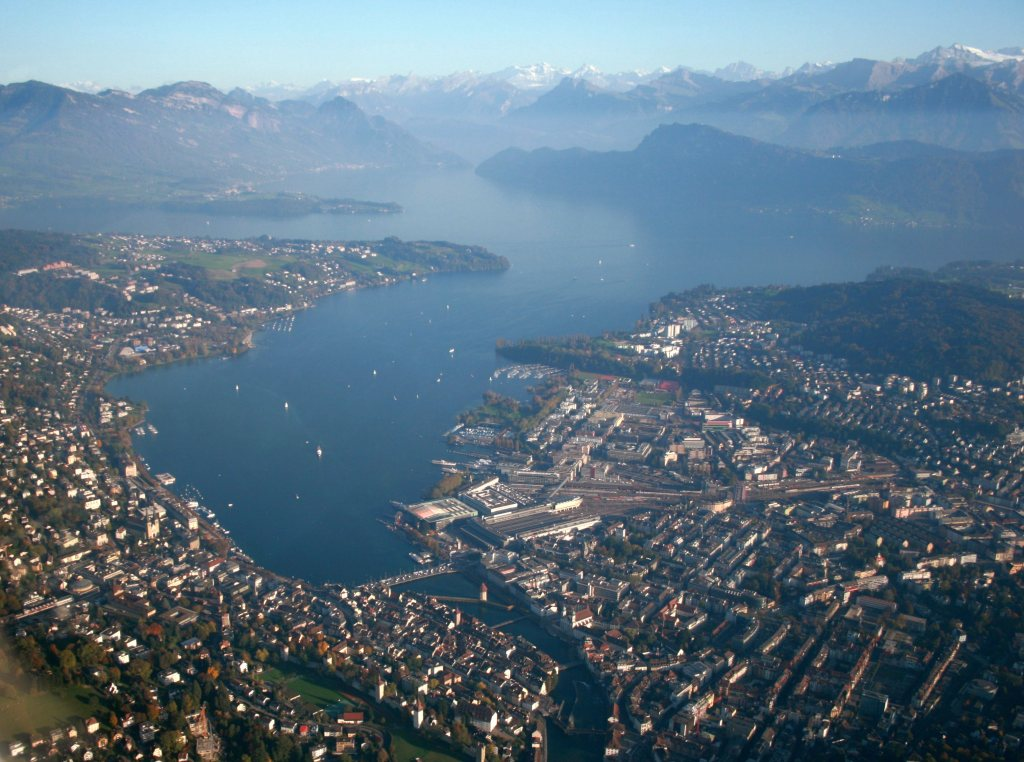
Aerial view of Lake Lucerne

Owing to its location on the shores of Lake Lucerne (German: Vierwaldstättersee) and its outflow, the river Reuss, within sight of the mounts Pilatus and Rigi in the Swiss Alps, Lucerne has long been a destination for tourists. One of the city's landmarks is the Chapel Bridge (German: Kapellbrücke), a wooden bridge first erected in the 14th century.

The official language of Lucerne is German, (Note: The official language in any municipality in German-speaking Switzerland is always German. However, the colloquial Lucerne dialect of Swiss German is not directly mutually intelligible with Standard German. In Swiss governmental contexts, "German" refers to any form of the German language, hence both spoken Swiss German and Swiss Standard German are accepted languages of state. All written and official communications are in Swiss Standard German, while spoken language may vary depending on the circumstance (diglossia).) but the main spoken language is the local variant of the Alemannic Swiss German dialect, Lucerne German.

== History ==
=== Early history and founding (750–1386) ===
After the fall of the Roman Empire beginning in the 6th century, Germanic Alemannic peoples increased their influence on this area of present-day Switzerland.

Around 750 the Benedictine Monastery of St. Leodegar was founded, which was later acquired by Murbach Abbey in Alsace in the middle of the 9th century, and by this time the area had become known as Luciaria.

The origin of the name is uncertain, it is possibly derived from the Latin name of the pike, lucius, thus designating a pike fishing spot in the river Reuss. Derivation from the theonym Lugus has been suggested but is phonetically implausible. In any case, the name was associated by popular etymology with Latin lucerna 'lantern' from an early time.

In 1178 Lucerne acquired its independence from the jurisdiction of Murbach Abbey, and the founding of the city proper probably occurred that same year. The city gained importance as a strategically located gateway for the growing commerce from the Gotthard trade route.

By 1290, Lucerne had become a self-sufficient city of reasonable size with about 3000 inhabitants. About this time King Rudolph I von Habsburg gained authority over the Monastery of St. Leodegar and its lands, including Lucerne. The populace was not content with the increasing Habsburg influence, and Lucerne allied with neighboring towns to seek independence from their rule. Along with Lucerne, the three other forest cantons of Uri, Schwyz and Unterwalden formed the "eternal" Swiss Confederacy, known as the Eidgenossenschaft, on November 7, 1332.

Later the cities of Zurich, Zug and Bern joined the alliance. With the help of these additions, the rule of Austria over the area came to an end. The issue was settled by Lucerne's victory over the Habsburgs in the Battle of Sempach in 1386. For Lucerne this victory ignited an era of expansion. The city shortly granted many rights to itself, rights which had been withheld by the Habsburgs until then. By this time the borders of Lucerne were approximately those of today (excluding Littau).

=== From city to city-state (1386–1520) ===
The city's population of 3000 dropped about 40% due to the Black Plague and several wars around 1350. In 1415 Lucerne gained Reichsfreiheit from Emperor Sigismund and became a strong member of the Swiss confederacy. The city developed its infrastructure, raised taxes, and appointed its own local officials.

In 1419 town records show the first witch trial against a male person.

In 1471, the law was passed to persecute the Romani people of Indian origin.

=== Swiss-Catholic town (1520–1798) ===
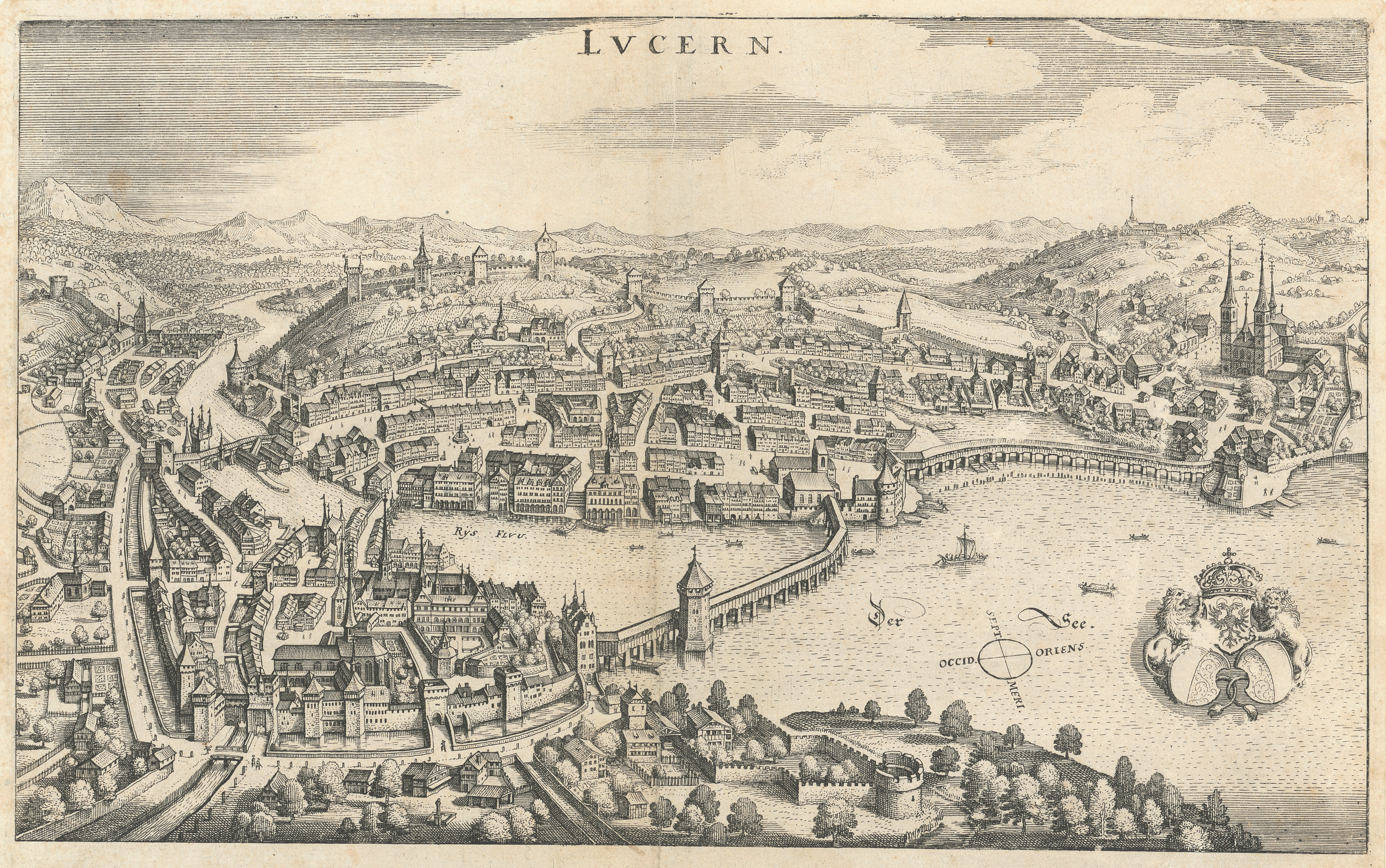
Lucerne in 1642, by Matthäus Merian

Among the growing towns of the confederacy, Lucerne was especially popular in attracting new residents. Remaining predominantly Catholic, Lucerne hosted its own annual passion play from 1453 to 1616, a two-day-long play with 12 hours of performance each day. As the confederacy broke up during the Reformation, after 1520 most nearby cities became Protestant, but Lucerne remained Catholic. After the victory of the Catholics over the Protestants in the Battle at Kappel in 1531, the Catholic towns dominated the confederacy. It was during this period that Jesuits first came to Lucerne in 1567, with considerable backing by Cardinal Carlo Borromeo, Archbishop of Milan. The region, though, was destined to be dominated by Protestant-majority cities such as Zurich, Bern, and Basel, which defeated the Catholic forces in the 1712 Toggenburg War. The former prominent position of Lucerne in the confederacy was lost forever. In the 16th and 17th centuries, wars and epidemics became steadily less frequent, and as a result the population of the country increased notably.

Lucerne was besieged by a peasant army and quickly signed a peace treaty with the rebels in the Swiss peasant war of 1653.

=== Century of revolutions (1798–1914) ===
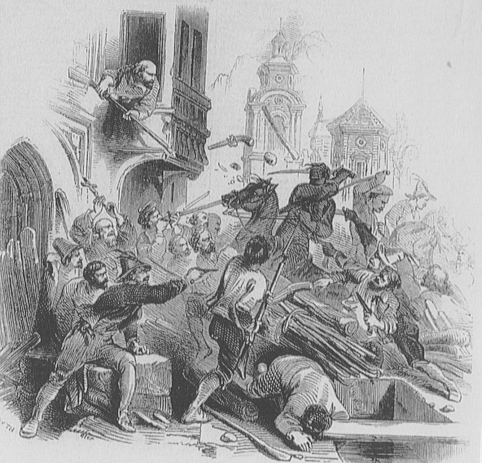
Conflict at Lucerne, Illustrated London News, 1845

Lucerne and Rigi, c. 1820

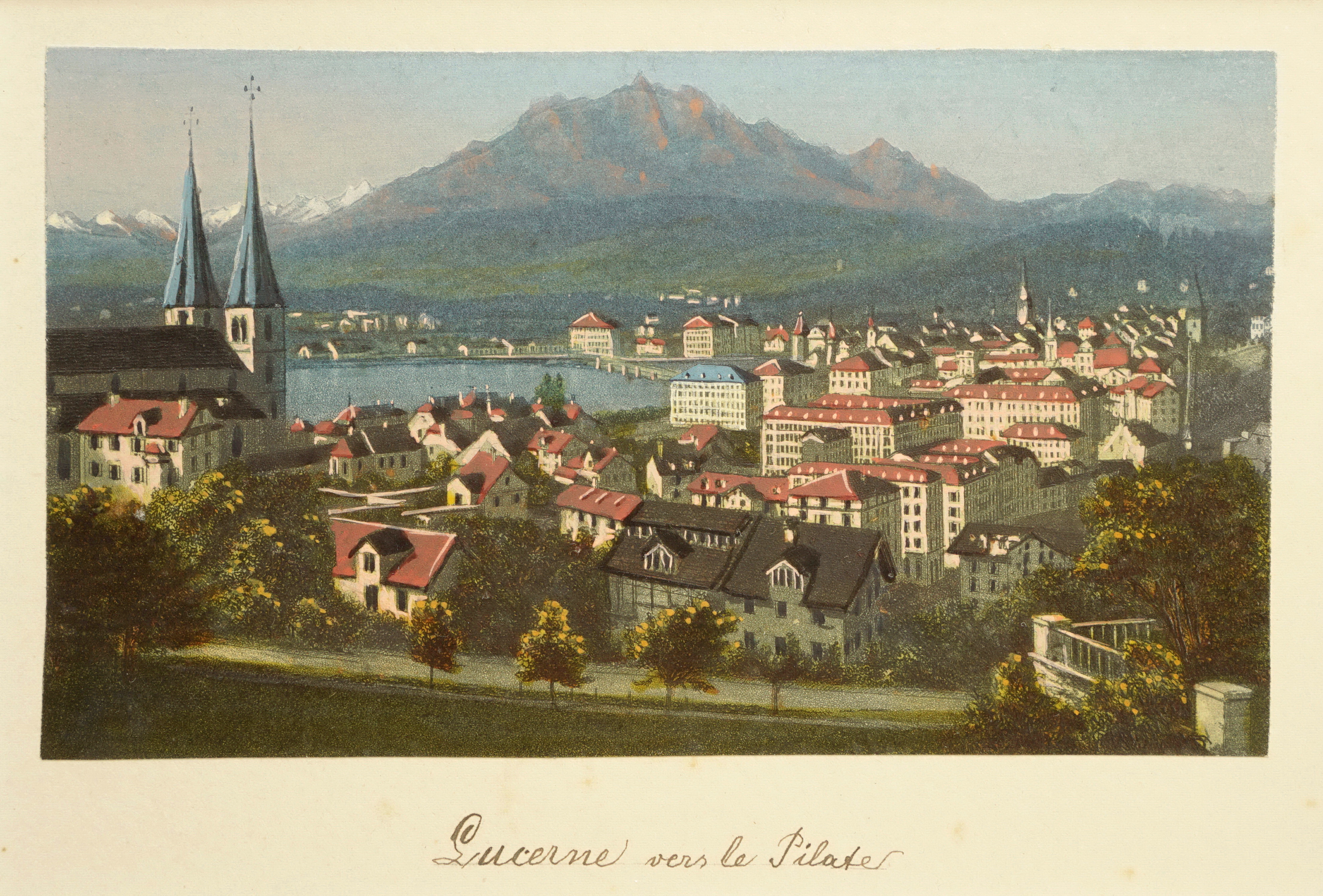
Lucerne and Pilatus, c. 1870. Etching by Heinrich Müller

In 1798, nine years after the beginning of the French Revolution, the French army marched into Switzerland. The Old Swiss Confederacy collapsed and the government became democratic. The Industrial Revolution hit Lucerne rather late, and by 1860 only 1.7% of the population worked in industry, which was about a quarter of the national average at that time. Agriculture, which employed about 40% of the workers, was the main form of economic output in the canton. Nevertheless, industry was attracted to the city from areas around Lucerne. From 1850 to 1913 the population quadrupled and the flow of settlers increased. In 1856 trains first linked the city to Olten and Basel, then Zug and Zurich in 1864, and finally to the south in 1897.

The 1804 play William Tell by Friedrich Schiller did much to establish the reputation of Lucerne and its environs. Schiller himself had not been to Lucerne but was inspired to write it by his wife Lotte and his friend Johann Wolfgang von Goethe, who had both visited the city and its surrounding canton. Goethe had lodged in the Hirschenplatz on his route to Italy in 1779.

It was during the latter part of the 19th century that Lucerne became a popular destination to which artists, royalty, and others could escape. The German composer Richard Wagner established a residence at Tribschen in 1866, where he lived and worked. The city was then boosted by a visit by Queen Victoria in 1868, during which she went sightseeing at the Kapellbrücke and the Lion Monument and relished speaking with local people in her native German.

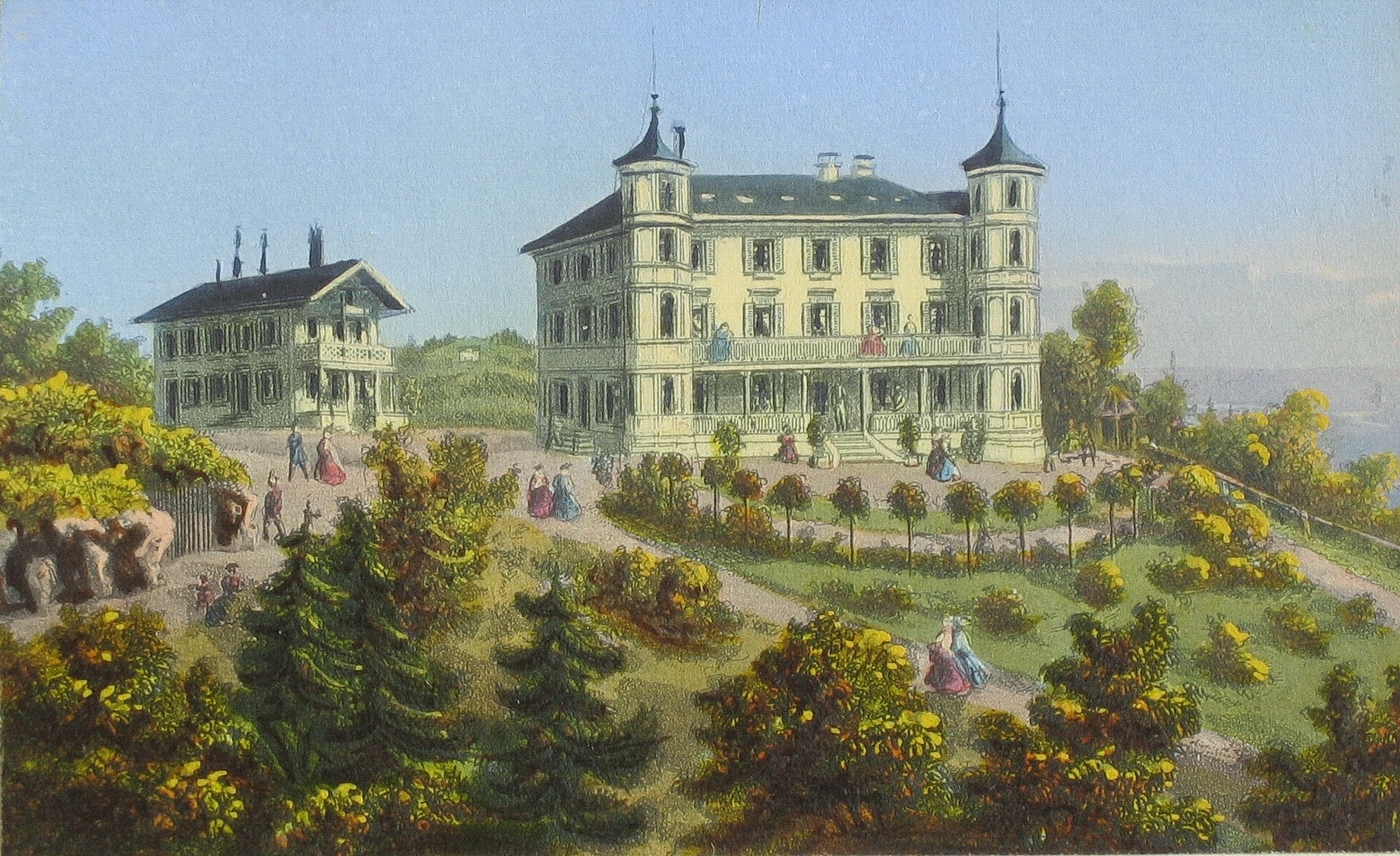
Pension Wallis (close to Château Gütsch), where Queen Victoria stayed in 1868

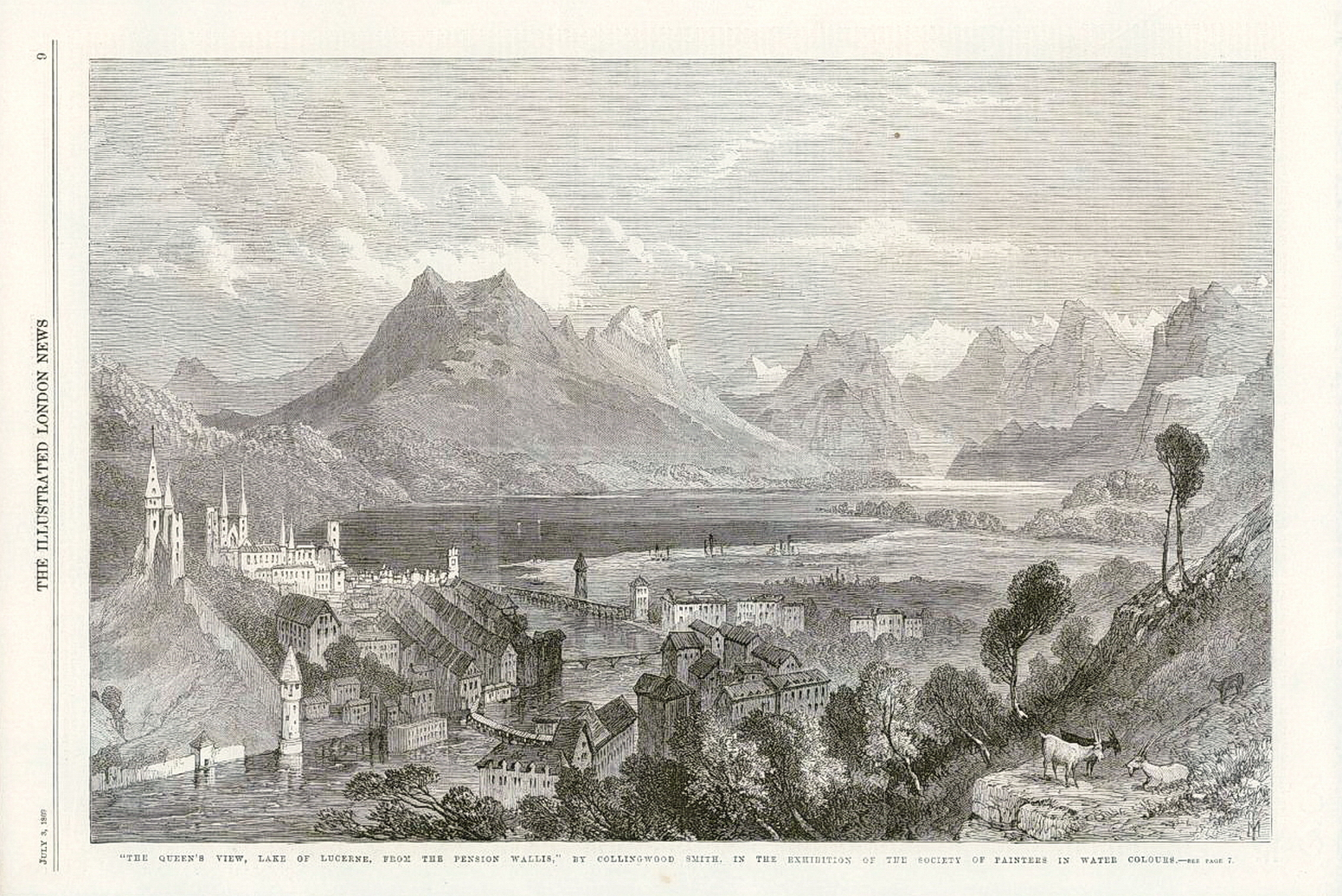
"The Queen's View, Lake of Lucerne, from the Pension Wallis by Collingwood Smith", from The Illustrated London News, 1869

The American writer Mark Twain further popularised the city and its environs in his travel writings after visiting in 1878 and 1897. In 1892 Swiss poet and future Nobel laureate Carl Spitteler also established himself in Lucerne, living there until his death in 1924.

Lucerne's status as a fashionable destination led to it becoming one of the first centres of modern-style tourism. Some of the city's most recognisable buildings are hotels from this period, such as the Schweizerhof Hotel (1845), Grand Hotel National (1870), and Château Gütsch (1879). It was at the National where Swiss hotelier César Ritz would establish himself as manager between 1878 and 1888.

=== 1993 great fire ===
Aerial view by Walter Mittelholzer (1919)

In August 1993, the Kapellbrücke, in the centre of the city, suffered from a great fire which destroyed two thirds of its interior paintings. The bridge was subsequently reconstructed and reopened to the public in April 1994, after a total of CHF 3.4 million was spent on its repair.

=== Merge with Littau ===
On June 17, 2007, voters of the city of Lucerne and the adjacent town of Littau agreed to a merger in a simultaneous referendum. This took effect on January 1, 2010. The new city, still called Lucerne, has a population of around 80,000 people, making it the seventh-largest city in Switzerland. The results of this referendum are expected to pave the way for negotiations with other nearby cities and towns in an effort to create a unified city-region, based on the results of a study.

== Geography and climate ==
=== Topography ===
Lucerne is located at the outfall of Lake Lucerne into the river Reuss, which flows from south-east to north-west. The city occupies both banks of the river and the lowest reach of the lake, with the city centre straddling the river immediately downstream of the outfall. The city's suburbs climb the hills to the north-east and south-west, and stretch out along the river and lake banks, whilst the recently added area of Littau is to the north-west.

Besides this contiguous city area, the municipality also includes an exclave on the south shore of Lake Lucerne some 8 kilometres (5.0 mi) away, comprising the northern slopes of the Bürgenstock. This section of the municipality is entirely surrounded by the lake and by land of the canton of Nidwalden. It does not contain any significant settlements, but the summit of the Bürgenstock is the highest point of the municipality.

The municipality has an area of 29.1 square kilometers (11.2 sq mi). Of this area and as of 2009, 28.0% is used for agricultural purposes, while 22.3% is forested. Of the rest of the land, 47.6% is settled (buildings or roads) and the remainder (2.1%) is non-productive (rivers, glaciers or mountains).

=== Climate ===
Between 1961 and 1990 Lucerne had an average of 138.1 days of rain per year and on average received 1,171 mm (46.1 in) of precipitation. The wettest month was June during which time Lucerne received an average of 153 mm (6.0 in) of rainfall. During this month there was rainfall for an average of 14.2 days. The driest month of the year was February with an average of 61 mm (2.4 in) of precipitation over 10.2 days. Climate in this area has mild differences between highs and lows, and there is adequate rainfall year-round. The Köppen Climate Classification subtype for this climate is "Cfb" (Marine West Coast Climate/Oceanic climate).

Climate data for Lucerne, elevation 454 m (1,490 ft), (1991–2020 normals, extremes 1927–present)
| Month | Jan | Feb | Mar | Apr | May | Jun | Jul | Aug | Sep | Oct | Nov | Dec | Year |
|---|---|---|---|---|---|---|---|---|---|---|---|---|---|
| Record high °C (°F) | 19.5 (67.1) | 19.9 (67.8) | 26.2 (79.2) | 29.1 (84.4) | 33.4 (92.1) | 35.3 (95.5) | 37.2 (99.0) | 35.8 (96.4) | 31.6 (88.9) | 27.0 (80.6) | 22.5 (72.5) | 18.6 (65.5) | 37.2 (99.0) |
| Mean daily maximum °C (°F) | 4.0 (39.2) | 5.8 (42.4) | 10.9 (51.6) | 15.3 (59.5) | 19.4 (66.9) | 22.9 (73.2) | 24.9 (76.8) | 24.3 (75.7) | 19.6 (67.3) | 14.3 (57.7) | 8.2 (46.8) | 4.5 (40.1) | 14.5 (58.1) |
| Daily mean °C (°F) | 1.1 (34.0) | 1.9 (35.4) | 6.0 (42.8) | 9.9 (49.8) | 14.1 (57.4) | 17.6 (63.7) | 19.5 (67.1) | 18.9 (66.0) | 14.8 (58.6) | 10.3 (50.5) | 5.1 (41.2) | 1.9 (35.4) | 10.1 (50.2) |
| Mean daily minimum °C (°F) | −1.6 (29.1) | −1.7 (28.9) | 1.5 (34.7) | 4.8 (40.6) | 9.1 (48.4) | 12.8 (55.0) | 14.6 (58.3) | 14.4 (57.9) | 10.8 (51.4) | 6.9 (44.4) | 2.2 (36.0) | −0.8 (30.6) | 6.1 (43.0) |
| Record low °C (°F) | −20.3 (−4.5) | −26.0 (−14.8) | −14.5 (5.9) | −7.0 (19.4) | −2.0 (28.4) | 0.0 (32.0) | 4.2 (39.6) | 2.1 (35.8) | 0.5 (32.9) | −5.0 (23.0) | −10.0 (14.0) | −19.0 (−2.2) | −26.0 (−14.8) |
| Average precipitation mm (inches) | 55.8 (2.20) | 61.3 (2.41) | 75.4 (2.97) | 96.5 (3.80) | 148.7 (5.85) | 164.5 (6.48) | 165.5 (6.52) | 170.0 (6.69) | 109.2 (4.30) | 88.2 (3.47) | 77.9 (3.07) | 78.4 (3.09) | 1,291.4 (50.84) |
| Average snowfall cm (inches) | 11.0 (4.3) | 14.1 (5.6) | 4.5 (1.8) | 0.9 (0.4) | 0.0 (0.0) | 0.0 (0.0) | 0.0 (0.0) | 0.0 (0.0) | 0.0 (0.0) | 0.4 (0.2) | 3.2 (1.3) | 12.8 (5.0) | 46.9 (18.5) |
| Average precipitation days (≥ 1.0 mm) | 9.7 | 8.7 | 11.0 | 11.2 | 13.1 | 13.5 | 12.7 | 12.7 | 10.2 | 10.0 | 9.5 | 10.5 | 132.8 |
| Average snowy days (≥ 1.0 cm) | 2.8 | 3.0 | 1.1 | 0.5 | 0.0 | 0.0 | 0.0 | 0.0 | 0.0 | 0.0 | 0.8 | 2.7 | 10.9 |
| Average relative humidity (%) | 83 | 78 | 72 | 68 | 71 | 72 | 71 | 75 | 80 | 84 | 85 | 85 | 77 |
| Mean monthly sunshine hours | 50.8 | 79.9 | 133.3 | 161.5 | 172.7 | 186.9 | 208.9 | 198.4 | 145.8 | 99.4 | 53.4 | 39.0 | 1,530 |
| Percentage possible sunshine | 23 | 32 | 39 | 43 | 40 | 42 | 47 | 49 | 42 | 33 | 23 | 19 | 38 |
Source 1: NOAA
Source 2: MeteoSwiss Infoclimat (extremes)

== Politics ==
=== Government ===
Logo of the municipality of Lucerne

The City Council (Stadtrat) constitutes the executive government of the city of Lucerne and operates as a collegiate authority. It is composed of five councilors (German: Stadtrat/-rätin), each presiding over a directorate (Direktion) comprising several departments and bureaus. The president of the executive department acts as mayor (Stadtpräsident). In the mandate period (Legislatur) September 2024 – August 2028 the City Council is presided by Stadtpräsident Beat Züsli. Departmental tasks, coordination measures and implementation of laws decreed by the Grand City Council are carried by the City Council. The regular election of the City Council by any inhabitant valid to vote is held every four years. Any resident of Lucerne allowed to vote can be elected as a member of the City Council. The delegates are selected by means of a system of Majorz. The mayor is elected as such as well by public election while the heads of the other directorates are assigned by the collegiate.

As of 1 September 2024, Luzern's City Council is made up of one representative of the SP (Social Democratic Party, who is also the mayor) and one of the GPS (Green Party), both elected in first round, and another one of the SP, and one each of Centre (Centre Party, former CVP) and FDP (FDP.The Liberals), all elected on second round. This gives the left parties a majority. The last regular election were held on 28 April/8 June 2024. Except for the mayor, all other councilors are newly electeds.

The City Council (Stadtrat) of Luzern 2024–2028
| City Councilor (Stadtrat/-rätin) | Party | Head of Directorate (Direktion, since) of | elected since |
|---|---|---|---|
| Beat Züsli (Note: Mayor (Stadtpräsident)) | SP | Education and Mayor's Office (Bildungsdirektion/Präsidiales, 2016) | 2016 |
| Korintha Bärtsch | GPS | Building and Civil Engineering (Baudirektion, 2024) | 2024 |
| Franziska Bitzi (Note: Vice President (Vizepräsidentin)) | Centre | Finances (Finanzdirektion, 2024) | 2024 |
| Melanie Setz | SP | Social Services and Security (Sozial- und Sicherheitsdirektion, 2024)) | 2024 |
| Marco Baumann | FDP | Environment and Transport (Umwelt- und Verkehrsdirektion, 2024) | 2024 |

Michèle Bucher (FDP) is Town Chronicler (Stadtschreiberin) since 2020.

=== Parliament ===
The Grosse Stadtrat of Luzern for the mandate period of 2024-2028
1. JUSO (2.10%)
2. jg (2.10%)
3. SP (27.1%)
4. GPS (16.7%)
5. glp (8.30%)
6. Centre (14.6%)
7. FDP (16.7%)
8. SVP (12.5%)

The Grand City Council (Grosser Stadtrat) holds legislative power. It is made up of 48 members, with elections held every four years. The Grand City Council decrees regulations and by-laws that are executed by the City Council and the administration. The delegates are selected by means of a system of proportional representation.

The sessions of the Grand City Council are public. Unlike members of the City Council, members of the Grand City Council are not politicians by profession, and they are paid a fee based on their attendance. Any resident of Luzern allowed to vote can be elected as a member of the Grand City Council. The parliament holds its meetings in the Rathaus (Town Hall) am Kornmarkt.

The last regular election of the Grand City Council was held on 28 April 2024 for the mandate period (German: Legislatur) from September 2024 to August 2028. Currently the Grand City Council consist of 13 members of the Social Democratic Party (SP/PS) (+-0) and one of its junior section, the JUSO, 8 (+2) Green Party (GPS/PES) and one of its junior section, the jg of Luzern, 8 (-1) The Liberals (FDP/PLR), 7 (+-0) Centre Party (former CVP/PDC), 6 (-1) Swiss People's Party (SVP/UDC), and 4 (+-0) Green Liberal Party (GLP/PVL).

=== National elections ===
==== National Council ====
In the 2023 federal election for the Swiss National Council the most popular party was the SP which received 28.7% (+3.7) of the vote. The next five most popular parties were the Centre (former CVP) (17.2%, +3.1), the Green Party (15.6%, -5.1), the SVP (14.7%, -0.3), FDP (12.7%, -0.2), the glp (9.0%, -1.5). The voter turnout was 51.3%.

In the 2019 federal election for the Swiss National Council the most popular party was the SP which received 25.0% (-0.7) of the vote. The next five most popular parties were the Green Party (20.8%, +7.4), the SVP (15.0%, -4.6), the CVP (14.1%, 0), FDP (13.0%, -2.5), the glp (10.5%, +1.8). In the federal election a total of 25,836 votes were cast, and the voter turnout was 49.5%.

In the 2015 election for the Swiss National Council the most popular party was the SP which received 25.8% of the vote. The next five most popular parties were the SVP (19.5%), the FDP (15.4%), the CVP (14.1%), the GPS (13.3%), and the GLP (8.9%). In the federal election, a total of 26,521 voters were cast, and the voter turnout was 49.48%.

=== International relations ===
==== Twin towns ====
Lucerne is twinned with the following towns:

- Bournemouth, United Kingdom (1981)
- Chicago, Illinois, United States (1999)
- Guebwiller / Murbach, France (1978)
- Olomouc, Czech Republic (1994)
- Potsdam, Germany (2002)

== Demographics ==
Largest groups of foreign residents 2021
| Nationality | Numbers | % of total (% of foreigners) |
|---|---|---|
| Germany | 3,772 | 4.56 (18.39) |
| Italy | 2,225 | 2.69 (10.85) |
| Portugal | 1,376 | 1.66 (6.71) |
| Eritrea | 866 | 1.05 (4.22) |
| Serbia | 843 | 1.02 (4.11) |
| Kosovo | 783 | 0.95 (3.82) |
| Spain | 713 | 0.86 (3.48) |
| Sri Lanka | 629 | 0.76 (3.07) |
| Turkey | 499 | 0.60 (2.43) |
| Croatia | 428 | 0.52 (2.09) |
| North Macedonia | 365 | 0.44 (1.78) |
| Bosnia and Herzegovina | 323 | 0.39 (1.57) |

Historical population
| Year | Pop. | ±% |
|---|---|---|
| 1850 | 11,382 | — |
| 1860 | 13,166 | +15.7% |
| 1870 | 16,450 | +24.9% |
| 1880 | 20,419 | +24.1% |
| 1888 | 23,607 | +15.6% |
| 1900 | 32,954 | +39.6% |
| 1910 | 43,611 | +32.3% |
| 1920 | 48,394 | +11.0% |
| 1930 | 52,102 | +7.7% |
| 1941 | 59,847 | +14.9% |
| 1950 | 66,170 | +10.6% |
| 1960 | 76,148 | +15.1% |
| 1970 | 83,374 | +9.5% |
| 1980 | 78,274 | −6.1% |
| 1990 | 76,466 | −2.3% |
| 2000 | 75,425 | −1.4% |
| 2010 | 77,491 | +2.7% |
| 2020 | 82,620 | +6.6% |

Lucerne has a population (as of 31 December 2021) of 82,771 As of 2021, 20,508 or 24.78% of the population was made up of foreign nationals, of which 18.22% are from Europe, 3.63% from Asia, 1.85% from Africa and 0.97% from America. Over the last 10 years the population has grown at a rate of 1.2%.

Most of the population (as of 2020) speak German (83.26%), with English with 7.45%, as well as Italian (5.06%) and Serbo-Croatian (3.80%) being respectively second, third and fourth most common first languages reported. Following, there are Portuguese (2.81%), Spanish (2.53%), Albanian (2.25%) and French (2.11%) language speakers.

The age distribution in Lucerne is (as of 2013); 12,916 people or 15.7% of the population is 0–19 years old. 26,381 people or 33.8% are 20–39 years old, and 25,863 people or 32.1% are 40–64 years old. The senior population distribution is 10,530 people or 13.1% are 65–79 years old, 4,208 or 5.2% are 80–89 years old and 900 people or 1.1% of the population are 90+ years old.

In Lucerne about 73.6% of the population (between age 25–64) have completed either non-mandatory upper secondary education or additional higher education (either university or a Fachhochschule).

As of 2000 there are 30,586 households, of which 15,452 households (or about 50.5%) contain only a single individual. 853 or about 2.8% are large households, with at least five members. As of 2000 there were 5,707 inhabited buildings in the municipality, of which 4,050 were built only as housing, and 1,657 were mixed use buildings. There were 1,152 single family homes, 348 double family homes, and 2,550 multi-family homes in the municipality. Most homes were either two (787) or three (1,468) story structures. There were only 74 single story buildings and 1,721 four or more story buildings.

=== Religion ===
The city developed around Sankt Leodegar Abbey, founded in AD 840, and has remained strongly Roman Catholic into the 21st century. By 1850, 96.9% of the population was Catholic, in 1900 it was 81.9% and in 1950 it was still 72.3%. In the 2000 census the religious membership of Lucerne was: 35,682 (60%) Roman Catholic, 9,227 (15.5%) Protestant, with an additional 1,979 (3.33%) who were of some other Christian denominations; 1,824 individuals (3.07% of the population) Muslim; 196 individuals (0.33% of the population) Jewish. Of the remainder, 1,073 (1.8%) individuals were another religion; 6,310 (10.61%) stated they do not belong to any organized religion; and 3,205 (5.39%) did not answer the question.

== Economy ==
As of 2012, there were a total of 77,641 people employed in the municipality. Of these, a total of 166 people worked in 53 businesses in the primary economic sector. The secondary sector employed 7,326 workers in 666 separate businesses. Finally, the tertiary sector provided 70,149 jobs in 6,929 businesses. In 2013 a total of 11.0% of the population received social assistance. As of 2000 51.7% of the population of the municipality were employed in some capacity. At the same time, women made up 47.9% of the workforce.

Lucerne is home to a number of major Swiss companies, including AlpTransit Gotthard rail link, Schindler Group, Chronoswiss, Emmi, and the Luzerner Kantonalbank. Suva, one of Switzerland's oldest accident insurance companies, is also based in Lucerne, as is the University of Lucerne, the youngest of Switzerland's traditional universities. An international company is the EF Education First. Thanks to its continuous tax-cutting policies, Lucerne has become Switzerland's most business-friendly canton. As of 2012 Lucerne offers Switzerland's lowest corporate tax rate at cantonal level.

One of the first export oriented branches was the production of scythes from the 14th century onwards. Lucerne imported iron and steel and the cities blacksmiths produced scythes which were exported to western Switzerland and northern Italy. The workshops of the blacksmiths were located in the outskirts of the city due to fire concerns. The workshops at the Krienbach creek included hammers moved by watermills. Furthermore, Lucerne also offers very moderate personal income tax rates. In a recent published study of BAK Basel Economics taxation index 2012, Lucerne made it to the 4th place with an only marginally 2% higher tax rate compared to the top canton in this comparison.

== Sights ==
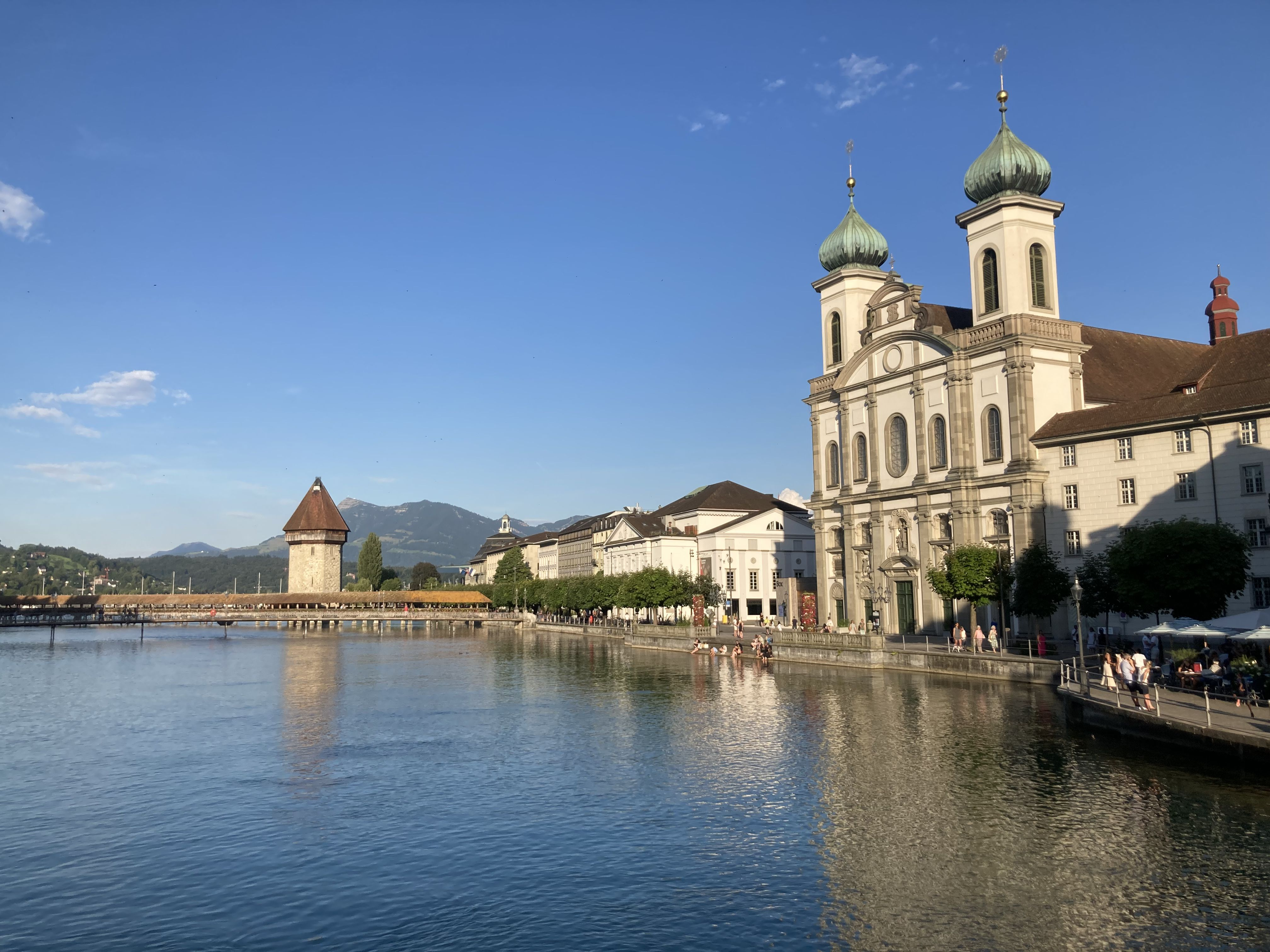
The Chapel Bridge and Jesuit Church St. Francis Xavier on the Reuss

Since the city straddles the Reuss where it drains the lake, it has a number of bridges. These include the Chapel Bridge (Kapellbrücke), a 204 m (669 ft) long wooden covered bridge originally built in 1333, the oldest covered bridge in Europe, although much of it had to be replaced after a fire on 18 August 1993, allegedly caused by a discarded cigarette. Partway across, the bridge runs by the octagonal Water Tower (Wasserturm), a fortification from the 13th century. Inside the bridge are a series of paintings from the 17th century depicting events from Lucerne's history.

Downriver, between the Kasernenplatz and the Mühlenplatz, the Spreuer Bridge (Spreuerbrücke or Mühlenbrücke, Mill Bridge) zigzags across the Reuss. Constructed in 1408, it features a series of medieval-style 17th century plague paintings by Kaspar Meglinger (de) titled Dance of Death (Totentanzzyklus). The bridge has a small chapel in the middle that was added in 1568.

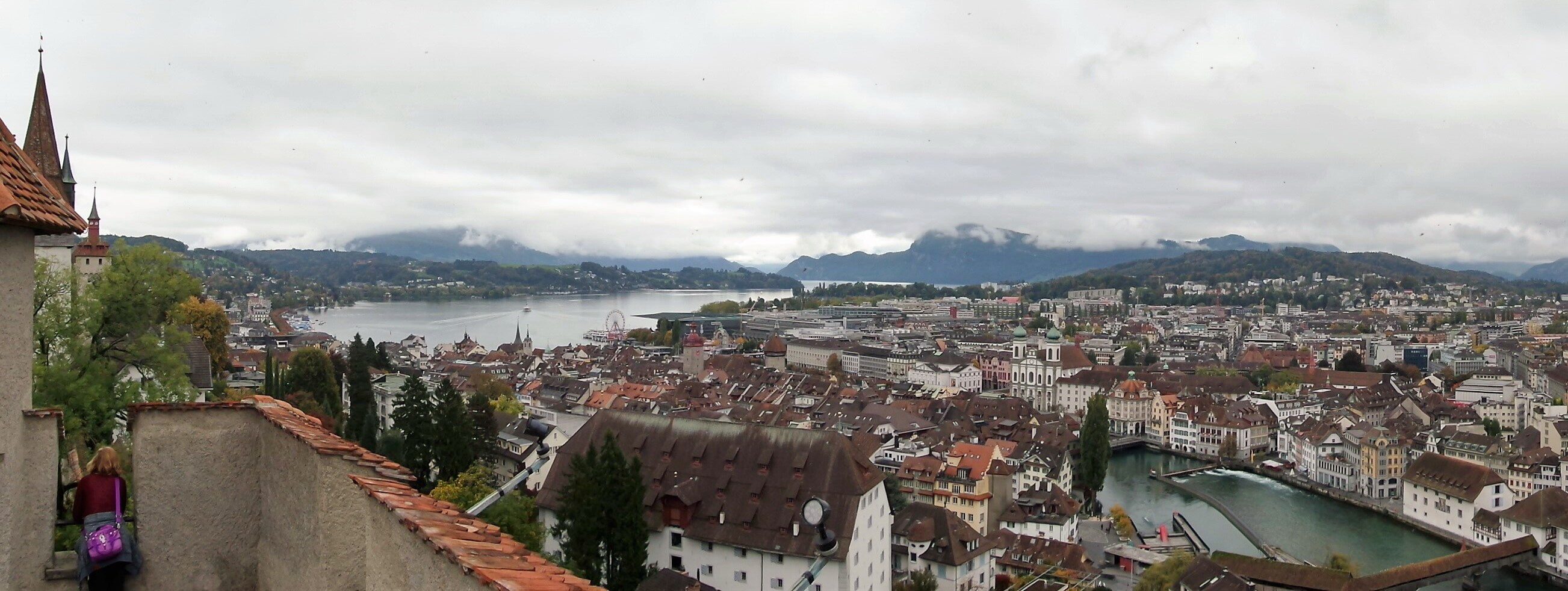
View of the old town centre and Lake Lucerne from one of the watch towers ("Männliturm")

Old Town Lucerne is mainly located just north of the Reuss, and still has several fine half-timber structures with painted fronts. Remnants of the old town walls exist on the hill above Lucerne, complete with eight tall watch towers. An additional gated tower sits at the base of the hill on the banks of the Reuss.

The twin needle towers of the Church of St. Leodegar, which was named after the city's patron saint, sit on a small hill just above the lake front. Originally built in 735, the present structure was erected in 1633 in the late Renaissance style. However, the towers are surviving remnants of an earlier structure. The interior is richly decorated. The church is popularly called the Hofkirche (in German) and is known locally as the Hofchile (in Swiss-German).

Bertel Thorvaldsen's carving of a dying lion (the Lion Monument, or Löwendenkmal) is found in a small park just off the Löwenplatz. The carving commemorates the hundreds of Swiss Guards who were massacred in 1792 during the French Revolution, when an armed mob stormed the Tuileries Palace in Paris.

The Swiss Museum of Transport is a large and comprehensive museum exhibiting all forms of transport, including locomotives, automobiles, ships, and aircraft. It is to be found beside the lake in the northern-eastern section of the city.

The Culture and Convention Center (KKL) beside the lake in the center of the city was designed by Jean Nouvel. The center has one of the world's leading concert halls, with acoustics by Russell Johnson.

The Richard Wagner Museum is found on the lake at Tribschen and is dedicated to the composer Richard Wagner. Wagner lived in Lucerne from 1866 to 1872 and his former villa now hosts the museum dedicated to him.

Lucerne also has a Nature Museum.

== Culture and events ==
=== Culture ===
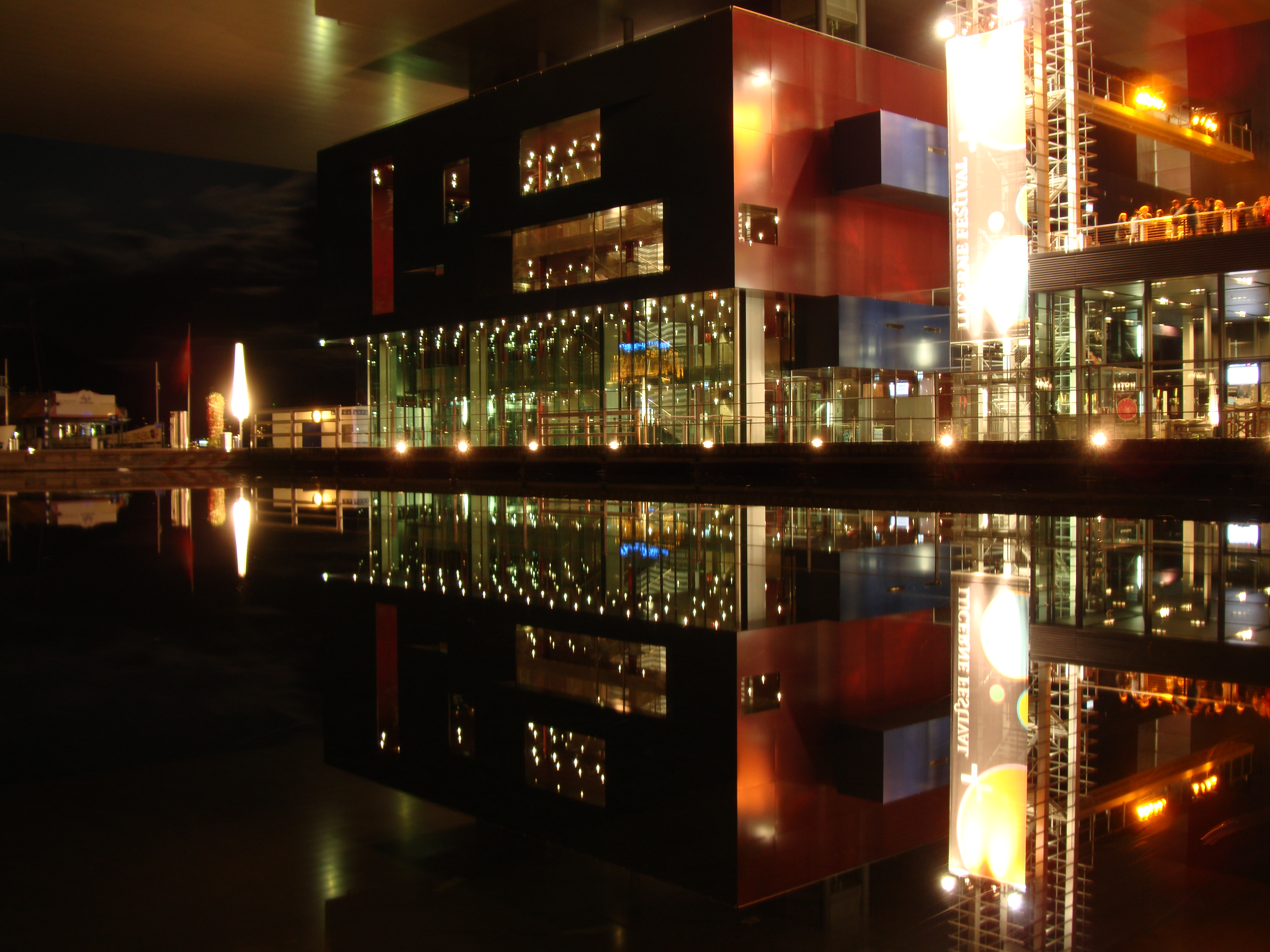
The Lucerne Culture and Congress Centre at night

Since plans for the new culture and convention centre arose in the late 1980s, Lucerne has found a balance between the so-called established culture and alternative culture. A consensus was reached that culminated in a culture compromise (Kulturkompromiss). The established culture comprises the Lucerne Culture and Congress Centre (KKL), the city theater (Luzerner Theater) and, in a broader sense, smaller establishments such as the Kleintheater, founded by comedian Emil Steinberger, a Lucerne native, or Stadtkeller, a music restaurant in the city's old town. KKL houses a concert hall as well as the Museum of Art Lucerne (Kunstmuseum Luzern).

Alternative culture took place mostly on the premises of a former tube factory, which became known as Boa. Other localities for alternative culture have since emerged in the same inner city area as Boa. Initially, Boa staged various plays, but concerts became more and more common; this new use of the building clashed with the development of apartment buildings on nearby lots of land. Due to possible noise pollution, Boa was closed and a replacement in a less heavily inhabited area is currently under construction. Critics claimed though that the new establishment would not meet the requirements for an alternative culture.

Südpol is a center for performing arts in Lucerne presenting music-, dance- and theatre-events. The house at the foot of Pilatus opened in November 2008.

Lucerne is home to the Luzerner Sinfonieorchester, a category A symphonic orchestra, and to the 21st Century Symphony Orchestra, and they both hold most of their performances in the Lucerne Culture and Congress Centre.

Another art museum in Lucerne is the Rosengart Collection Museum.

=== Lucerne in art ===
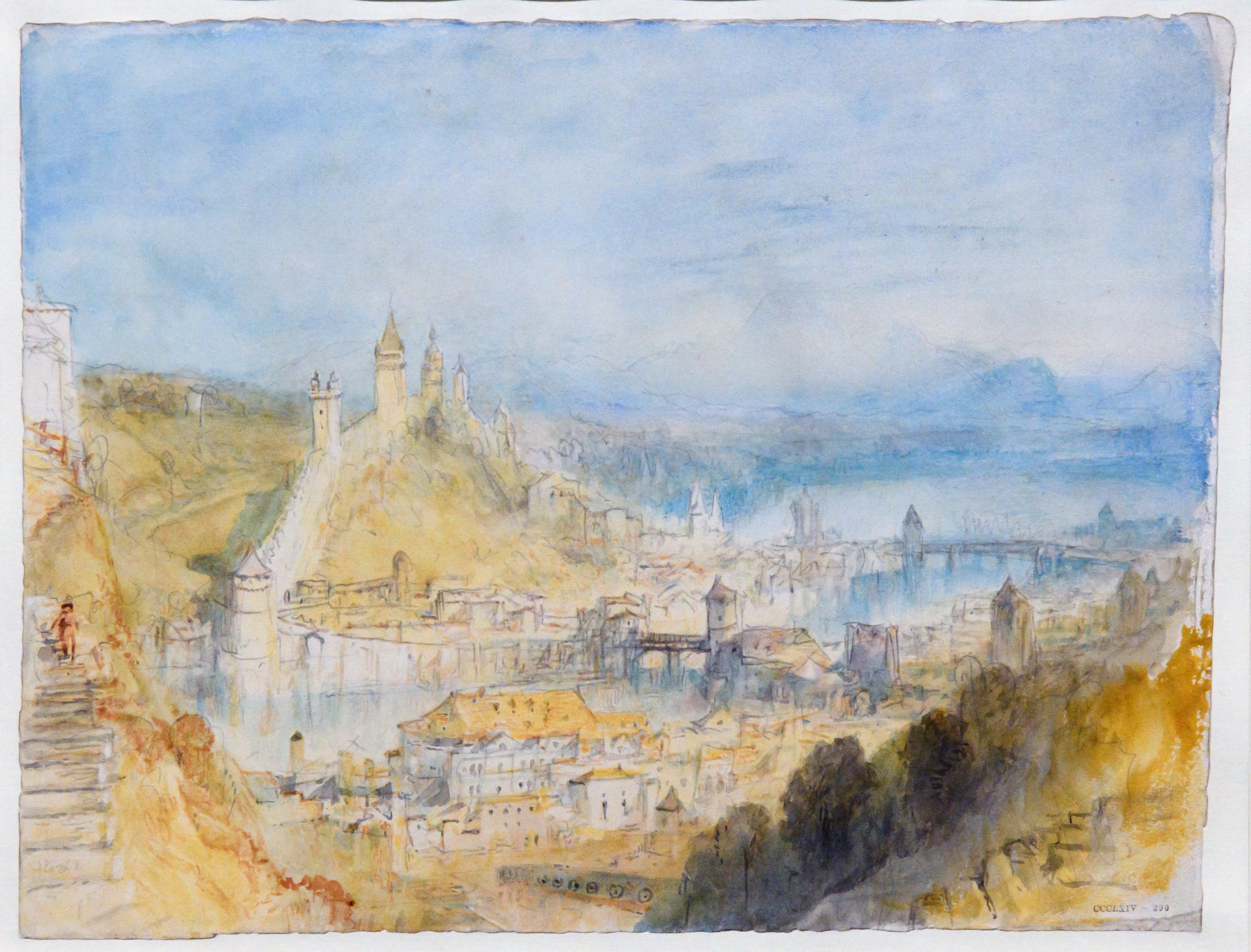
Lucerne from the Walls
William Turner, 1841
Tate Britain

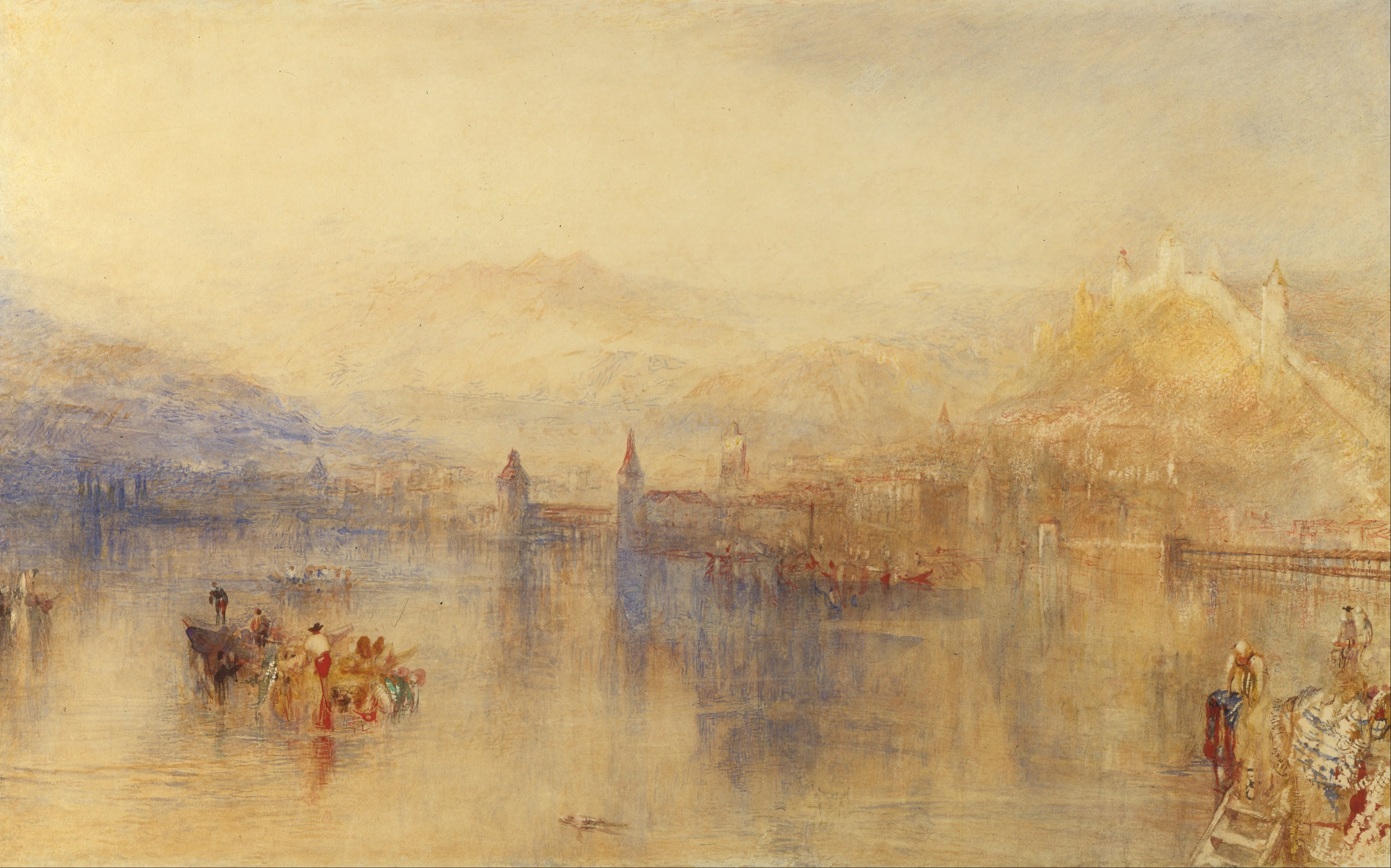
Lucerne from the Lake
William Turner, 1845
Morgan Library, New York City

=== Events ===
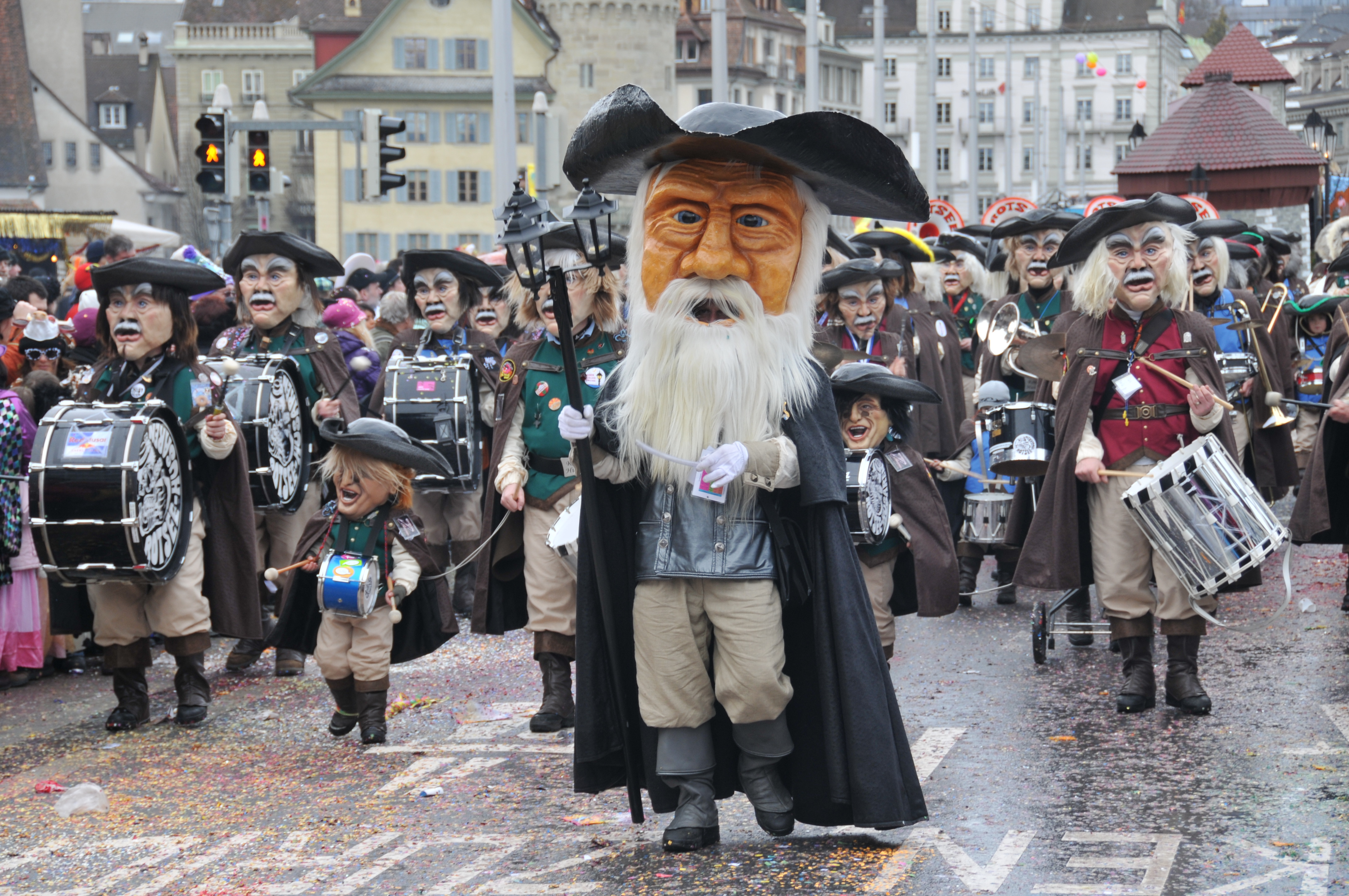
Lucerne Fasnacht

Every year, towards the end of winter, Fasnacht (Carnival) breaks out in the streets, alleyways and squares of the old town. Strange characters in fantastic masks and costumes make their way through the alleyways, while Guggenmusiken (carnival bands) blow their instruments in joyful cacophony and thousands of bizarrely clad people sing and dance away the winter. Lucerne Fasnacht, based on religious, Catholic backgrounds, starts every year on the Thursday before Aschermittwoch (Ash Wednesday) at 5 am with a detonation called Urknall (Big Bang), the signal to begin the Tagwache (wake-up procession). There are big parades in the afternoon on Schmotzige Donnerstag (literally: Lardy Thursday) and the following Monday, called Güdismontag (literally: Paunch Monday), which attract tens of thousands of people. Lucerne's Carnival ends on Güdisdienstag (literally: Paunch Tuesday) evening with the Monstercorso, a parade of Guggenmusiken, lights and lanterns with even a larger audience. Recently a fourth Fasnacht day has been introduced on the Saturday between the other Fasnacht days, the Rüüdige Samstag while mainly several indoor balls take place. From dusk till dawn on the evenings of Schmotzige Donnerstag, Güdismontag, and after the Monstercorso many bands wander through the historical part of the city playing typical Fasnacht tunes. Until midnight, the historical part of the city usually is packed with people participating. A large part of the audience are also dressed up in costumes, even a majority in the evenings.

The city hosts various renowned festivals throughout the year. The Lucerne Festival for classical music takes place in the summer. Its orchestra, the Lucerne Festival Orchestra, is hand-picked from some of the finest instrumentalists in the world. In June yearly the pop music festival B-Sides takes place in Lucerne. It focuses on international acts in alternative music, indie rock, experimental rock and other cutting edge and left field artistic musical genres. In July, the Blue Balls Festival brings jazz, blues and punk music to the lake promenade and halls of the Culture and Convention Center. The Lucerne Blues Festival is another musical festival which usually takes place in November. Since spring 2004, Lucerne has hosted the Festival Rose d'Or for television entertainment. And in April, the well-established comics festival Fumetto attracts an international audience.

Being the cultural center of a rather rural region, Lucerne regularly holds different folklore festivals, such as Lucerne Cheese Festival, held annually. In 2004, Lucerne was the focus of Swiss Wrestling fans when it had hosted the Swiss Wrestling and Alpine festival (Eidgenössisches Schwing- und Älplerfest), which takes place every three years in a different location. A national music festival (Eidgenössiches Musikfest) attracted marching bands from all parts of Switzerland in 2006. In summer 2008, the yodelling festival (Eidgenössisches Jodlerfest) had a similar impact.

The 2021 Winter Universiade was planned to be hosted by Lucerne, but was cancelled due to the COVID-19 pandemic.

== Transport ==
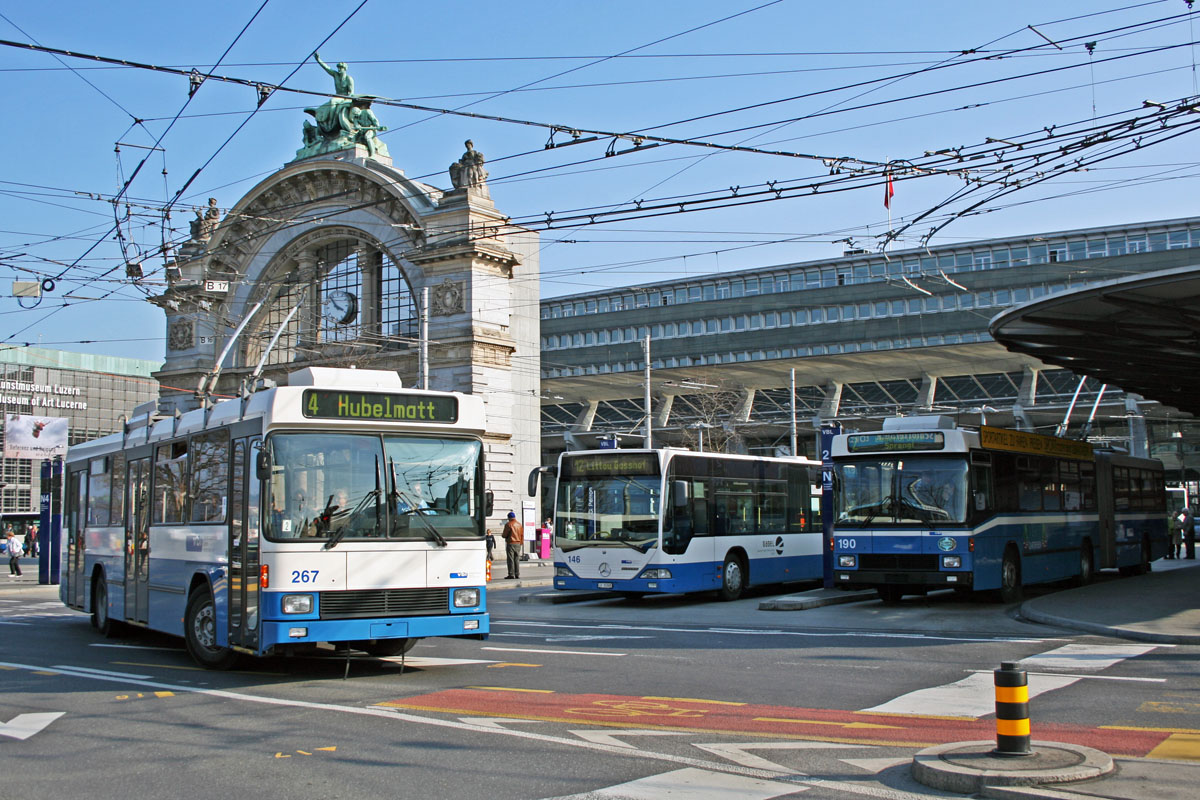
Lucerne bus station Luzern Bahnhof in front of the railway station

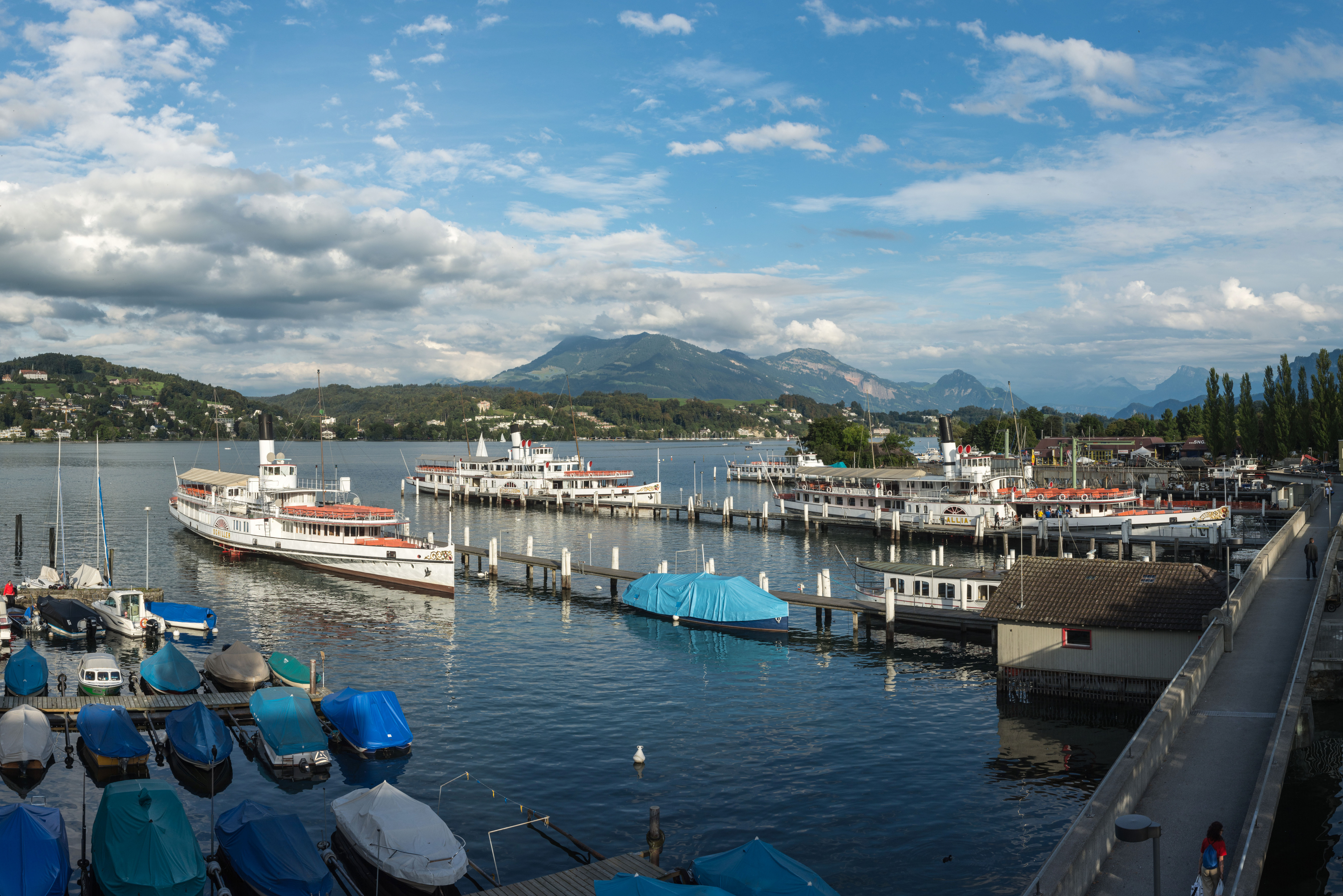
Paddle steamers Schiller, Stadt Luzern and Gallia in the harbour of Lucerne

After Ferdinand von Zeppelin landed his airship in Lucerne in 1909, the city became a pioneer for the aeronautical industry in Switzerland. In February 1910 the country's first (and after the DELAG of Germany the second in the world) air transport company was founded, in July the same year then also the first airship hangar at Tribschenmoos. The company provided flights with airships until 1914 without notable accidents.

Lucerne boasts a developed and well-run transport network, with the main operator, Verkehrsbetriebe Luzern (VBL), running both the trolleybuses in Lucerne and a motor buses network in the city and to neighboring municipalities. Other operators, such as PostAuto Schweiz and Auto AG Rothenburg, provide bus services to other towns and villages.

Lucerne railway station is one of Switzerland's principal stations, and is well-connected to the rest of Switzerland via railway services operated by Swiss Federal Railways (SBB CFF FFS), the Südostbahn (SOB), the BLS and the Zentralbahn (zb). It is served by national and international trains as well as local trains of the Lucerne S-Bahn. There are 40 trains per day between Lucerne and Zurich, with an average travel time of 48 minutes. Zurich Airport can be reached in just over an hour. The Voralpen Express directly links Lucerne with Eastern Switzerland.

Adjacent to the station is Luzern Bahnhofquai, from which ships of the Lake Lucerne Navigation Company operate to various destinations on Lake Lucerne. Between April and mid October, the tourist oriented Gotthard Panorama Express connects Lucerne with Lugano once a day by boat and train, travelling by boat along the length of Lake Lucerne and then by train over the historic high-level Gotthard route.

Three other railway stations are located within the city boundaries, with Lucerne Allmend/Messe close to the Swissporarena in the south of the city, Luzern Littau in the former municipality of Littau and the Luzern Verkehrshaus adjacent to the Swiss Museum of Transport in the east.

Lucerne's city transit system is fully integrated into the coherent and integrated fare network system called passepartout encompassing all kind of public transport in the cantons of Lucerne, Obwalden, and Nidwalden.

An inclined lift (formerly a funicular railway), Gütschbahn, links the city to the Hotel Château Gütsch, 90 m above. Another inclined lift, Standseilbahn Hotel Montana, runs from near the lakeside promenade to the Hotel Montana. From 1912 to 1978, there was another funicular railway, the Dietschibergbahn on the Dietschiberg. Today, only the valley station – which has been converted into a residential building – serves as a reminder of this funicular.

== Sport ==
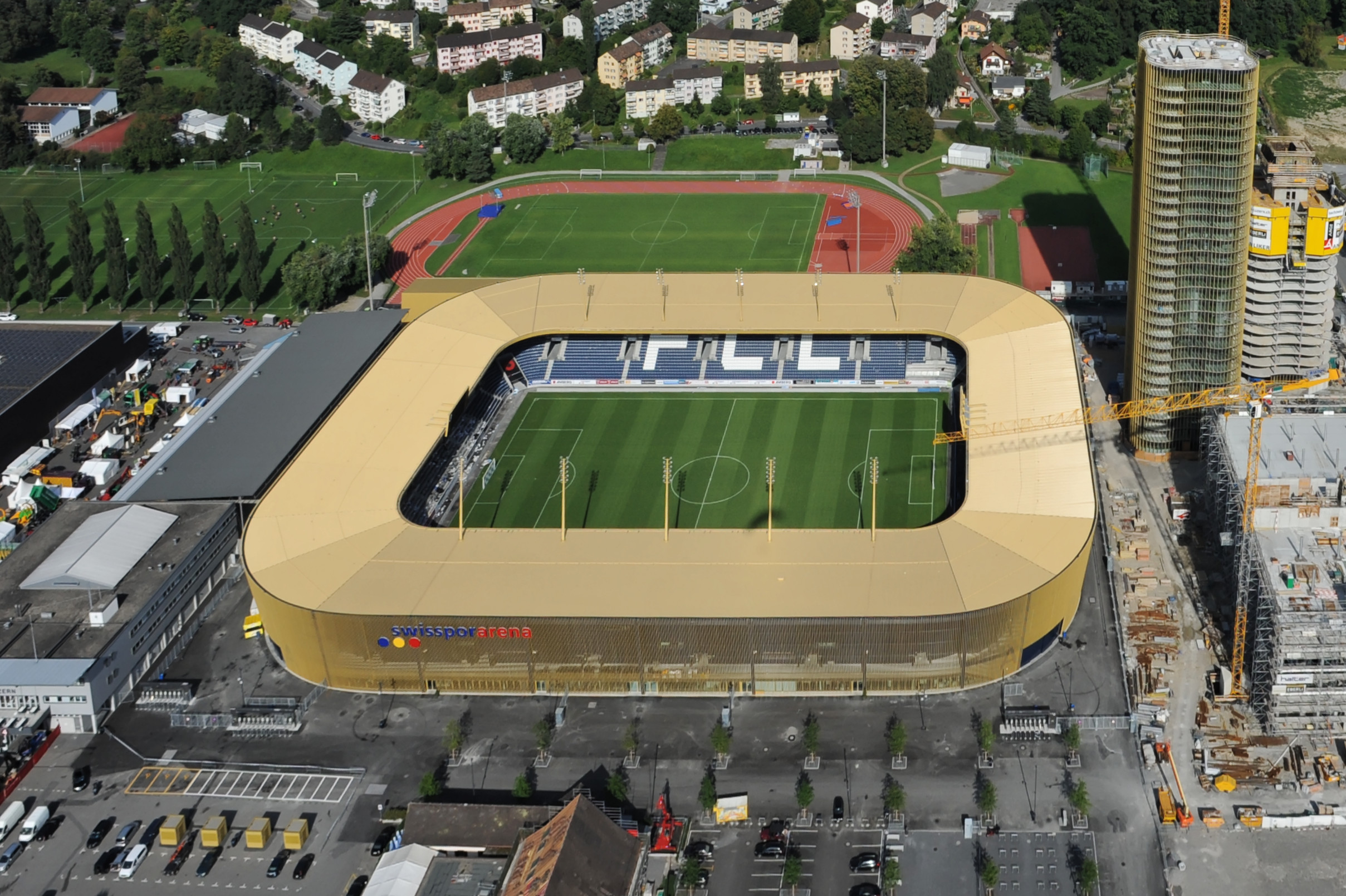
The Swissporarena is home to FC Lucerne of the Swiss Super League.

There are several football clubs throughout the city. The most successful one is FC Luzern which plays in Switzerland's premier league (Swiss Super League). The club plays its home matches at the new Swissporarena, with a capacity of 16,800.

The city's main hockey team is the HC Luzern which plays in the Swiss Second League, the fourth tier of Swiss hockey. They play their home games in the 5,000-seat Eiszentrum Luzern.

In the past, Lucerne also produced national successes in men's handball and women's volleyball and softball.

Having a long tradition of equestrian sports, Lucerne has co-hosted CSIO Switzerland, an international equestrian show jumping event, until it left entirely for St. Gallen in 2006. Since then, the Lucerne Equestrian Masters replaced it. There is also an annual horse racing event, usually taking place in August.

Lucerne annually hosts the final leg of the World Rowing Cup on Rotsee, a very silent lake at its northern outskirts. Numerous World Rowing Championships have been held in Lucerne including the inaugural World Championships of 1962 and then the regattas of 1974, 1982 and 2001.

Lucerne hosts the annual Spitzen Leichtathletik Luzern track and field meeting, which attracts world class athletes such as Yohan Blake and Valerie Adams.

The city also provides facilities for ice-hockey, figure-skating, golf, swimming, basketball, rugby, skateboarding, climbing and more.

Lucerne hosted FIVB Beach Volleyball World Tour event Lucerne Open 2015 and FIVB Beach Volleyball U21 World Championship in 2016.

== Gallery ==
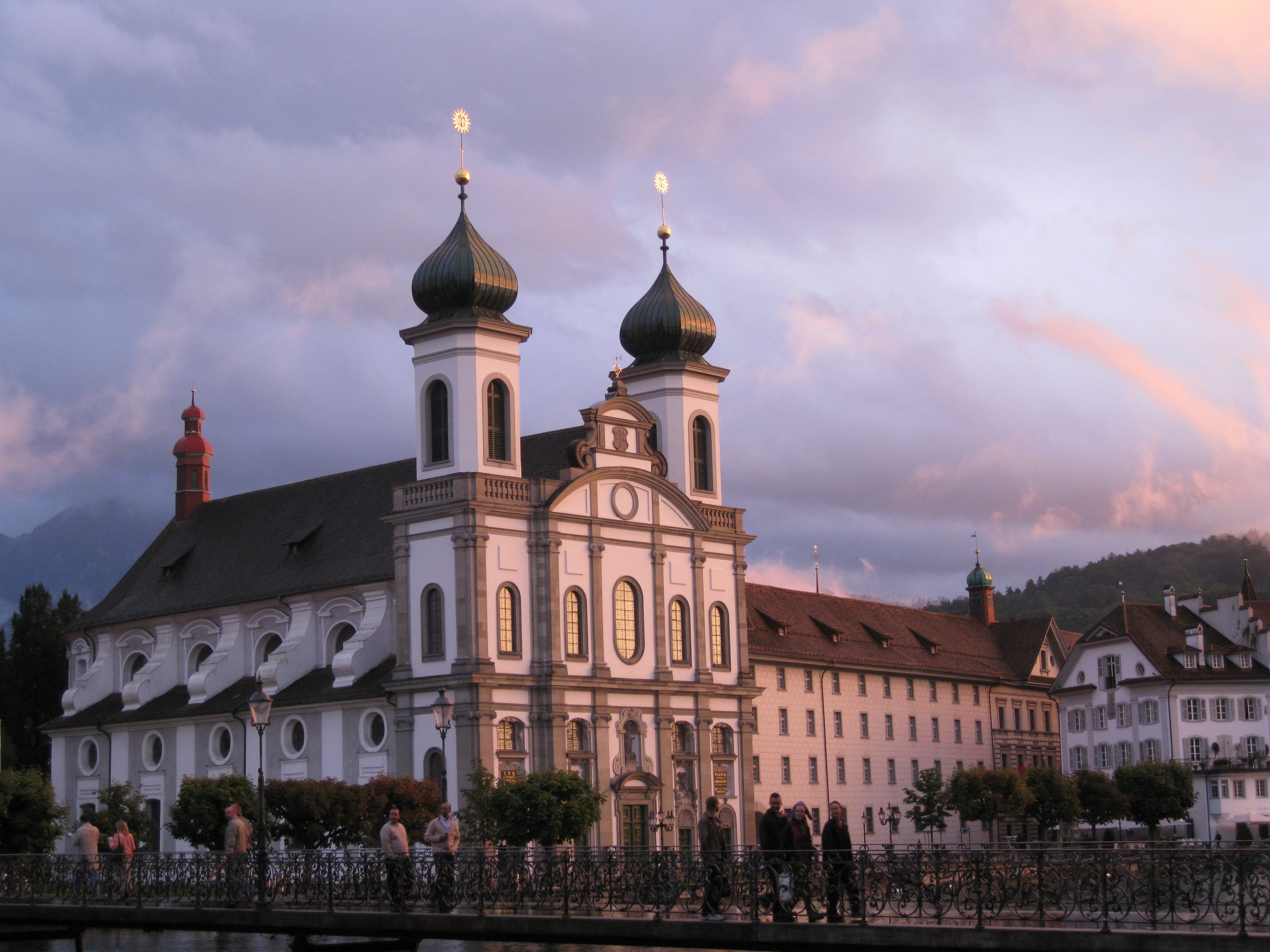
Jesuit Church

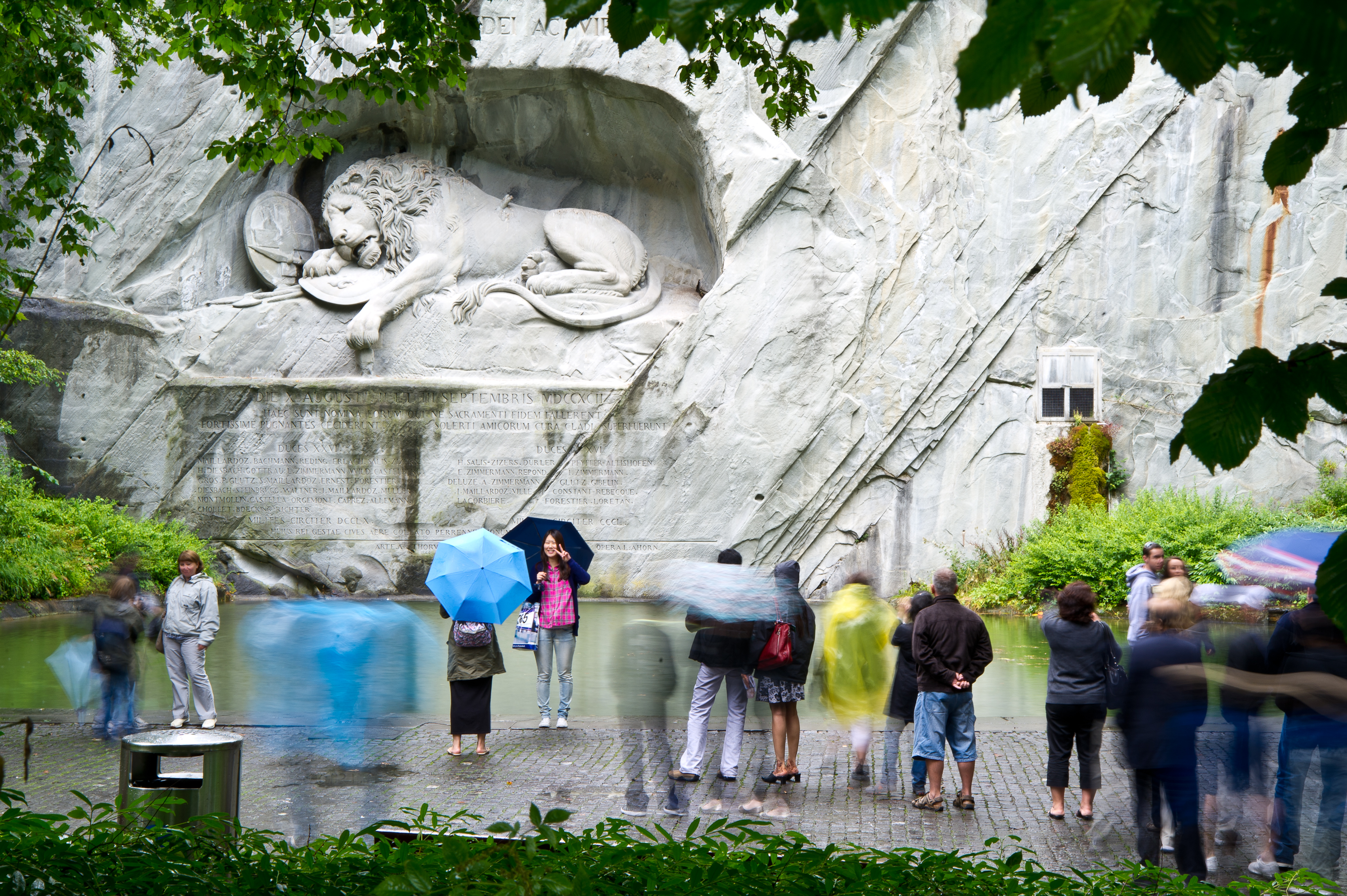
Lucerne's Lion Monument commemorates the Swiss Guards of Louis XVI who were massacred in 1792 during the French Revolution.

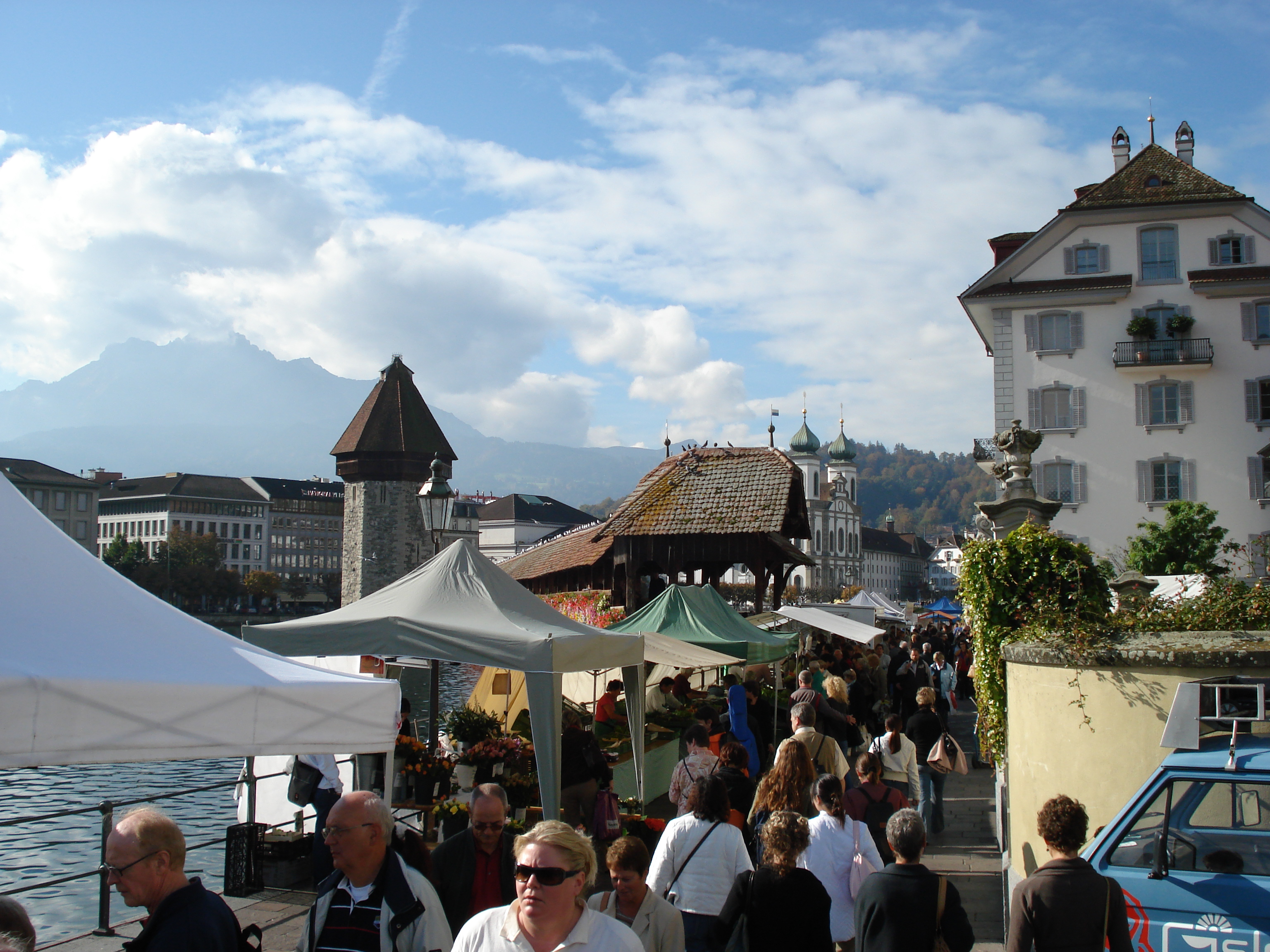
The crowded Rathausquai

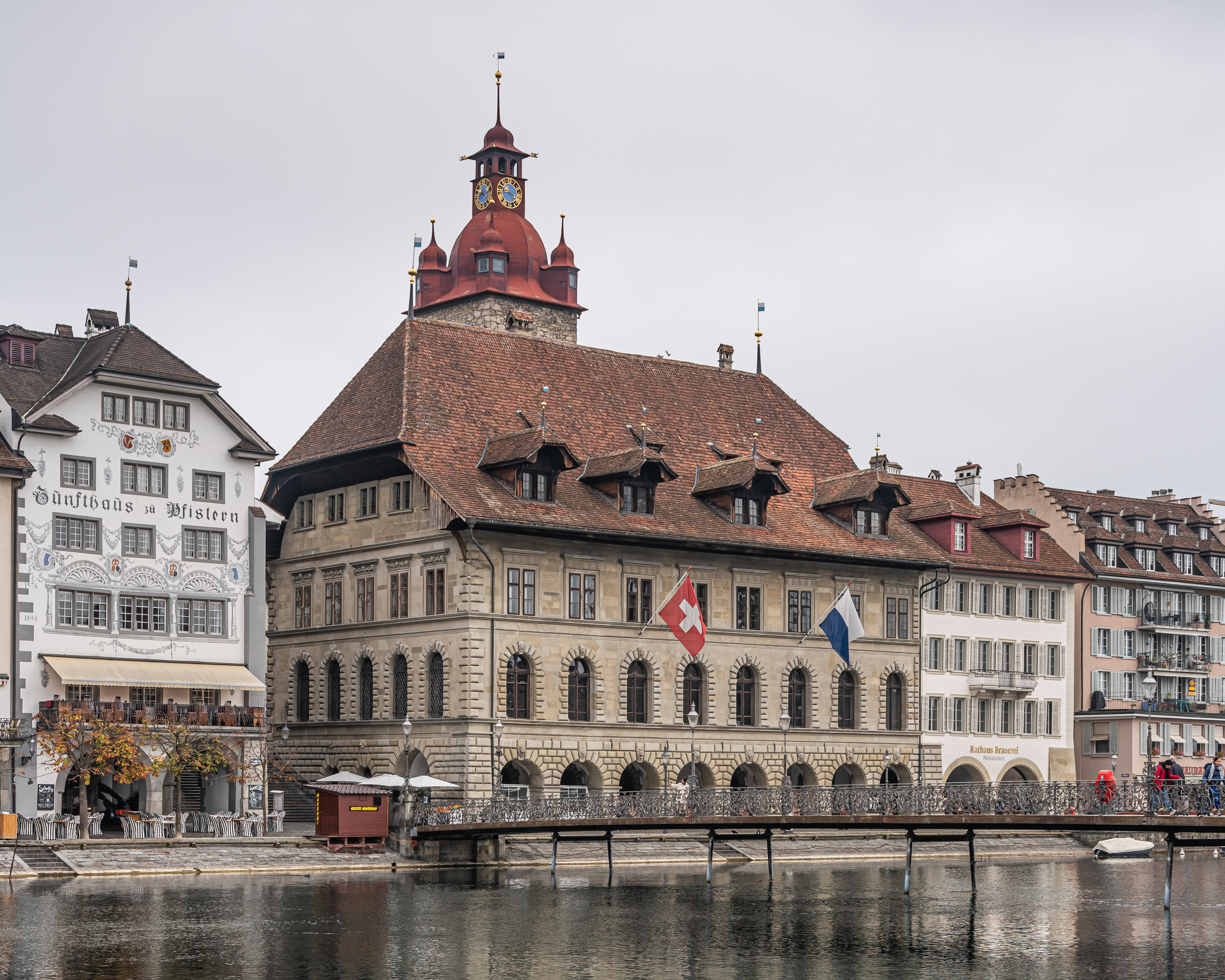
Lucerne's town hall has been home to the city's government for centuries.

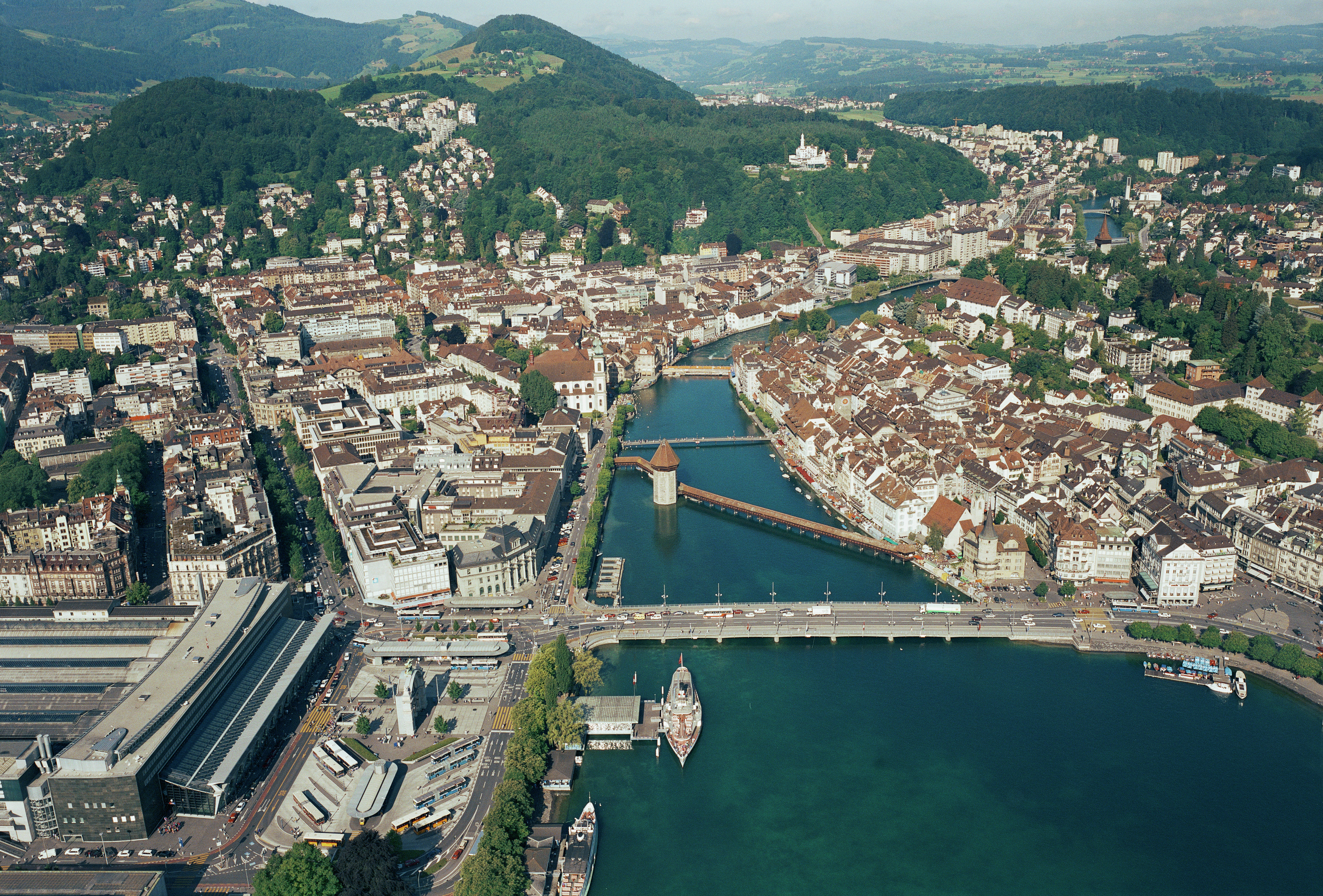
Aerial view of central Lucerne

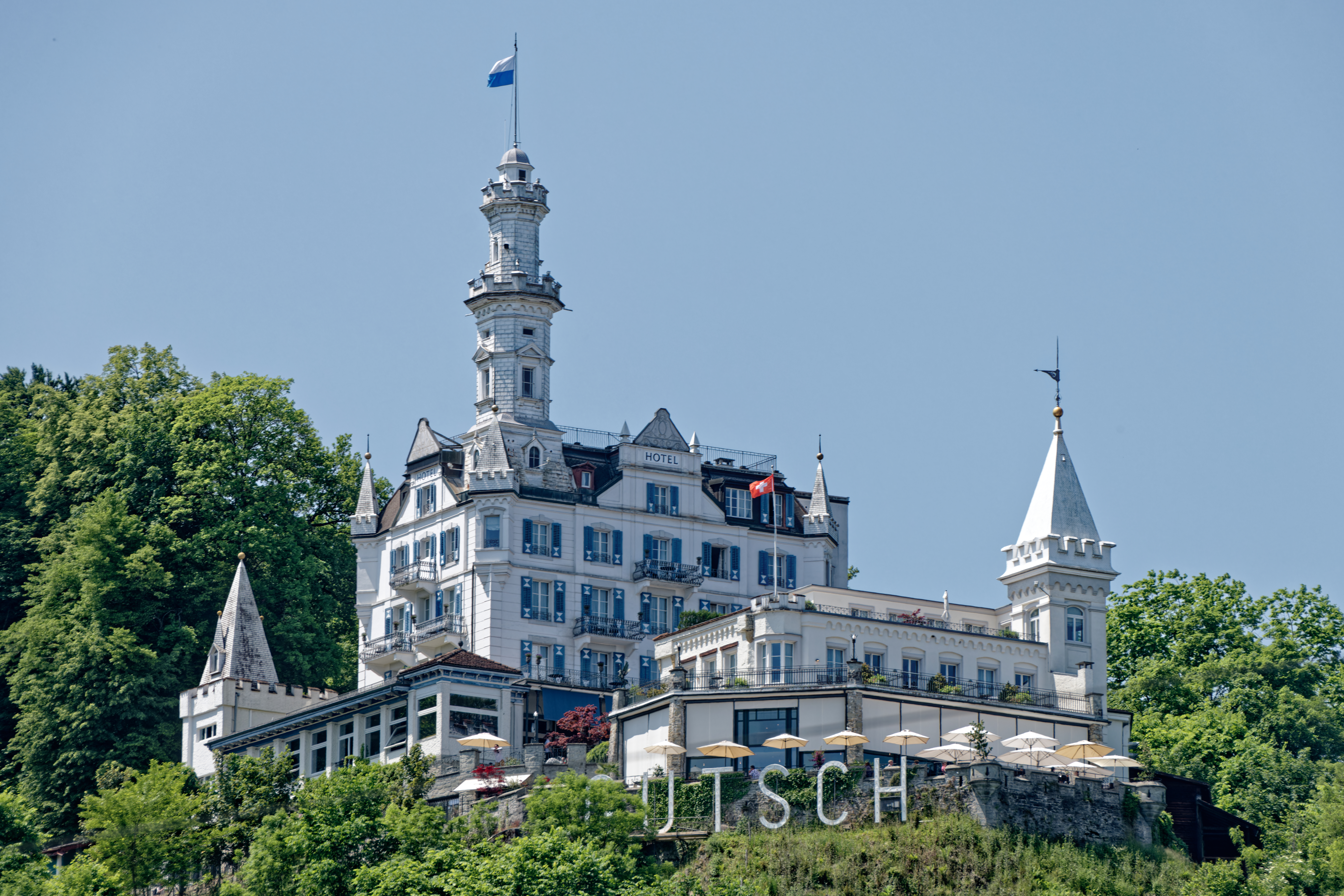
Château Gütsch

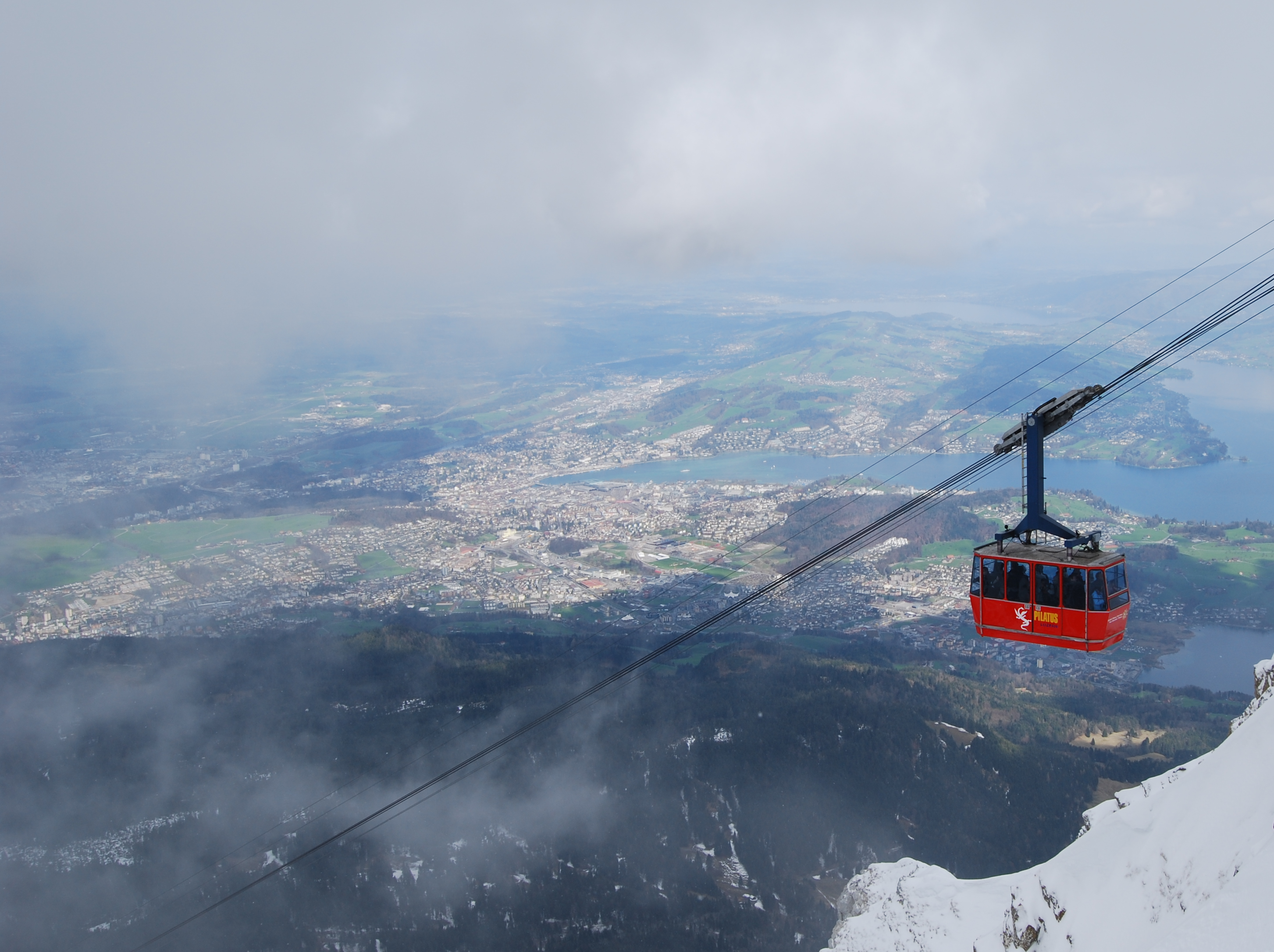
View of Lucerne from Pilatus

== See also ==
- List of mayors of Lucerne
- Lucerne Culture and Congress Centre
