= Gütsch =

Gütsch may refer to:

- Gütsch (Nätschen), an area of the Nätschen ski area in Canton Uri, Switzerland
- The Château Gütsch, a hotel in the city of Lucerne, Switzerland
- The Gütschbahn funicular, a funicular in the city of Lucerne, Switzerland
