= Castello di Santa Eurasia =

Castle near in Umbria, Italy

Coordinates: 43°11′47″N 12°22′31″E

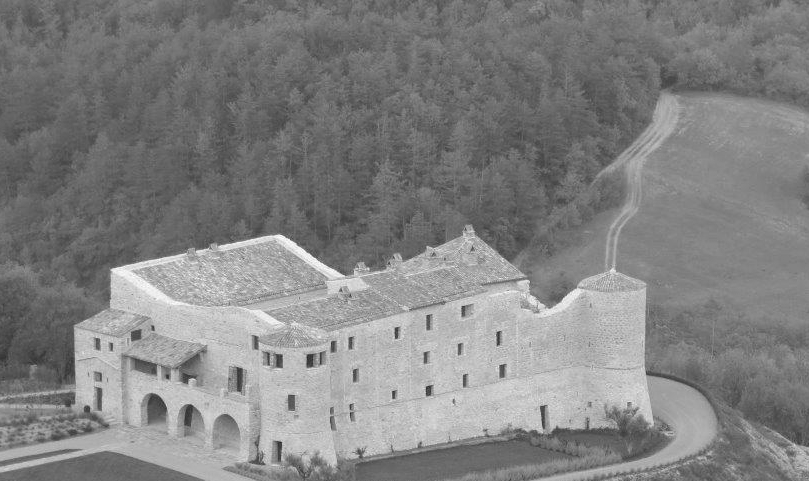
The castle in the 2010s

The Castello di Santa Eurasia is a former castle on Monte Tezio near Ponte Pattoli in Umbria, Italy. It was built in the 15th century and is owned by the Russian billionaire businessman and former KGB spy Alexander Lebedev and his son Evgeny. The Lebedevs have hosted numerous parties at the house, and visitors have included prominent politicians and celebrities, including the former British Prime Minister Boris Johnson. The villa has been monitored by Italian intelligence agencies over concerns that it has been used for espionage purposes. Lebedev also owns the nearby Palazzo Terranova.

== Location ==
The castle was known as Castello di Procopio, and was renamed Castello di Santa Eurasia by Evgeny Lebedev. It is located prominently on the mountain, Monte Tezio, near Ponte Pattoli. The building dates from the 15th century. It has portcullis gates, and is 30,000 sq ft in size.

== Interior and renovation ==
The house was decorated by Martyn Lawrence Bullard during 2011 at a cost of €10 million. Bullard said that Evgeny Lebedev had instructed him to create an interior that was "layered" and looked as if the castle and its possessions had been accumulated over many years and that the " ... driving force was his passion for the area — we spent weekends touring nearby castles and palazzos".

Architect Domenico Minchilli renovated the structure of the castle over two years, rebuilding walls and removing rubble. The facade of the castle has remained unaltered. The house has seven guest suites set over three floors with a large principal suite. It also features a gym, hammam and a spa. An emerald oblong pool is situated amidst gardens of jasmine and lavender. The castle has handmade furniture and ironwork with hand painted wooden ceilings. Notable furniture and objet d'art include "17th-century Flemish fireplaces, religious art — including a complete series of the Stations of the Cross, which sombrely adorns one stairwell — 18th-century banqueting tables and armoires, and Peruvian monks' chairs". Individual suites include the Cardinal's Suite, the Corona Room, the Icon Room and the Infanta Suite.

The chapel of the castle is dedicated to Santa Eurasia.

== Notable guests ==
The castle has been visited by many celebrities since its acquisition by the Lebedevs, including Elton John and David Furnish, Keira Knightley and James Righton and Stephen Fry and Ian Mckellen. Hugh Grant and Liz Hurley have stayed at the castle on separate occasions. Neil Patrick Harris and David Burtka married at the castle. The former prime minister Tony Blair and the politician Peter Mandelson have also visited the castle during the Lebedev's ownership.

The former British prime minister Boris Johnson has visited the castle on several occasions. The journalist and editor Sarah Sands was responsible for bringing Johnson to the castle and the Palazzo Terranova during her tenure as editor of the Evening Standard, a newspaper owned by the Lebedevs. She wrote about her visits with Johnson to the castle in her 2021 memoir of her search for the monastic life, The Interior Silence. Sands said that she once saw a dishevelled Johnson chasing Evgeny Lebedev's wolf, Boris, who had eaten the dongle for Johnson's computer. Sands wrote upon arrival at the castle they would "[prepare] for a weekend of medieval splendour; feasting, dancing, boar hunting".

Russians are discouraged from staying at the castle due to an alleged occasion when a party of Russians "trashed" the Palazzo Terranova.

The journalist Emma Wells visited and profiled the renovated castle in a 2014 article in The Times. She concluded that "No doubt a purist would find much to scoff at. The son of an oligarch, [Evgeny] Lebedev is, after all, known for his penchant for white silk suits, his wolfdog and for being his own favourite foreign correspondent. But this is no bling billionaire’s home — more the palace of a modern Machiavellian prince". She also wrote that " ... what could have easily turned into a Disney version of a medieval castle is instead a treasure trove of craftsmanship and exquisite art, with enough damask upholstered walls and one-off pieces to make a Borgia blush".

== Italian espionage report ==
The Castello di Santa Eurasia and the Palazzo Terranova, also owned by the Lebedevs, have been monitored by Italian intelligence agencies over concerns that they have been used as for espionage purposes. A secret report by Italian security services for Prime Minister Giuseppe Conte "queried whether [Alexander Lebedev] had genuinely severed ties with Russian intelligence after leaving the KGB decades earlier" and also said that his resignation from the KGB was "considered by many to be unclear".

The Italian parliamentarian Lia Quartapelle said that "Clearly from the report, it stands out that the properties were part and tool of a network of relationships. They were part and tool of a strategy of influence. And so it was noticed who was there, how many times people went there and so on".
