= Asiaciti Trust =

Hong Kong–based financial company

- Industry: Financial services
- Founded: 7 July 1978
- Founder: Graeme W. Briggs
- Headquarters: Singapore
- Area served: Worldwide
- Services: Personal fiduciary services; Corporate services
- Website: www.asiacititrust.com

Asiaciti Trust is an international financial company established in Hong Kong, with operations in Asia, the Americas, and the Pacific. Its services revolve around corporate services, fiduciary matters, wealth protection, and administration.

== Background ==
Asiaciti Trust was established in British Hong Kong in 1978. The founder of Asiaciti Trust, Australian Graeme W. Briggs, was formerly the international tax partner of Marquand & Co. He acquired the international operations of Marquand & Co in 1975. He was a founding Senator of the Offshore Institute. Asiaciti moved its headquarters to Singapore in late 1984. In September 2020, Asiaciti Trust appointed Colin Porter as Group Managing Director. In the same year, Asiaciti Trust also appointed a new Managing Director for its New Zealand office, Kate Weiss. In January 2021, Asiaciti Trust appointed a new Managing Director for its Singapore office, Ross Belhomme.

== Controversy ==
The company was associated with both the Paradise Papers data leak and the Pandora Papers leak. The Pandora Papers leaks revealed that the company helped Kirill Androsov, a former aide to Russian leader Vladimir Putin, set up offshore companies so that he could engage in transactions with Russian oligarch Oleg Deripaska. The company helped fugitive Moldovan politician Vladimir Plahotniuc.

== See also ==
- Intertrust Group
- TMF Group
