= Evgeny Lebedev =

Russian-British businessman (born 1980)

The Right Honourable The Lord Lebedev
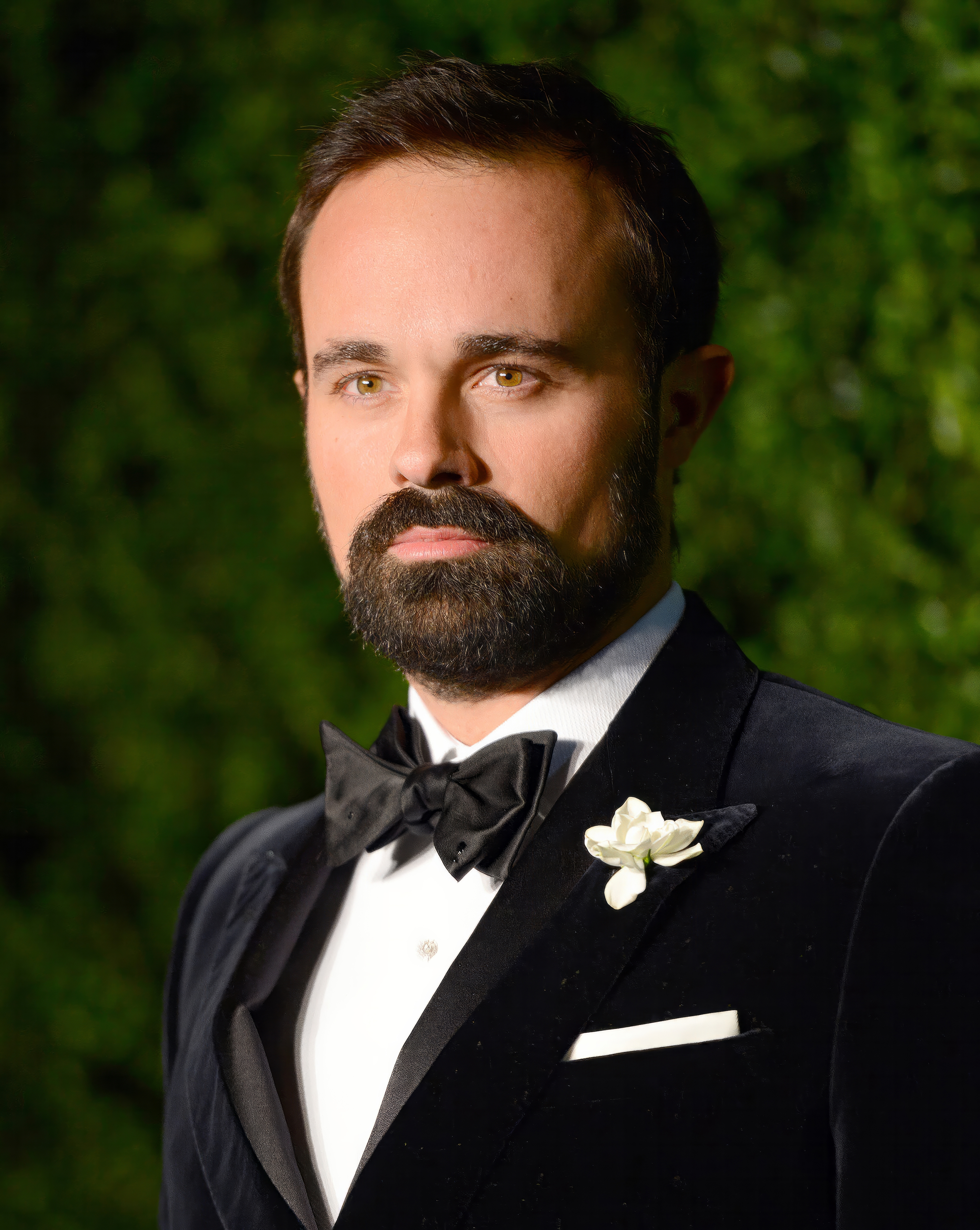
- Lebedev in 2012

Member of the House of Lords
- Lord Temporal
- Life peerage 19 November 2020

Personal details
- Born: Evgeny Alexandrovich Lebedev; 8 May 1980 (age 46) Moscow, Russian SFSR, Soviet Union
- Party: Crossbench
- Parent: Alexander Lebedev (father)
- Relatives: Vladimir Sokolov (grandfather)
- Education: Holland Park School; Mill Hill School

Evgeny Alexandrovich Lebedev, Baron Lebedev (Russian: Евгений Александрович Лебедев, romanized: Yevgeniy Aleksandrovich Lebedev, (Note: The BGN/PCGN transliteration of Russian is used for his name here. ALA-LC system: Evgeniĭ Aleksandrovich Lebedev, ISO 9 system: Evgenij Aleksandrovič Lebedev.) pronounced [jɪvˈɡʲenʲɪj ˈlʲebʲɪdʲɪf]; born 8 May 1980) is a Russian-British businessman, who owns Lebedev Holdings Ltd, which in turn owns the Evening Standard and the now-defunct ESTV (London Live). He is also an investor in The Independent.

In July 2020, Lebedev was nominated for a life peerage by British prime minister Boris Johnson for philanthropy and services to the media, a move that drew widespread criticism due to Lebedev's father having been a KGB agent. He was appointed to be a crossbench life peer in the House of Lords as Lord Lebedev in November 2020. His full title is Baron Lebedev, of Hampton in the London Borough of Richmond upon Thames and of Siberia in the Russian Federation.

== Early life and education ==
Born in Moscow, Lebedev is the son of Alexander Lebedev, a Russian banker and former officer of the First Chief Directorate of the USSR's KGB and later its successor, the SVR, and his first wife, engineer Natalia Sokolova; his maternal grandfather Vladimir Sokolov was a scientist, and a member of the Academy of Sciences of the USSR, later the Russian Academy of Sciences.

He moved to London at the age of eight, when his father began working at the Soviet Embassy. He attended St Barnabas and St Philip's Church of England Primary School in Kensington, followed by Holland Park Comprehensive School and Mill Hill School. He has lived in the UK ever since, and became a British citizen (with dual nationality) in 2010.

== Media interests ==
On 21 January 2009, Evgeny and his father bought a 65% share in the Evening Standard newspaper. Together with other minority shareholders including Justin Byam Shaw and Geordie Greig, Lebedev bought a 75.1% interest in the newspaper for a nominal sum of £1. The previous owners, Daily Mail and General Trust plc, continue to hold 24.9% of the company, but will not have a seat on its board or direct involvement in editorial policy.

It is estimated the newspaper was losing as much as £25m annually at the time. Under the Lebedevs' ownership, it became a free newspaper in October 2009; circulation tripled immediately to 700,000.

On 25 March 2010, just weeks before it was due to close, Lebedev bought The Independent and The Independent on Sunday. On 26 October, the i newspaper was launched, the first national daily newspaper to be launched in the UK since The Independent in 1986, at a time of falling newspaper circulations and title closures. In 2011, he launched The Journalism Foundation, to promote "free and independent journalism throughout the world", although it was closed down after a year.

In February 2016, it was announced that Independent Press Ltd had reached an agreement to sell the i to Johnston Press, and that The Independent would become digital-only from March 2016. In 2019, it was reported that the government's then Culture Secretary Jeremy Wright issued a public interest intervention notice and investigation into Lebedev's sale of a 30% stake in the publications to a private Saudi investor. The Competition and Markets Authority's investigation found that the sale "would not result in a 'substantial lessening of competition'." Ofcom judged that the sale had not led to "any influence" on the news outlets controlled by the British-Russian businessman.

== Other business interests, real estate, and political influence ==
Lebedev co-owns The Grapes, a riverside pub in Limehouse, London, with Ian McKellen and Sean Mathias. In 2012 he purchased the hotel Château Gütsch in Lucerne, Switzerland, and commissioned Martyn Lawrence Bullard to renovate it. He later sold it to Kirill Androsov.

He has been reported to own a flat in central London near Regent's Park as well as the Grade II-listed mansion Stud House in the grounds of Hampton Court Palace. Lebedev and his father own the Palazzo Terranova in Ronti and the nearby Castello di Santa Eurasia near Monte Tezio in rural Perugia, Italy.

He had maintained friendship with Boris Johnson since the late 2000s, with Lebedev's Evening Standard endorsing Johnson as the mayor of London. Johnson has been reported to have attended vodka and caviar parties hosted by Alexander and Evgeny Lebedev in the UK and Italy throughout the 2010s.

=== Peerage ===
In July 2020, Lebedev was nominated for a life peerage by Boris Johnson in the 2020 Political Honours. On 19 November 2020, he was created Baron Lebedev, of Hampton in the London Borough of Richmond upon Thames and of Siberia in the Russian Federation. He was introduced to the House of Lords on 17 December, supported by Lord Bird and Lord Clarke of Nottingham. Lebedev sits in the Lords as a crossbencher, and made his maiden speech on 12 May 2021 during the debate on the Queen's Speech after the 2021 State Opening of Parliament.

The Sunday Times reported that security services were uneasy over Lebedev from 2013 and Lebedev's father was a KGB agent. SNP leader Ian Blackford wanted Lebedev's parliamentary pass revoked due to these concerns. Lord McFall of Alcluith, the Lord Speaker, said the procedure for vetting new peers should be tightened up. Lebedev has stated that he is not a security risk and is "proud to be a British citizen and consider Britain my home". He said his father "spent his time campaigning against corruption and illegal financial dealings" and his family "has a record of standing up for press freedom" in Russia.

Allegations of cronyism were made against the appointment, which was described as a 'surprise', and indicative of close ties between the British establishment and prominent Russians. In March 2022, the Labour Party tabled a motion in the House of Commons that would force the government to reveal security advice given to Johnson about Lebedev's peerage. The motion was supported by a number of Conservative MPs, and it passed on 29 March, requiring the documents to be made available to MPs by 28 April 2022. However, the deadline was missed and the Cabinet Office minister Michael Ellis confirmed that more time was needed to consider what information could be divulged. A few weeks later the government informed the House of Commons that, in order to "protect national security", the detailed security advice would not be released. Lebedev expressed disappointment about the decision not to release the advice, and called for the full document to be provided to the House.

In November 2023, Lebedev gave a speech in the House of Lords warning against the erosion of free speech. Arguing that he would even defend the right of Jeremy Corbyn to praise Hamas, the peer added that he had read "industrial quantities of falsehoods about myself". As of January 2024, Lebedev has only attended the House of Lords twice, and is one of its least active members.

== Charity work ==
Lebedev is the patron of the Evening Standard's Dispossessed Fund, which helps to address poverty in London, and has raised over £13m since its launch in 2010. In 2018, he launched #AIDSFree, a cross-title campaign between The Independent and Evening Standard to raise money for the Elton John AIDS Foundation. In 2019, he announced that both newspapers would launch a multiple-year campaign to tackle homelessness in London and around the world.

Since the coronavirus lockdown began in the United Kingdom, Lebedev's news titles appealed in partnership with food surplus charity The Felix Project to supply food to vulnerable people, frontline charities and NHS hospitals. In December 2020, the 'Food for London Now' appeal announced that it had surpassed its £10 million target and delivered 20 million meals.

== Personal life ==
According to The Daily Telegraph, Lebedev previously dated British actress Joely Richardson.

Lebedev collects modern British art, and owns pieces by Tracey Emin, Sir Antony Gormley, Damien Hirst, Francis Bacon, Lucian Freud and Jake and Dinos Chapman. According to the New Statesman, he also has a wide knowledge of Renaissance art and vorticist poetry. He had a pet wolf called Boris, named after the former Russian president Boris Yeltsin.

He derives his wealth from his father, Alexander Lebedev, a Russian oligarch and former KGB officer.
