= Kirill Androsov =

Russian businessman

- Кирилл Андросов
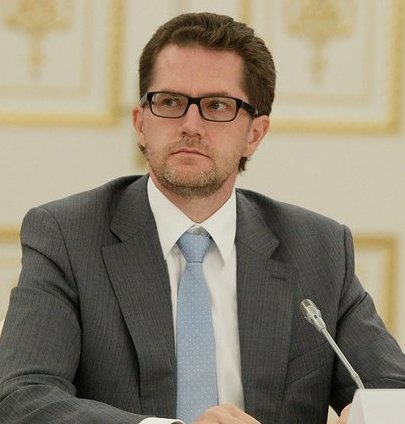
- Androsov in 2011
- Born: June 13, 1972 (age 54); Murmansk, U.S.S.R.
- Occupation: Businessman

Kirill Androsov (born June 1972) is a Russian businessman, economist, and investor.

Androsov is a former Deputy Minister of the Ministry of Economic Development and Trade of the Russian Federation and Deputy Chief of Staff of the Office of the Russian Government when Russian leader Vladimir Putin was Prime Minister. He is the former chairman of the board of Russian national airline Aeroflot and Russian Railways (RZhD) He has the federal state civilian service rank of 1st class Active State Councillor of the Russian Federation.

Since 2012, Androsov is a professor of economics at the Russian National Research University's Higher School of Economics.

== Early life ==
Androsov was born in Murmansk, Russia, in 1972. He graduated with a master's degree from the Saint Petersburg State Marine Technical University in 1994. He then completed a doctorate at the Saint Petersburg State University of Engineering and Economics. In 2005 he earned an MBA from the University of Chicago.

== Career ==
Early in his career, Androsov worked for Hansa Investments Oy, a boutique Finnish investment banking firm, and St Petersburg’s Property Management Committee, in charge of attracting foreign investments to the city of St. Petersburg.

From 1999 to 2004 Androsov served as Deputy CEO and then CFO of Lenenergo a Russian energy utility company.

Androsov joined the Russian Ministry for Economic Development and Trade, where he began his career as director for tariff regulation and infrastructure reform and later served as Deputy Economic Development and Trade Minister. He served as Deputy Chief of Staff to the Russian Government between 2008 and 2010, during which time Vladimir Putin was Prime Minister . During his six years working for the Russian government he served on the board of directors at RAO UES, Rosneft, Zarubezhneft, VTB, Svyazinvest and VVC. He has been chairman of the boards of Aeroflot and Russian Railways, and a member of the board of directors for Channel One Russia, LSR Group, and Altera Capital.

After working in the Russian public sector, Androsov set up investment funds and established a business presence in Singapore.

Amongst other investments, Androsov owns the historic hotel Château Gütsch in Lucerne, Switzerland. Androsov bought the property in June 2021 from its previous owner, the Russian oligarch Alexander Lebedev.

=== Pandora Papers ===
The Pandora Papers leaks found that one of Androsov's funds was linked to a corruption scandal in the Maldives that cost the country nearly $80 million. Lang Capital Fund had invested in an island resort in the Maldives. The Fund's investment and many others ultimately disappeared, and no resorts were ever built. Leaked documents implicated former Maldives President Abdulla Yameen in the scheme. Androsov denied that he or Lang Capital had engaged in any wrongdoing. President Yameen was convicted of fraud charges related to the scandal in 2019, but was released on an appeal in his case in 2021.

Androsov's name appeared in the Pandora Papers and the Paradise Papers along with other Singapore-based Russian businessmen in connection with compliance failures by a Singapore-based firm, Asiaciti Trust. Asiaciti was cited by regulators for its inadequate risk assessment and monitoring of some of the trust structures used by its Russians clients. Many of Asiaciti's clients, including Lang Capital Fund, were accused of being set up by closely-linked Politically-Exposed Persons. Androsov was linked to Evgeny Novitsky, a Russian billionaire who has held shares in one of Russia’s largest cellphone networks and leads RTI Systems, which makes high-end electronics. Asiaciti suspected that Novitsky was actually in control of companies registered to Androsov. Androsov denied the allegations.

The Monetary Authority of Singapore (MAS) noted that a “series of circular fund flows — including some demonstrating no plausible economic purpose — were allowed to pass through the trust accounts managed by Asiaciti.” In April 2019, Asiaciti staff acknowledged “instances of inconsistencies and transactions that do not make clear economic sense” in relation to its Russian clients. Executives at the firm decided to sever ties with Androsov's companies and planned to file “suspicious transaction reports” with authorities. In July 2020, MAS fined Asiaciti $1.1 million for breaches identified in their investigation. MAS made no findings that Androsov was involved in money laundering or any other illegal activity connected with the trust structures set up and administered by Asiaciti. In October 2021, Androsov told the Australian Broadcasting Corporation that he still does business with Asiaciti.
