= Palazzo Terranova =

Villa in Umbria, Italy

Coordinates: 43°24′28.76″N 12°9′56.46″E

The Palazzo Terranova is a villa in Ronti, near Città di Castello in Umbria, Italy. It was built in the 18th century and has been owned by Alexander Lebedev since 2006. It was opened as a country hotel in the 1990s. Lebedev and his son, Evgeny, have hosted numerous parties at the house, and visitors have included prominent politicians and celebrities, including the former British Prime Minister Boris Johnson. The villa has been monitored by Italian intelligence agencies over concerns that it has been used as for espionage purposes. Lebedev also owns the nearby Castello di Santa Eurasia.

== Location ==
The villa dates from the 18th century. It overlooks the Tiber Valley in Ronti near Città di Castello in Umbria and is accessed by a steep winding road.

== History ==
In 1989 it was bought by the banker Johnny Townsend, who was formerly vice-chairman at Hoare Govett Corporate Finance, and his wife Sarah. The couple restored the dilapidated villa over 10 years and subsequently opened it as a country hotel. Their daughter, Honor, served as head chef at the villa. Sarah Townsend had previously owned and run the Il Bacchino hotel in nearby Cortona. Musicians Sophie Ellis-Bextor and Richard Jones married at the Palazzo Terrnova in 2005.

=== Alexander Lebedev ===
The villa was put up for sale for in £4.5 million in 2005 (equivalent to £7,616,004 in 2023). In 2006 the Palazzo Terranova was bought by the Russian businessman and former KGB spy Alexander Lebedev. The villa has continued to be available to paying guests since Lebedev's purchase. The 2009 Rough Guide to Tuscany and Umbria described the villa as "sublime but expensive" with 10 individually designed rooms. A party of Russian guests once 'trashed' the villa during their stay and subsequent Russian visitors have since been 'generally discouraged' from staying at the villa.

A house party given by Marion and Philippe Lambert at the villa in June 2008 was detailed by Taki Theodoracopulos in his High Life column in The Spectator. He described the house as an "architectural jewel, with the intimacy of a private family home with its eight bedrooms decorated in the timeless elegance of Palladian tradition" the guests included " ... German and Italian nobles, [and a] Polish prince and princess".

The Palazzo Terranova and the Castello di Santa Eurasia, also owned by Lebedev, have been monitored by Italian intelligence agencies over concerns that they have been used as for espionage purposes. A secret report by Italian security services for Prime Minister Giuseppe Conte "queried whether [Alexander Lebedev] had genuinely severed ties with Russian intelligence after leaving the KGB decades earlier" and also said that his resignation from the KGB was "considered by many to be unclear".

The Italian parliamentarian Lia Quartapelle said that "Clearly from the report, it stands out that the properties were part and tool of a network of relationships. They were part and tool of a strategy of influence. And so it was noticed who was there, how many times people went there and so on".

Alexander Lebedev's Borzoi dog was found dead on the grounds of the villa in late 2018. James Cusick wrote for OpenDemocracy that Lebedev subsequently "told associates that he believes the dog was poisoned and that it was a message from Moscow".

=== Visits by Boris Johnson ===
The British politician Boris Johnson has visited the villa on at least six occasions since his 2012 election as Mayor of London and during his subsequent time as the British Foreign Secretary. He was accompanied on some visits by Marina Wheeler, then his wife. On his trips to the villa Johnson frequently flew to and from Italy on Lebedev's private jet. Johnson stayed at the villa every October from 2011 to 2016.

An October 2016 party at the villa hosted by Lebedev's son, Evgeny, was attended by Johnson and Wheeler, as well as Johnson's brother Leo, the actress Joan Collins, the singer Pixie Lott and Katie Price. Price was seated next to Johnson, and as was customary at gatherings at the villa was invited to make a toast. Price addressed Lebedev as "You Guv", said that "champagne and Pricey don't mix" and then "lifted her top to expose her breasts" and turned to Johnson as she did so. She was then escorted from the table by Lebedev's personal bodyguard. The incident was later reported in The Sun and Price's mother, Amy, wrote in her memoir that Price was "construed as the outsider who wasn't welcome at the ball".

Johnson made a solo visit to the villa in April 2018, when he was the Foreign Secretary. Johnson flew directly to the villa after attending a summit with leaders of NATO countries and the United States Secretary of State, Mike Pompeo, on the aftermath of the poisoning of the former Russian military intelligence and double agent Sergei Skripal and his daughter Yulia Skripal in the English city of Salisbury. Johnson met Alexander Lebedev at the villa during his stay. He attended the villa without his customary police protection or ministerial officials, returning via Pisa Airport on Easyjet where he was noticed in a dishevelled state by members of the public. He subsequently told a Liaison Committee of the House of Commons that "as far as [he was] aware" no government business was discussed while at the villa.
