= Vladimir Sokolov (scientist) =

Russian scientist

- Born: Vladimir Yevgenyevich Sokolov; 1 February 1928; Moscow, Russian SFSR, Soviet Union (now Russia)
- Died: 19 April 1998 (aged 70)
- Education: Doctor of Sciences (1964); Academician of the Russian Academy of Sciences; Professor
- Alma mater: Moscow State University (1950)
- Relatives: Evgeny Lebedev (grandson)
- Scientific career
- Fields: Biology
- Workplaces: Moscow State University

Vladimir Yevgenyevich Sokolov (Russian: Владимир Евгеньевич Соколов; 1 February 1928 – 19 April 1998) was a Russian scientist in the field of zoology and ecology. He was a member of the Academy of Sciences of the Soviet Union, Russian Academy of Sciences and the Brundtland Commission. He was one of the pioneers of the Russian environmentalism movement and one of the early global sustainability advocates.

Sokolov was professor and head of the Department of Vertebrate Zoology at the Faculty of Biology at Moscow State University; director of the Institute of Evolutionary Animal Morphology and Ecology at the Russian Academy of Sciences; and deputy chairman of Chemical, Technological and Biological Sciences at the USSR Academy of Sciences.

He is the grandfather of Evgeny Lebedev, owner of the London Evening Standard and The Independent (with and after his father, Alexander Lebedev).

== Life ==
Sokolov was born in Moscow, the son of a zoology professor.

He graduated from Moscow State University in 1950 with aspirations to become a mammalogist. He then became a senior lecturer and head of postgraduate Studies at the Moscow Institute of Fisheries (1953–1956); professor and head of the Department of Soil and Biology Faculty at Moscow State University (1956–1967) and later director of the Institute of Evolutionary Morphology and Ecology of Animals. He was member of the Academy of Sciences of the Soviet Union (1967–1998) and also the International Academy of Science, Munich. In 1990 Sokolov became a foreign honorary member of the American Academy of Arts and Sciences.

His research focused on ecology, morphology, electron microscopy and histology, the hydrodynamics of swimming and environmental physiology, bionics and telemetry, radio-ecology and ecotoxicology and ground-based environmental monitoring. He showed great interest in environmental law and wildlife management issues, conservation of biodiversity and rare species, the history of zoology and environmental education.

During his work Sokolov organised numerous zoological expeditions in the Soviet Union, as well as abroad to Bolivia, Cuba, Ethiopia, Mexico, Mongolia, Peru and Vietnam. His research interests were diverse. He studied radiobiology in the wake of the Chernobyl disaster, as well as the ethology and the systematics of mammals.

A species of rodent, Cricetulus sokolovi, and a shrew, Crocidura sokolovi, were named after him. Also, a species of legless lizard, Dopasia sokolovi, was named in his honour.

Sokolov was also one of the first authors to write about the concept of biosphere reserves.

== Awards and honors ==
- Order of the Red Banner of Labour (1975)
- Two USSR State Prizes (1984, 1990)
- Order of Lenin (1988)
- Demidov Prize (1996)
- Order of Courage (1997)
- Honoured Scientist of the Russian Federation (1998)

== Selected publications ==
Sokolov published about 1000 scientific papers.

- V.E. Sokolov: Nature Reserves of the USSR: National Parks and Reserves (Zapovedniki SSSR) (Russian Edition) (Russian) Hardcover – December 31, 1998.
- V.E. Sokolov: The Rare Animals of Mongolia Paperback – May, 1998.
- V.E. Sokolov et al.: Ecological and Genetic Consequences of the Chernobyl Atomic Power Plant Accident. Plant Ecology September 1993, Volume 109, Issue 1, pp 91–99, Springer.
