= Stud House =

House in London, England

Coordinates: 51.4042°N 0.3232°W

Stud House is an early 18th-century house in the centre of Hampton Court Park near Hampton Court Palace. It is Grade II listed on the National Heritage List for England. It was traditionally the official residence of the Master of the Horse. The former stables at the house are separately listed, also at Grade II. The Stud House was built in the 18th century and was altered and expanded between 1817 and 1818.

Stud House was bought by the Russian publisher Evgeny Lebedev in 2007. Its gardens were featured in the 2017 book The Secret Gardeners by Victoria Summerley and photographer Hugo Rittson Thomas.

== Source ==
- Summerley, Victoria; Rittson Thomas, Hugo (2017) The Secret Gardeners, Francis Lincoln. ISBN 9780711237636
