= Moskovsky Korrespondent =

Russian newspaper (2007–08)

- Type: Weekly newspaper
- Format: A3
- Owner: Alexander Lebedev
- Publisher: Artem Artemov
- Editor-in-chief: Gregory Nekhoroshev (Sep 2007 – Sep 2008); Akram Murtazaev (Sep–Oct 2008)
- Founded: 1 September 2007
- Ceased publication: 29 October 2008
- Language: Russian
- Headquarters: Moscow, Russia
- Circulation: 150,000
- Website: www.moscor.ru

Moskovsky Korrespondent (Russian: «Московский корреспондент») was a Russian newspaper which was printed in Moscow from 1 September 2007 to 29 October 2008.

== History ==
In September 2007, Russian businessman and former United Russia Party Member of Parliament Alexander Lebedev launched the newspaper through his publishing company. Gregory Nekhoroshev was appointed as editor-in-chief, later replaced by Akram Murtazaev. The newspaper was printed on A3 paper format with 12 pages and had an initial circulation of 150,000. The paper was sister publication of Novaya Gazeta.

Moskovsky Korrespondent was effectively closed in April 2008, after running a story that Russian president Vladimir Putin had divorced his wife Lyudmila Putina and was to marry gymnast Alina Kabaeva. It was relaunched on 1 September 2008 but finally closed on 29 October 2008.

== Controversy and closure ==
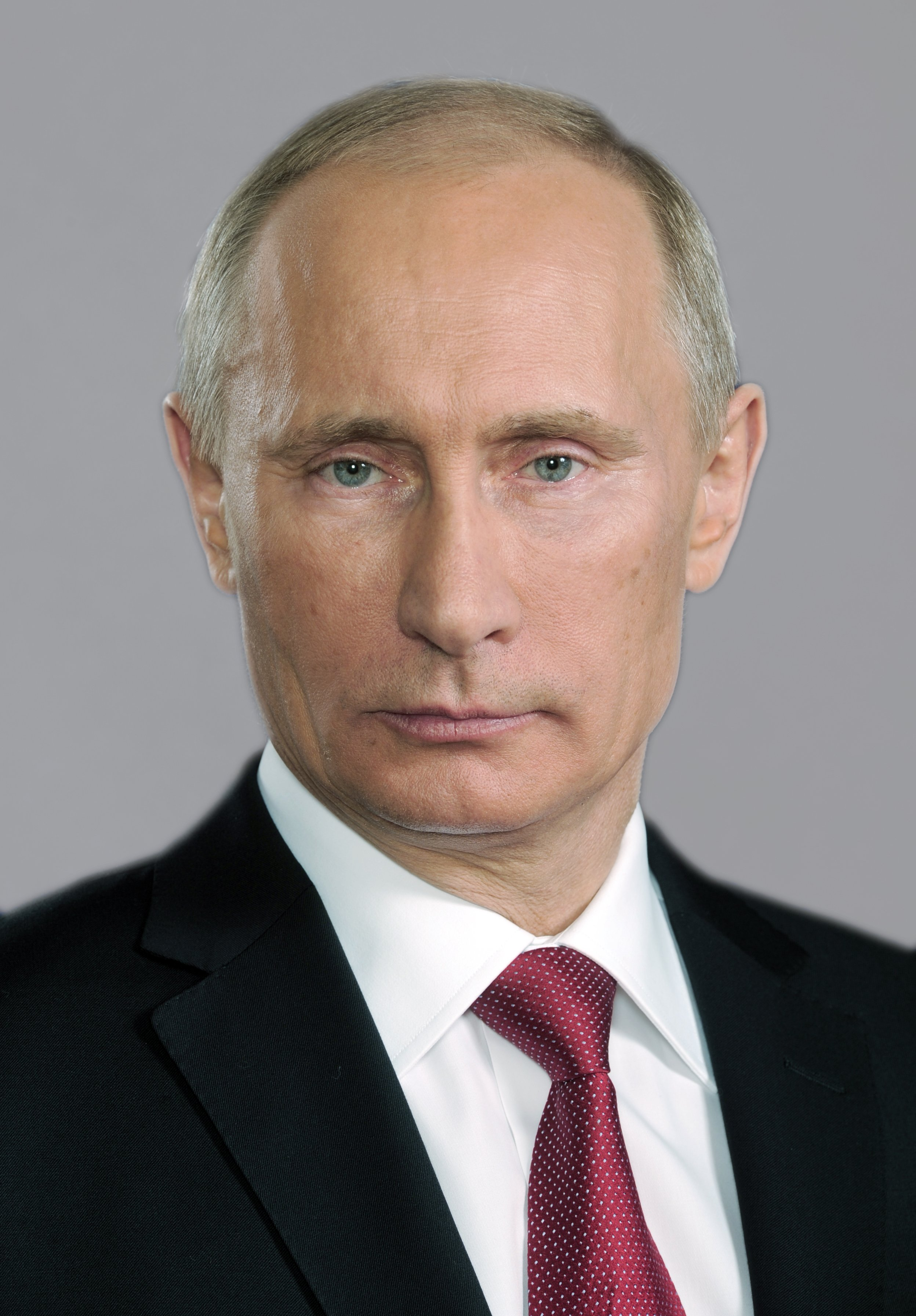
Vladimir Putin

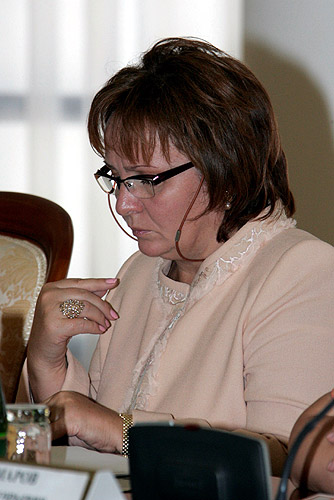
Lyudmila Putina

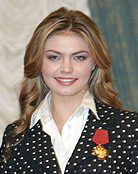
Alina Kabaeva

On 12 April 2008, the newspaper published an article which mentioned that Russian president Vladimir Putin had divorced his wife Lyudmila Putina and was to marry gymnast Alina Kabaeva in June 2008 at Konstantinov Palace in Saint Petersburg. The news spread and also got published in other magazines including Finnish tabloids Helsingin Sanomat and Ilta-Sanomat. (Note: "Putinin suhdehuhua levittänyt lehti suljettiin" [Putin suhdehuhua spread the Journal closed] (in Finnish). iltasanomat.fi. 19 April 2008.) After the news was published, both Putin and Kabaeva declined the claim and Kabaeva asked the newspaper to publish a retraction else threaten for legal notice. Though the newspaper published a refutation, their offices were visited several times by Federal Security Service agents.

On Friday, 18 April 2008 however Radio Free Europe published a slightly different version of the events by describing them this way: "Another tabloid, the website skandali.ru, has added to the intrigue by reporting that Federal Security Service (FSB) officers raided the offices of "Moskovsky Korrespondent" following the controversial piece. They allegedly questioned all the journalists who had a hand in the article and detained [editor in chief] Nekhoroshev—a claim Nekhoroshev himself has rejected, saying the FSB officers were in reality a group of friends who had come to pick him up from the office."

On 19 April 2008, the newspaper was shut down by Artem Artemov, general director of the paper's parent company. Artemov commented on the decision to the Interfax news agency: "I took the decision to cease financing and therefore [cease] printing the newspaper, in connection with the large expense of publishing it, and also disagreement with editorial staff over its strategy." Artemov added that Moskovsky Korrespondent's lead editor, Grigory Nekhoroshev, had resigned.

But Grigory Nekhoroshev defended his strategy and the article by saying that reporters had spent weeks checking the facts and that the public had a right to know everything—whether true or false—about their president. He added "I am 100 percent convinced that people should know this information about leaders. They should be aware even of rumors so that a public discussion can take place."

The owner Lebedev asked the newspaper editors to provide the source for the claim or apologize. Nekhoroshev's resignation was noted as the "perils of invoking Kremlin displeasure". The paper later admitted that there was no factual basis for its claim, however Nekhoroshev reported that he has "full faith in correspondents." The suspension of the newspaper was also believed to be influenced by Kremlin and Putin. Lebedev also labelled the story as a "personal vendetta" to discredit him.

On 18 June 2008, a number of media reported that the publication of Moskovsky Korrespondent was to resume in September 2008. Later, the newspaper was relaunched on 1 September 2008 and Akram Murtazaev, a former journalist of Novaya Gazeta, another newspaper by Lebedev, was appointed as a new editor-in-chief. However, the circulation was found to be less compared to its initial launch in 2008. In spite of the relaunch, the newspaper did not survive for longer period and was shut down on 29 October 2008 and merged with New Media; its investor reported that "it was a failed experiment with the resumption of the newspaper from both a financial and an artistic point of view".
