= Château Gütsch =

Château in Lucerne, Switzerland

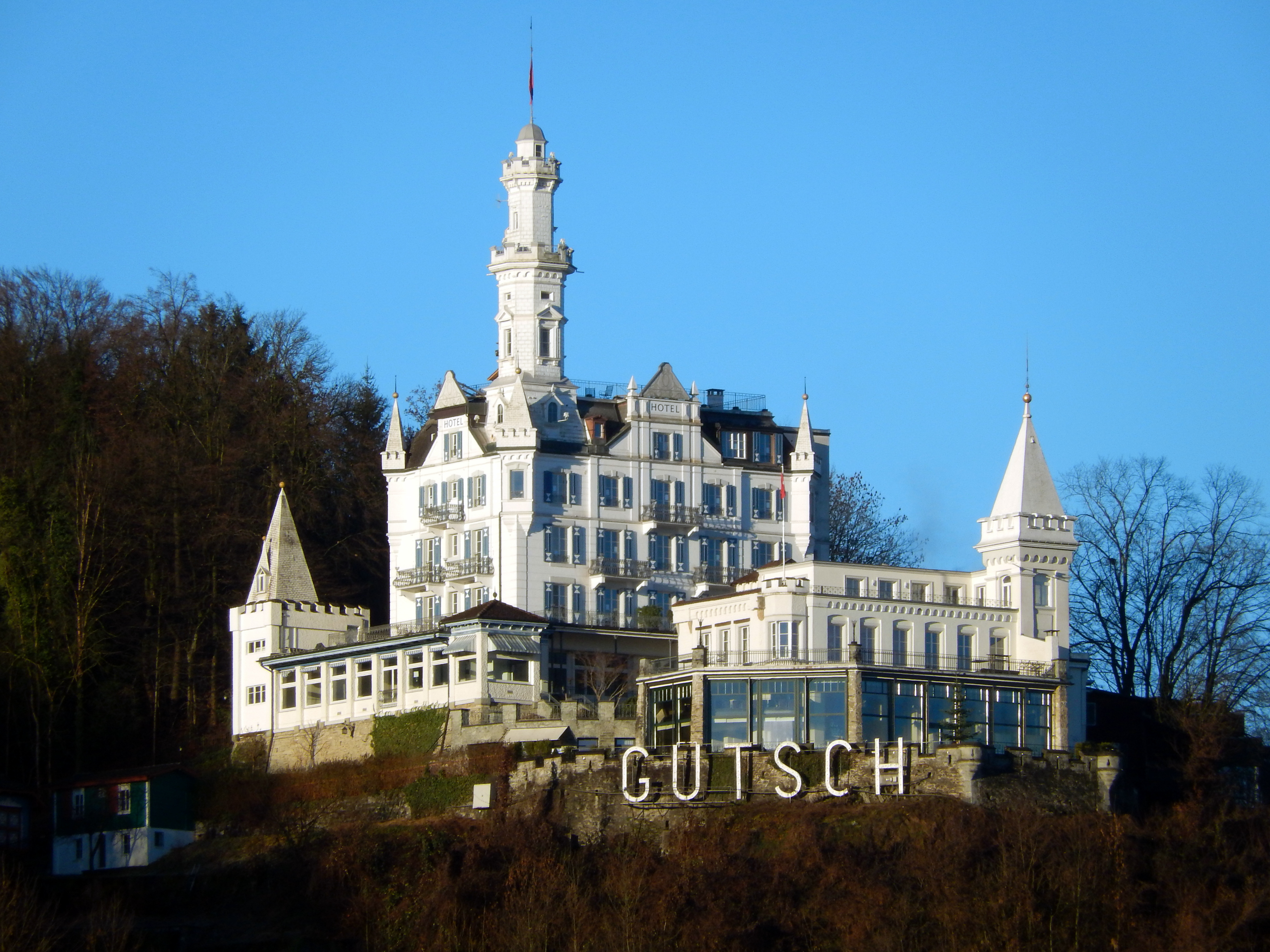

General information
- Location: Lucerne, Switzerland
- Coordinates: 47.0515°N 8.2950°E
- Completed: 16th century

Château Gütsch is a historic hotel complex in Lucerne, Switzerland, built in 1888 in the style of a fairy-tale castle.

== History ==
In 1859, Burkhard Pfyffer bought a plot of land on the Gütsch hill from the town and was granted the right to run an inn. The inn was then bought by Ignaz Businger in 1879 and expanded into a hotel. Like many hotels of the Belle Époque, the Château Gütsch was sited on a vantage point above lakes, rivers, and cities, in this case overlooking the city of Lucerne and the river Reuss. The present building was constructed in 1888 in a castle-like, romantic style.

A funicular railway, the Gütschbahn, was built in the late 19th century to connect Lucerne with the Gütsch hill.

A large part of the hotel was completely destroyed in the great fire of 1888. In 1901 the hotel received its present appearance, being modelled after Neuschwanstein in Bavaria.

The current owner is Kirill Androsov, who acquired the property after subsequent ownership changes.

=== Renovations ===
Following several changes in ownership, the hotel was renovated by Château Gütsch Immobilien AG, owned by Alexander Lebedev, and reopened in 2014 after a prolonged period of closure. As part of the renovation, the restaurant, bar, salons, and hotel rooms were refurbished. The hotel has 27 rooms, many of which offer views over the city of Lucerne, Lake Lucerne, and the surrounding mountains, and employed around 30 staff members at the time of reopening. At that time, the Gütsch funicular remained closed pending a funding decision by the city of Lucerne.

== See also ==
- List of castles and fortresses in Switzerland
- List of hotels in Switzerland
- Tourism in Switzerland
