= Gütsch Funicular =

Funicular in Lucerne, Switzerland

Coordinates: 47.051631°N 8.296051°E

Gütschbahn
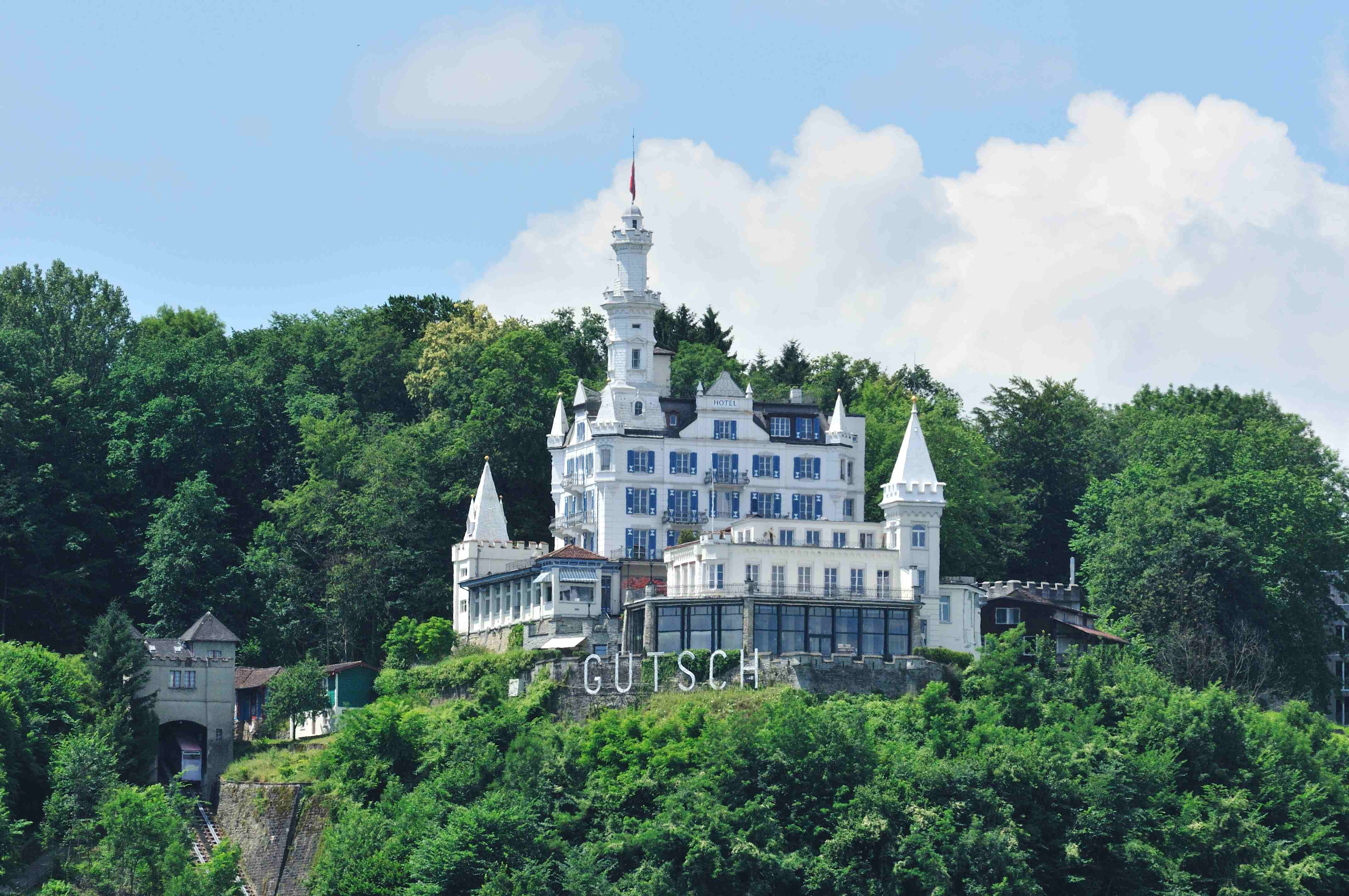
- upper station and hotel (2012)

Overview
- Other name: Drahtseilbahn Gütsch
- Status: In operation
- Locale: Lucerne, Switzerland
- Termini: "Luzern, Gütsch" at Baselstrasse 21a; "Luzern, Château Gütsch"
- Stations: 2
- Website: chateau-guetsch.ch

Service
- Type: Funicular
- Operator(s): Verkehrsbetriebe Luzern
- Rolling stock: 2

History
- Opened: 22 August 1884 (141 years ago)
- Extension: 1897
- Operations suspended: 21 April 2008
- Reopened after new installation: 26 September 2015

Technical
- Line length: 170 m (560 ft)
- Number of tracks: 2
- Track gauge: 1,000 mm (3 ft 3 3/8 in)
- Electrification: 1961 (water counterbalancing before)
- Highest elevation: 519 m (1,703 ft)

The Gütsch Funicular, also known as the Drahtseilbahn Gütsch (DBG) or simply the Gütschbahn, is a funicular railway in the city of Lucerne in the Swiss canton of Lucerne. The line links a lower station located on Baselstrasse, some 1 kilometre (0.62 mi) west of the centre of the city, with an upper station adjacent to the Château Gütsch hotel, 90 m above.

== History ==
The Château Gütsch was constructed between 1881 and 1883 on a site overlooking the city of Lucerne and modelled on the architecture of Neuschwanstein Castle in Bavaria. To provide a direct connection between the hotel and the city, a concession application was submitted on 3 March 1884, and the water-powered Gütschbahn funicular was opened on 22 August 1884.

In January 1895, the Gütschbahn-Gesellschaft was founded to operate the line. The company later underwent several ownership changes before entering bankruptcy in 2006. Following a foreclosure auction in 2007, UBS acquired the funicular together with the hotel; operations were subsequently suspended on 21 April 2008. After rebuilding, the line reopened on 26 September 2015.

Since its reopening in 2015, the Gütschbahn has been owned by Château Gütsch AG and operated under a private-law agreement with the City of Lucerne to ensure public transport access to the Gütsch area. As part of the 2014–2015 refurbishment, the city contributed CHF 1.73 million in public funding, approved by a municipal referendum on 30 November 2014.

== Operations ==
In its current guise the line is operated by Verkehrsbetriebe Luzern, the city's transport operator, and is integrated into zone 10 of the city's integrated fare system. It has the following parameters:

Feature	Value
Number of stops	2
Configuration	Twin track
Mode of operation	Automatic
Track length	170 metres (558 ft)
Rise	90 metres (300 ft)
Track gauge	1,000 mm (3 ft 3 3/8 in)
Number of cars	2
Capacity	8 passengers per car
Travel time	1.5 minutes

== See also ==
- List of funicular railways

== Gallery ==
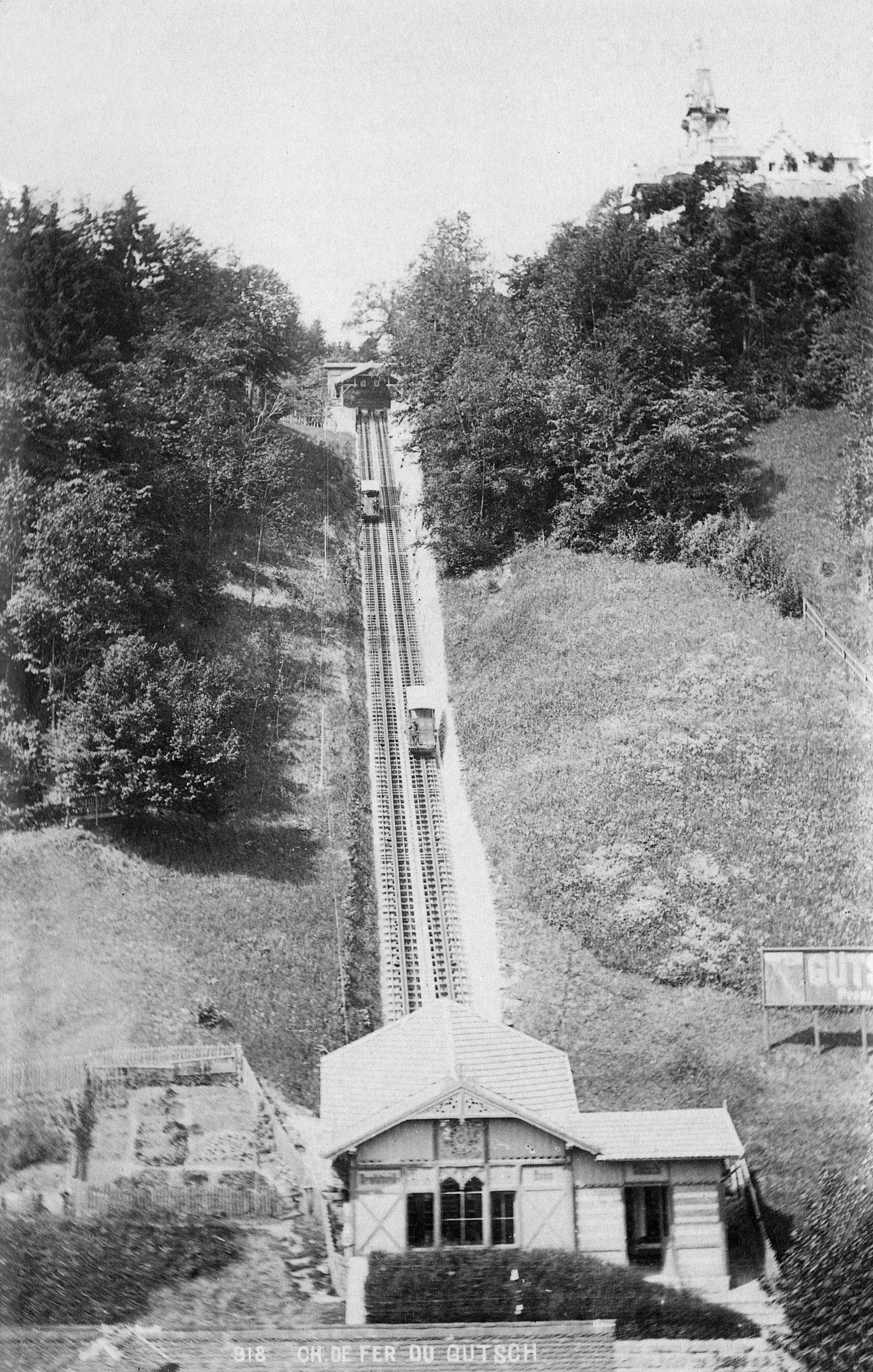
early image of the funicular (ca. 1885)

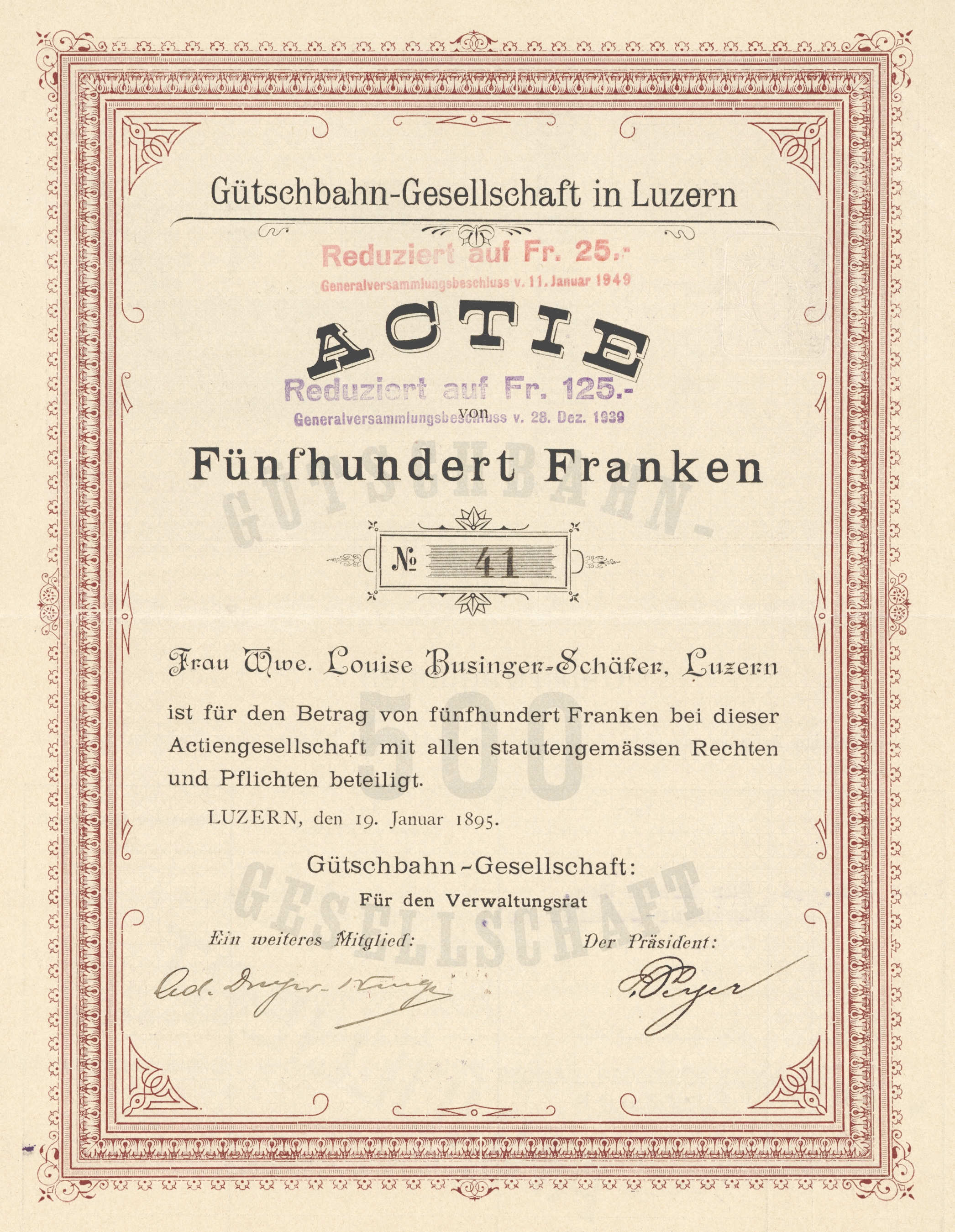
Share certificate of the Gütschbahn-Gesellschaft (founded 1895, wound-up 2007), issued 19. January 1895

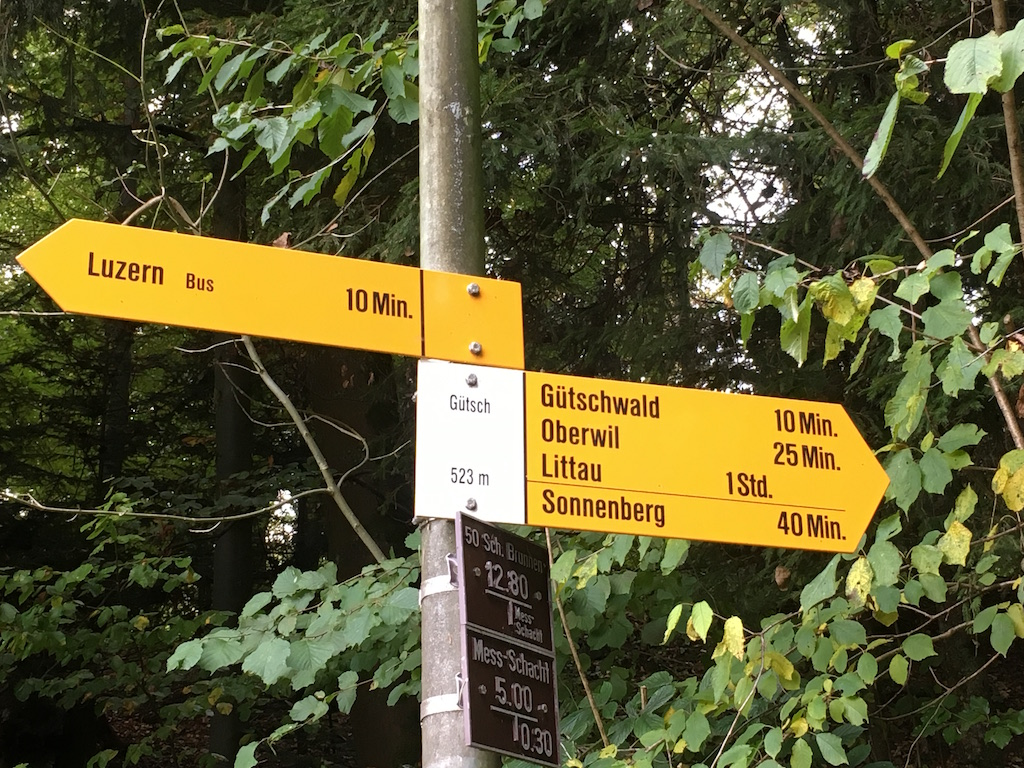
hiking destination from upper station: Luzern, Gütschwald, Oberwil, Littau, Sonnenberg

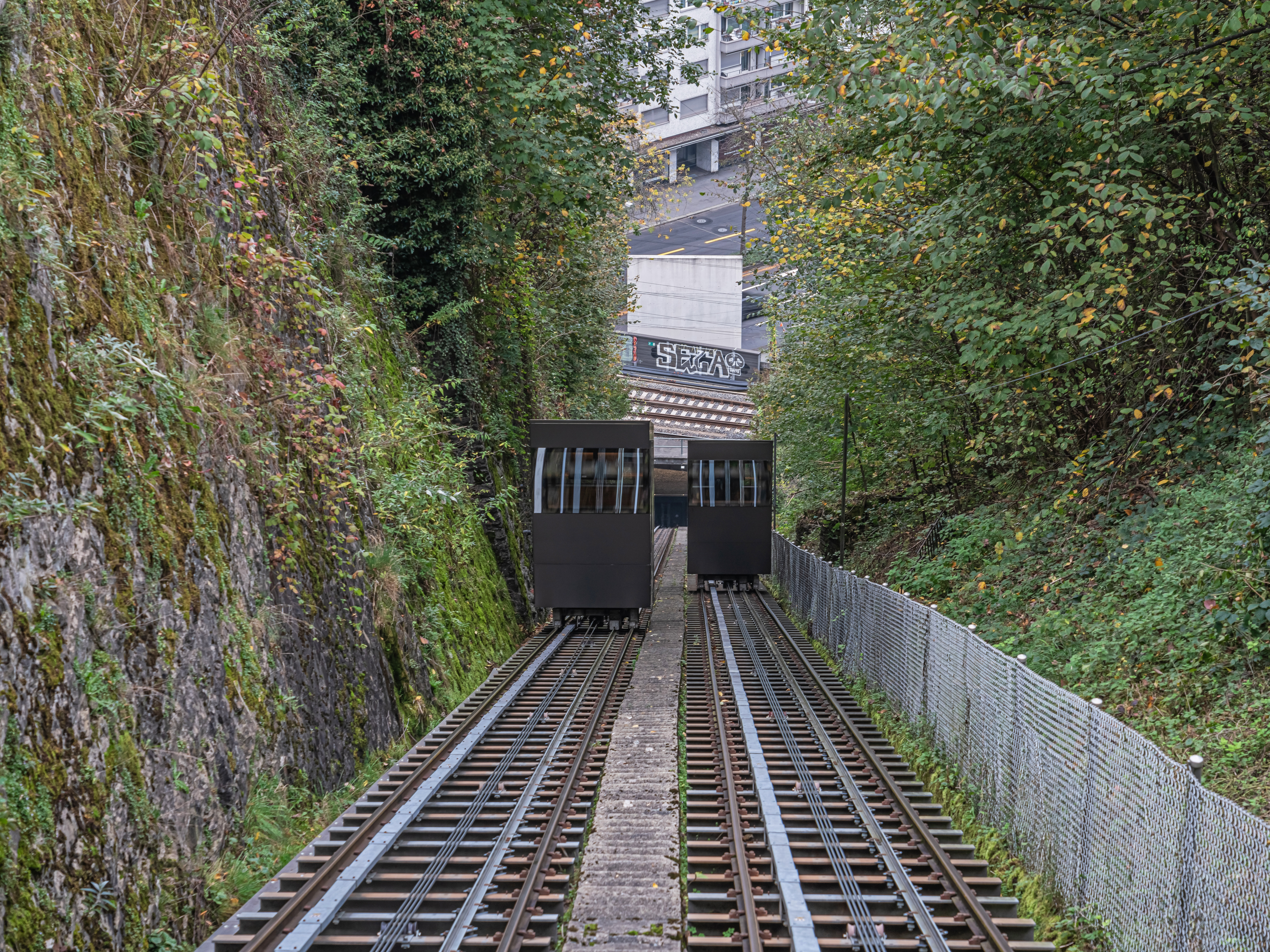
View from upper station
