= Personal fiduciary services =

Personal fiduciary services are fiduciary services provided by a financial institutions or advisors to an individual or family that are typically wealthy or high net worth individual. They are often referred to as private trust, private client, private wealth management, or private banking services in the United States.

These services are provided by a person or firm – such as a bank, trust company or registered investment adviser (RIA) — serving as a trustee, executor, personal administrator or discretionary agent having direct responsibility for managing assets for or on behalf of individuals and families, as well as estates, trusts, private foundations and other entities they establish or control. Providers of these services ("personal fiduciaries") also may serve as a trust protector or non-discretionary advisor having an indirect impact on the management of such assets. In contrast, institutional fiduciary services involve managing assets for or on behalf of public corporations, government entities, employee retirement plans and other institutional investors.

== Standards ==
Personal fiduciaries are held to standards of performance that vary depending on their actual role. These performance standards may be defined by common law, statutes, rules and regulations, or specifically by contracts, trust agreements or wills. Increasingly in the US, the prudent investor rule, in place of the long-standing prudent man rule, is viewed as the standard of performance for the management of assets by a personal fiduciary. This performance standard shares some characteristics with, but differs in several material respects from, the Employee Retirement Income Security Act, which is applicable to most US employee retirement plans.

Regardless of their role, personal fiduciaries are required to understand the personal characteristics of the owners or beneficiaries of the assets entrusted to their care so that they can apply the relevant standards of performance in a manner that is in the best interests of those owners or beneficiaries. It is this "personalization of application" that most clearly distinguishes personal fiduciaries from institutional fiduciaries.

== Government ==
When personal fiduciary services are provided by a US state or federally chartered bank, they are regulated by state and federal agencies, including the FDIC, the Federal Reserve and the Office of the Comptroller of the Currency (OCC). When these services are provided by an RIA, they are subject to a fiduciary standard of care laid out in the US Investment Advisers Act of 1940, as amended by the Dodd-Frank Wall Street Reform and Consumer Protection Act ("Dodd-Frank Act"), and related rules issued by the Securities and Exchange Commission. On June 22, 2011, as directed by the Dodd-Frank Act in response to its elimination of the "private adviser exemption", the SEC adopted a new rule defining "family offices" that are excluded from the definition of an investment adviser under the US Investment Advisers Act of 1940. The SEC Release containing this new rule discusses personal fiduciary services that are provided by family offices and the rationale for excluding certain family offices from registration as an RIA.

== Broker dealers ==
Broker-dealers in the US serving retail customers are subject to Regulation Best Interest: The Broker-Dealer Standard of Conduct ("Reg BI"), which became effective in June 2020. Reg BI established a new standard of conduct for broker-dealers when making a recommendation of a securities transaction or an investment strategy involving securities to a retail customer. It requires them to act in the "best interest" of the customer when making such recommendations by complying with disclosure, care obligation, conflict of interest and compliance obligations. Key elements of this best interest standard are similar to those of the fiduciary standard of conduct applicable to investment advisers under the 1940 Act, but the SEC deliberately refrained from using the term "fiduciary" to describe the broker-dealer version of the best interest standard. Reg BI has been criticized as confusing investors or giving them a false assurance that brokers are required to serve their best interests in the same manner investment advisers are required to serve them.
