= Alexander Lebedev =

Russian businessman (born 1959)

- Александр Лебедев
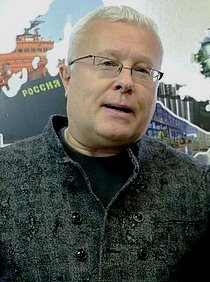
- Lebedev in 2019
- Born: 16 December 1959 (age 66); Moscow, Soviet Union
- Education: Moscow State Institute of International Relations
- Occupation: Businessman
- Known for: Former KGB officer
- Spouse: Natalia Sokolova (sep. 1998)
- Partner: Elena Perminova (2005–2024)
- Children: 5, including Evgeny
- Lebedev's voice Recorded March 2013

Alexander Yevgenievich Lebedev (Note: In this name that follows East Slavic naming customs, the patronymic is Yevgenievich and the family name is Lebedev.) (Russian: Александр Евгеньевич Лебедев, IPA: [ɐlʲɪˈksandr jɪvˈɡʲenʲjɪvʲɪtɕ ˈlʲebʲɪdʲɪf]; born 16 December 1959) is a Russian businessman, and has been referred to as one of the Russian oligarchs. Until 1992, he was an officer in the First Chief Directorate (Foreign Intelligence) of the Soviet Union′s KGB and later one of the KGB's successor-agencies, Russia's Foreign Intelligence Service (SVR).

In early 2008, he was listed as the 39th richest Russian, and worth an estimated US$3.1 billion by Forbes magazine, but by October 2008 he was worth $300 million. In March 2012, Forbes estimated his fortune at US$1.1 billion. His fortune has since declined, and he is no longer considered to be a billionaire. He is part owner of the Russian newspaper Novaya Gazeta and owner of two UK newspapers with his son Evgeny Lebedev: the Evening Standard and The Independent.

In May 2022, Lebedev was put on Canada's sanctions list following the 2022 Russian invasion of Ukraine. He was separately reported to have met Vyacheslav Dukhin, a senior Russian government official, weeks before the invasion.

== Early life and education ==
Lebedev was born in Moscow. His parents were part of the Moscow intelligentsia. His father, Yevgeny Nikolaevich Lebedev, was an elite athlete: a member of the Soviet national water polo team, and later a professor at the Bauman Moscow State Technical University, Moscow's highest technical school. After graduating from Moscow Pedagogic Institute, Lebedev's mother, Maria Sergeyevna, worked in a rural Sakhalin school and later taught English in a Moscow tertiary school.

In 1977, Lebedev entered the Department of Economics at Moscow State Institute of International Relations. After he graduated in 1982, Lebedev began working at the Institute of Economics of the World Socialist System doing research for his Kandidat (between master's degree and doctorate) dissertation, The problems of debt and the challenges of globalization.

== Career in the intelligence services ==
Lebedev transferred to the First Chief Directorate (Foreign Intelligence) of the KGB. According to The Sunday Times, as a KGB scout, he was based at the Soviet embassy in London from 1988, bringing his son, Evgeny Lebedev, with him. At the embassy, he worked on economic issues with Andrey Kostin who was also at the embassy until 1990. He worked for the KGB's successor, the Foreign Intelligence Service, until 1992.

According to a report presented by the Italian External Intelligence and Security Agency to the parliamentary oversight committee (Copasir), Lebedev's resignation from the FSB might have been fictitious and he "continued to participate in annual KGB meetings". Moreover, "He would have started his business activity while still in the service of the KGB and using the funds he had acquired as an agent", the report noted.

== Business career ==
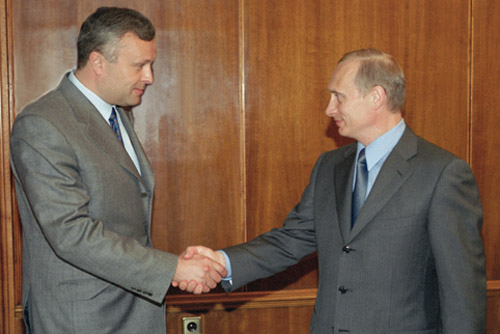
Lebedev with Russian President Vladimir Putin on 7 May 2002

Upon leaving the Russian intelligence community, Lebedev set up his first company, the Russian Investment-Finance Company. In 1995 this bought the National Reserve Bank, a small Russian bank which was in trouble at the time. The bank subsequently grew rapidly to become one of Russia's largest banks. Among the bank's assets were:

- 11% of the main Russian national airline Aeroflot
- 44% of the Ilyushin Finance Co, that owns a significant share of Russian aircraft-building industry
- significant parts of Sberbank, Gazprom, RAO UES

The bank is the core of the group of companies holding National Reserve Corporation, that according to Lebedev's personal site owns around US$2 billion of assets. In March 2006, Forbes estimates Lebedev's fortune as high as US$3.5 billion, but as of July 2013 he dropped out of the billionaires list and is no longer a billionaire.

The National Reserve Corporation included the National Land Company (the biggest potato producer in Russia), National Housing Corporation (construction of affordable houses), National Mortgage Company (Национальная Ипотечная Компания), as well as interests in textiles, telecommunications, trams and trolleybuses, electrical power, chemical and tourist industries owning a large hotel network in Crimea and plan to create the National Reserve Park that would manage diverse tourist enterprises in Russia, Ukraine and France.

Lebedev used to own the Moskovski Korrespondent, but according to Channel 4's Dispatches programme, Lebedev closed it down for publishing an article about Vladimir Putin having an affair with Alina Kabayeva.

On 21 January 2009, Lebedev and his company Evening Press Corporation, part of Lebedev Holdings, bought approximately a 75.1% of share in the Evening Standard newspaper for £1. The previous owners, the Daily Mail and General Trust, continue to hold 24.9% in the company in the new firm, named Evening Standard Ltd. Lebedev promised not to interfere with the editorial running of the paper. Lebedev commented that during his time as a spy in London, he used the Evening Standard to find information. Paul Dacre, the editor-in-chief of the Evening Standard at the time of the sale said: "It's a very sad day for the paper, it's a very sad day for the Rothermeres. We are very sorry that it leaked out, we had no control over that. Everyone's been working very hard and there's a lot of hope for the future of the Evening Standard."

In 2009, he entered into exclusive negotiations with Independent News & Media to buy the company's British national newspapers, The Independent and The Independent on Sunday. Before the purchase was completed, his representatives offered the editorship of The Independent to Rod Liddle. The offer was withdrawn after Liddle's putative appointment was opposed by the newspaper's staff and by an online campaign. On 25 March 2010, Lebedev bought The Independent and Independent on Sunday for £1.

In 2012, National Reserve Bank (NRB) faced difficulties: corporate deposits decreased by 2.2 billion rubles, retail deposits by 1.2 billion rubles. 20% of the bank's liabilities had run off by the end of January 2012. In March 2012, two top managers left the bank.

On 5 November 2012, Lebedev announced he would close all the regional offices of the National Reserve Bank and sell off the real estate as well as 75% of the bank's loan portfolio, worth 16.8 billion rubles (US$542 million). Also in November 2012, Lebedev announced that he was selling off his assets in Russia.

In 2019, Lebedev invested in the Emperium shipbuilding project, which produces electric-powered passenger ships. The first vessel, the Ekovolt catamaran, was launched in Saint Petersburg in June 2020.

In 2021, Lebedev launched a project in the industry of decentralized finance, a cryptocurrency platform branded "Independent Decentralized Finance SmartBank & Ecosystem" (InDeFi SmartBank). On 14 August 2025 InDeFi SmartBank placed on the OFAC (US Department of the Treasury's Office of Foreign Assets Control) Specially Designated Nationals (SDN) list.

== Legal ==
In September 2011, while appearing on a Russian television programme, he punched a fellow guest, billionaire property developer Sergei Polonsky. Lebedev said afterwards that he had reacted to Polonsky's threat of violence towards him. Lebedev was later charged with disorderly conduct and sentenced to community service for that incident.

== Political career ==
In 2003, Lebedev stood as a candidate for elections to the Mayoralty of Moscow and the State Duma. He received 13% in the Mayoral elections, losing to Yuriy Luzhkov, but won a seat in the State Duma on the Rodina party list (he was actually number one on the Moscow regional list of the party). He remained in the Duma until 2007, when new elections were held. In the Duma, he initially moved from nationalist Rodina to the pro-Government United Russia faction, but after Rodina was merged into the larger social-democratic coalition Fair Russia, he made his return.

Lebedev was formerly the Vice Chairman of Duma's committee on the Commonwealth of Independent States, the coordinator of Duma's group on interactions with Verkhovna Rada of Ukraine, and the coordinator of the State Duma group dealing with the city.

Lebedev, together with the former President of the Soviet Union, Mikhail Gorbachev, was a co-owner of Novaya Gazeta, one of the most vocal newspapers critical of the current Russian Government.

Lebedev is a founder and the President of the National Investment Council, a non-political and non-government organization working to improve the investment sentiments in Russia, protecting interests of the Russian business abroad, and fighting the negative sentiments towards Russian business.

In September 2008, Russian politician Mikhail Gorbachev announced he was going to make a comeback to Russian politics along with Lebedev. Their party was called the Independent Democratic Party of Russia.

In March 2009, Lebedev announced that he would be running for mayor of Sochi, host of the 2014 Winter Olympics, but a court ruling declared his candidacy invalid on 13 April 2009. The court ruling was a result of a complaint by another candidate, Vladimir Turukhanovsky, that Lebedev's campaign received three donations from minors that is forbidden by Russian electoral law. According to the chief of Lebedev's electoral campaign, Artyom Artyomov, the three teenagers were led to Sberbank by a staff member of the Sochi council, given 500 rubles each (approximately $20), and told to donate the money to Lebedev's campaign. His campaigners sent the money back the same day it was received but still it was found sufficient to disqualify his candidacy. Lebedev said that he intended to appeal against the court's decision.

Lebedev publicly supported the 2014 Russian annexation of Crimea. In 2017 he held a media symposium in his hotel complex in Alushta, Crimea (so he said) "to correct an impression of Crimea put out by a biased western media".

In April 2018 which was a month after the Salisbury chemical poisoning of former Russian agent Sergei Skripal, Lebedev's close friend Boris Johnson, as Foreign Secretary, met with Lebedev at Lebedev's Italian villa without Johnson's security detail. However, no minutes were made of their meeting.

In 2019, he published a book titled Hunt the Banker: The Confessions of a Russian Ex-Oligarch.

Lebedev was described by The New York Times as an oligarch as recently as 2020, when his son Evgeny was nominated for a life peerage by UK Prime Minister Boris Johnson.

== Charity ==
Lebedev has a long history of supporting culture and charity, and created an organization named Charitable Reserve Fund (Благотворительный Резервный Фонд, BRF) to bring order to these activities. Among the organizations and projects he (or BRF) have sponsored are:

- Center for Children's Hematology and Transplantology, named after Raisa Gorbachyova in Saint Petersburg (general sponsor of the construction)
- Burdenko Military Hospital
- State Russian Museum
- Fomenko Theater
- Moscow Art Theatre
- Lesya Ukrainka National Academic Theater of Russian Drama in Kyiv
- Mikhail Bulgakov Museum in Kyiv
- Restoration of the monument to Alexander Suvorov in Swiss Alps
- Monument Sorrow (Скорбящая) in London by sculptor Sergey Shcherbakov commemorating Soviet soldiers who died during World War II.

Lebedev was awarded the Saint Innokenty of Moscow Order by the Russian Orthodox Church and the Dialogue of Cultures medal by UNESCO.

== Sanctions ==
Canada sanctioned Lebedev on 8 July 2022 accusing him of being a pro-Russia disinformation agent after the Russian invasion of Ukraine.

== Personal life ==
Lebedev's first wife was Natalia Sokolova, daughter of the scientist Vladimir Sokolov, with whom he has one child, Evgeny Lebedev. They separated in 1998. Evgeny Lebedev has sat in the House of Lords as a crossbench life peer since 19 November 2020

Since 2005, Lebedev's partner has been Elena Perminova, a former model; some sources report they are married while others say they are engaged. They have four children together, three sons and a daughter.

Lebedev hosts social events, with guests including Mick Jagger, Eddie Izzard, Ian McKellen, Keira Knightley, Joan Collins and Ralph Fiennes, and the Mayor of London, Sadiq Khan, former British Prime Minister Boris Johnson and Russian foreign ministry spokesperson Maria Zakharova.

Lebedev owns the Palazzo Terranova in Ronti and the nearby Castello di Santa Eurasia near Monte Tezio in the countryside of Città di Castello in Perugia. The residences are available to rent and the Lebedevs have hosted numerous celebrities and politicians at the two properties. The properties were monitored by Italian intelligence agencies over concerns that they have been used for espionage purposes.
