= Wiederkehr =

Wiederkehr is a Swiss-German surname. Notable people with the surname include:

- Christoph Wiederkehr, Austrian politician
- Daniel Wiederkehr (born 1989), Swiss rower
- Gustav Wiederkehr (1905–1972), Swiss football administrator
- Josef Wiederkehr (born 1970), Swiss businessman and politician
- Johann Andreas Wiederkehr, Swiss-American winemaker

== See also ==
- Wiederkehr Village, Arkansas, a city in Franklin County, Arkansas, United States
