= Wohlen, Aargau =

Municipality in Aargau, Switzerland

Wohlen
- Municipality
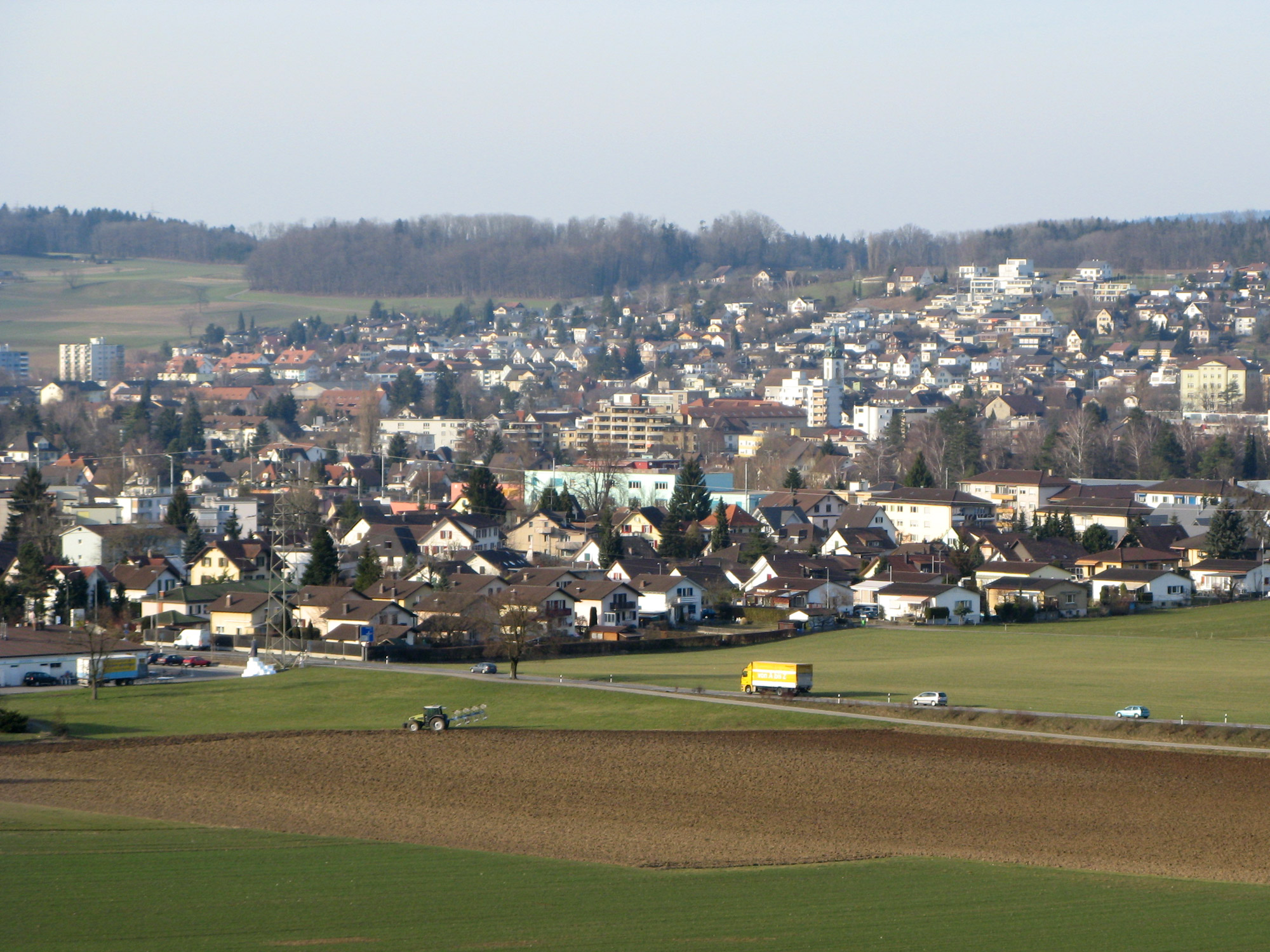

- Flag Coat of arms
- Location of Wohlen
- Location within Switzerland Location within Canton of Aargau
- Coordinates: 47°21′N 8°17′E
- Country: Switzerland
- Canton: Aargau
- District: Bremgarten

Area
  - Total: 12.48 km^{2} (4.82 sq mi)
- Elevation: 421 m (1,381 ft)

Population (December 2020)
  - Total: 16,881
  - Density: 1,353/km^{2} (3,503/sq mi)
- Time zone: UTC+01:00 (CET)
  - Summer (DST): UTC+02:00 (CEST)
- Postal code: 5610
- SFOS number: 4082
- ISO 3166 code: CH-AG
- Surrounded by: Bremgarten, Büttikon, Dottikon, Fischbach-Göslikon, Hägglingen, Niederwil, Villmergen, Waltenschwil
- Twin towns: Lermoos (Austria)
- Website: wohlen.ch

Wohlen (High Alemannic: Woole) is a municipality in the district of Bremgarten in the canton of Aargau in Switzerland.

== History ==
Aerial view (1953)

The earliest known settlements in Wohlen date from the late Hallstatt era (600-500 BC). This settlement left two clusters of burial mounds in Hohbühl and Häslerhau. While the graves were discovered and excavated in 1925–1930, the location of the settlement is still unknown. During the Roman era two large estates were built at Oberdorf and the Brünishalde. Both estates date from about 50 AD and supported a number of fields. The harvested grain was probably for the maintenance of the Roman troops at the military camp Vindonissa. Of the estates all that remains is masonry, tile, mosaic pieces and coins, as well as some foundations at Häslerhau.

During the migration of the Alemanni in the 5th century into the area, they built their own settlements to the right of the Bünz in Chappele, Steingasse, Kirche and along the upper main street as well as along the left bank of the Bünz in Wil. The local gallic population merged slowly with the Germanic Alemanni. With the migration of the Germanic tribe, the place name became Wohlen. The name is first mentioned in 1178/79 as Vuolon / Volen, and goes back to the Old High German Walh, which means Vlachs or romanus, a term for the romanized locals. So, the Alemannic name of Vuolon / Volen referred to the earlier inhabitants.

One of the reasons for the slow integration of the two populations was the lack of an ecclesiastical center. Wohlen had no parish church, but was split between three parishes, Niederwil, Göslikon and Villmergen. Shortly after 1100, an ancestor of the Lords of Volen donated a small church to the village. This church served until 1518 but didn't include the whole population. The lords of Volen (1185–1425) were the largest landowners in the village and the only local family who made the leap from the peasantry into the Habsburg military nobility. Even among the general population, there were "rich" with more fields, meadows, and cattle and the poor who worked on the neighbor's fields.

In the wake of the Black Plague in 1350, refugees from surrounding areas settled in plague emptied farmhouses in Wohlen, leading to an end of the separate populations in the village. After 1500, the population began to grow again. The number of households climbed from 48 to 60 (1540–1570), i.e., about 240 to 300 people. Starting in 1635, there are church records, so the population is known. These records start just as the last large plague hit the city in the autumn and winter of 1635/36, killing approximately one quarter of the people. The population increased slowly until about 1800, as the local economy could not support rapid growth. However, in 1800 Wohlen had a larger population than either Bremgarten or Villmergen (1397 inhabitants against Bremgarten 599; Villmergen 888). After 1800, with new income opportunities, Wohlen increased its population steadily: 1800 to 1890 by 87%, from 1890 to 1950 it increased 154% and from 1950 to 2004 by 109%.

In 1830, it was the site of a meeting to attempt to reform the cantonal constitution. Following a disagreement on whether to use force or diplomacy to get the government to reform, Johann Heinrich Fischer left Wohlen for Merenschwand to raise a rebel militia. Two days later, the militia assembled near Wohlen and marched on Aarau. Following a bloodless invasion of Aarau, known as the Freiämtersturm, the government agreed to every demand of the rebels.

== Geography ==
Wohlen has an area, as of 2006, of 12.5 square kilometers (4.8 sq mi). Of this area, 39.5% is used for agricultural purposes, while 27.9% is forested. Of the rest of the land, 32.1% is settled (buildings or roads) and the remainder (0.6%) is non-productive (rivers or lakes).

== Coat of arms ==
The blazon of the municipal coat of arms is Argent a Pile inverted Sable and a Chief Gules.

== Demographics ==
Wohlen has a population (as of 31 December 2020) of 16,881. As of 2008, 33.3% of the population was made up of foreign nationals. Over the last 10 years (1997–2007) the population has changed at a rate of 9.4%. Most of the population (as of 2000) speaks German (79.8%), with Italian being second most common ( 8.1%) and Albanian being third (3.1%).

The age distribution, as of 2008, in Wohlen is; 1,424 children or 10.0% of the population are between 0 and 9 years old and 1,802 teenagers or 12.7% are between 10 and 19. Of the adult population, 1,870 people or 13.2% of the population are between 20 and 29 years old. 1,742 people or 12.3% are between 30 and 39, 2,380 people or 16.8% are between 40 and 49, and 1,857 people or 13.1% are between 50 and 59. The senior population distribution is 1,521 people or 10.7% of the population are between 60 and 69 years old, 1,045 people or 7.4% are between 70 and 79, there are 482 people or 3.4% who are between 80 and 89, and there are 77 people or 0.5% who are 90 and older.

As of 2000, there were 662 homes with 1 or 2 persons in the household, 2,822 homes with 3 or 4 persons in the household, and 1,849 homes with 5 or more persons in the household. The average number of people per household was 2.36 individuals. In 2008 there were 2,080 single family homes (or 32.6% of the total) out of a total of 6,381 homes and apartments. There were a total of 114 empty apartments for a 1.8% vacancy rate. As of 2007, the construction rate of new housing units was 5.2 new units per 1000 residents.

In the 2007 federal election the most popular party was the SVP which received 37.9% of the vote. The next three most popular parties were the SP (16.9%), the CVP (16.8%) and the FDP (12.4%).

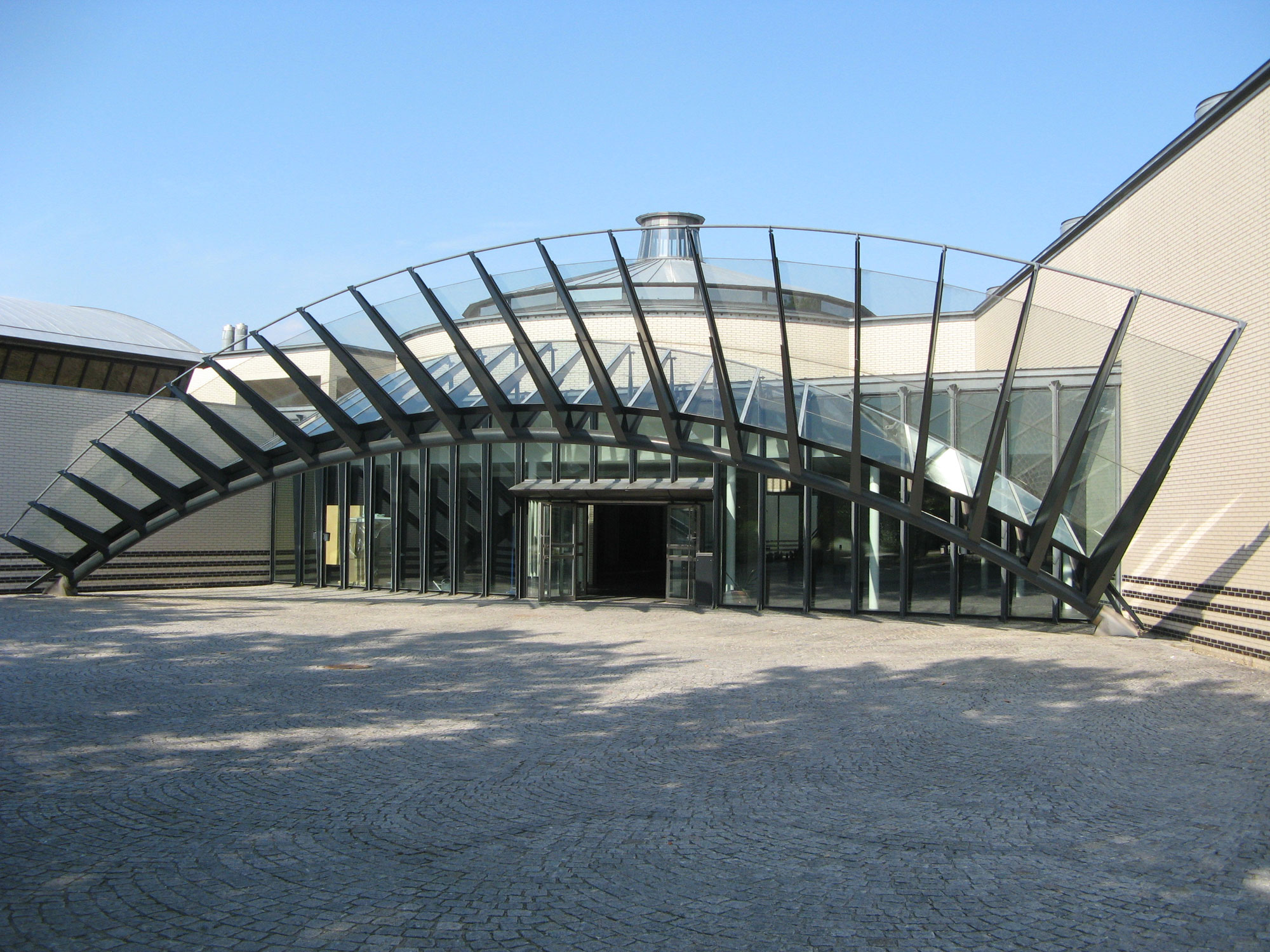
Cantonal School in Wohlen

In Wohlen about 59.5% of the population (between age 25 and 64) have completed either non-mandatory upper secondary education or additional higher education (either university or a Fachhochschule). Of the school age population (in the 2008/2009 school year), there are 1,116 students attending primary school, there are 531 students attending secondary school, there are 413 students attending tertiary or university level schooling, and there are 30 students who are seeking a job after school in the municipality.

The historical population is given in the following table:

Historical population
Year	Pop.	±%
1800	1,397	—
1975	11,837	+747.3%
1980	11,826	−0.1%
1990	12,480	+5.5%
2000	13,268	+6.3%

== Heritage sites of national significance ==
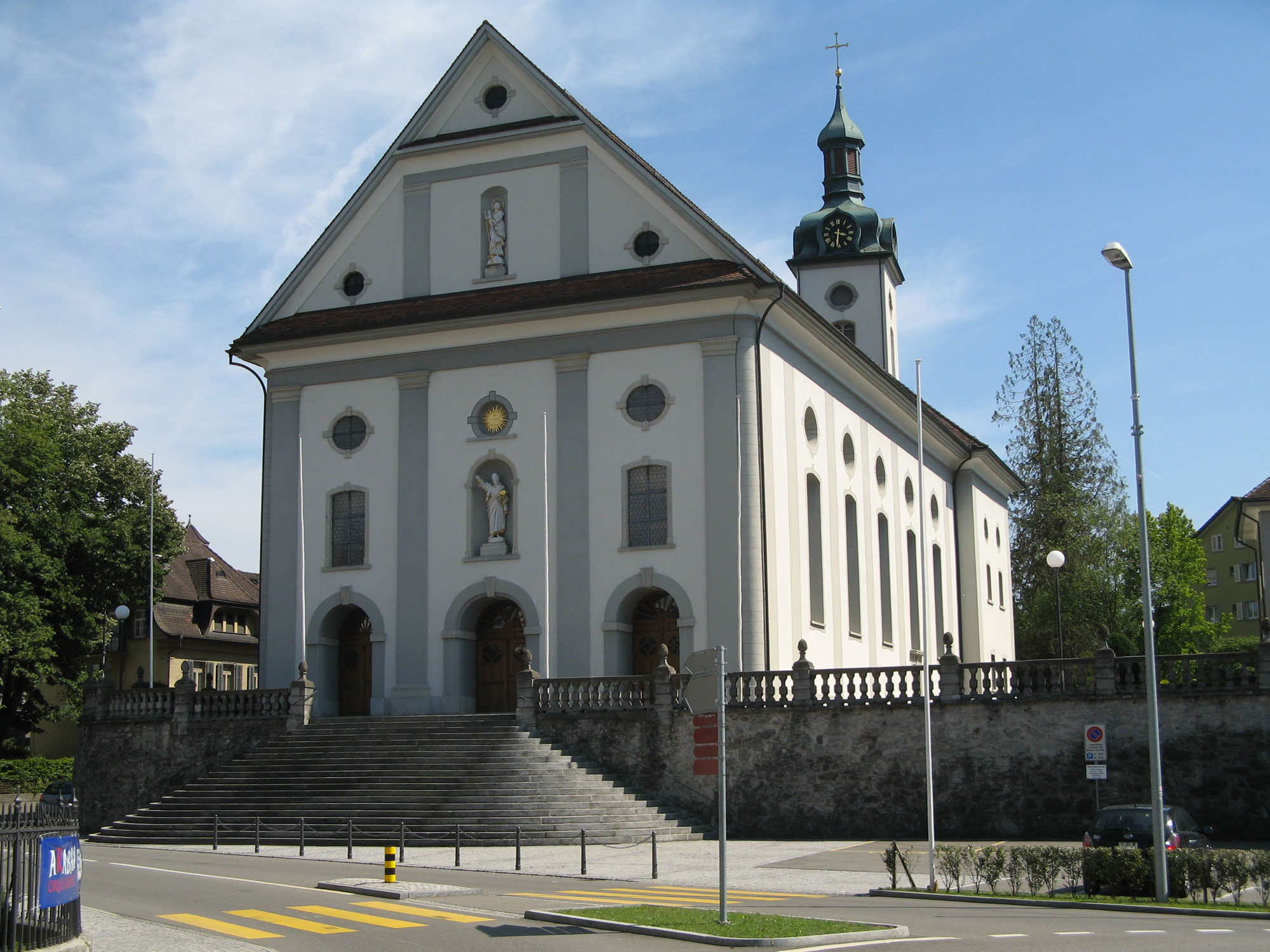
Parish church of Wohlen

The Häslerhau and Hohbüehl (two separate groups of Iron Age burial mounds) and the Catholic Church of St. Leonhard are listed as Swiss heritage sites of national significance. At the burial mounds, graves of men, women and children were found. The men were buried with spears, the women with rich ornaments and its wide variety bronze vessels, including a rare accumulation of large vessels, which indicates a considerable wealth of the people buried here.

== Economy ==
As of 2007, Wohlen had an unemployment rate of 3.7%. As of 2005, there were 94 people employed in the primary economic sector and about 27 businesses involved in this sector. 1,801 people are employed in the secondary sector and there are 148 businesses in this sector. 3,846 people are employed in the tertiary sector, with 559 businesses in this sector.

As of 2000 there was a total of 6,857 workers who lived in the municipality. Of these, 4,244 or about 61.9% of the residents worked outside Wohlen while 3,375 people commuted into the municipality for work. There were a total of 5,988 jobs (of at least 6 hours per week) in the municipality. Of the working population, 12.1% used public transportation to get to work, and 51.3% used a private car.

== Transportation ==
Wohlen is served by three railway stations. The main station is Wohlen railway station, which is located on the Aargauische Südbahn, a railway line that links Lenzburg and Rotkreuz, and is the terminus of the Bremgarten–Dietikon line, from Bremgarten and Dietikon. It is served by the S26 service of Aargau S-Bahn and the S42 peak-hour service of Zurich S-Bahn, both running on the Aargauische Südbahn, and service S17 of the Zurich S-Bahn, on the Bremgarten–Dietikon line, with both operating two trains per hour. The other two stations, Wohlen Oberdorf and Erdmannlistein, are minor stopping points on the S17.

== Religion ==
From the 2000 census, 7,531 or 56.5% were Roman Catholic, while 2,626 or 19.7% belonged to the Swiss Reformed Church. Of the rest of the population, there were 14 individuals (or about 0.11% of the population) who belonged to the Christian Catholic faith.

== Sport ==
- Wohlen has been host to the Swiss Sidecarcross Grand Prix eleven times and most recently hosted it in 2009, on 3 May.
- The football club FC Wohlen play in the Swiss Promotion League. Their stadium is the Stadion Niedermatten.

== Notable people ==
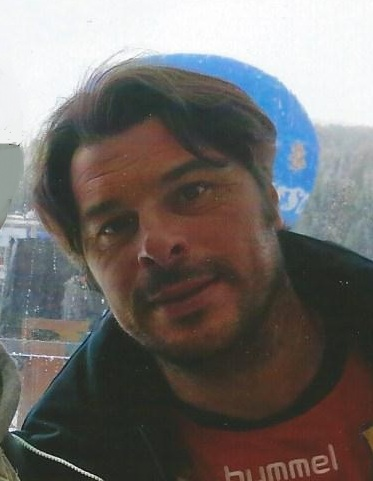
Ciriaco Sforza

- Philippe Bruggisser (born 1948), manager in the airline industry
- Peter J. Huber (born 1934), statistician
- Andy Hug (1964–2000), karateka and kickboxer; raised in Wohlen
- Viktor Korchnoi (1931–2016), Soviet-Swiss chess grandmaster; died here
- Cesar Lüthi (1930–2002), sports marketing businessman
- Seven (born 1978), R&B and soul musician and singer
- Ciriaco Sforza (born 1970), footballer
- Kurt Strebel (1921–2013), mathematician
