= Boswil-Bünzen railway station =

Railway station in Switzerland

Boswil-Bünzen
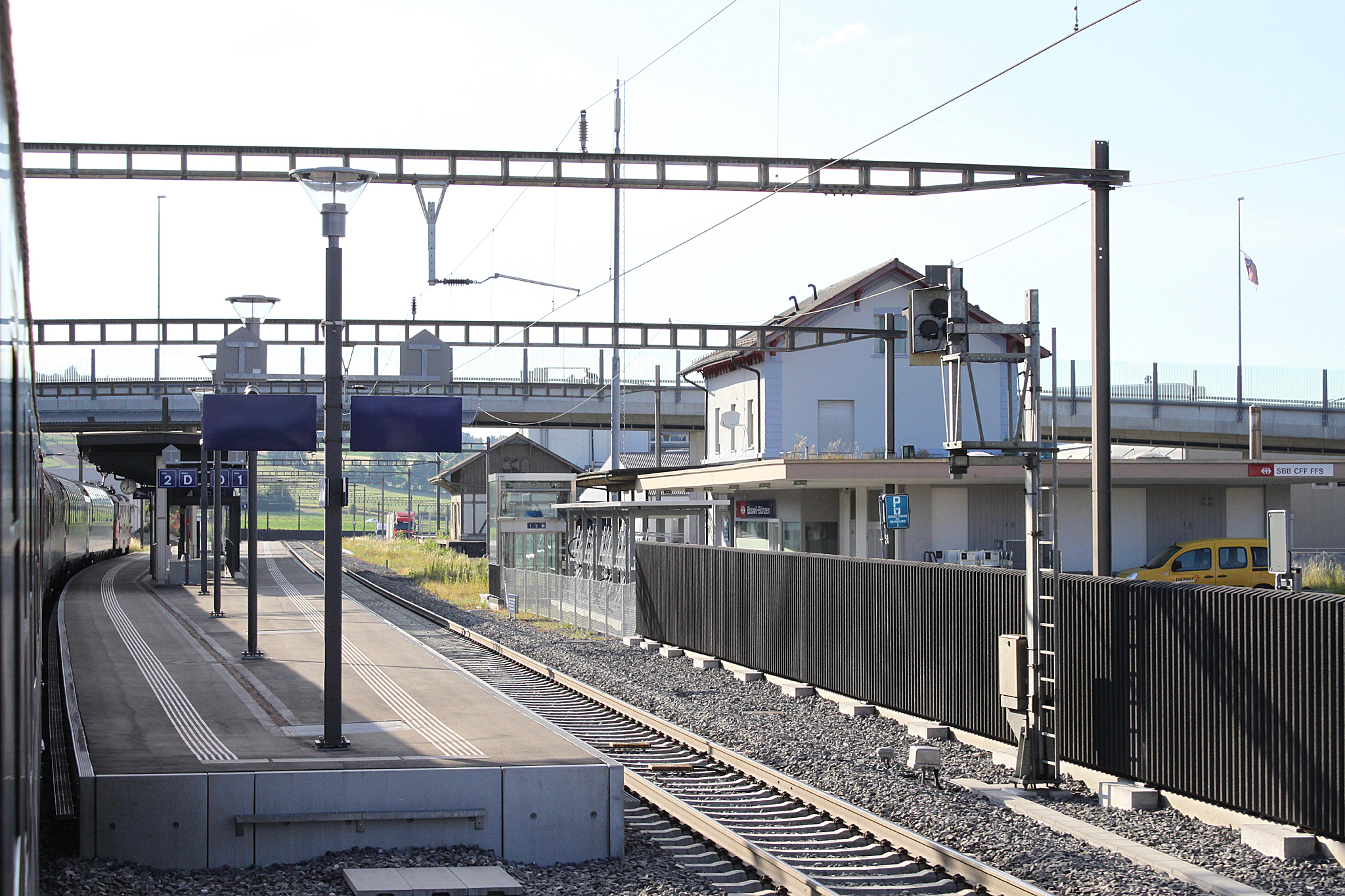
- The station in 2017

General information
- Location: Boswil; Switzerland
- Coordinates: 47°19′N 8°19′E
- Owner: Swiss Federal Railways
- Line: Rupperswil–Immensee line
- Distance: 77.8 km (48.3 mi) from Basel SBB
- Train operators: Swiss Federal Railways

Passengers
- 2018: 870 per weekday

Services
| Preceding station | Aargau S-Bahn | Following station |
|---|---|---|
| Wohlen towards Olten | S26 | Muri AG towards Rotkreuz |
| Preceding station | Zurich S-Bahn | Following station |
| Wohlen towards Zürich Hauptbahnhof | S42 | Muri AG Terminus |
Location
- Location within Switzerland Location within Canton of Aargau

Boswil-Bünzen railway station (German: Bahnhof Boswil-Bünzen) is a railway station in the municipality of Boswil, in the Swiss canton of Aargau. It is an intermediate stop on the standard gauge Rupperswil–Immensee line of Swiss Federal Railways.

== Services ==
The following services stop at Boswil-Bünzen:

- Zürich S-Bahn S42: rush-hour service between Muri AG and Zürich Hauptbahnhof.
- Aargau S-Bahn S26: half-hourly service between Lenzburg and Rotkreuz, with every other train continuing from Lenzburg to Olten.
