= Wohlen railway station =

Railway station in Switzerland

Wohlen
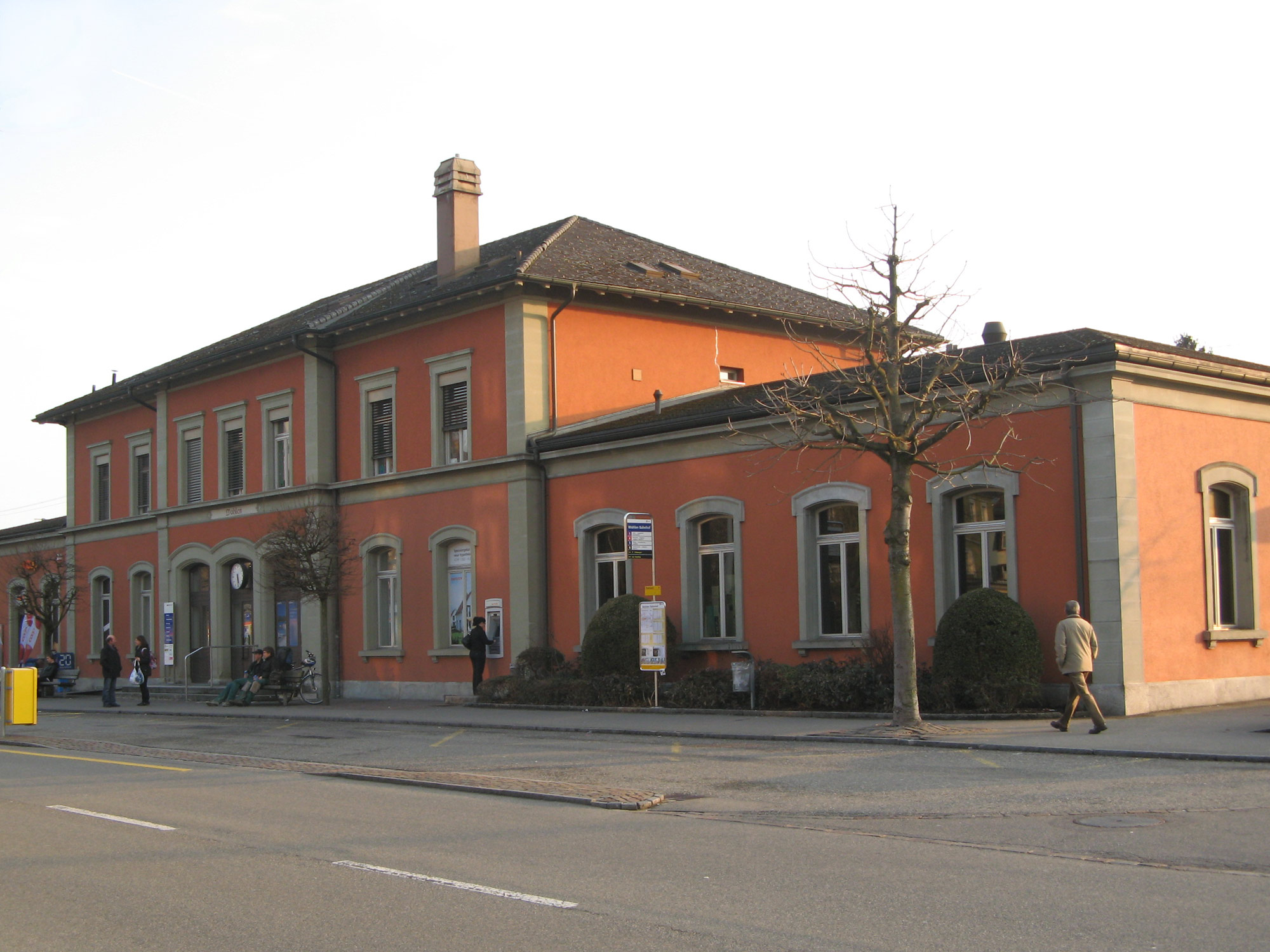
- The station building in 2010

General information
- Location: Wohlen; Switzerland
- Coordinates: 47°20′54″N 8°16′11″E
- Owner: Swiss Federal Railways
- Lines: Bremgarten–Dietikon line; Rupperswil–Immensee line
- Distance: 71.8 km (44.6 mi) from Basel SBB
- Train operators: Aargau Verkehr; Swiss Federal Railways
- Connections: Aargau Verkehr and PostAuto Schweiz buses

Construction
- Architect: Fechter (1874)

History
- Opened: 1874

Passengers
- 2018: 6,500 per weekday (does not include S17)

Services
Preceding station	SBB CFF FFS	Following station
Lenzburg towards Olten	RE6 Limited service	Muri AG towards Arth-Goldau
Preceding station	Aargau S-Bahn	Following station
Dottikon-Dintikon towards Brugg AG	S25	Muri AG Terminus
Dottikon-Dintikon towards Olten	S26	Boswil-Bünzen towards Rotkreuz
Preceding station	Zurich S-Bahn	Following station
Terminus	S17	Wohlen Oberdorf towards Dietikon
Dottikon-Dintikon towards Zürich Hauptbahnhof	S42	Boswil-Bünzen towards Muri AG
Location

Wohlen railway station, also known as Wohlen AG railway station, is a railway station in the municipality of Wohlen in the Swiss canton of Aargau. The station is located on the standard gauge Rupperswil–Immensee line of Swiss Federal Railways, between Lenzburg and Rotkreuz. The Aargau Verkehr Bremgarten–Dietikon line, a 1,000 mm (3 ft 3 3/8 in) gauge line with some characteristics of a roadside tramway, terminates at a platform opposite the SBB platforms.

== Services ==
As of the December 2023 timetable change, the following services stop at Wohlen:

- RegioExpress: three round-trips on weekends between Olten and Arth-Goldau.
- Zürich S-Bahn:
  - S17: half-hourly service to Dietikon.
  - S42: rush-hour service between Muri AG and Zürich Hauptbahnhof.
- Aargau S-Bahn:
  - S25: hourly service between Muri AG and Brugg AG.
  - S26: half-hourly service between Lenzburg and Rotkreuz, with every other train continuing from Lenzburg to Olten.

All trains except the S17 run on the Rupperswil–Immensee line, while the S17 operates over the Bremgarten–Dietikon line.

== Gallery ==
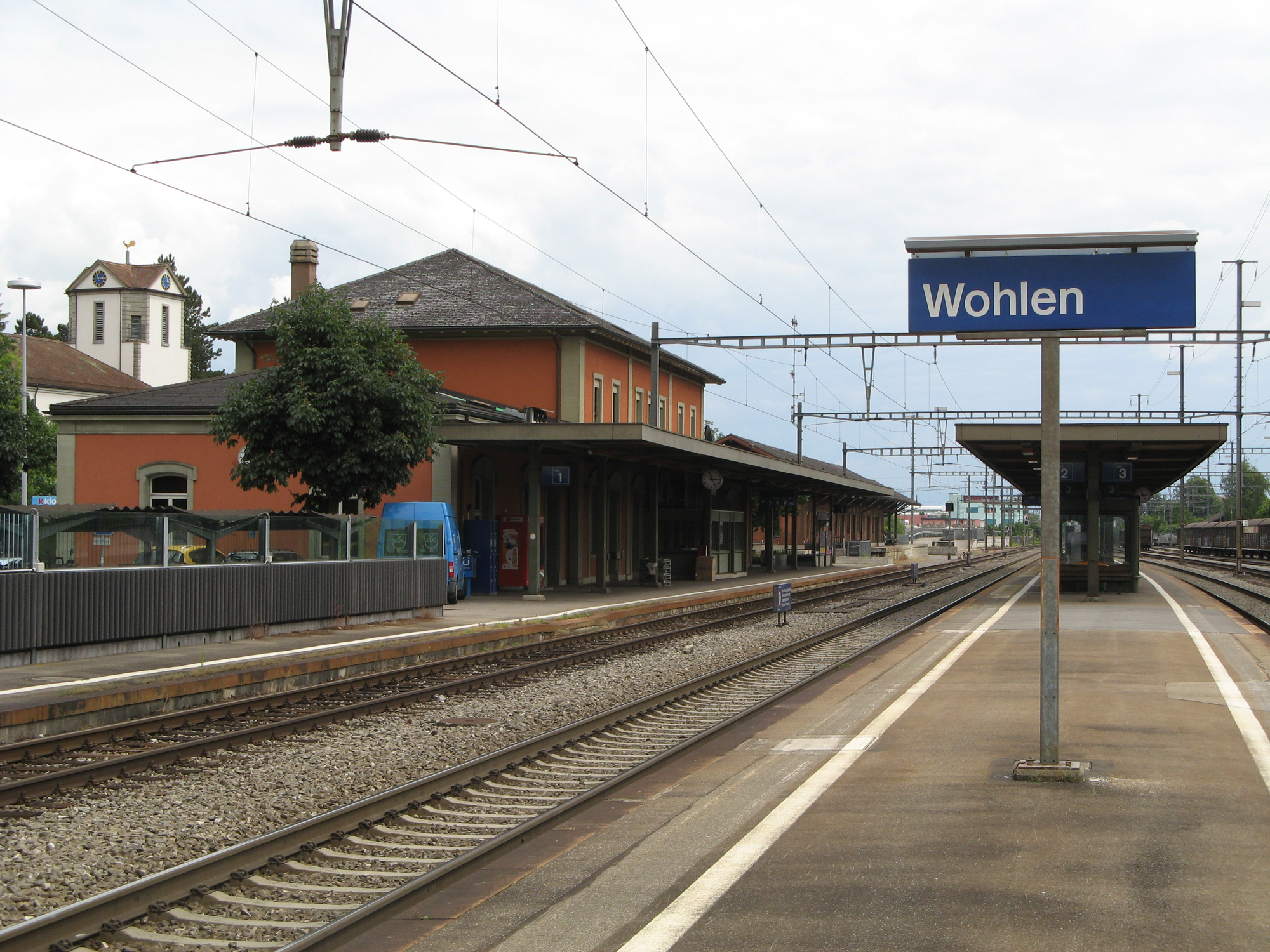
The main line platforms

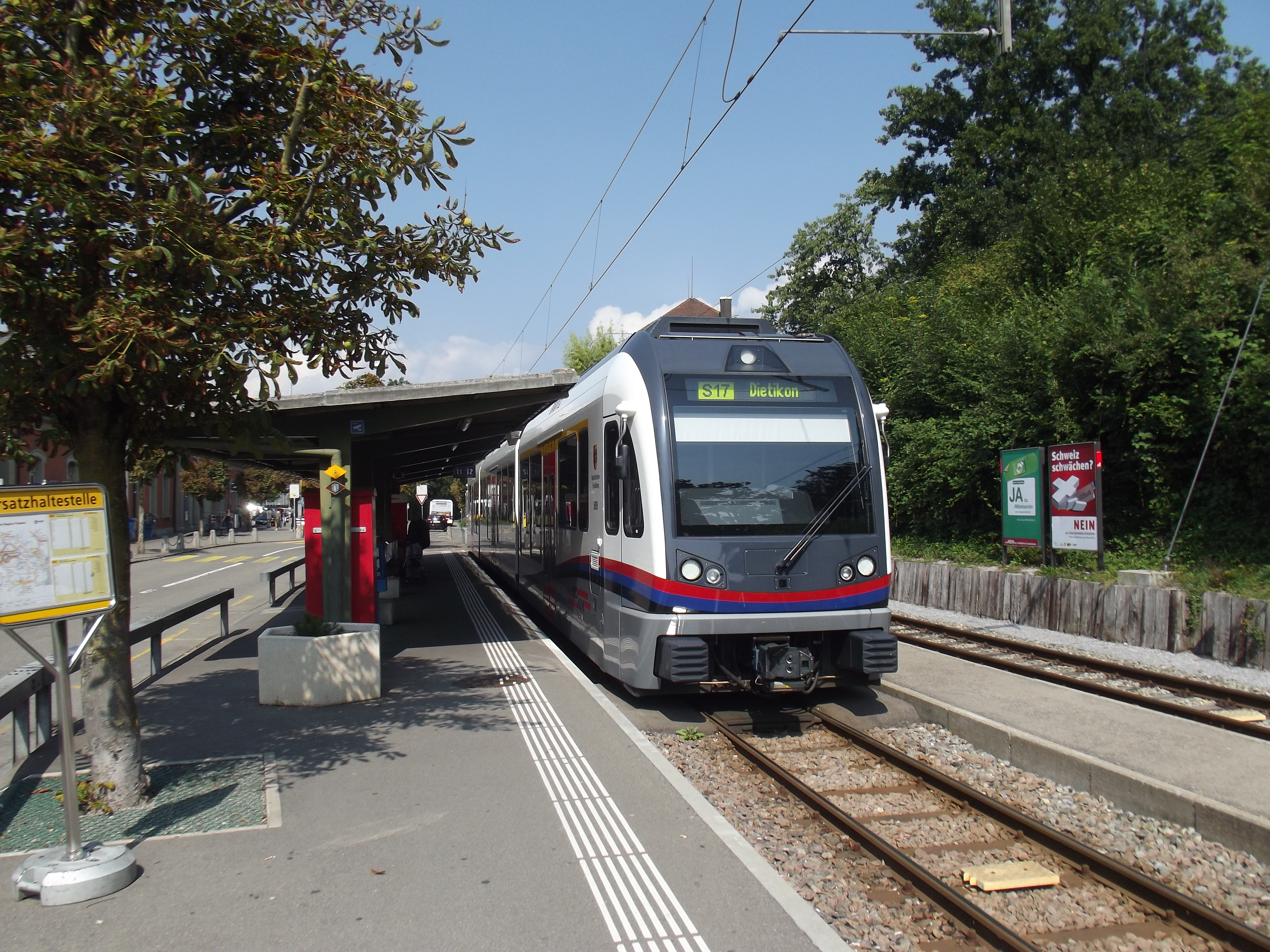
The Bremgarten–Dietikon platforms
