= Wohlen–Dietikon railway line =

Railway service in Switzerland

Wohlen–Dietikon railway line (S17)
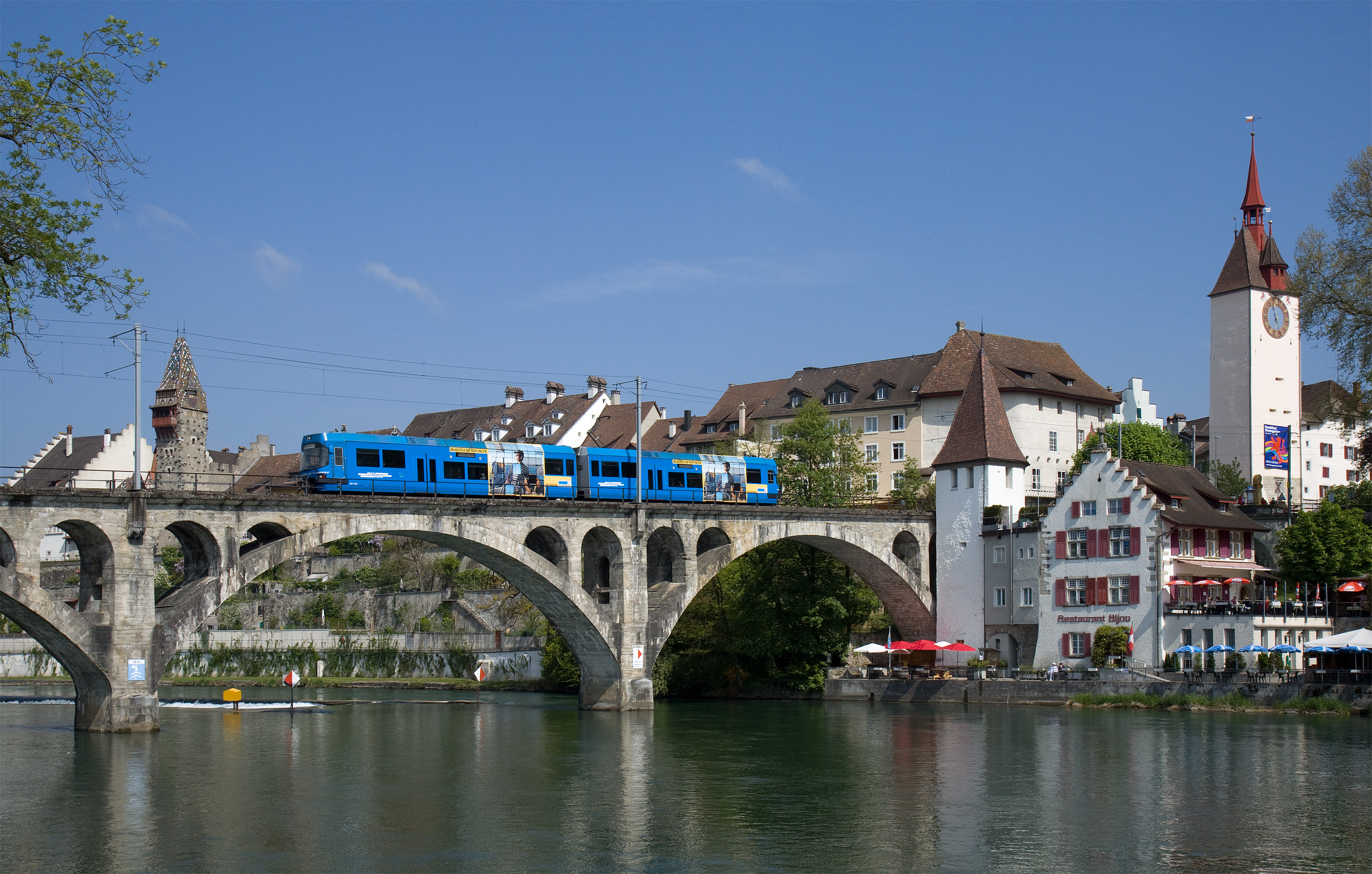
- One of the, since sold, Be 4/8 units on the railway bridge in Bremgarten

Overview
- Status: Operational
- Owner: Aargau Verkehr AG (AVA)
- Locale: Switzerland
- Termini: Wohlen, Aargau, Canton of Aargau; Dietikon, Canton of Zürich
- Stations: 20

Service
- Type: Light rail
- System: Zürich S-Bahn
- Services: 1
- Operator: Aargau Verkehr AG (AVA)
- Depot: Bremgarten

History
- Opened: 1876 (Wohlen–Bremgarten West); 1902 (Bremgarten–Dietikon); 1912 (Bremgarten West–Bremgarten)

Technical
- Line length: 18.8 km (11.7 mi)
- Number of tracks: Mixture of single and double track
- Track gauge: 1,000 mm (3 ft 3 3/8 in) metre gauge
- Old gauge: 1,435 mm (4 ft 8 1/2 in) standard gauge
- Minimum radius: 25 m (82 ft)
- Electrification: Overhead line, 1,200 V DC
- Maximum incline: 5.6%

The Wohlen–Dietikon railway line is a railway line in Switzerland. It connects Wohlen and Bremgarten in the canton of Aargau with Dietikon in the canton of Zürich. Passenger service on the line now forms part of the Zürich S-Bahn, branded as the S17, and a frequent service is provided, with trains running up to every 15 minutes.

The line was opened in stages by the Bremgarten-Dietikon-Bahn between 1876 and 1912. Whilst the earliest section to be opened, between Wohlen and Bremgarten, was built as a traditional standard gauge branch line, the later section between Bremgarten and Dietikon was built as rural electric tramway in metre gauge. Whilst much of the line has been upgraded, this is still apparent in the long stretches of roadside track, and stretches of street running in Dietikon.

Today the line is owned and operated by Aargau Verkehr AG (AVA), a company that operates other rail and bus services in the region.

== History ==
=== Wohlen-Bremgarten railway ===
The route between Wohlen and Bremgarten West was built to standard gauge by the Aargauische Südbahn railway, which connected Aarau and Rotkreuz via Wohlen. The service began on 1 September 1876, operated by steam locomotives.

On 1 January 1902 Swiss Federal Railways (SBB) took over the Aargauische Südbahn. The SBB continued to operate the service as a steam operated standard gauge branch line.

=== Bremgarten-Dietikon tramway ===
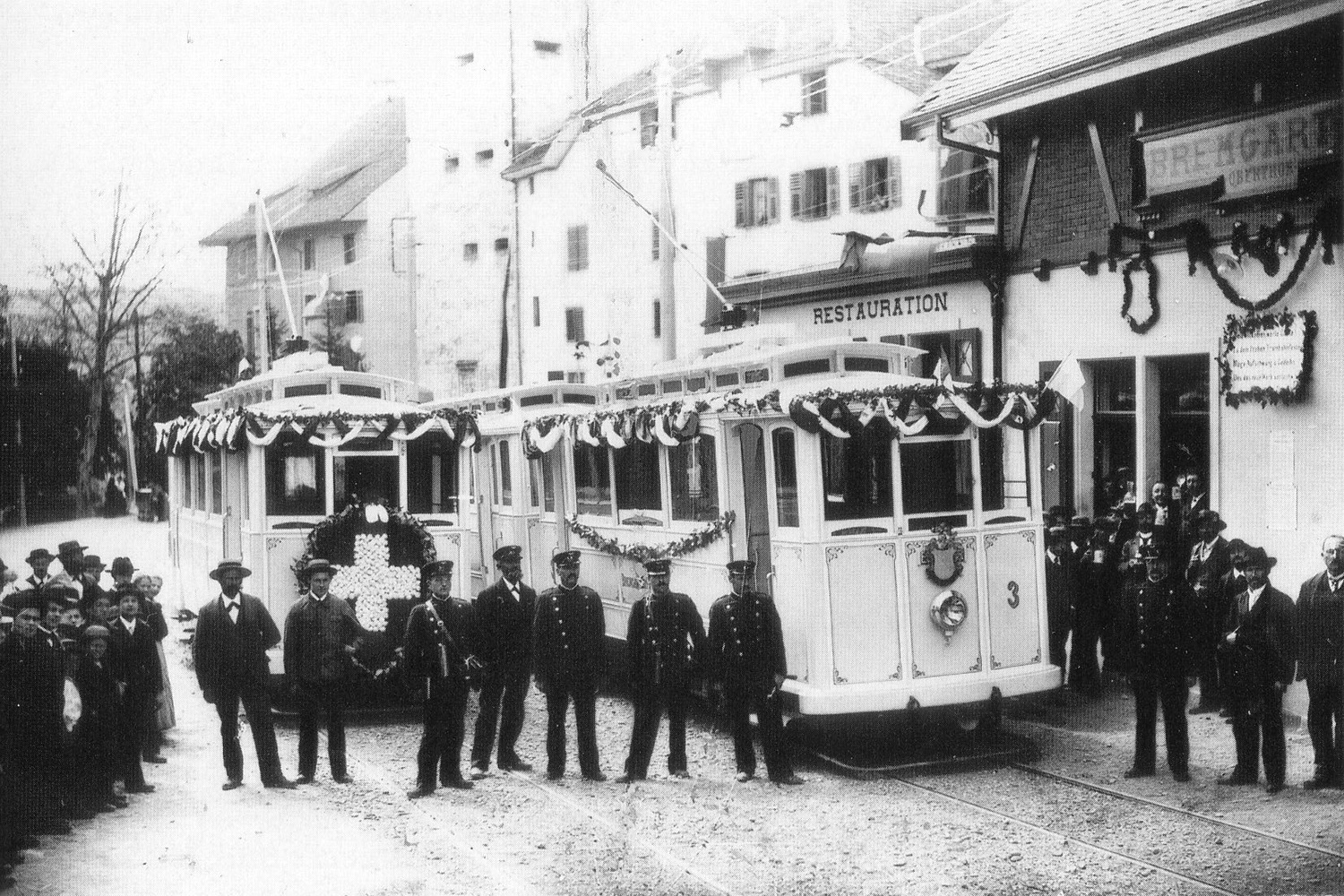
Opening of the Bremgarten-Dietikon line

The line to Wohlen had several disadvantages for Bremgarten. The timetable was poor, Bremgarten West station was too far away from the town centre, and the connection to Zürich initially proceeded in the wrong direction and was very indirect. In 1895 a plan was produced for a roadside electric tramway between Bremgarten and Dietikon. As Dietikon already had a direct rail link to Zürich, this provided a much more direct connection.

Construction began in 1901 and the route was opened on 30 April 1902. The new line crossed the Mutschellen pass between its two terminal points, was owned by the Bremgarten-Dietikon-Bahn company (BD), and built to metre gauge. The line's headquarters and terminus were at Bremgarten station, close to the town's centre. Besides the connection to the main line railway at Dietikon, the line shared track in Dietikon with the Limmattal-Strassenbahn, which provided a link to the Zürich city tram system.

=== Wohlen-Dietikon through service ===
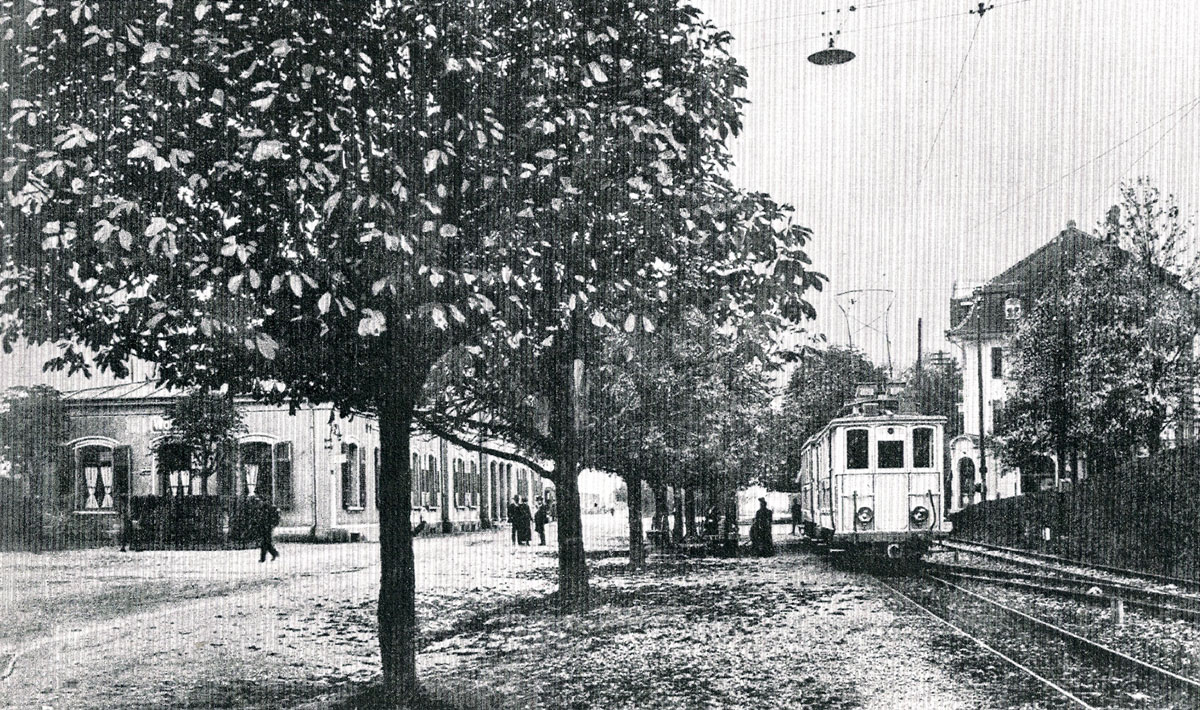
The terminus in Wohlen after connection of the two lines

Despite the construction of the new line, there was still a gap of about a kilometre between Bremgarten and Bremgarten West where passengers had to make their own way. The BD entered into negotiations with the SBB, and in 1910, a permanent lease for the Wohlen-Bremgarten railway line was obtained.

The conversion, and electrification, of the standard gauge line to dual gauge (standard and metre), from Wohlen to Bremgarten West, permitted standard gauge freight to continue to access Bremgarten West. A new terminus was constructed opposite the main line station in Wohlen. In Bremgarten, a new stretch of metre gauge line was constructed to connect the two stations, including an imposing railway bridge across the river Reuss. Through-running between Wohlen and Dietikon began on 8 February 1912.

=== Modernisation ===
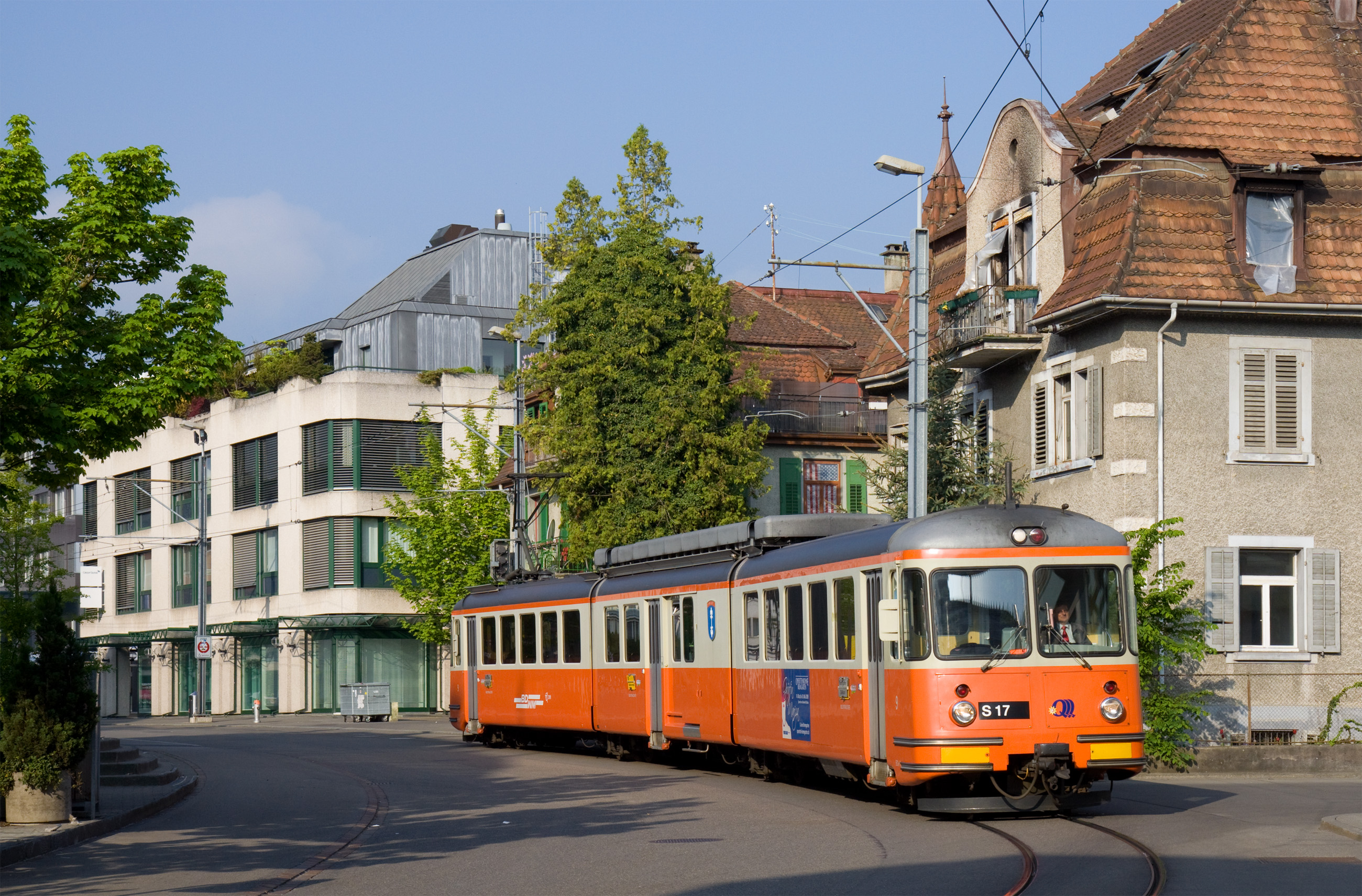
One of the BDe 8/8 units on street track in Dietikon

After 1950 the line was modernised to suburban railway standards using new rolling stock and facilities. In 1969, the line took delivery of 9 new articulated BDe 8/8 units, which were to be the mainstay of the line for the next 40 years.

The opening of the rapid-transit Zürich S-Bahn network on 27 May 1990 caused major development. The route and timetable were integrated into the rapid-transit railway network, and three new stops with interchange facilities with other public transport modes were added.

In 1993, the line's rolling stock was augmented by 5 new Be 4/8 low-floor units. In 1995, a double-track section was built between Rudolfstetten Hofacker and Berikon-Widen, which was extended two years later to the Belveder stop.

=== BDWM Transport ===
In 2000, the BD company merged with the Wohlen-Meisterschwanden-Bahn company (WM) to form BDWM Transport. Despite its name and by the time of the merger, the WM company was a bus operator, and BDWM Transport operated a number of bus services in addition to the Bremgarten–Dietikon line.

In 2010, the BDWM took delivery of the first of 14 new ABe 4/8 articulated low floor units, intended to replace all the previous units. The 40-year-old BDe 8/8 units were, with the exception of the preservation of a single unit, scrapped. The 17-year-old Be 4/8 units were sold to the Wynental and Suhrental Railway.

=== End of the standard gauge ===
The last standard gauge freight train operated to Bremgarten in 2009, although occasional standard gauge passenger trains aimed at the rail enthusiast market have run since. When track renewal was due in 2015, the decision was made to relay the line as meter gauge only. The end of the standard gauge was marked with special trains on June 26–28, and in July service between Bremgarten West and Wohlen was suspended for a number of days for the removal of the standard gauge track and renewal of the meter gauge track.

=== Aargau Verkehr ===
In June 2018, BDWM Transport merged with the Wynental and Suhrental Railway to form Aargau Verkehr AG (AVA), the company which now owns and operates the Bremgarten–Dietikon line.

== Operation ==
=== Route ===
Zürich S-Bahn network as of December 2018

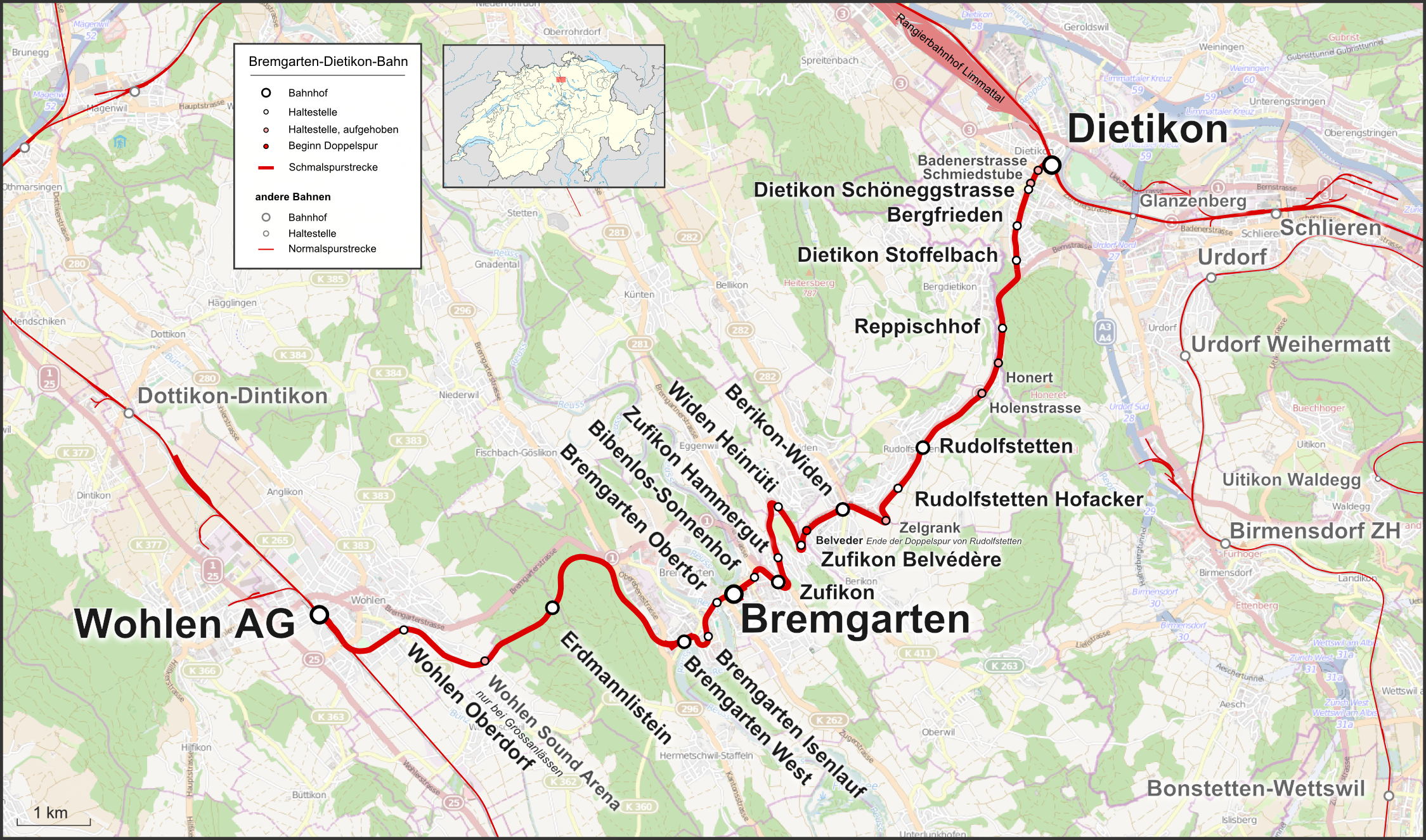
Map of the line

The line begins in Wohlen at a platform opposite the SBB Wohlen station at an altitude of 426 m (1,398 ft). The line climbs to an altitude of 451 m (1,480 ft) and passes into the Bremgarterwald (Bremgarten Forest). The Erdmannlistein stop lies in the middle in the forest and serves exclusively trip traffic. After 6.6 km, the Bremgarten West station is reached. This was originally the terminus of the old standard gauge branch railway whose route has been followed since Wohlen, and thus far the line is rather flat (maximum gradient of 1.5%), has gentle turning radii (minimum 300 m or 984 ft) and resembles a normal SBB standard gauge line. After Bremgarten West, the line changes its character completely, adopting the sharper curves and steeper gradients of a narrow gauge line.

After negotiating two sharp curves out of Bremgarten West station, the line runs along the 156-metre-long (512 ft) bridge over the Reuss. The company's headquarters, including a depot and administration building, are located at Bremgarten station at an altitude of 389 m (1,276 ft). From here on the line runs alongside the main road through a more densely populated, although still rural, area. A series of exceptionally tight U-shaped curves takes the line uphill, at slopes of up to 5.6%, to Berikon-Widen station on the Mutschellen pass at an altitude of 553 m (1,814 ft). From here the line drops through equally tortuous curves to Rudolfstetten Hofacker, where the downward gradient becomes gradually flatter. From Bergfrieden station the line has tramway-like characteristics with street-running. The line ends at Dietikon station at a platform beside the SBB tracks and at an altitude of 391 m (1,283 ft).

=== Infrastructure ===
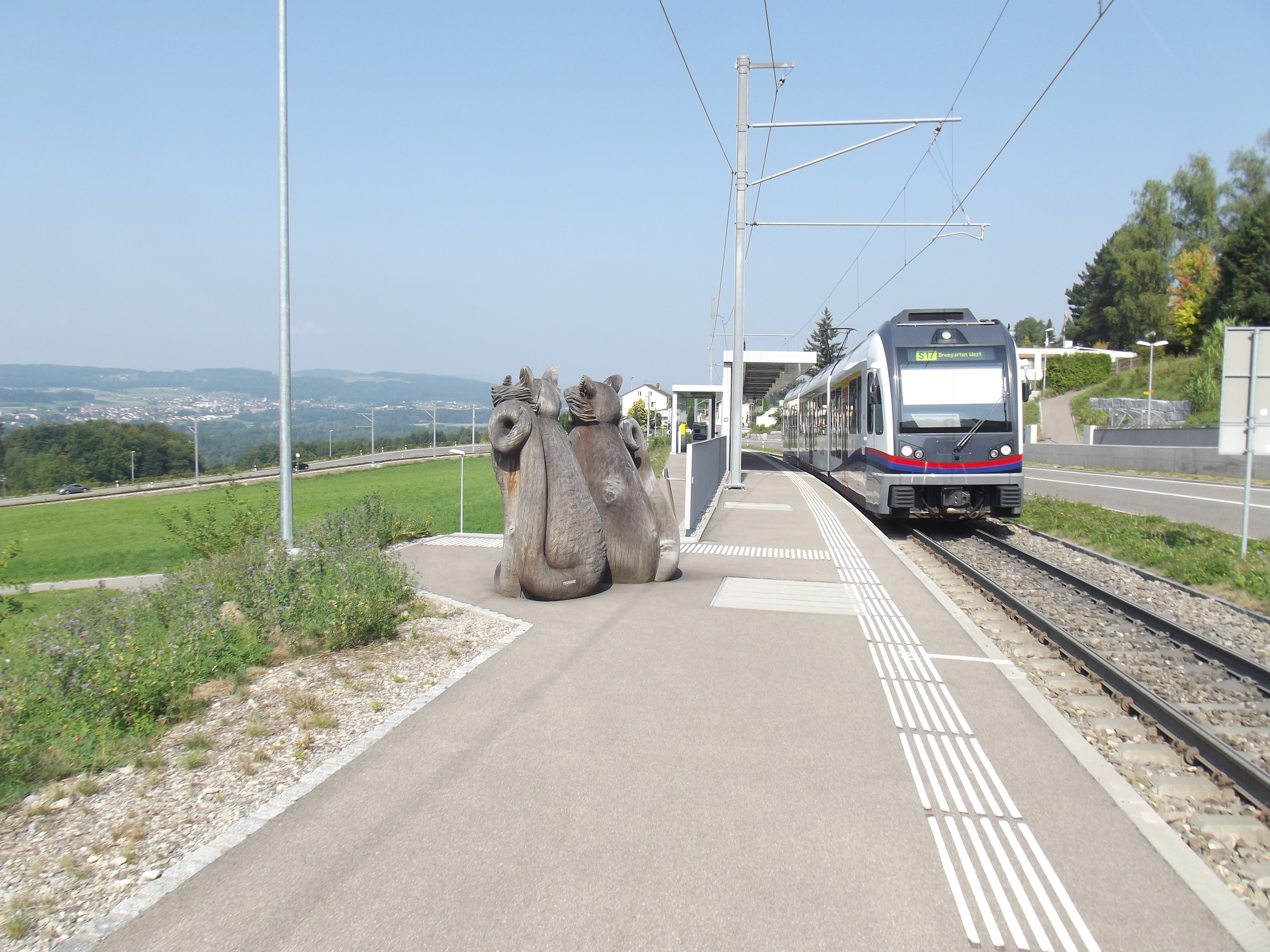
An ABe 4/8 unit at the Heinrüti halt on the climb to the Mutschellen pass; note the continuation of the track alongside the road to the middle left.

The line is 18.8 km (11.7 mi) long, of which 1.6 km (1.0 mi) is double track and the rest single track. It has a minimum curve radius of 25 m (82 ft), and a maximum gradient of 5.6%. A section of 0.8 km (0.5 mi) length in Dietikon runs in the street, sharing its road space with other traffic. The line is equipped with metre gauge (1,000 mm / 3 ft 3 3/8 in gauge) track throughout, and is electrified at 1200 V DC, using an overhead line.

=== Services ===
- S17 Dietikon–Bremgarten–Bremgarten West–Wohlen

The passenger services on the line now forms part of the Zürich S-Bahn, branded as the S17. A service of two trains per hour is provided every day between Wohlen and Dietikon. Except on Sundays and public holidays, an extra two trains per hour are provided between Bremgarten West and Dietikon. Apart from a small number of additional peak-hour express trains, all trains serve all stops, taking just over 30 minutes for the full length of the line.

=== Rolling stock ===
The line uses the following rolling stock:

Image	Numbers	Notation	Year	Notes
	7	BDe 8/8	1969	Articulated unit from the class of vehicles that operated the line for 40 years from 1969. Built by Schweizerische Wagons- und Aufzügefabrik AG Schlieren-Zürich (SWS) and Maschinenfabrik Oerlikon (MFO), this unit is preserved and used on special services. (Illustration is of a different unit of the same class, which has since been scrapped).
	10	BDe 4/4	1928	Bogie motor car, preserved and used on special services.
	51-52	Tm 2/2	1967-68	Diesel shunters
	5001–5014	ABe 4/8	2010-11	Articulated low floor units built by Stadler Rail, which now operate all regular passenger services.

== Future ==
There is a light rail system in the densely populated Limmattal area, west of Zürich, which connects to the Bremgarten–Dietikon in Dietikon. To the west of Dietikon the line link to Spreitenbach and Killwangen, whilst to the east it would run through Urdorf and Schlieren to Zürich-Altstetten railway station, with connection to the Zürich tram route 2 (Verkehrsbetriebe Zürich). A referendum, held in November 2015, approved the construction of the line, and it was announced in May 2016 that the line would be operated by BDWM. Construction was scheduled to start in late 2017, with a planned opening in 2022.

The Limmattal light rail line shares tracks with the Bremgarten–Dietikon line, from the latter's terminus at Dietikon station to the intersection of Bremgartnerstrasse and Zentralstrasse. The common section of on-street track, which is currently single track, is doubled.

== See also ==
- Rail transport in Switzerland
- ZVV fare zones
- A-Welle tariff network (Aargau)
