= Josef Wiederkehr =

Swiss businessman and politician

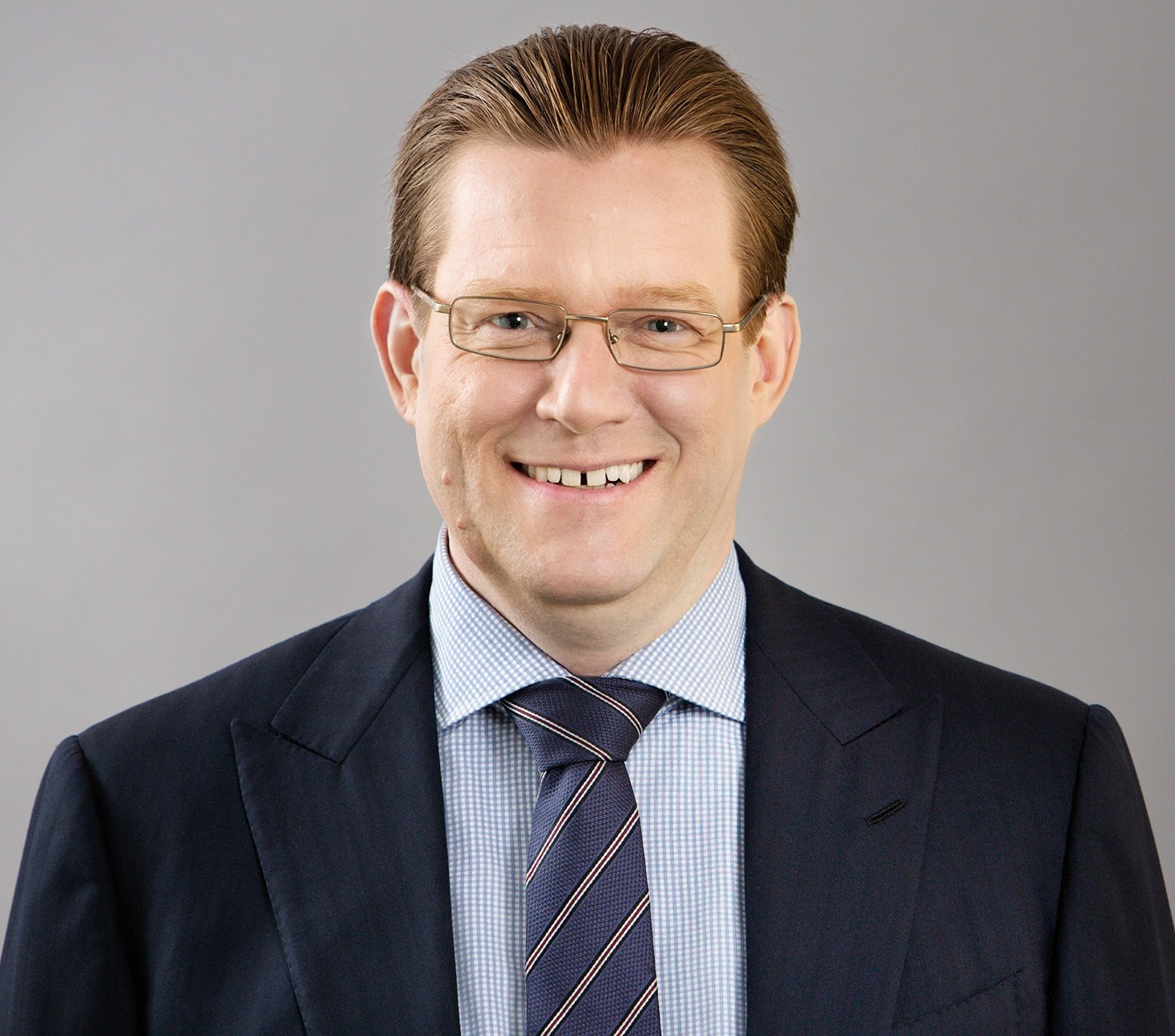
- Born: July 4, 1970 (age 54); Dietikon, Switzerland
- Education: University of Zurich(Ph.D.)
- Occupation(s): Businessman and politician, President of the Swiss Scaffolding-Entrepreneurs Association
- Website: www.josef-wiederkehr.ch

Josef "Gius" Wiederkehr (born 4 July 1970, Dietikon, Switzerland) is a Swiss businessman and politician (CVP). From 1999 to 2012, Wiederkehr was CVP-councilman in Dietikon. Since 2005, he has been a member of the Cantonal Council of Zürich.

== Life and career ==
Wiederkehr visited primary and secondary schools in Dietikon. After completing a mason's apprenticeship, he obtained his Matura (Type C) and studied economics at the University of Zurich from 1993 to 1998. After receiving his doctoral degree, he returned to work. The Wiederkehr family has been active in the construction and scaffolding industry for four generations. Since 2000, Wiederkehr leads the family owned construction company, Josef Wiederkehr AG, S + W construction company and Bertani Baugerüste AG. Since March 2009, he is President of the Swiss Scaffolding-Entrepreneurs Association (SGUV).

Since April 2015, Wiederkehr has been President of the Dietiker Industrie- und Handelsverein (IHV), since 2014, President of the Kantonaler Gewerbeverband (KGV) and from 2000 to 2014, president of the Arbeitsgemeinschaft Wirtschaft und Gesellschaft (AWG) of the Canton of Zurich. In addition, he is an active member of the Committee "Vorwärts Limmattal", the Committee for Regional Transport Solutions, as well as co-presidium member in the committee "Gateway: so nicht!". In the Swiss army, Wiederkehr holds the rank of colonel.

== Politics ==
From 1999 to 2012, Josef Wiederkehr sat in the town council of the city of Dietikon for the CVP. In 2005, he was elected to the Zurich Cantonal Council. There he was Vice President of the Commission for Planning and Construction and Vice President of the Fraction, also he was a member of the Interfacional Conference (IFK). He was also Vice President of the CVP Canton of Zurich and CVP Dietikon and also on the Board of CVP Switzerland. On 18 October 2015, he ran for the National Council elections.

== Publications ==
- Der Einfluss des Financial Accounting auf die Kapitalkosten einer Unternehmung. Treuhand-Kammer, Zürich 2005, ISBN 3-908159-50-4. (Dissertation)
