= Dietikon =

- Municipality
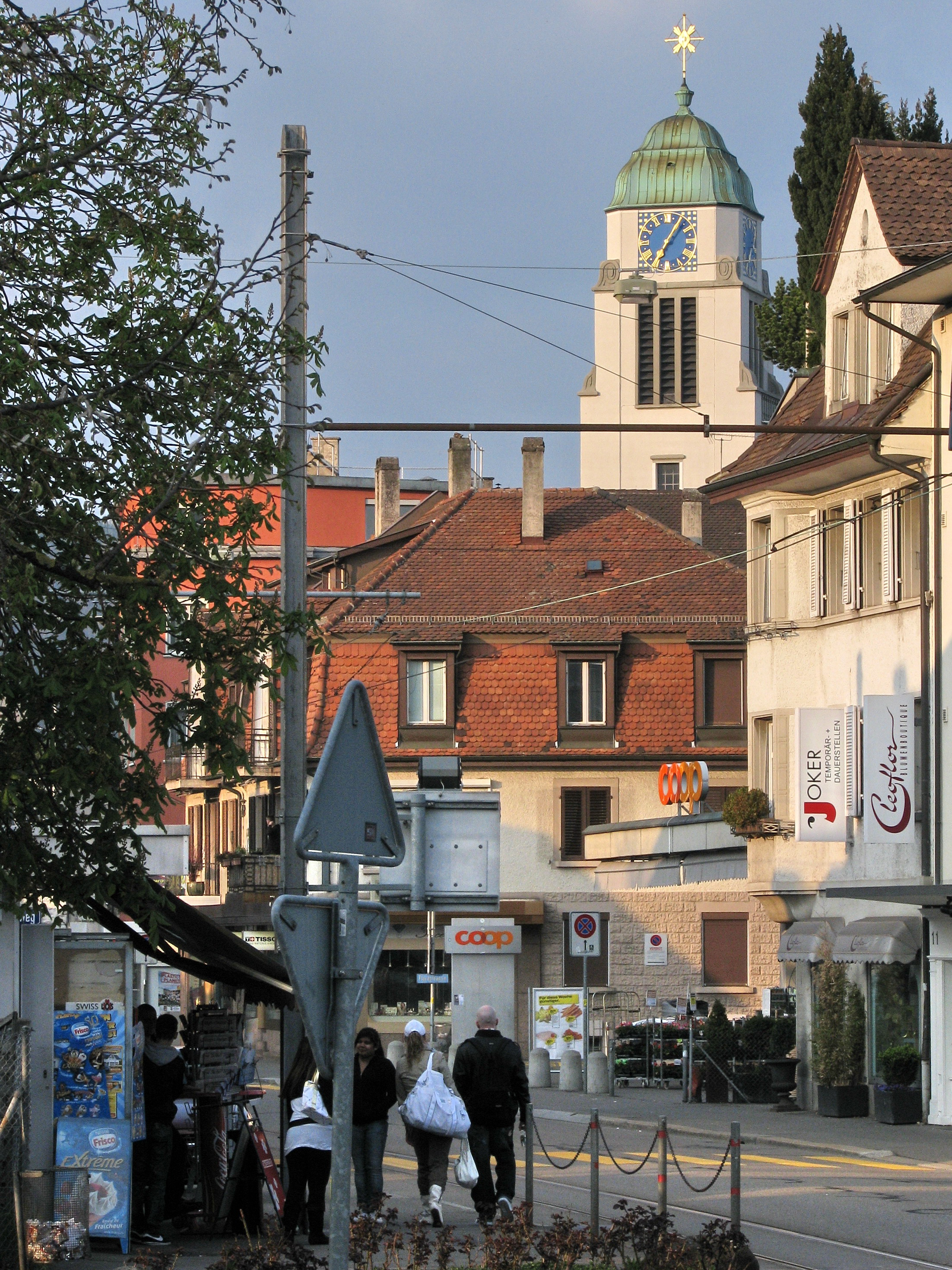

- Flag Coat of arms
- Location of Dietikon
- Location within Switzerland Location within Canton of Zurich
- Coordinates: 47°24′N 8°24′E
- Country: Switzerland
- Canton: Zurich
- District: Dietikon

Government
  - Executive: Stadtrat with 7 members
  - Mayor: Stadtpräsident; Otto Müller (as of March 2014)
  - Parliament: Gemeinderat with 36 members

Area
  - Total: 9.33 km^{2} (3.60 sq mi)
- Elevation: 388 m (1,273 ft)

Population (December 2020)
  - Total: 28,057
  - Density: 3,010/km^{2} (7,790/sq mi)
- Time zone: UTC+01:00 (CET)
  - Summer (DST): UTC+02:00 (CEST)
- Postal code: 8953
- SFOS number: 243
- ISO 3166 code: CH-ZH
- Surrounded by: Bergdietikon (AG), Geroldswil, Oetwil an der Limmat, Schlieren, Spreitenbach (AG), Unterengstringen, Urdorf, Weiningen
- Twin towns: Kolín (Czech Republic), Braggio (Switzerland), Renens (Switzerland)
- Website: www.dietikon.ch

Dietikon (Swiss Standard German: [ˈdiə̯tikɔn]) is a municipality and the fifth-largest town in the canton of Zürich in Switzerland, after Zurich, Winterthur, Uster and Dübendorf. It is the capital of the district of Dietikon and part of the Zurich metropolitan area.

== Geography ==
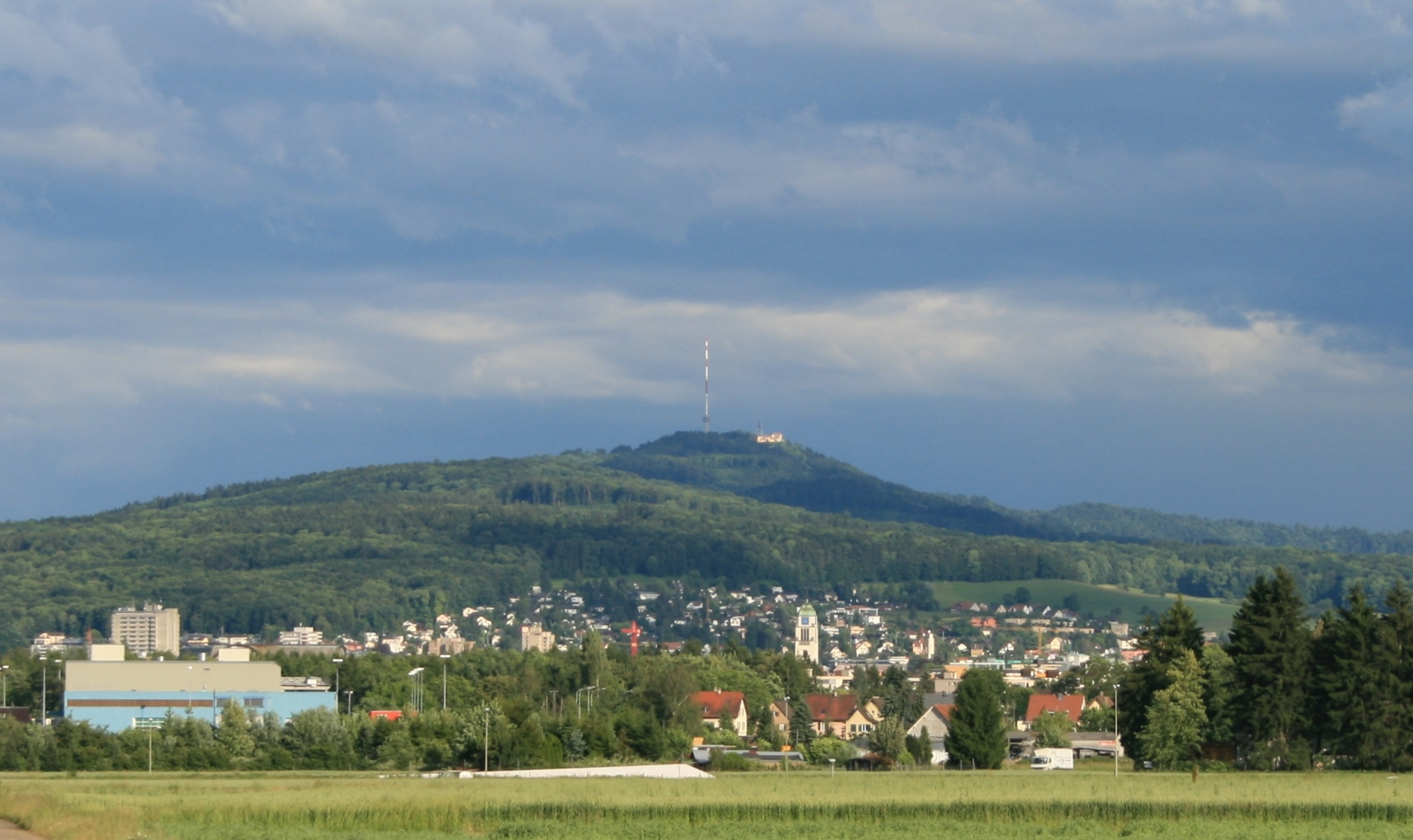
Dietikon and Uetliberg as seen from Spreitenbach

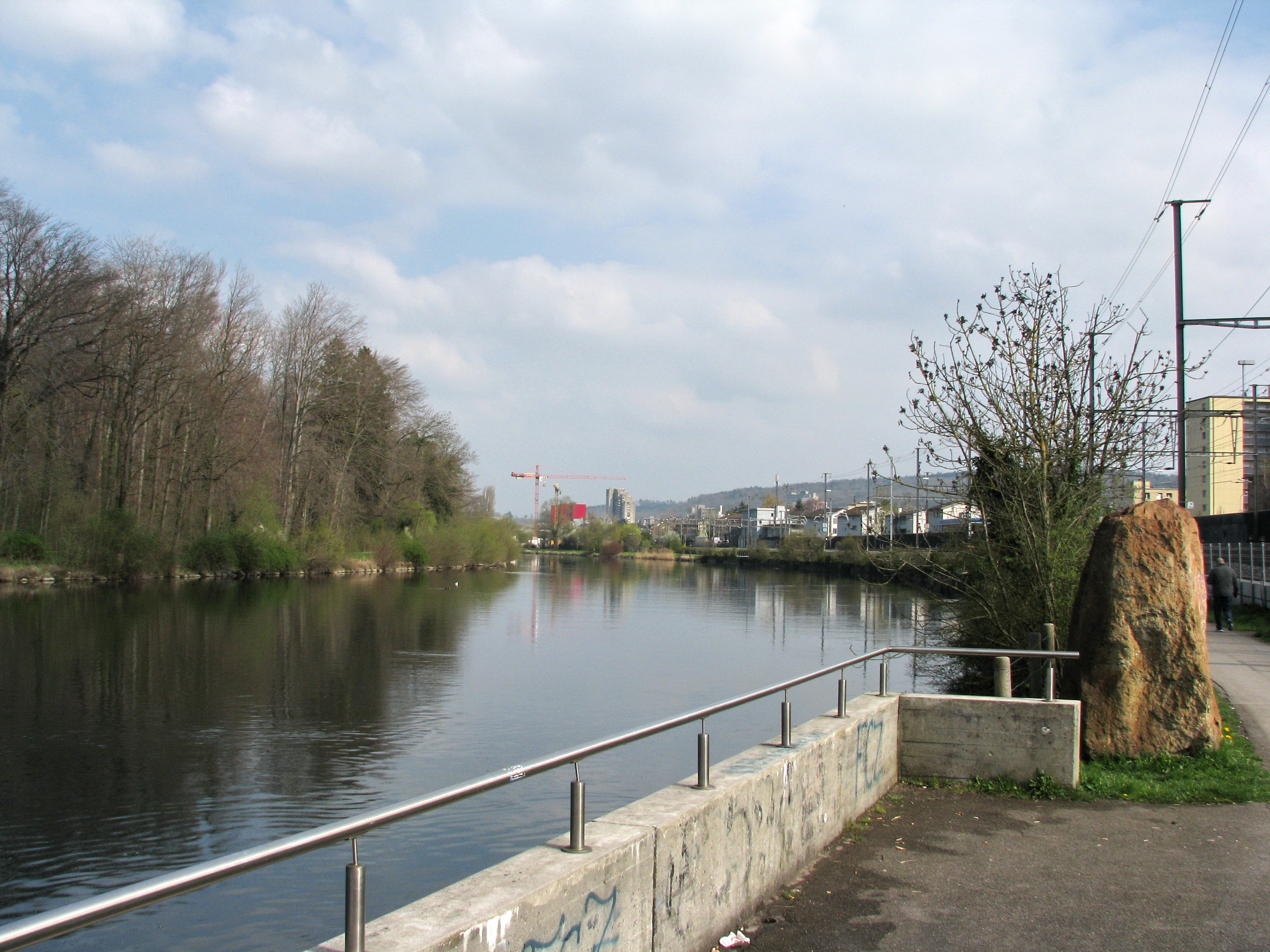
The Limmat at Dietikon railway station

The industrial city Dietikon is situated at an elevation of 388 m (1,273 ft) at the confluence of the Reppisch and the Limmat, located in the Limmat Valley (German: Limmattal), along the railway line from Zurich to Baden. Here and in the neighboring region, Spreitenbach, is also the large Limmattal rail freight marshalling yard.

Dietikon has an area of 9.3 square kilometers (3.6 sq mi). Of this area, 17.2% is used for agricultural purposes, while 27% is forested. Of the rest of the land, 49.1% is settled (buildings or roads) and the remainder (6.7%) is non-productive (rivers, glaciers or mountains). In 1996 housing and buildings made up 33.8% of the total area, while transportation infrastructure made up the rest (15.3%). Of the total unproductive area, water (streams and lakes) made up 4.9% of the area. As of 2007 40.7% of the total municipal area was undergoing some type of construction.

The largest and best known forests of the municipality include the Honeret, Guggenbüehl and Röhrenmoos.

The Honeret forest lies on a side moraine of the Linth glacier ("Linthgletscher"). There are over 200 prominent stones through the woods, up to erratic boulders as big as 25 m^{2} (270 sq ft). The Honeret and the Guggenbüehl-Wald are separated by only one main street. In the forest, there are a few springs from which the brooks Tobelbach and Stoffelbach rise and then flow down into the Reppisch. Also in the forest lies the forest cottage "Lorenzhütte."

The Guggenbüehl forest lies wholly within Dietikon. Within the forest lies the "Giigelibode" pond. It has neither inflow nor outflow. A Vita course is in the forest.

== Transportation ==
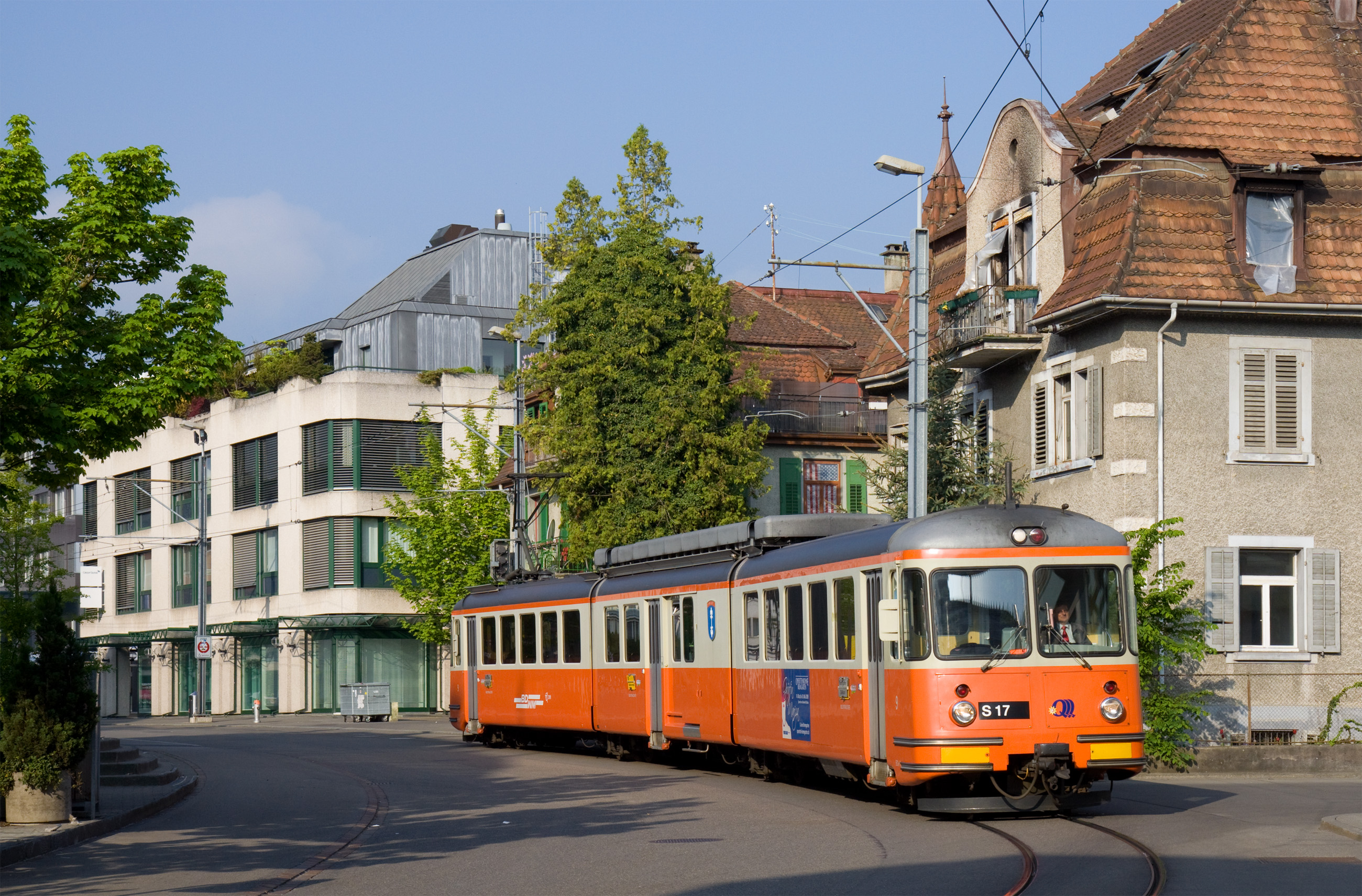
S17 line provided by the Bremgarten-Dietikon-Bahn

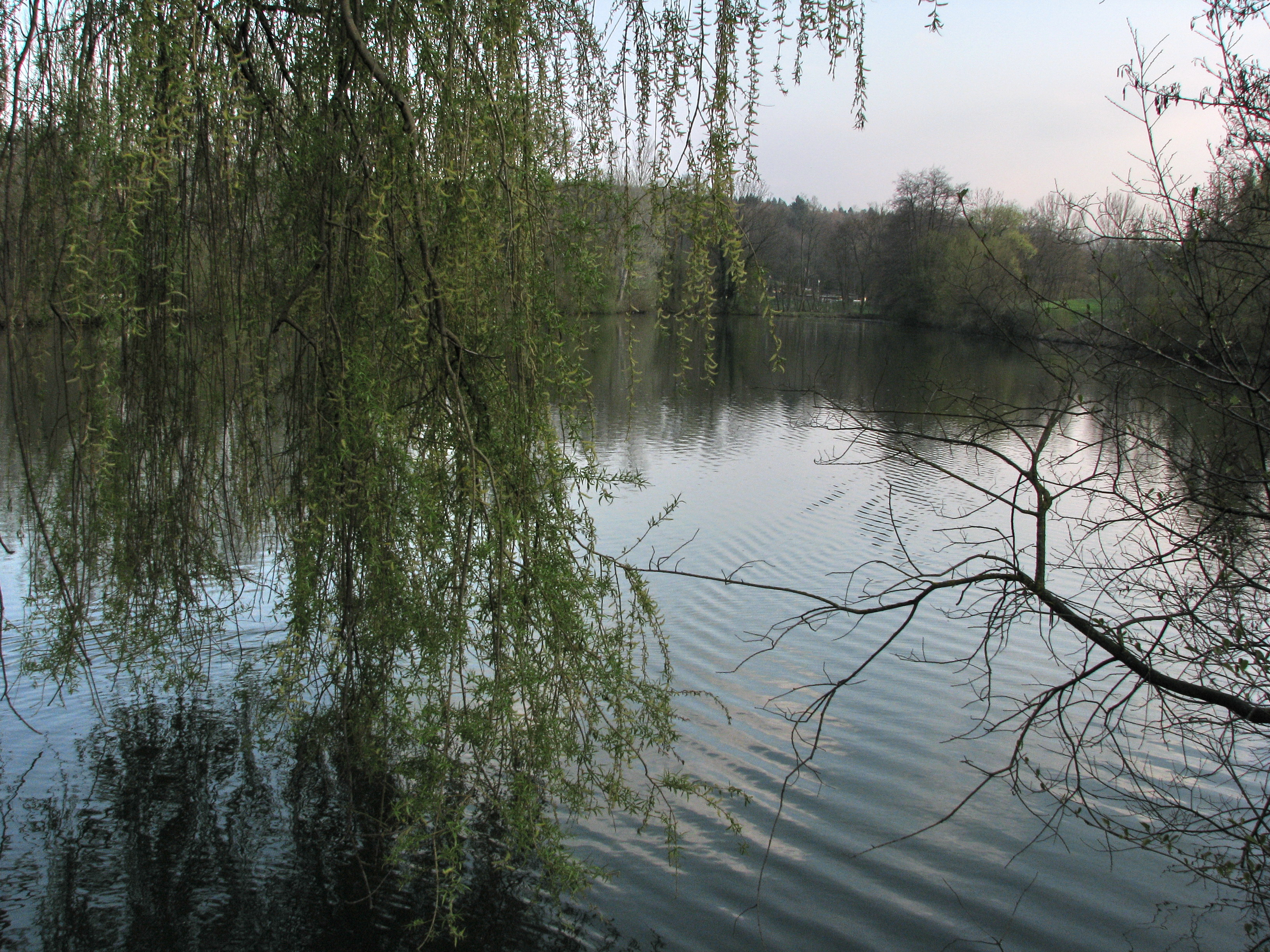
Marmoriweiher pond alongside the Reppisch

The municipality is located on the A3 motorway.

Dietikon railway station and Glanzenberg railway station are stops of the S-Bahn Zürich on the lines S11 and S12. Dietikon railway station is also the terminus of the line S17 provided by the Bremgarten-Dietikon-Bahn.

Between 1900 and 1928, Dietikon was the terminus of the Limmattal tramway from Zurich. The Limmattal light rail line follows a similar alignment, albeit extended through Dietikon to Killwangen.

== Waters ==
Important running waters that flow through Dietikon are the Limmat and its tributary Reppisch. Wide brooks are the approximately 3 km (1.9 mi) long Schäflibach and the Teischlibach. The Schäflibach is created with the flows together from Allmendbach and Stockacherbach and leads into the Limmat. The Teischlibach originates from Röhrenmoos in the forest above Dietikon and also leads into the Limmat. The Marmoriweiher lies in the Grunschen a place used for gaming and grilling. The Marmoriweiher is an artificial pond, that was positioned for the water supply of the fire brigade. For this, a distraction canal was built with the Grunschen. Later, the pond of a marble factory served. This gave it its name.

== History ==
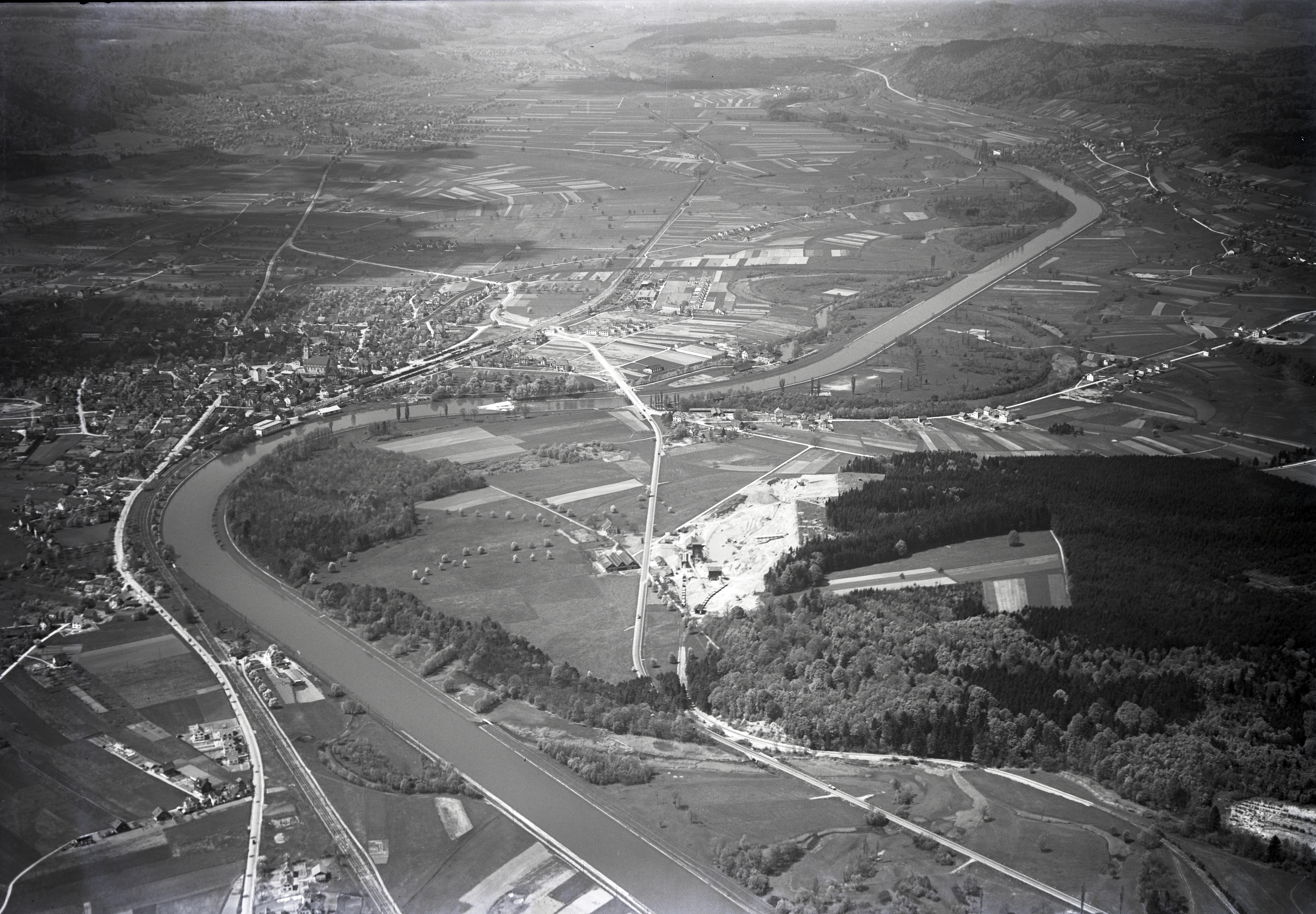
Aerial view by Walter Mittelholzer (1930)

Dietikon is first mentioned in 1100 as Dietinchovin. Dietikon features several Roman ruins and also the Fahr Benedictine Convent, given by the House of Regensberg around 1130 AD, with a cloister church dating from the years 1743 to 1746. The Second Battle of Zurich was fought in Dietikon (September 1799) and the town name is among those inscribed at the pillar of the Arc de Triomphe in Paris, France.

== Demographics ==
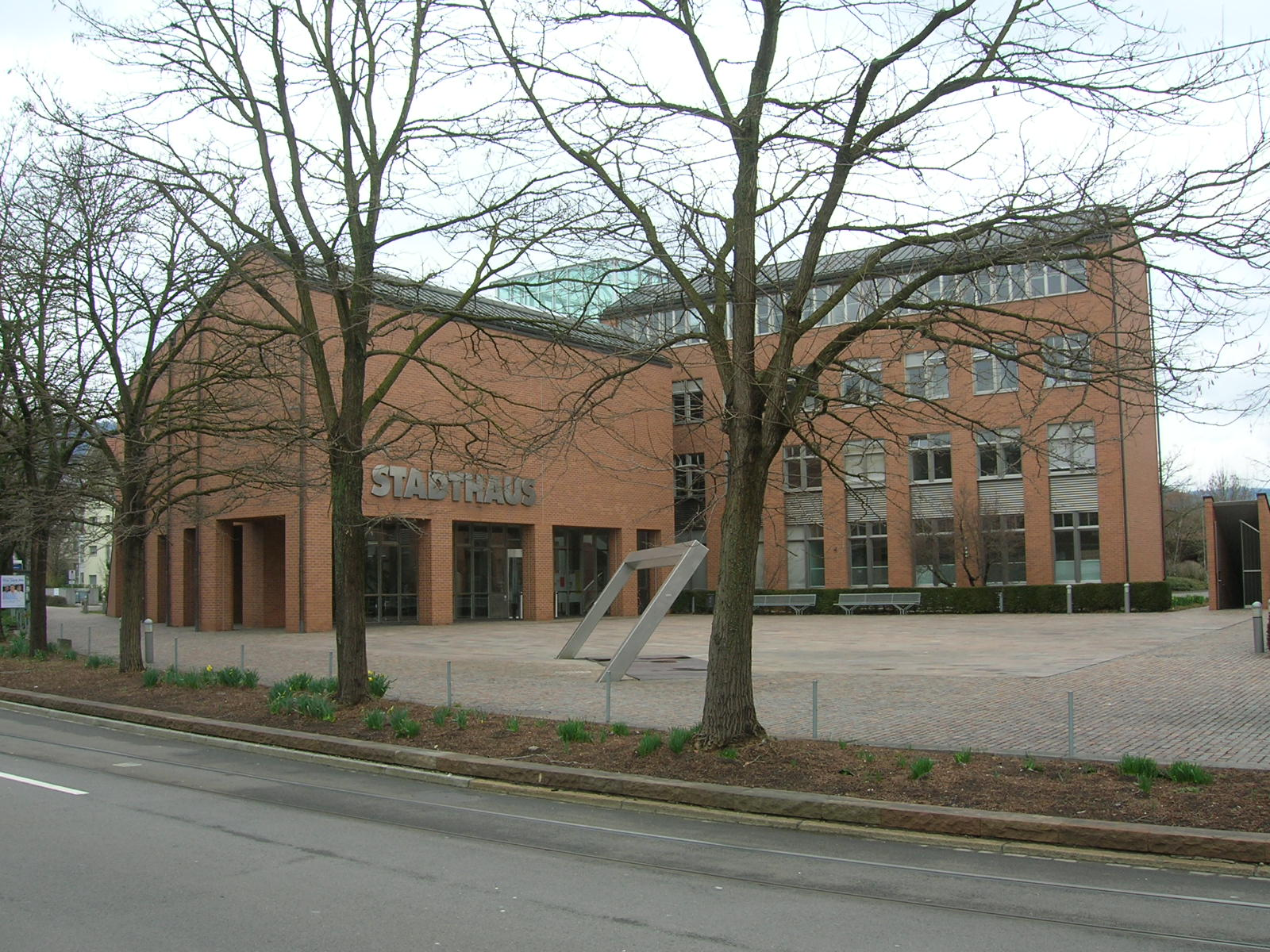
Town hall in Dietikon

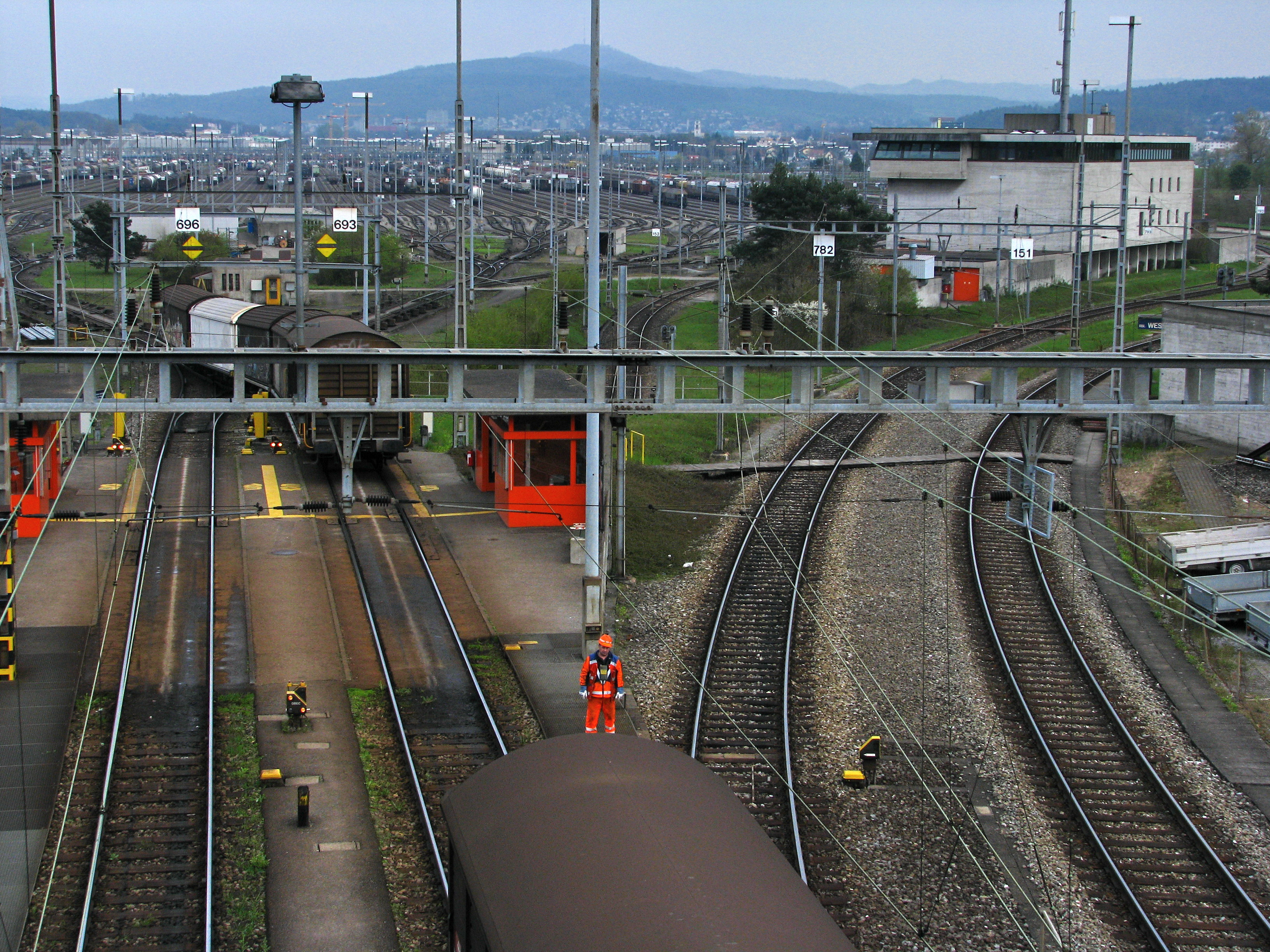
The classification yard RBL (Rangierbahnhof Limmattal)

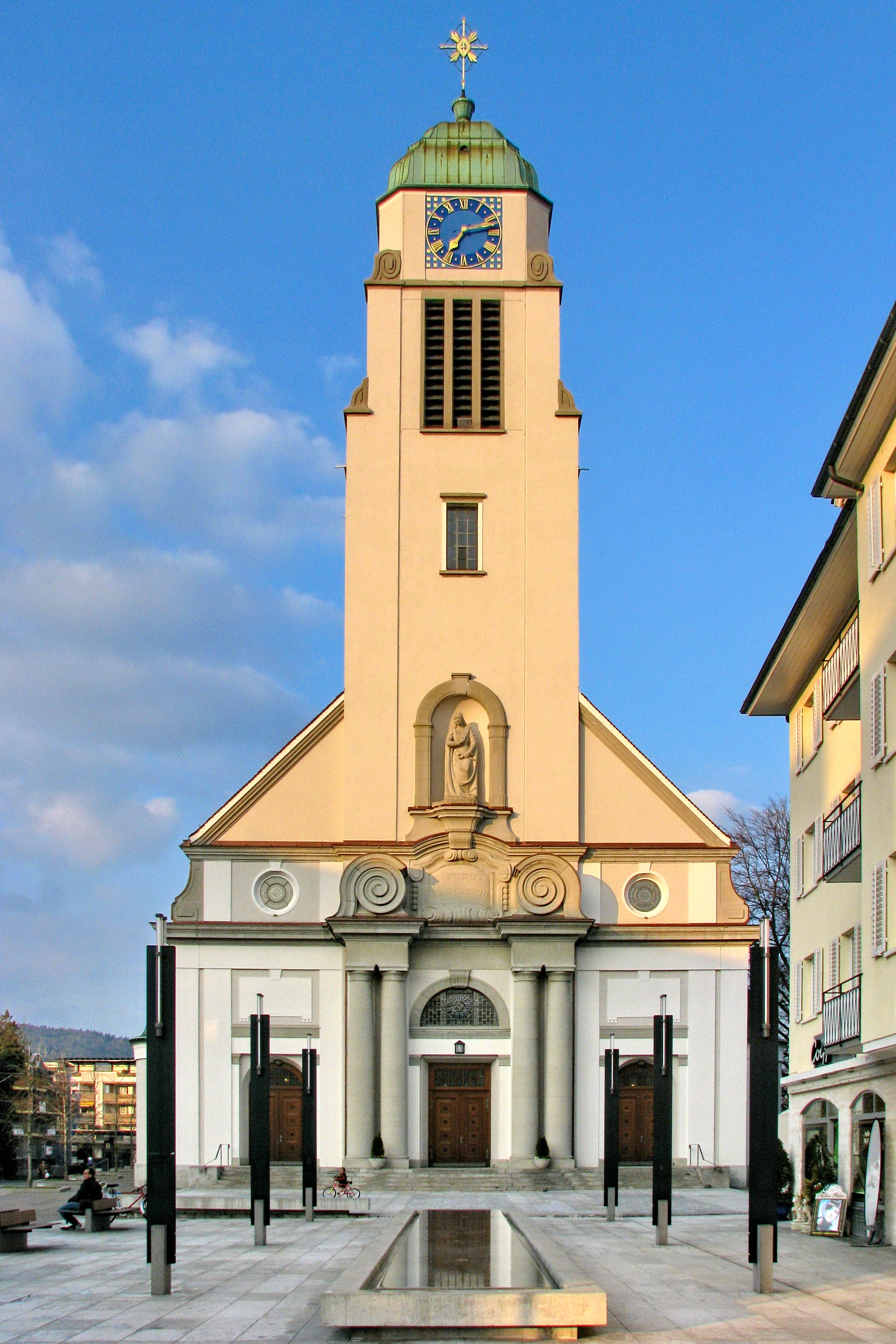
St. Agatha, the Roman Catholic Church (built in 1927)

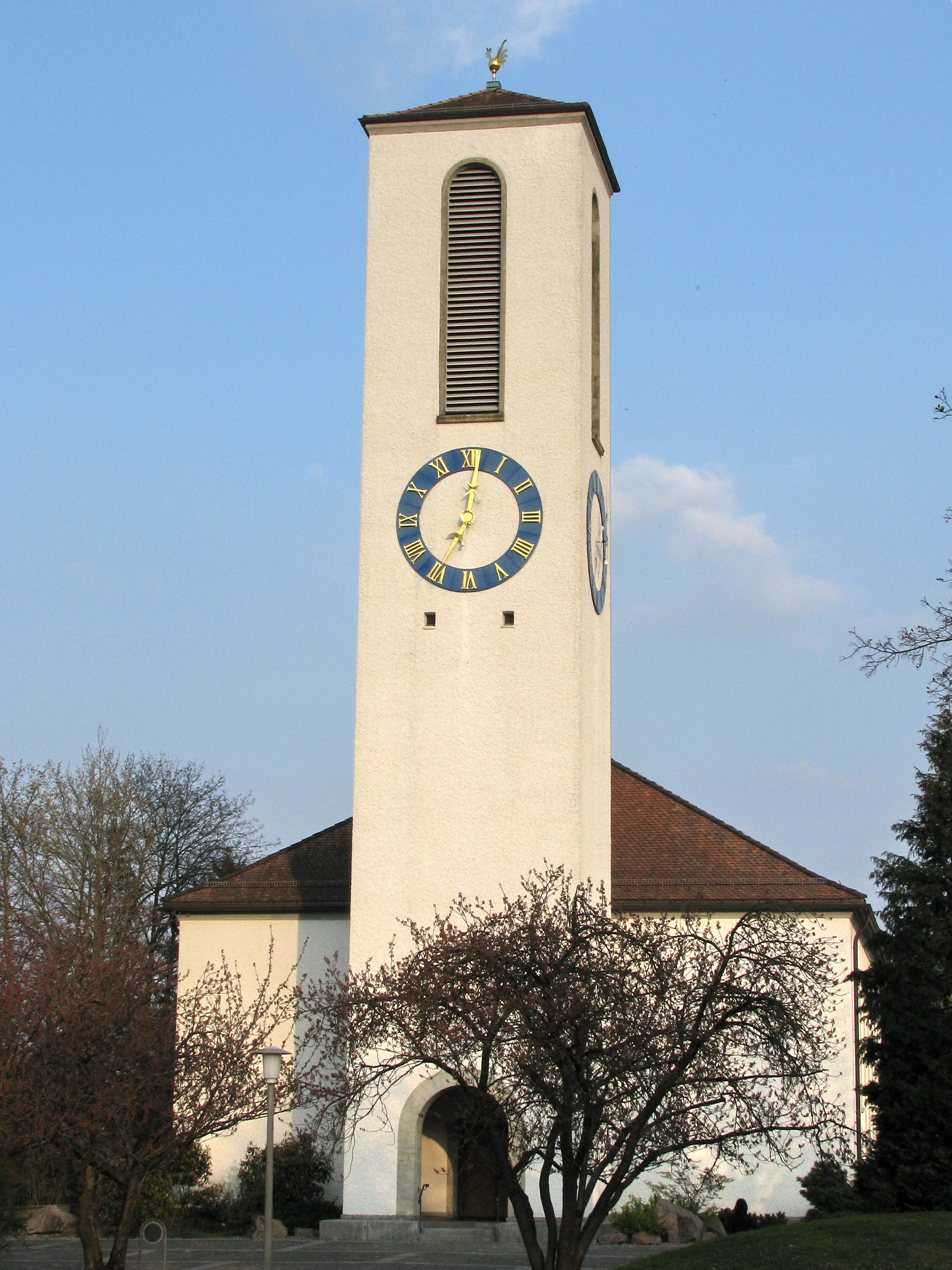
The Reformed church (built in 1925)

Dietikon has a population (as of 31 December 2020) of 28,057. As of 2007, 39.8% of the population was made up of foreign nationals. As of 2008 the gender distribution of the population was 50% male and 50% female. Over the last 10 years the population has grown at a rate of 10.5%. Most of the population (as of 2000) speaks German (73.9%), with Italian being second most common (8.9%) and Albanian being third (3.8%).

In the 2007 election the most popular party was the SVP which received 40.1% of the vote. The next three most popular parties were the SPS (19.9%), the CVP (13.7%) and the FDP (8%).

The age distribution of the population (as of 2000) is children and teenagers (0–19 years old) make up 21.3% of the population, while adults (20–64 years old) make up 64.7% and seniors (over 64 years old) make up 14%. In Dietikon about 60.1% of the population (between age 25-64) have completed either non-mandatory upper secondary education or additional higher education (either university or a Fachhochschule). There are 9,892 households in Dietikon.

Dietikon has an unemployment rate of 4.2%. As of 2005, there were 179 people employed in the primary economic sector and about 13 businesses involved in this sector. 2,613 people are employed in the secondary sector and there are 213 businesses in this sector. 10,632 people are employed in the tertiary sector, with 957 businesses in this sector. As of 2007 60.6% of the working population were employed full-time, and 39.4% were employed part-time.

As of 2008 there were 8,655 Catholics and 4,599 Protestants in Dietikon. In the 2000 census, religion was broken down into several smaller categories. From the 2000 census, 26.5% were some type of Protestant, with 24.6% belonging to the Swiss Reformed Church and 1.9% belonging to other Protestant churches. 41.8% of the population were Catholic. Of the rest of the population, 12.2% were Muslim, 16.1% belonged to another religion (not listed), 4.6% did not give a religion, and 9.4% were atheist or agnostic.

The historical population is given in the following table:

year	population
1779	686
1836	1,025
1850	1,291
1900	2,613
1910	4,493
1950	7,132
1960	14,920
1970	22,705
1990	21,152
2000	21,353
2017	27,079

== Economics and education ==
Among other companies, the Limmattaler Zeitung newspaper and Ex Libris are situated in Dietikon.

== Weather ==
Dietikon has an average of 132.2 days of rain per year and on average receives 1,078 mm (42.4 in) of precipitation. The wettest month is August during which time Dietikon receives an average of 114 mm (4.5 in) of precipitation. During the wettest month, there is precipitation for an average of 12.7 days.

== Visitor attractions ==
There's the Bruno Weber Park in Dietikon respectively Spreitenbach, one of the few sculpture gardens and Gesamtkunstwerks in Switzerland. Glanzenberg was once a settlement along the river Limmat, but its fortifications seem to never have been completed, and it might have been destroyed in 1267/68, a legend tells. Its remains are to be found in a little forest along the Limmat, opposite the railway station of the same name. Also situated there are the walls of the former Glanzenberg castle, built in the late 12th century AD by the Counts of Regensberg.

== Notable people ==
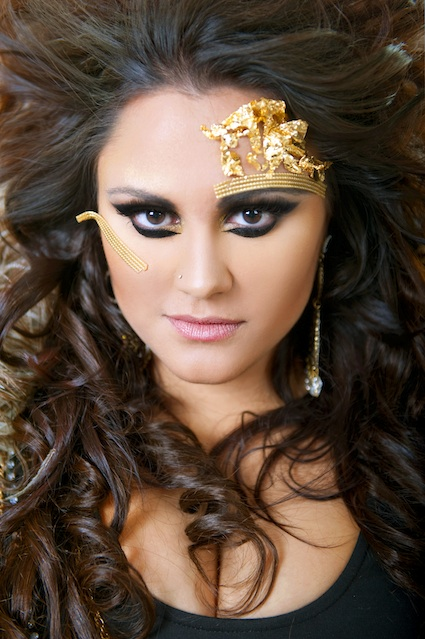
Diamá (aka Claudia D'Addio), 2008

- Bruno Weber (1931-2011) an artist and architect, specializing in fantastic realism
- Peter Schweri (1939-2016) artist, painter, illustrator, photographer and music composer
- Peter Vetsch (born 1943) an architect, known for building earth houses
- Urs Fischbacher (born 1959) an economist and professor of applied economic research at the University of Konstanz
- Markus Notter (born 1960) politician and former city president
- Josef Wiederkehr (born 1970) a businessman and politician
- Diamá (born 1980) also known as Claudia D'Addio, a singer, grew up in Dietikon

== Twin towns ==
Dietikon is twinned with the towns of

- Braggio, Graubünden, Switzerland
- Kolín, Czech Republic
- Renens, Vaud, Switzerland

== Gallery ==
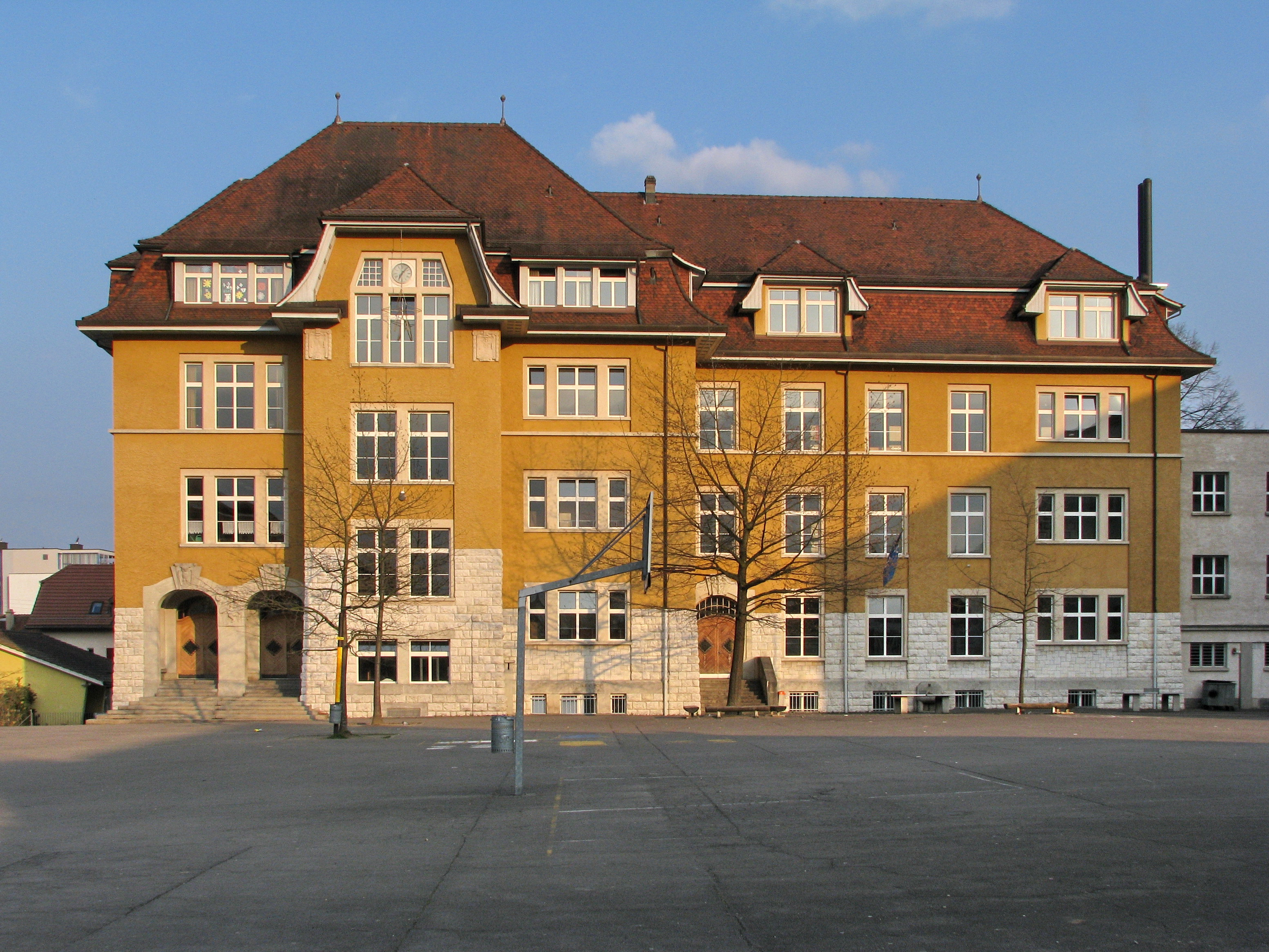
Zentralschulhaus building

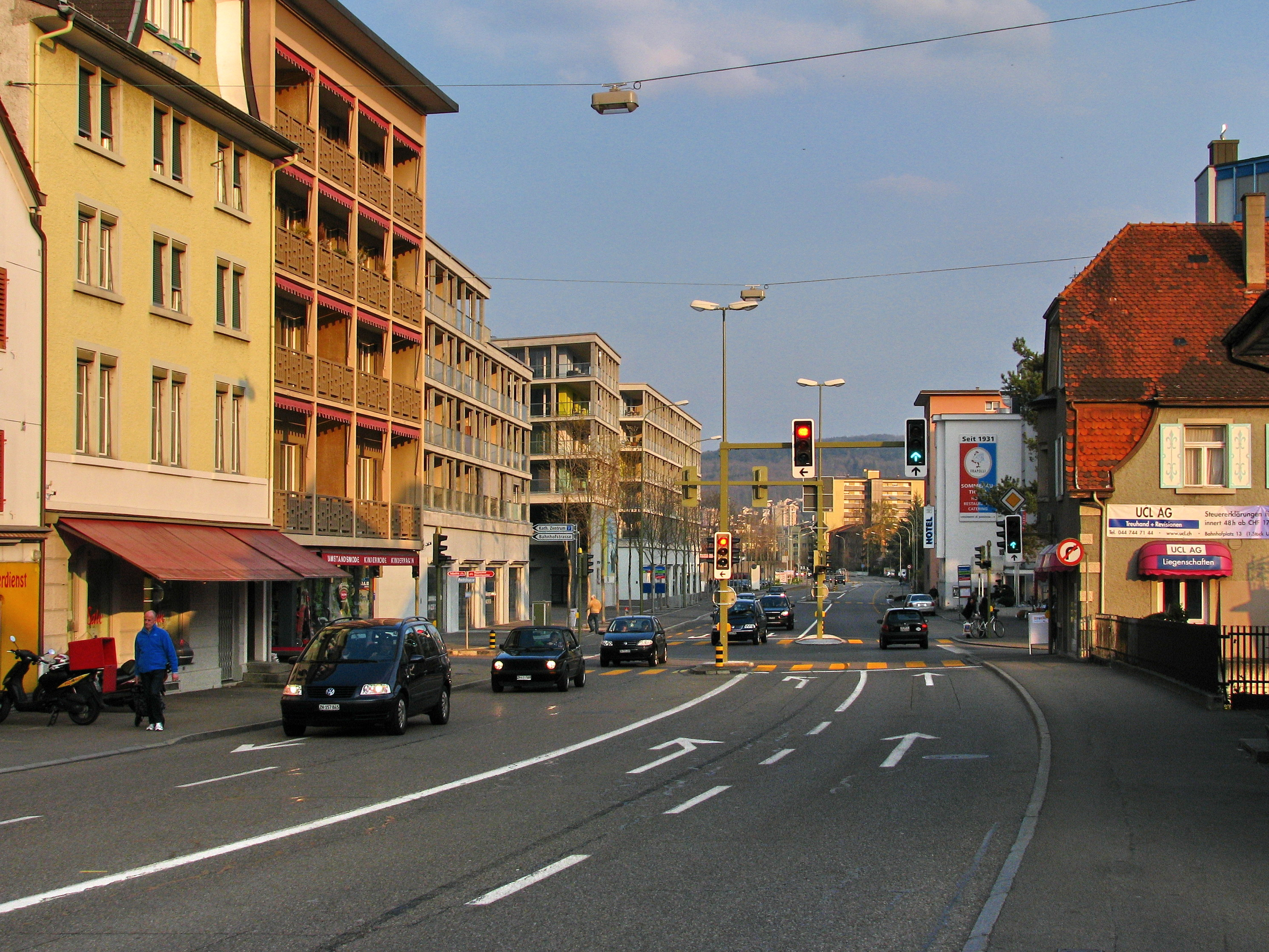
Zürcherstrasse towards Schlieren

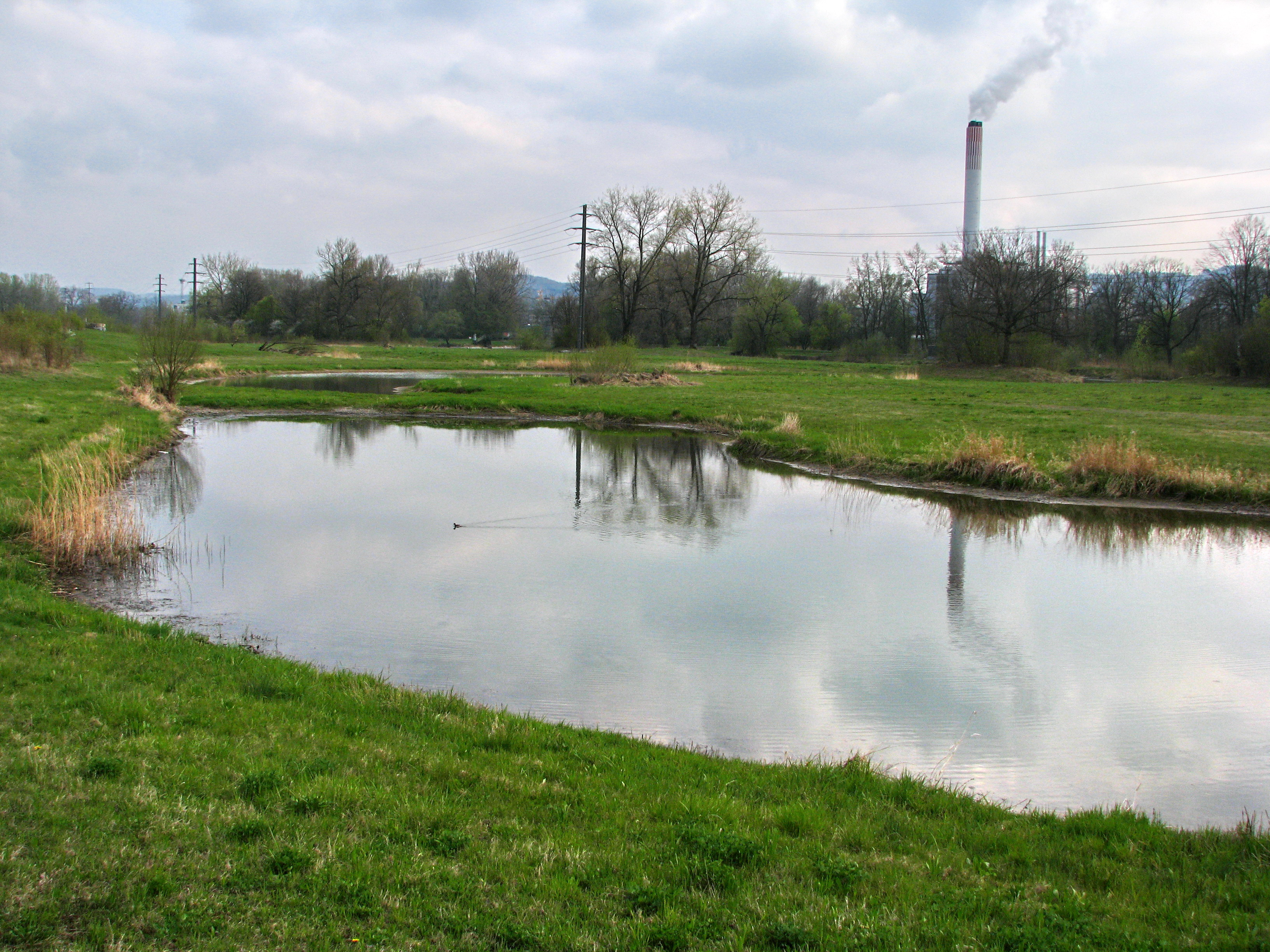
Protected area Dietiker & Geroldswiler Auen on the Limmat's shore

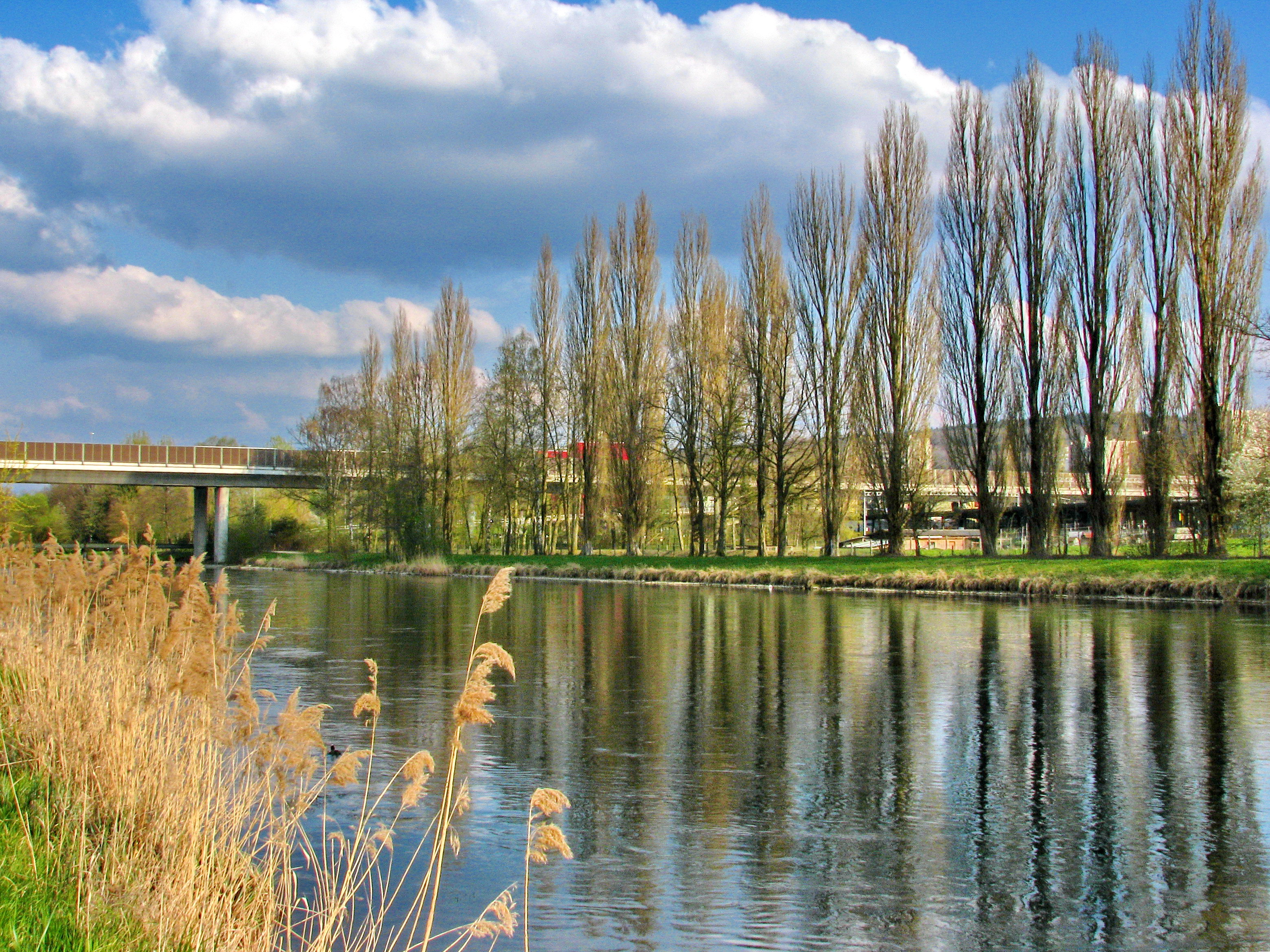
Hiking path at Glanzenberg train station

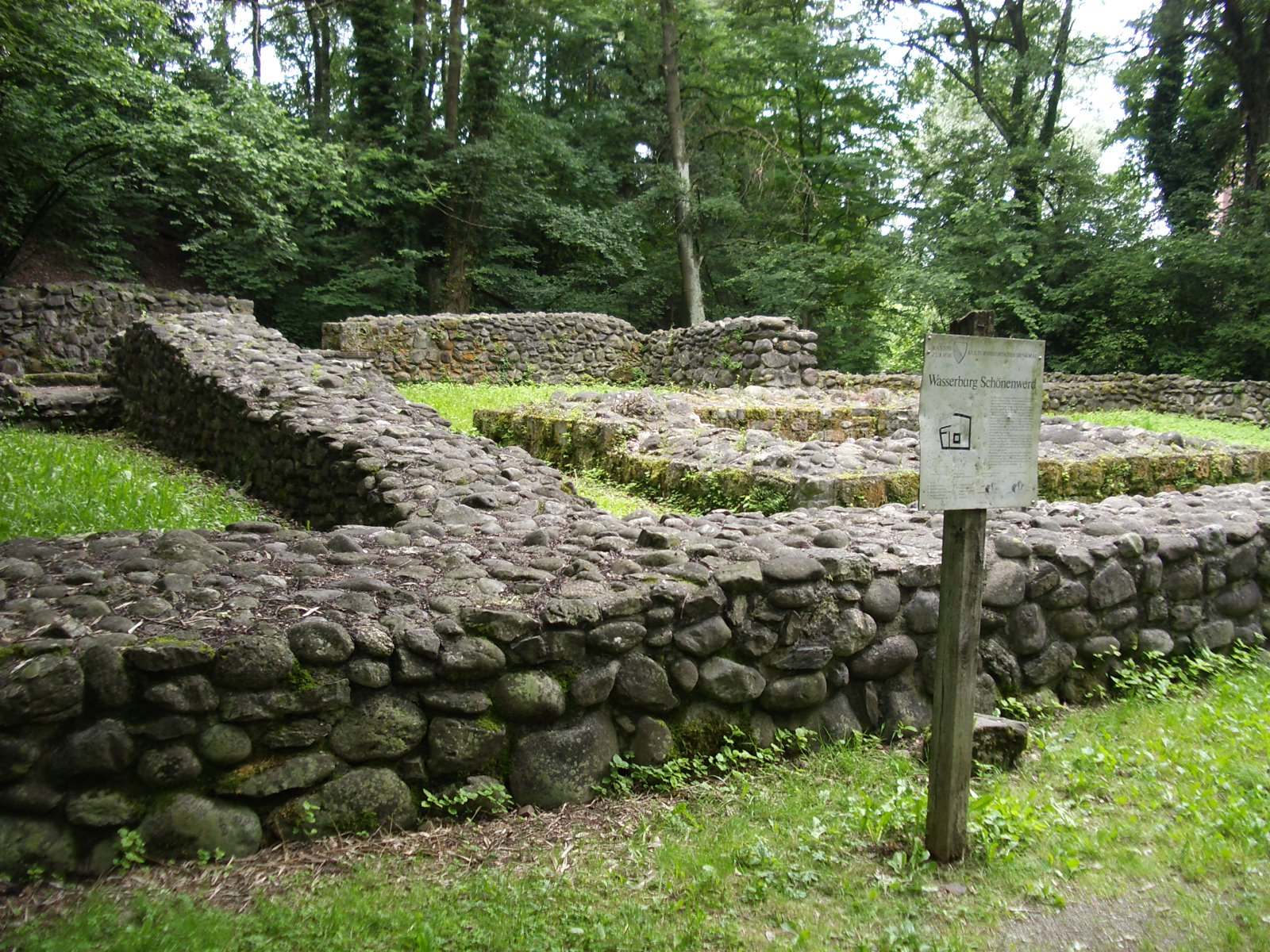
Ruins of the Schönenwerd water castle

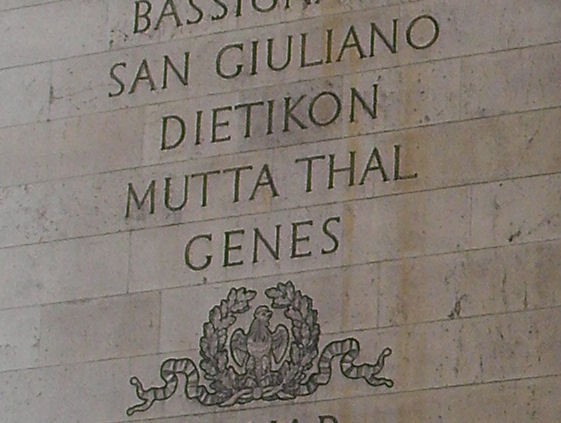
Dietikon as part of the inscription at the Arc de Triomphe in Paris referring to the Second Battle of Zurich in 1799

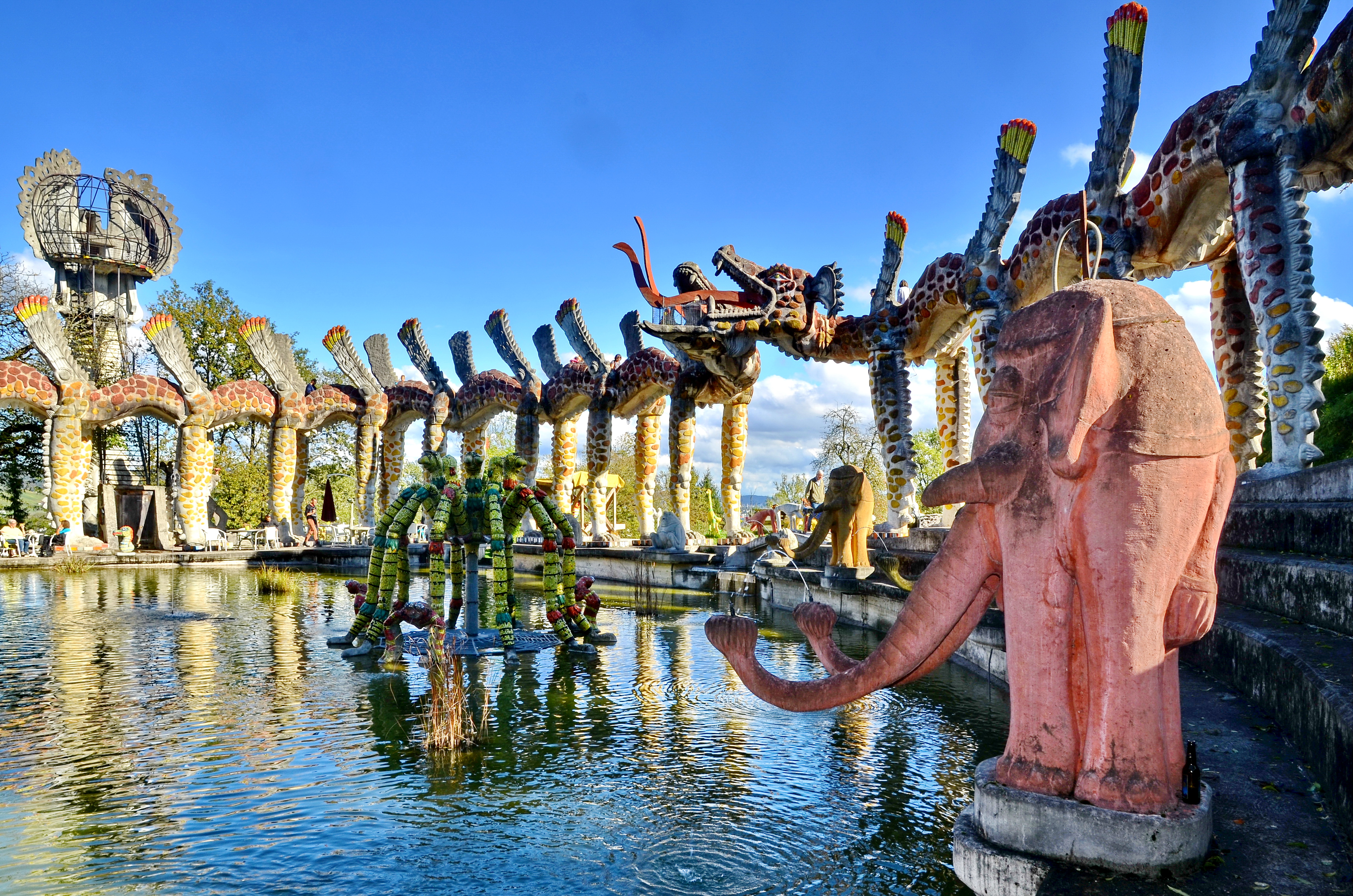
Bruno Weber Park

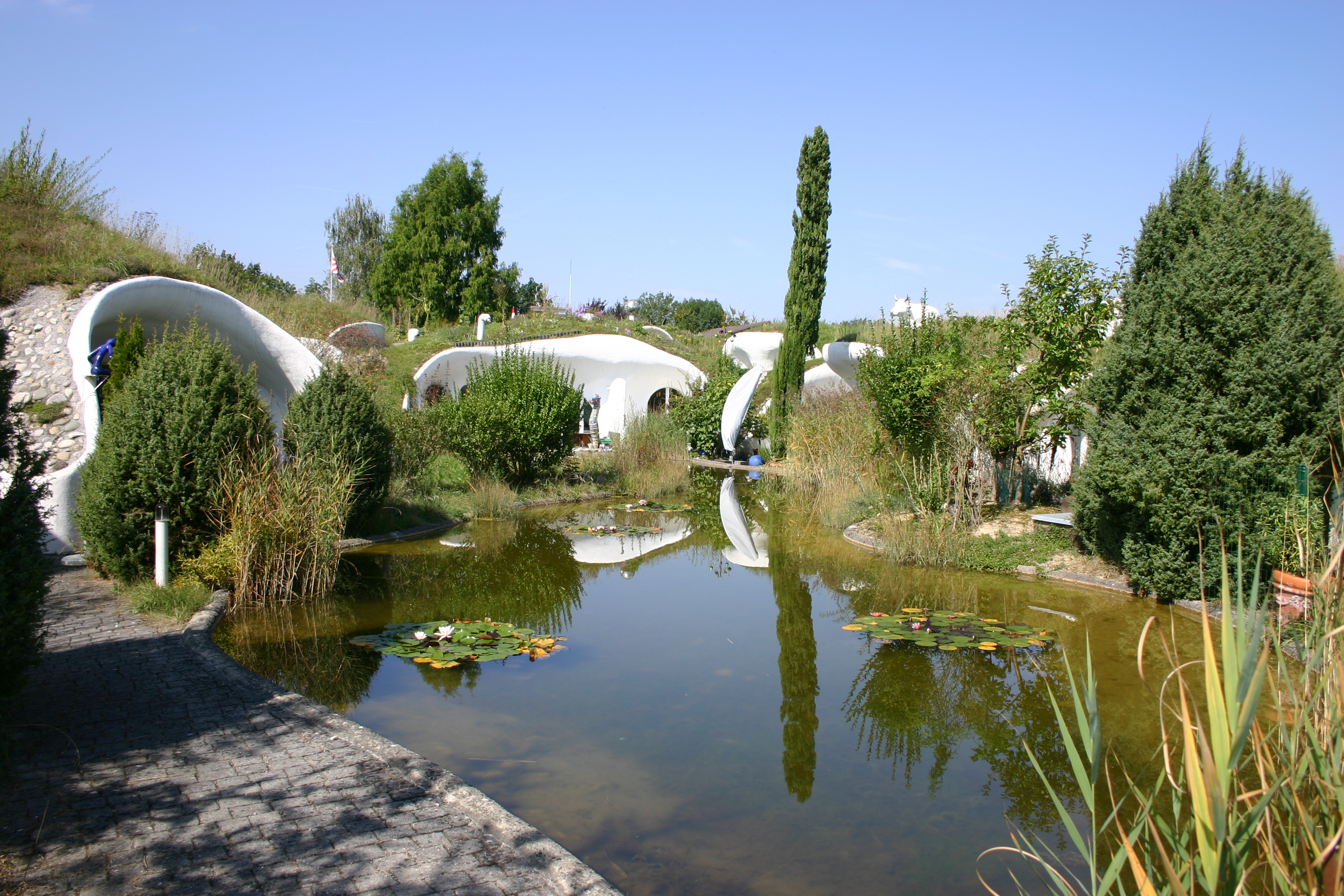
Earth house estate Lättenstrasse by Peter Vetsch
