= Unterlunkhofen =

- Municipality
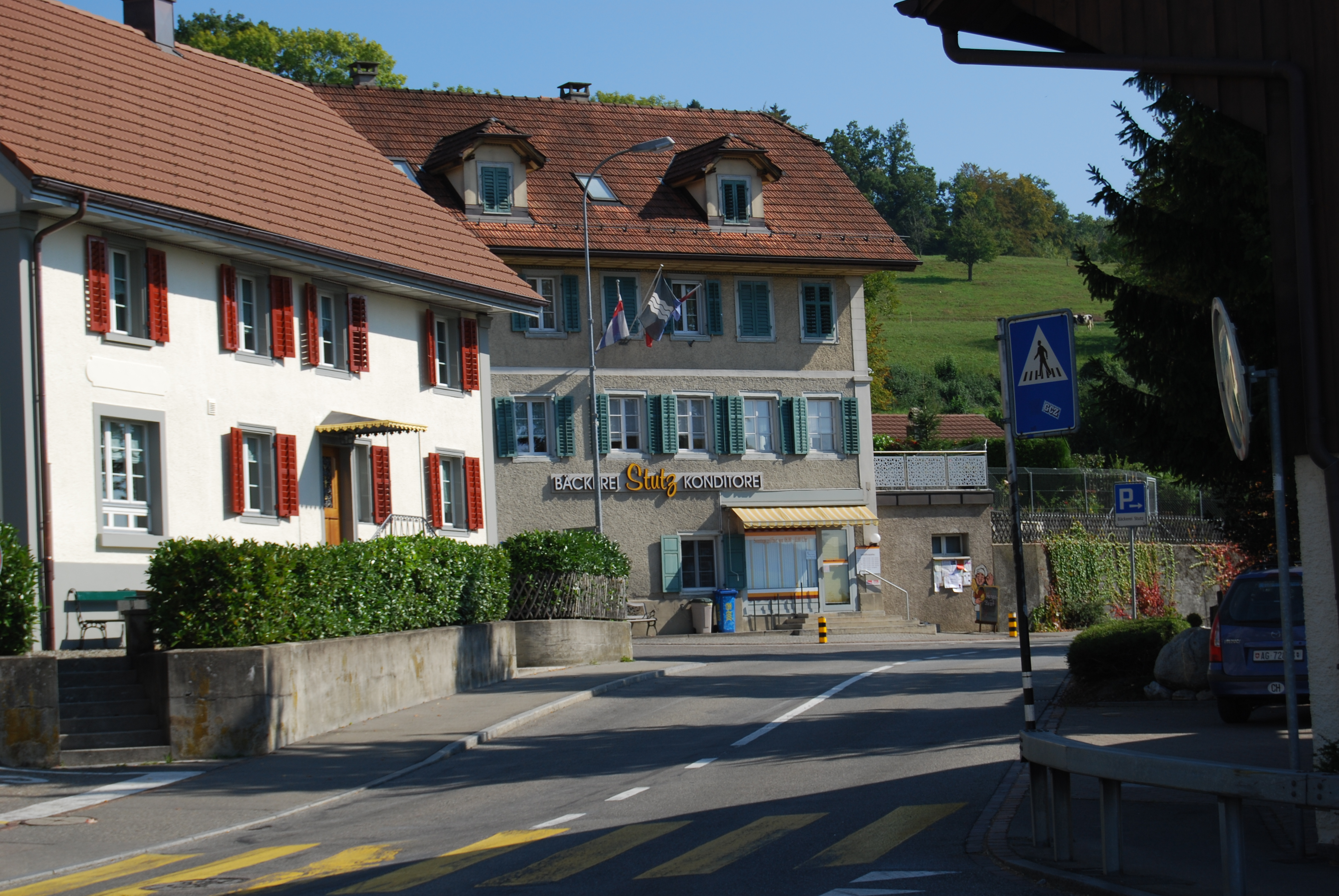

- Flag Coat of arms
- Location of Unterlunkhofen
- Location within Switzerland Location within Canton of Aargau
- Coordinates: 47°19′N 8°23′E
- Country: Switzerland
- Canton: Aargau
- District: Bremgarten

Area
  - Total: 4.49 km^{2} (1.73 sq mi)
- Elevation: 401 m (1,316 ft)

Population (December 2020)
  - Total: 1,499
  - Density: 334/km^{2} (865/sq mi)
- Time zone: UTC+01:00 (CET)
  - Summer (DST): UTC+02:00 (CEST)
- Postal code: 8918
- SFOS number: 4079
- ISO 3166 code: CH-AG
- Surrounded by: Arni, Hermetschwil-Staffeln, Oberlunkhofen, Oberwil-Lieli, Rottenschwil, Zufikon
- Website: unterlunkhofen.ch

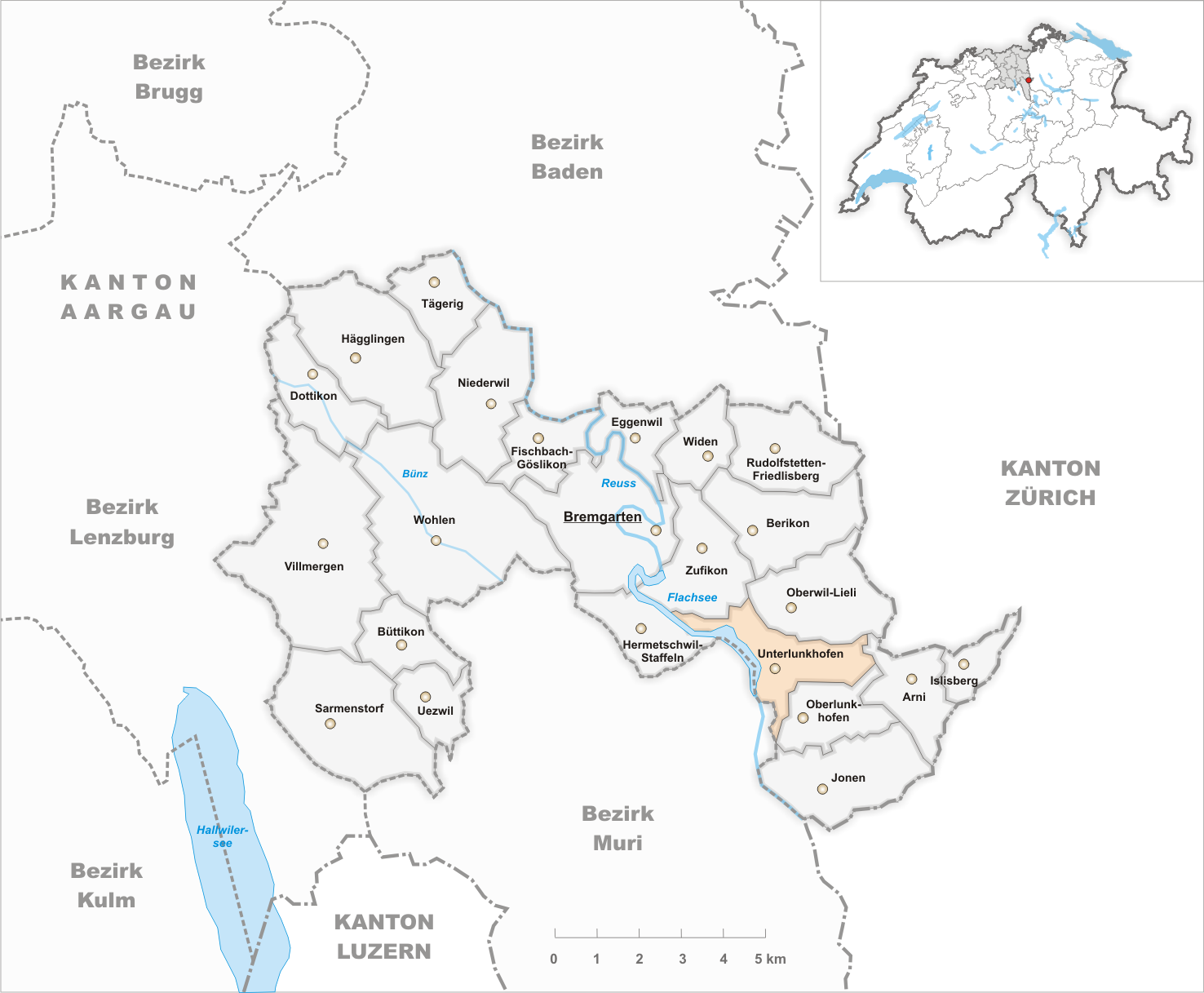
Unterlunkhofen

Unterlunkhofen is a municipality in the district of Bremgarten in the canton of Aargau in Switzerland.

== History ==
Since pre-Christian times people have inhabited the areas around Unterlunkhofen. Archeological digs document a settlement of the Geisshof area since the Neolithic Age (Horgen Culture, ca 2700-2400 BC). There are other significant discoveries from the early Iron Age (ca 800-450 BC), including the Bärhau burial site which is the largest of its kind in Switzerland. The area near the municipality also included a Roman era villa. In 1890 a Roman wall with marble facing and a magnificent six-color mosaic floor was excavated.

Alemannic settlement dates to the 7th century. Lunkhofen included the estates at Oberlunkhofen, Unterlunkhofen, Jonen, and Arni-Islisberg, recorded as Lunchunft in the 9th century. The ferry across the Reuss (mentioned 1160) was part of the main road connecting Zürich and Bern until the 16th century. The estates were in possession of Murbach Abbey, given as a fief to the Habsburgs in 1259 and was sold to Rudolf I of Germany in 1291. Lunkhofen remained under Habsburg control and was administered by the reeves of Trostberg until 1414, when jurisdiction was acquired by Bremgarten. After the conquest of Aargau in 1415, Lunkhofen fell to Zürich and was part of the bailiwick of Knonau until 1798. It was detached from Zürich and given to the newly formed canton of Aargau in 1803.

== Geography ==
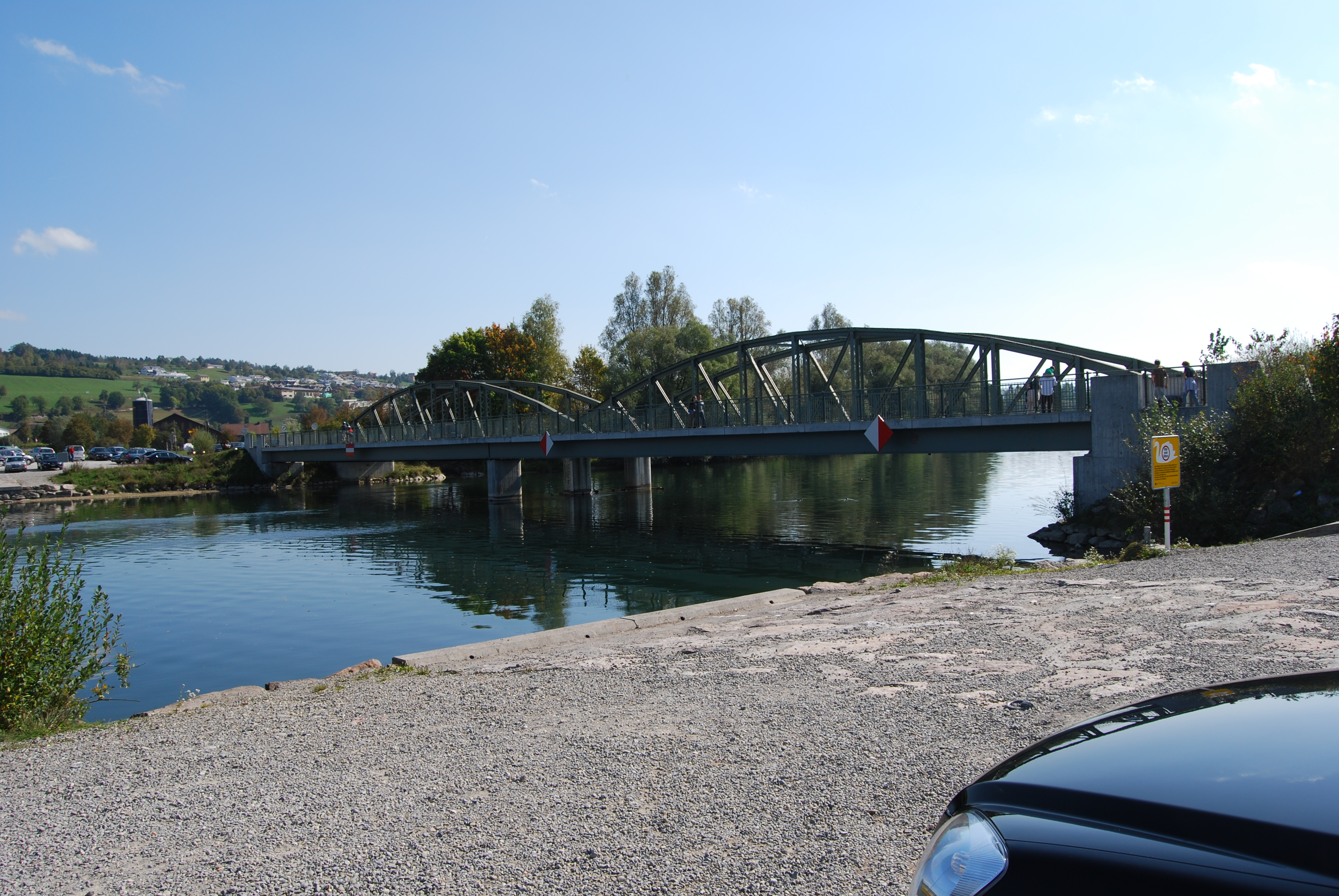
Reuss River at Unterlunkhofen

Unterlunkhofen has an area, as of 2006, of 4.5 square kilometers (1.7 sq mi). Of this area, 51.6% is used for agricultural purposes, while 26.6% is forested. Of the rest of the land, 8.5% is settled (buildings or roads) and the remainder (13.4%) is non-productive (rivers or lakes).

== Coat of arms ==
The blazon of the municipal coat of arms is Barry of Six Argent and Azure and overall a Pale Gules. The coat of arm was introduced in 1929, based on the coat of arms of Hugo of Lunkhofen, recorded in 1255. The same historical coat of arms was also adapted as municipal coat of arms for Zwillikon (Affoltern am Albis).

== Demographics ==
Unterlunkhofen has a population (as of 31 December 2020) of 1,499. As of 2008, 10.2% of the population was made up of foreign nationals. Over the last 10 years (1997–2007) the population has changed at a rate of 23%. Most of the population (as of 2000) speaks German (94.6%), with Italian being second most common ( 1.0%) and English being third ( 1.0%).

The age distribution, as of 2008, in Unterlunkhofen is; 141 children or 11.2% of the population are between 0 and 9 years old and 158 teenagers or 12.5% are between 10 and 19. Of the adult population, 149 people or 11.8% of the population are between 20 and 29 years old. 172 people or 13.6% are between 30 and 39, 249 people or 19.7% are between 40 and 49, and 203 people or 16.1% are between 50 and 59. The senior population distribution is 118 people or 9.4% of the population are between 60 and 69 years old, 56 people or 4.4% are between 70 and 79, there are 12 people or 1.0% who are between 80 and 89, and there are 3 people or 0.2% who are 90 and older. As of 2000, there were 22 homes with 1 or 2 persons in the household, 210 homes with 3 or 4 persons in the household, and 225 homes with 5 or more persons in the household. The average number of people per household was 2.61 individuals. In 2008 there were 224 single family homes (or 42.1% of the total) out of a total of 532 homes and apartments. There were a total of 8 empty apartments for a 1.5% vacancy rate. As of 2007, there was no new construction of housing units.

In the 2007 federal election the most popular party was the SVP which received 35.4% of the vote. The next three most popular parties were the CVP (22.2%), the SP (15.7%) and the FDP (11.9%).

In Unterlunkhofen about 86.4% of the population (between age 25-64) have completed either non-mandatory upper secondary education or additional higher education (either university or a Fachhochschule). Of the school age population (in the 2008/2009 school year), there are 99 students attending primary school in the municipality.

The historical population is given in the following table:

Historical population
Year	Pop.	±%
1975	399	—
1980	415	+4.0%
1990	758	+82.7%
2000	1,235	+62.9%

== Heritage sites of national significance ==
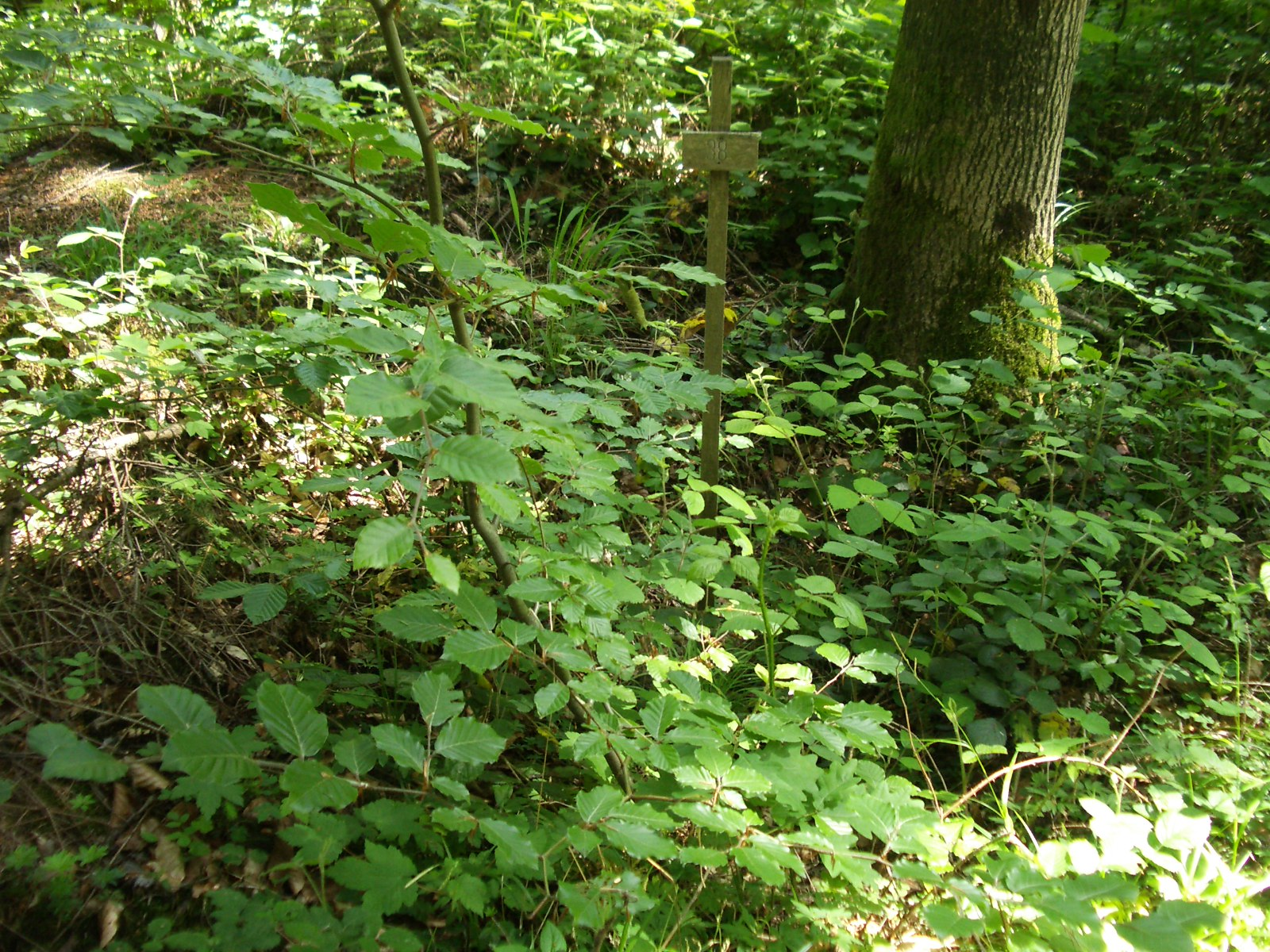
One of the burial mounds

The Bärhau, an Iron Age burial site, which with 63 graves is the largest of its kind in Switzerland, is listed as a Swiss heritage site of national significance. The Bärhau was discovered and explored from 1865 to 1900 in several stages. Each of the burial mounds (tumuli) are about 1.2 m (3.9 ft) high and have an average diameter of 12 m (39 ft) and are located close to each other. In addition to the remains of human skeletons were found grave goods such as bronze jewelry, tools and small weapons. The finds are kept in the National Museum in Zurich and in Vindonissa museum in Brugg. Today, the early Celtic burial mounds are in a forest area and are therefore difficult to detect.

== Economy ==
As of 2007, Unterlunkhofen had an unemployment rate of 1.25%. As of 2005, there were 37 people employed in the primary economic sector and about 17 businesses involved in this sector. 128 people are employed in the secondary sector and there are 11 businesses in this sector. 78 people are employed in the tertiary sector, with 26 businesses in this sector.

As of 2000 there was a total of 694 workers who lived in the municipality. Of these, 583 or about 84.0% of the residents worked outside Unterlunkhofen while 120 people commuted into the municipality for work. There were a total of 231 jobs (of at least 6 hours per week) in the municipality. Of the working population, 16.9% used public transportation to get to work, and 60.2% used a private car.

== Religion ==
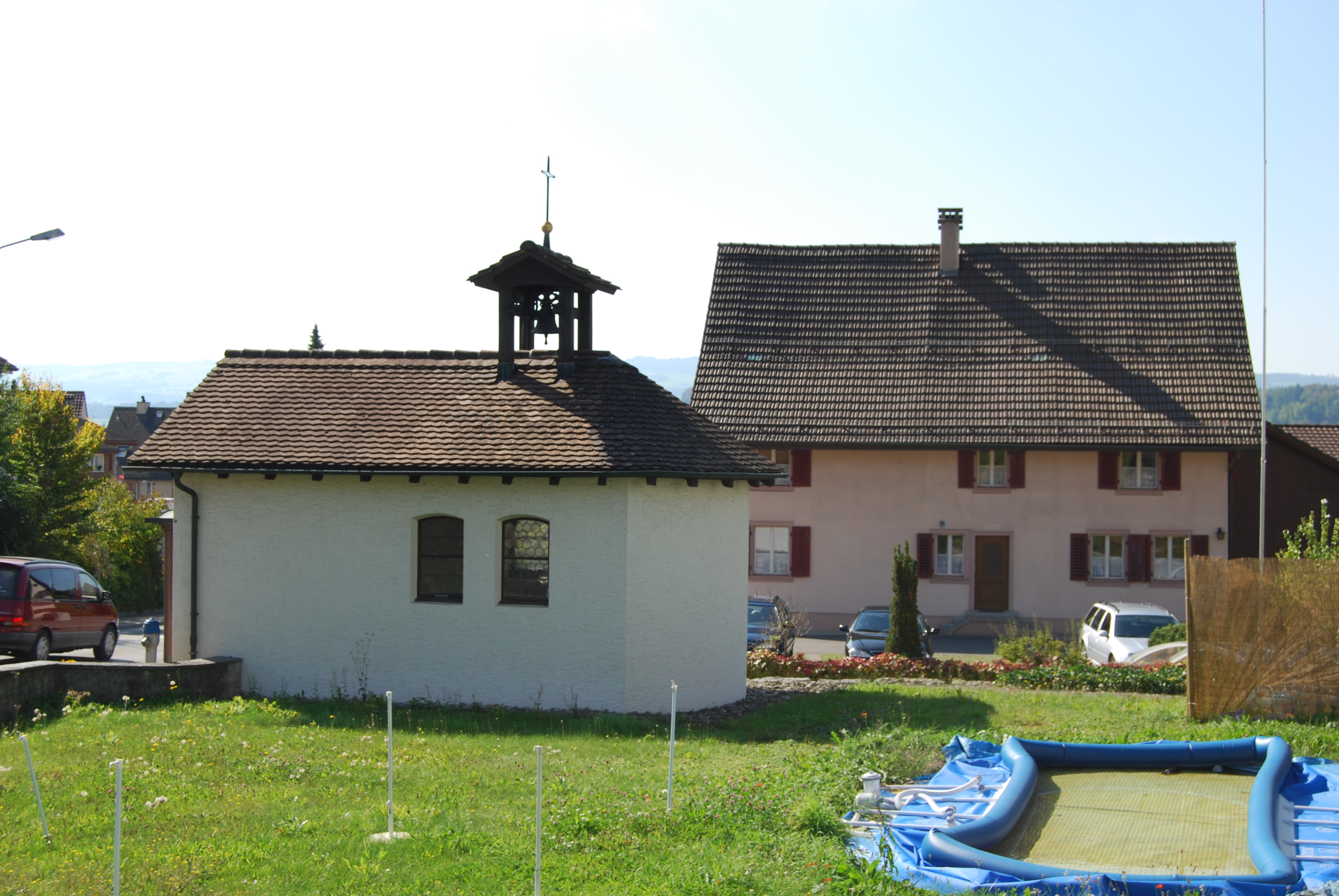
Chapel in Unterlunkhofen

From the 2000 census, 636 or 51.8% were Roman Catholic, while 377 or 30.7% belonged to the Swiss Reformed Church.
