= Arni-Islisberg =

Former municipality of Aargau, Switzerland

Coordinates: 47°19′5.62″N 8°25′9.49″E

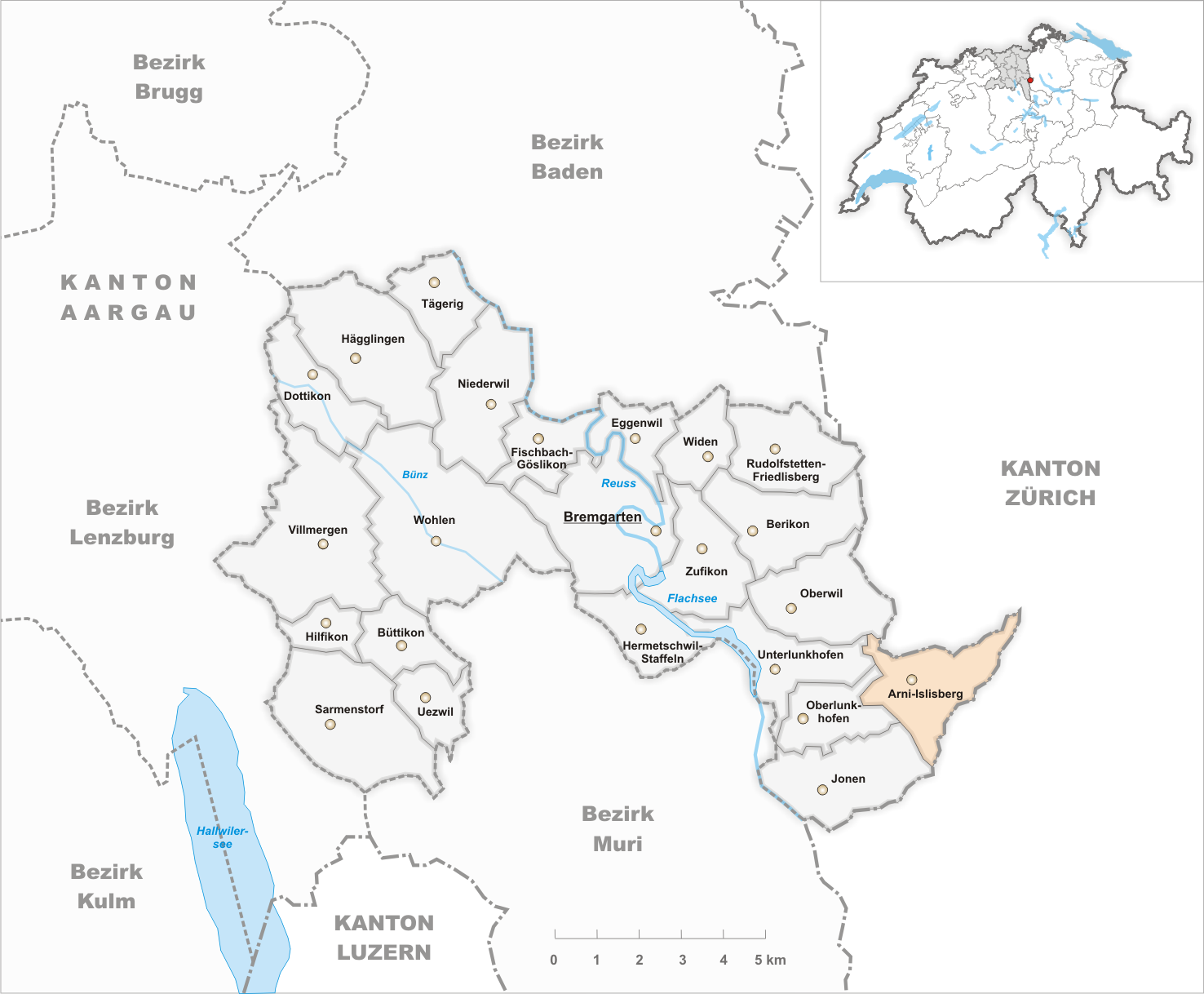
Arni-Islisberg on the map (1982)

Arni-Islisberg is a former municipality in the district of Bremgarten in the canton of Aargau, Switzerland.

It was created in 1803. It ceased to exist in 1983, when it was split into the two new municipalities Arni and Islisberg.
