= Oberlunkhofen =

- Municipality
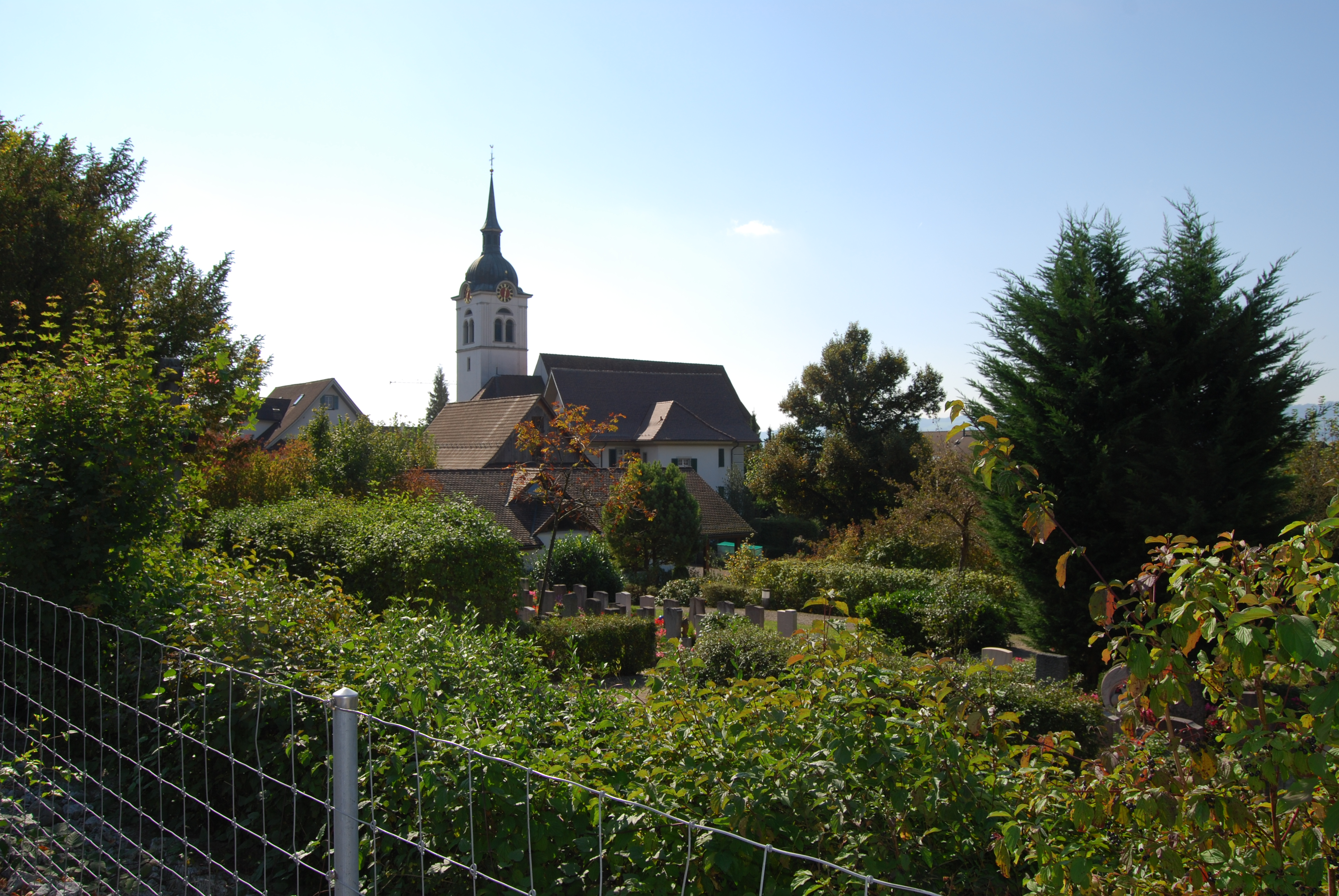

- Flag Coat of arms
- Location of Oberlunkhofen
- Location within Switzerland Location within Canton of Aargau
- Coordinates: 47°19′N 8°23′E
- Country: Switzerland
- Canton: Aargau
- District: Bremgarten

Area
  - Total: 3.25 km^{2} (1.25 sq mi)
- Elevation: 442 m (1,450 ft)

Population (December 2020)
  - Total: 2,079
  - Density: 640/km^{2} (1,660/sq mi)
- Time zone: UTC+01:00 (CET)
  - Summer (DST): UTC+02:00 (CEST)
- Postal code: 8917
- SFOS number: 4073
- ISO 3166 code: CH-AG
- Surrounded by: Arni, Jonen, Rottenschwil, Unterlunkhofen
- Website: oberlunkhofen.ch

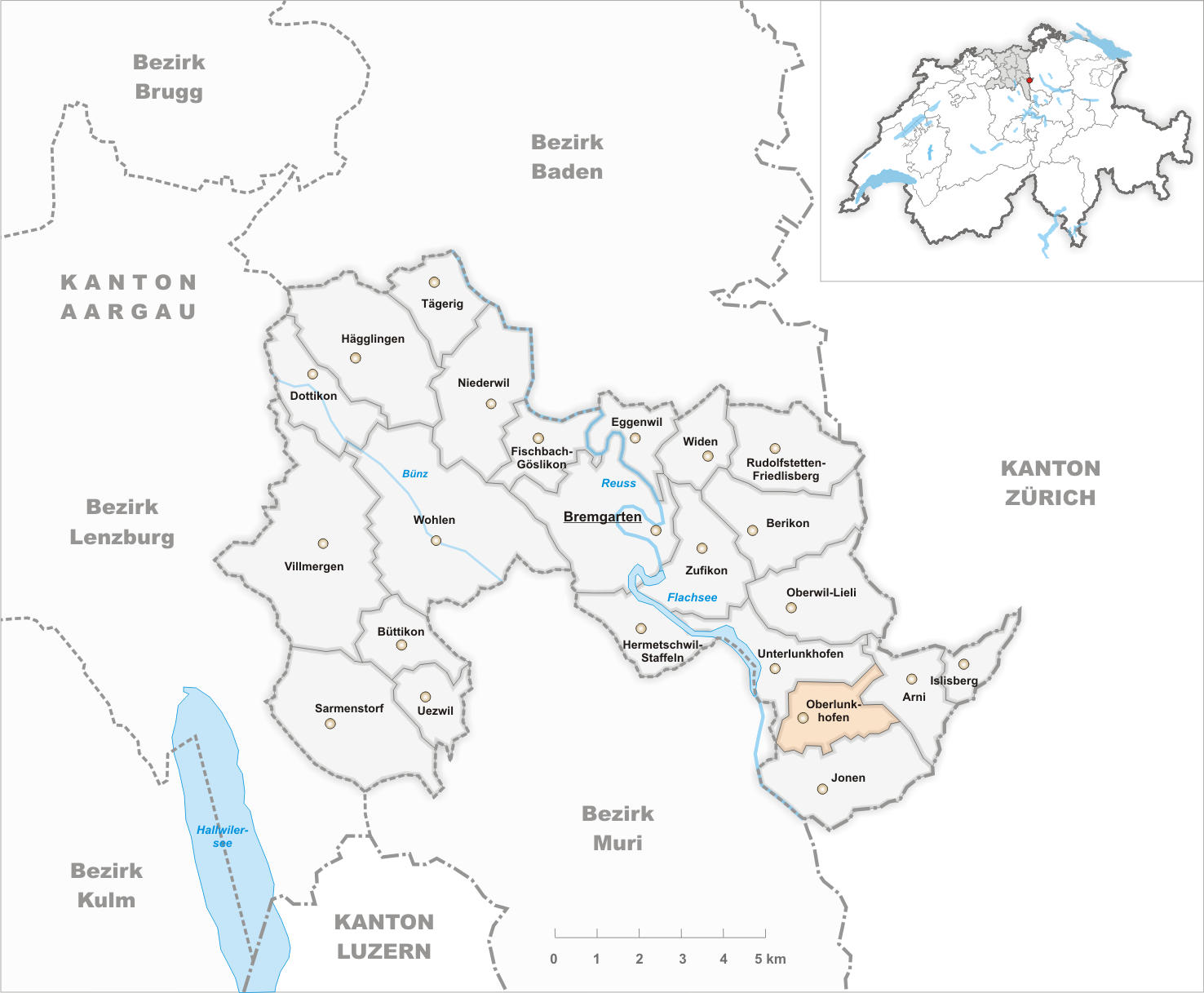
Oberlunkhofen

Oberlunkhofen is a municipality in the district of Bremgarten, in the canton of Aargau in Switzerland. Situated on a southern ridge of the Heitersberg hills along the right bank of the Reuss river, the municipality covers an area of 3.25 square kilometres (1.25 sq mi) and has a population of approximately 2,200.

== History ==
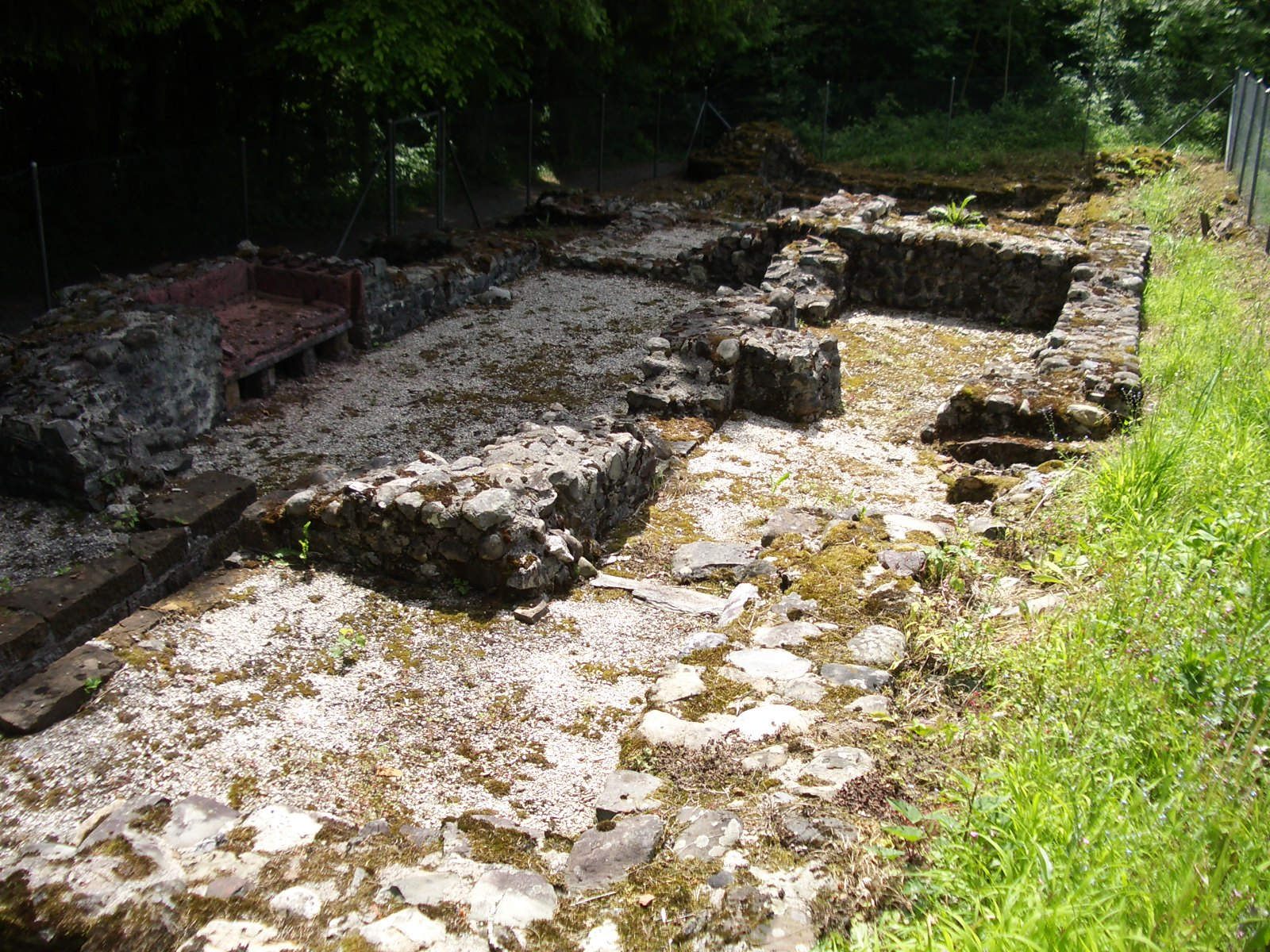
Roman ruins in Oberlunkhofen

The earliest signs of a settlement in Oberlunkhofen are scattered Bronze Age items. In Schalchmatthau there is the foundation of a rectangular Roman era farm with a portico and flanked by two wings. Also from the Roman era, there is a 1st–3rd century villa and a bathhouse with heated rooms. Near the villa, an Alemanni graveyard was also discovered. During initial excavation, the wall remains were uncovered in 1897–98. Then, between 1975 and 1980 the wall ruins were preserved.

The modern village of Oberlunkhofen is first mentioned in the 9th century as Lunchunft though this record comes from an 11th-century copy of the original, older document. In 1232 it was mentioned as Lunchuft and in 1309 as obern Lunchuft. There was a castle near the village, but no surviving records mention it. It was presumably destroyed in 1386.

The village was owned by St. Leodegar in Lucerne which was under the jurisdiction of Murbach Abbey and was sold in 1291 to the House of Habsburg. In the early 14th century is a center of the Habsburg region of Kelleramt. The rights to the low justice and the vogtei fell on Bremgarten in 1414. In 1415, the rights to high justice went to Zurich. In 1797 Bremgarten sold the village to the other four municipalities of the Kelleramt. In 1798 it became part of the short-lived Helvetic Republic Canton of Baden.

St. Leodegar, the parish church of the Kelleramt, was first mentioned in 1185. The church was under the jurisdiction of St. Leodegar in Lucerne and then Murbach Abbey. In 1291 it went to the Habsburgs, and in 1403 was awarded Muri Abbey which held it until 1841. The parish included Oberlunkhofen, Unterlunkhofen, Arni, Islisberg and Rottenschwil. The current parish church was built in 1685 on the site of a 1515 church building. The oldest church building on that site probably dates from the 10th century.

Until the 20th century the major industries were agriculture and viticulture. In 1920 the bus line Oberlunkhofen-Jonen-Affoltern am Albis opened. Then in 1930 the line Birmenstorf-Oberlunkhofen opened. This line expanded in 1966 Zurich-Wiedikon. The increase in population after 1980 is due people moving away from the Zurich agglomeration.

== Geography ==
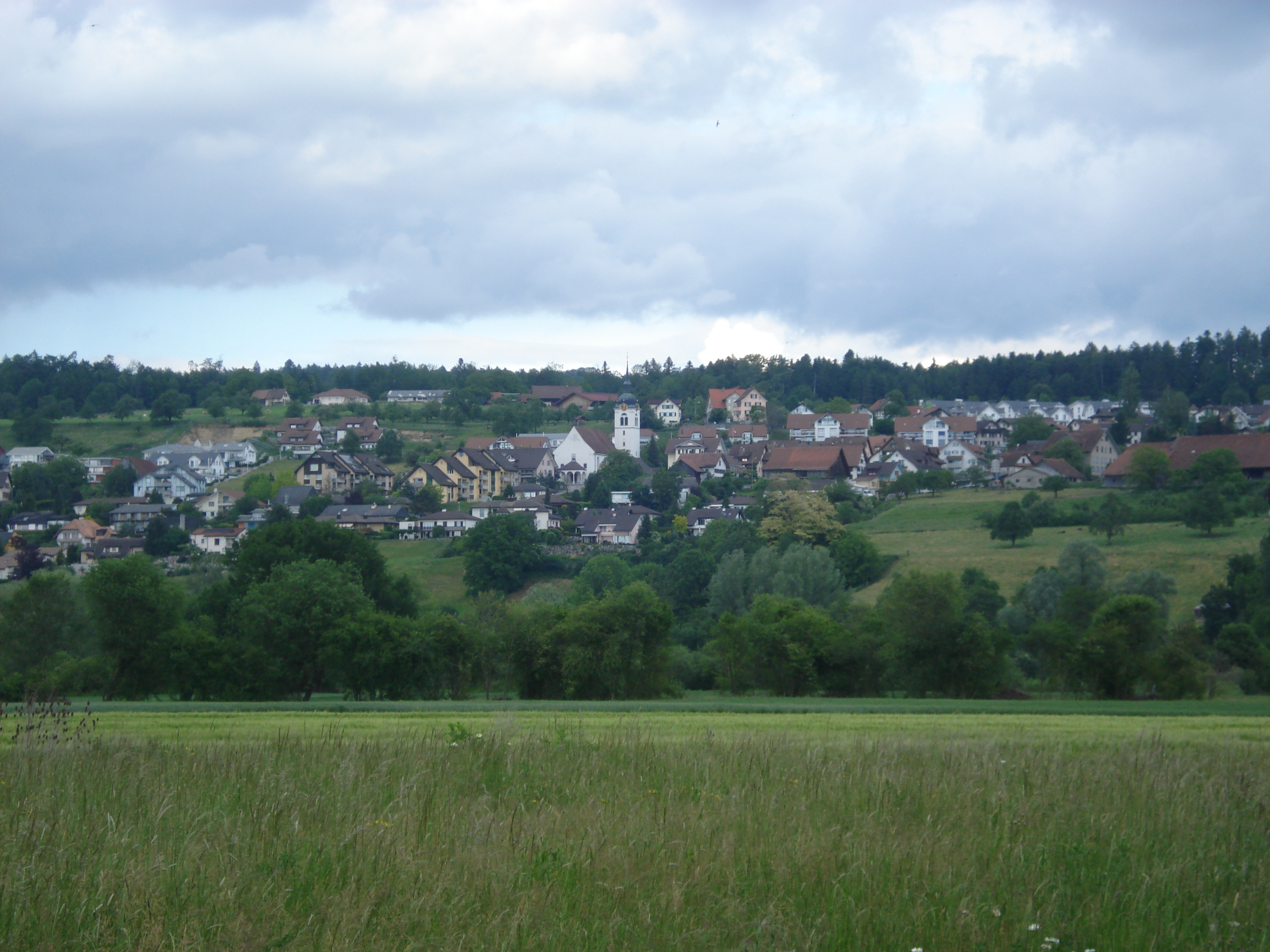
Oberlunkhofen

Oberlunkhofen has an area, as of 2006, of 3.3 square kilometers (1.3 sq mi). Of this area, 56.5% is used for agricultural purposes, while 24% is forested. Of the rest of the land, 15.8% is settled (buildings or roads) and the remainder (3.6%) is non-productive (rivers or lakes).

The municipality is located in the Bremgarten district on a southern ridge of the Heitersberg above the right bank of the Reuss river.

== Coat of arms ==
The blazon of the municipal coat of arms is Per fess Or a Lion passant Sable armed and langued Gules and Gules two Keys in saltire Argent.

== Demographics ==
Aerial view by Walter Mittelholzer (1923)

Oberlunkhofen has a population (as of 31 December 2020) of 2,079. As of 2008, 10.4% of the population was made up of foreign nationals. Over the last 10 years the population has grown at a rate of 26.4%. Most of the population (as of 2000) speaks German (93.6%), with English being second most common ( 1.5%) and Albanian being third ( 1.5%).

The age distribution, as of 2008, in Oberlunkhofen is; 198 children or 10.8% of the population are between 0 and 9 years old and 182 teenagers or 10.0% are between 10 and 19. Of the adult population, 196 people or 10.7% of the population are between 20 and 29 years old. 244 people or 13.4% are between 30 and 39, 357 people or 19.6% are between 40 and 49, and 294 people or 16.1% are between 50 and 59. The senior population distribution is 212 people or 11.6% of the population are between 60 and 69 years old, 102 people or 5.6% are between 70 and 79, there are 37 people or 2.0% who are between 80 and 89, and there are 4 people or 0.2% who are 90 and older.

As of 2000 the average number of residents per living room was 0.55 which is about equal to the cantonal average of 0.57 per room. In this case, a room is defined as space of a housing unit of at least 4 m^{2} (43 sq ft) as normal bedrooms, dining rooms, living rooms, kitchens and habitable cellars and attics. About 52.2% of the total households were owner occupied, or in other words did not pay rent (though they may have a mortgage or a rent-to-own agreement). As of 2000, there were 39 homes with 1 or 2 persons in the household, 273 homes with 3 or 4 persons in the household, and 253 homes with 5 or more persons in the household. The average number of people per household was 2.42 individuals. In 2008 there were 289 single family homes (or 38.8% of the total) out of a total of 744 homes and apartments. There were a total of 4 empty apartments for a 0.5% vacancy rate. As of 2007, the construction rate of new housing units was 1.2 new units per 1000 residents.

In the 2007 federal election the most popular party was the SVP which received 37% of the vote. The next three most popular parties were the CVP (19.2%), the FDP (14.3%) and the SP (14.2%).

In Oberlunkhofen about 86.6% of the population (between age 25 and 64) have completed either non-mandatory upper secondary education or additional higher education (either university or a Fachhochschule). Of the school age population (in the 2008/2009 school year), there are 131 students attending primary school in the municipality.

The historical population is given in the following table:

Historical population
Year	Pop.	±%
1850	490	—
1900	438	−10.6%
1950	413	−5.7%
1980	723	+75.1%
2000	1,443	+99.6%

== Heritage sites of national significance ==
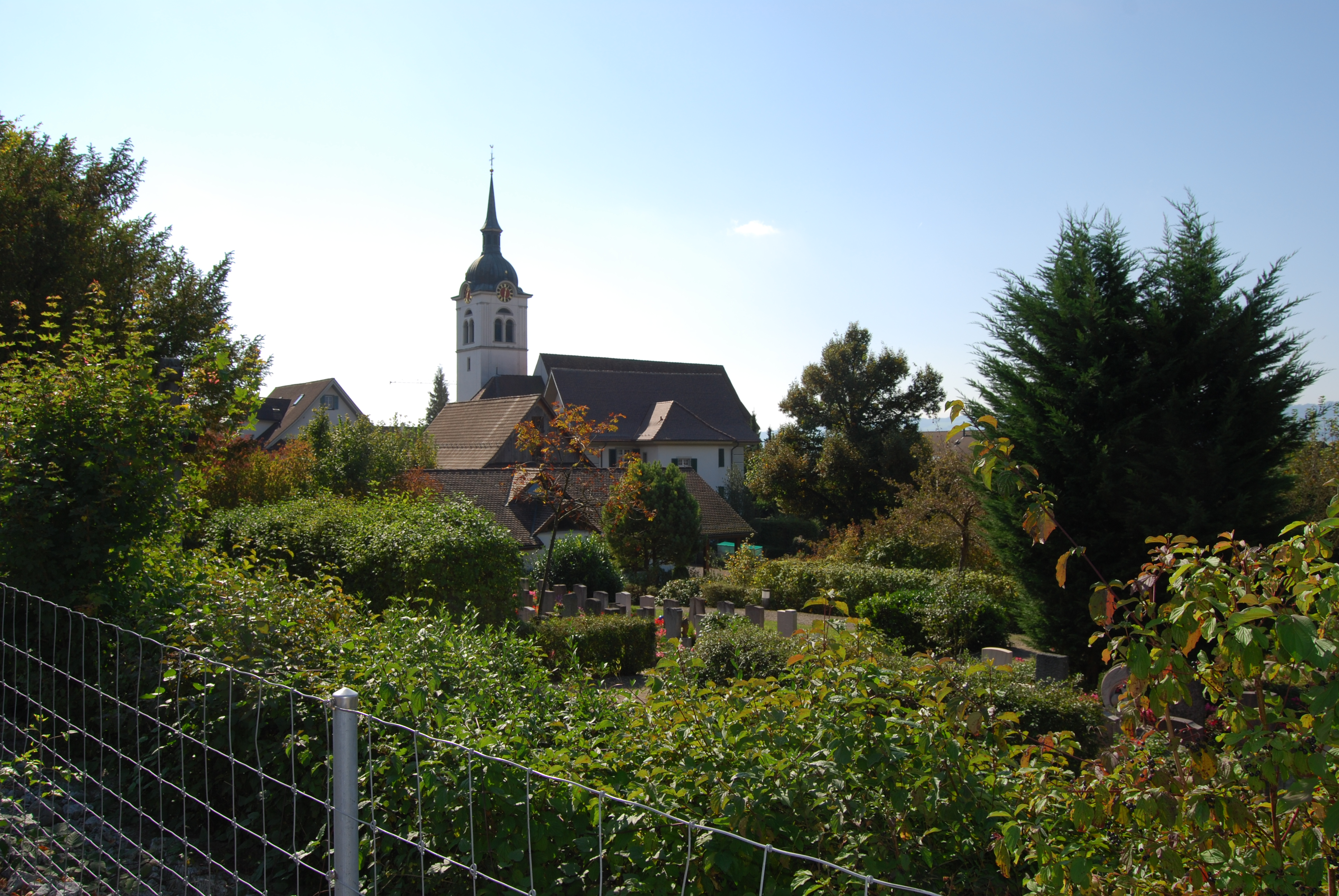
Church of Oberlunkhofen

The Catholic parish church on Chileweg is listed as a Swiss heritage site of national significance.

== Economy ==
As of 2007, Oberlunkhofen had an unemployment rate of 1.86%. As of 2005, there were 44 people employed in the primary economic sector and about 16 businesses involved in this sector. 89 people are employed in the secondary sector and there are 14 businesses in this sector. 202 people are employed in the tertiary sector, with 54 businesses in this sector.

As of 2000 there was a total of 815 workers who lived in the municipality. Of these, 653 or about 80.1% of the residents worked outside Oberlunkhofen while 170 people commuted into the municipality for work. There were a total of 332 jobs (of at least 6 hours per week) in the municipality. Of the working population, 21% used public transportation to get to work, and 53.7% used a private car.

== Religion ==
From the 2000 census, 732 or 50.7% were Roman Catholic, while 414 or 28.7% belonged to the Swiss Reformed Church. Of the rest of the population, there were 3 individuals (or about 0.21% of the population) who belonged to the Christian Catholic faith.
