= Arni, Aargau =

Arni
- Municipality
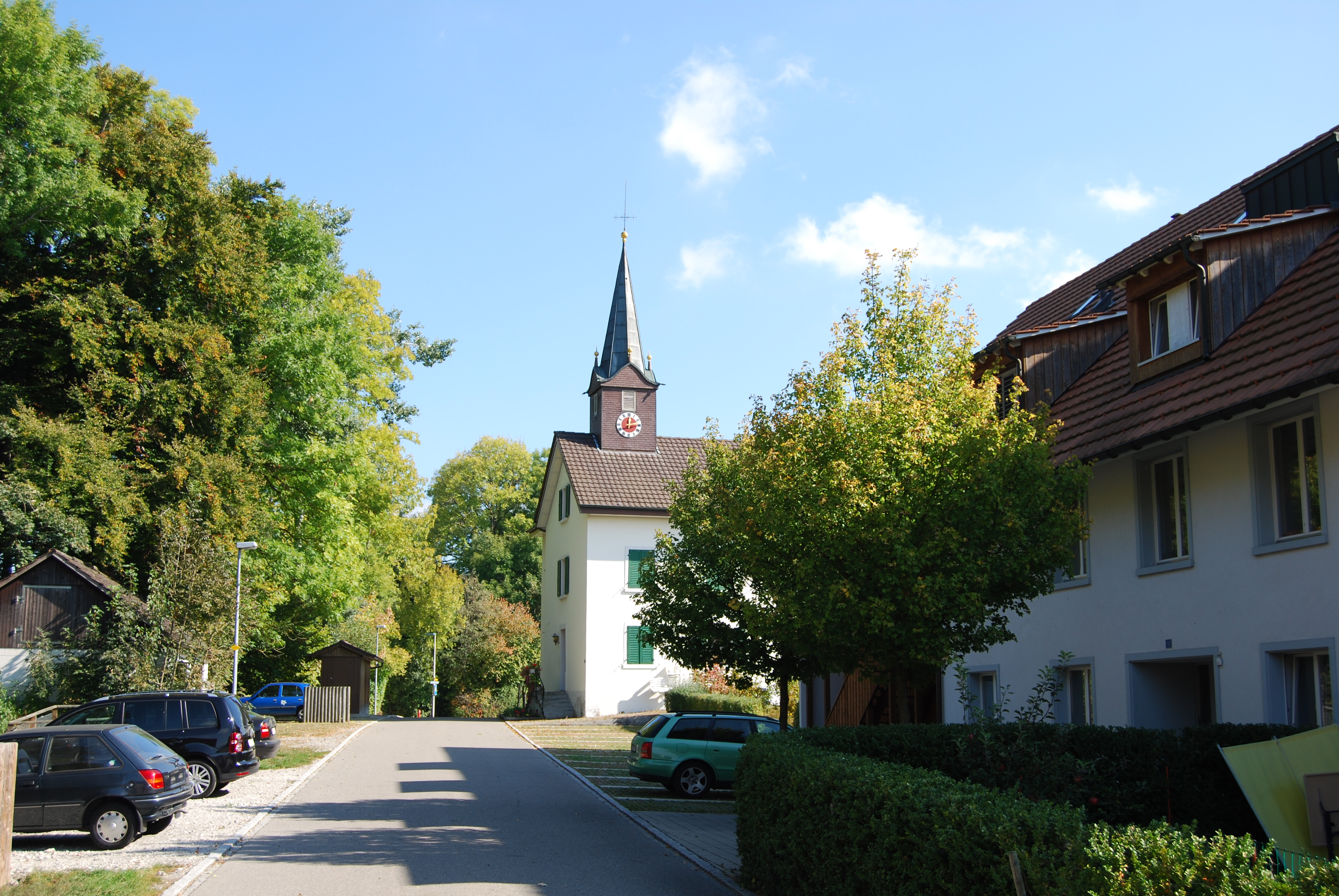

- Flag Coat of arms
- Location of Arni
- Location within Switzerland Location within Canton of Aargau
- Coordinates: 47°19.1667′N 8°25.3333′E
- Country: Switzerland
- Canton: Aargau
- District: Bremgarten

Area
  - Total: 3.37 km^{2} (1.30 sq mi)
- Elevation: 568 m (1,864 ft)

Population (December 2020)
  - Total: 1,888
  - Density: 560/km^{2} (1,450/sq mi)
- Time zone: UTC+01:00 (CET)
  - Summer (DST): UTC+02:00 (CEST)
- Postal code: 8905
- SFOS number: 4061
- ISO 3166 code: CH-AG
- Surrounded by: Aesch bei Birmensdorf (ZH), Hedingen (ZH), Islisberg, Jonen, Oberlunkhofen, Oberwil-Lieli, Unterlunkhofen
- Website: www.arni-ag.ch

Arni is a municipality in the district of Bremgarten in the Swiss canton of Aargau.

== History ==
Aerial view (1965)

Arni is first mentioned in 1184 as Arne. In 1983 the, already independent, village of Islisberg separated from the municipality of Arni-Islisberg to form the municipalities of Arni, AG and Islisberg.

== Geography ==
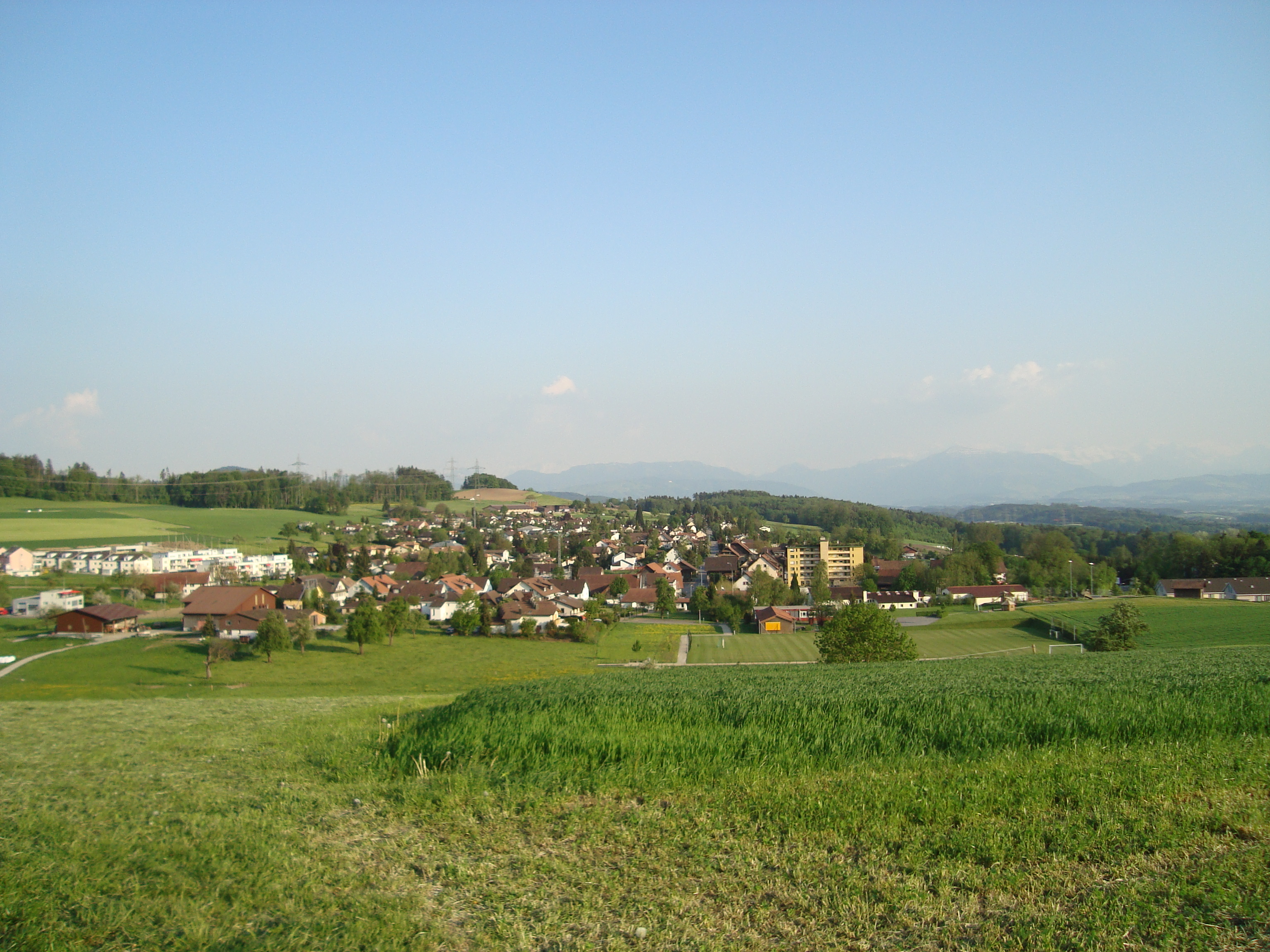
Arni from Wiibrguet

Arni has an area, as of 2006, of 3.4 square kilometers (1.3 sq mi). Of this area, 58.8% is used for agricultural purposes, while 28.4% is forested. Of the rest of the land, 12% is settled (buildings or roads) and the remainder (0.9%) is non-productive (rivers or lakes).

The municipality is located in the Bremgarten district on the southern edge of the Heitersberg at an elevation of 568 m (1,864 ft).

== Coat of arms ==
The blazon of the municipal coat of arms is Per fess Or a Lion passant Gules and Azure a Key fesswise with double Wards in sinister Argent.

== Demographics ==
Arni has a population (as of 31 December 2020) of 1,888. As of 2008, 12.1% of the population was made up of foreign nationals. Over the last 10 years the population has grown at a rate of 29.5%. Most of the population (as of 2000) speaks German (94.8%), with French being second most common ( 1.3%) and Italian being third ( 0.9%).

The age distribution, as of 2008, in Arni is; 187 children or 11.6% of the population are between 0 and 9 years old and 219 teenagers or 13.5% are between 10 and 19. Of the adult population, 149 people or 9.2% of the population are between 20 and 29 years old. 202 people or 12.5% are between 30 and 39, 327 people or 20.2% are between 40 and 49, and 277 people or 17.1% are between 50 and 59. The senior population distribution is 161 people or 9.9% of the population are between 60 and 69 years old, 67 people or 4.1% are between 70 and 79, there are 28 people or 1.7% who are between 80 and 89, and there are 2 people or 0.1% who are 90 and older.

As of 2000 the average number of residents per living room was 0.55 which is about equal to the cantonal average of 0.57 per room. In this case, a room is defined as space of a housing unit of at least 4 m^{2} (43 sq ft) as normal bedrooms, dining rooms, living rooms, kitchens and habitable cellars and attics. About 68.5% of the total households were owner occupied, or in other words did not pay rent (though they may have a mortgage or a rent-to-own agreement). As of 2000, there were 25 homes with 1 or 2 persons in the household, 183 homes with 3 or 4 persons in the household, and 278 homes with 5 or more persons in the household. The average number of people per household was 2.61 individuals. In 2008 there were 347 single family homes (or 56.5% of the total) out of a total of 614 homes and apartments. There were a total of 3 empty apartments for a 0.5% vacancy rate. As of 2007, the construction rate of new housing units was 0 new units per 1000 residents.

In the 2007 federal election the most popular party was the SVP which received 38.2% of the vote. The next three most popular parties were the CVP (15.9%), the SP (14.7%) and the FDP (14.4%).

The entire Swiss population is generally well educated. In Arni about 87.4% of the population (between age 25-64) have completed either non-mandatory upper secondary education or additional higher education (either university or a Fachhochschule). Of the school age population (in the 2008/2009 school year), there are 121 students attending primary school in the municipality.

The historical population is given in the following table:

Historical population
Year	Pop.	±%
1850	432	—
1900	434	+0.5%
1950	397	−8.5%
1975	711	+79.1%
1980	667	−6.2%
1990	966	+44.8%
2000	1,302	+34.8%

== Economy ==
As of 2007, Arni had an unemployment rate of 1.61%. As of 2005, there were 22 people employed in the primary economic sector and about 8 businesses involved in this sector. 85 people are employed in the secondary sector and there are 19 businesses in this sector. 87 people are employed in the tertiary sector, with 34 businesses in this sector.

As of 2000 there was a total of 740 workers who lived in the municipality. Of these, 613 or about 82.8% of the residents worked outside Arni while 71 people commuted into the municipality for work. There were a total of 198 jobs (of at least 6 hours per week) in the municipality. Of the working population, 22.8% used public transportation to get to work, and 53.3% used a private car.

== Religion ==
From the 2000 census, 542 or 41.6% were Roman Catholic, while 447 or 34.3% belonged to the Swiss Reformed Church. Of the rest of the population, there was 1 individual who belonged to the Christian Catholic faith.
