= Hedingen =

- Municipality
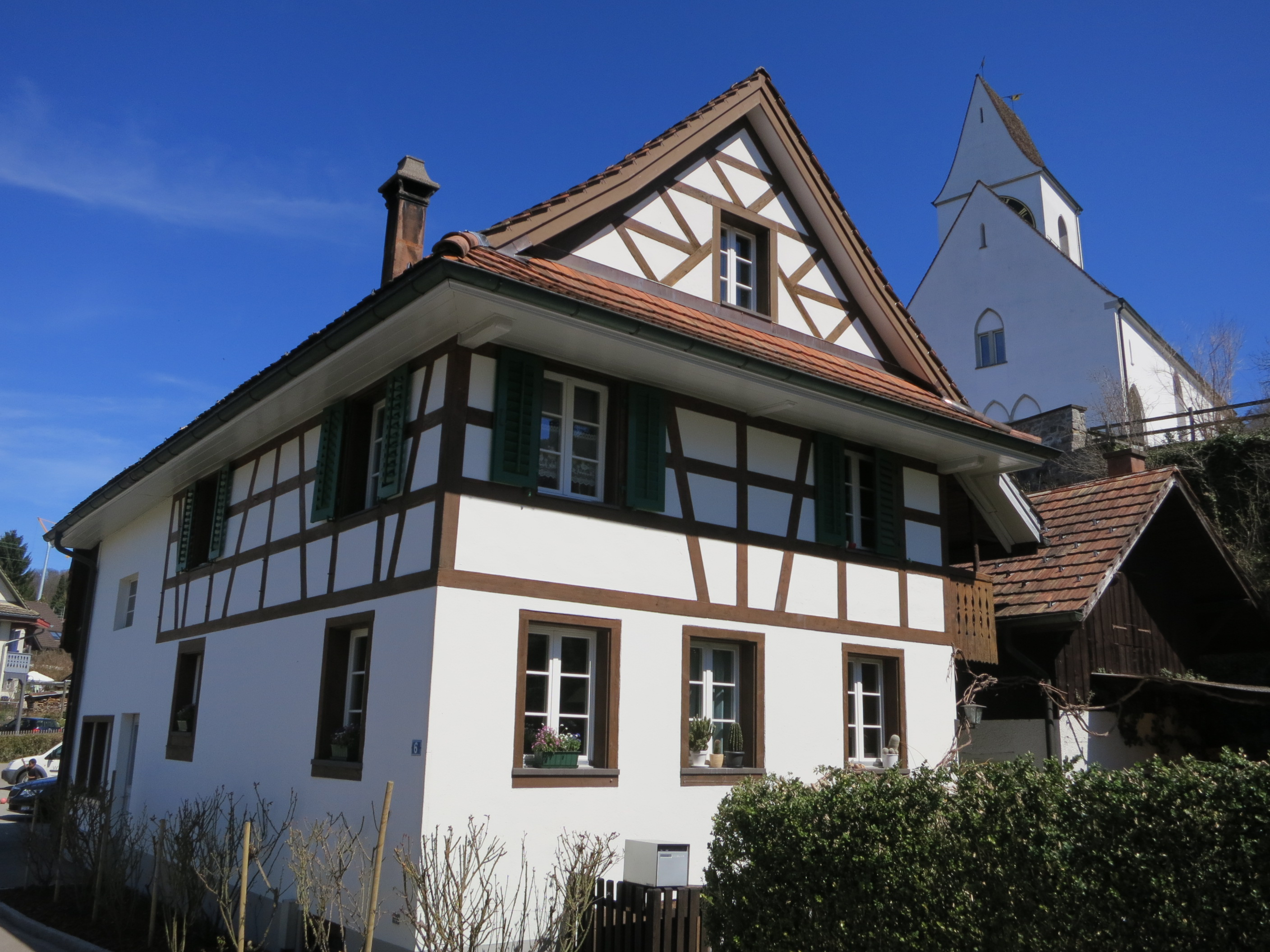

- Flag Coat of arms
- Location of Hedingen
- Location within Switzerland Location within Canton of Zurich
- Coordinates: 47°18′N 8°27′E
- Country: Switzerland
- Canton: Zurich
- District: Affoltern

Area
  - Total: 6.59 km^{2} (2.54 sq mi)
- Elevation: 501 m (1,644 ft)

Population (December 2020)
  - Total: 3,795
  - Density: 576/km^{2} (1,490/sq mi)
- Time zone: UTC+01:00 (CET)
  - Summer (DST): UTC+02:00 (CEST)
- Postal code: 8908
- SFOS number: 5
- ISO 3166 code: CH-ZH
- Surrounded by: Affoltern am Albis, Arni (AG), Bonstetten, Islisberg (AG), Jonen (AG), Stallikon
- Website: www.hedingen.ch

Hedingen is a municipality in the district of Affoltern in the canton of Zürich in Switzerland.

== History ==
Hedingen is first mentioned in 1116 as Hedingen.

== Geography ==
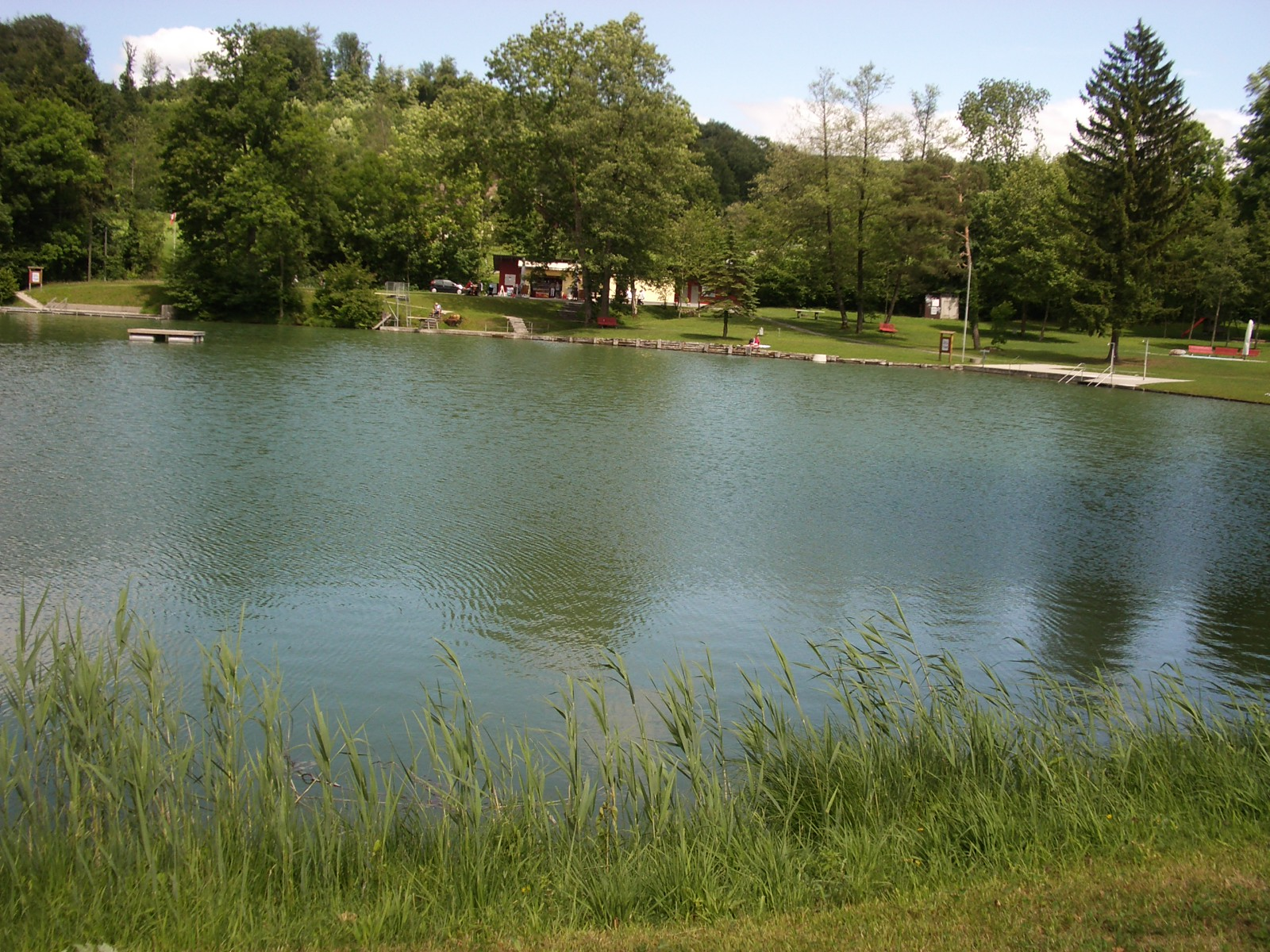
Pond near Hedingen

Aerial view from 500 m by Walter Mittelholzer (1923)

Hedingen has an area of 6.6 km^{2} (2.5 sq mi). Of this area, 48% is used for agricultural purposes, while 32.6% is forested. Of the rest of the land, 18.6% is settled (buildings or roads) and the remainder (0.8%) is non-productive (rivers, glaciers or mountains).

The municipality includes the village of Hedingen, the hamlets of Fromoos and Ismatt and scattered houses.

== Demographics ==
Hedingen has a population (as of 31 December 2020) of 3,795. As of 2007, 13.5% of the population was made up of foreign nationals. Over the last 10 years the population has grown at a rate of 18.2%. Most of the population (as of 2000) speaks German (88.7%), with Italian being second most common ( 3.0%) and Serbo-Croatian being third ( 2.0%).

In the 2007 election the most popular party was the SVP which received 34% of the vote. The next three most popular parties were the SPS (19.4%), the FDP (13.8%) and the CSP (11.8%).

The age distribution of the population (as of 2000) is children and teenagers (0–19 years old) make up 28.1% of the population, while adults (20–64 years old) make up 60.9% and seniors (over 64 years old) make up 11%. In Hedingen about 83% of the population (between age 25-64) have completed either non-mandatory upper secondary education or additional higher education (either university or a Fachhochschule).

Hedingen has an unemployment rate of 1.59%. As of 2005, there were 43 people employed in the primary economic sector and about 16 businesses involved in this sector. 712 people are employed in the secondary sector and there are 24 businesses in this sector. 547 people are employed in the tertiary sector, with 78 businesses in this sector. The historical population is given in the following table:

year	population
1467	24 households
1634	448
1689	689
1850	992
1888	807
1900	849
1950	1,138
1960	1,840
1990	2,190
2000	2,991
2004	3,107
2007	3,318
2011	3,464
2013	3,585

== Transport ==
Hedingen railway station is a stop of the Zürich S-Bahn on the lines S5 and S14. Its train station is a 27 minute ride from Zürich Hauptbahnhof.
