= Oberwil-Lieli =

- Municipality
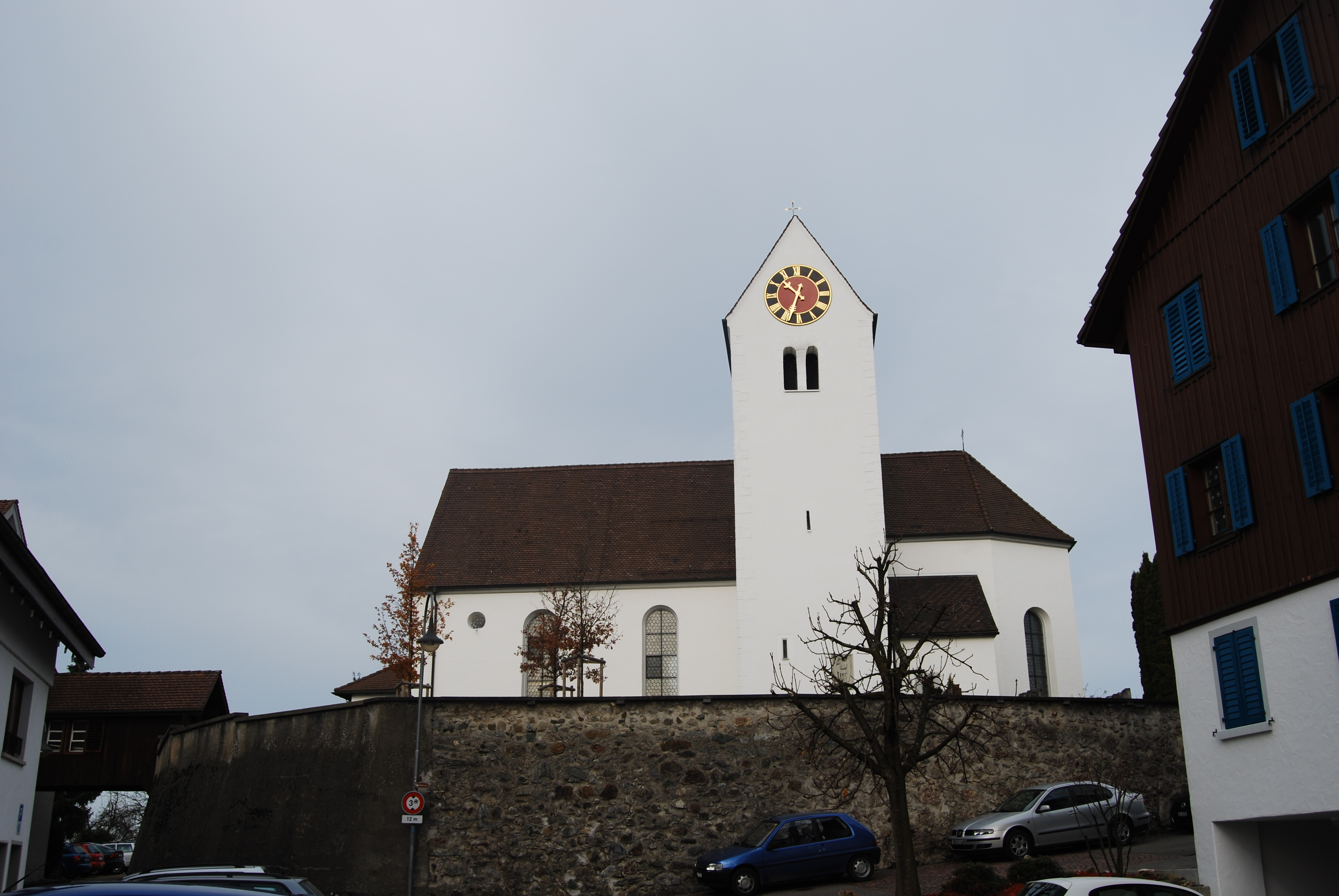

- Flag Coat of arms
- Location of Oberwil-Lieli
- Location within Switzerland Location within Canton of Aargau
- Coordinates: 47°20′N 8°24′E
- Country: Switzerland
- Canton: Aargau
- District: Bremgarten

Area
  - Total: 5.35 km^{2} (2.07 sq mi)
- Elevation: 530 m (1,740 ft)

Population (December 2020)
  - Total: 2,501
  - Density: 467/km^{2} (1,210/sq mi)
- Time zone: UTC+01:00 (CET)
  - Summer (DST): UTC+02:00 (CEST)
- Postal code: 8966
- SFOS number: 4074
- ISO 3166 code: CH-AG
- Surrounded by: Aesch bei Birmensdorf (ZH), Arni, Berikon, Birmensdorf (ZH), Unterlunkhofen, Zufikon
- Website: oberwil-lieli.ch

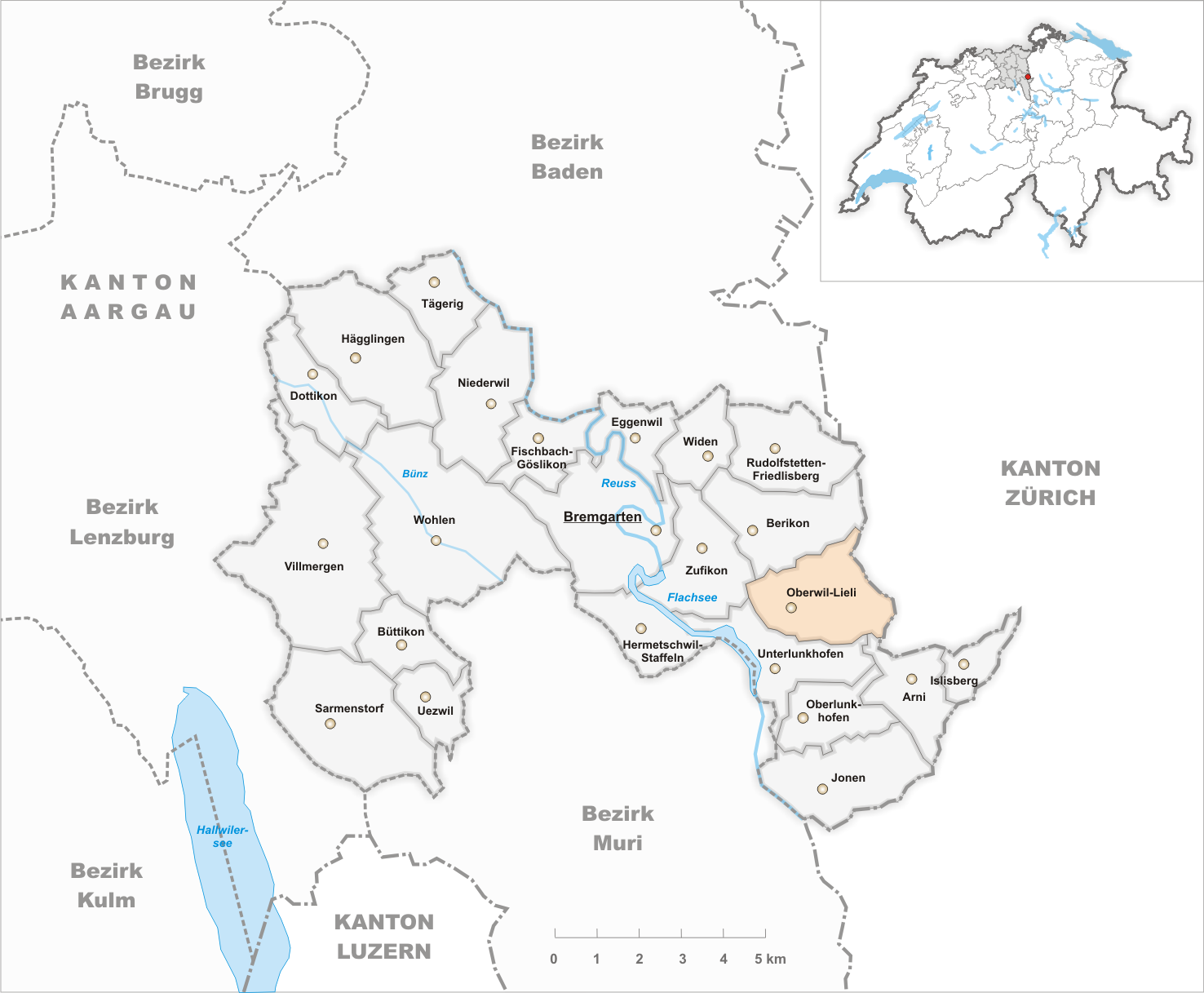
Oberwil-Lieli

Oberwil-Lieli is a municipality in the district of Bremgarten in the canton of Aargau in Switzerland.

== History ==
Aerial view (1964)

During the Roman era the municipal area was lightly settled. On the site of the current church there was a Roman farm. The ruins of an Alemanni settlement was also discovered in the municipality.

Oberwil-Lieli is first mentioned in 1040 as Willare in a land grant to Einsiedeln Abbey. During the 12th century, Engelberg and Muri Abbey were also given grants in the village. The rights to high and low justice were held by the Counts of Habsburg-Laufenburg. Their rights came in the 14th century to the lords of Schönenwerd and the knight Heinrich Biber, but in 1352 they went to the Family Stagel of Zurich. In 1429, the sovereign rights were granted to Bremgarten. After 1415 Oberwil was under the high justice of the city of Zurich.

The Kollatur (first mentioned in 1186) went out from under the authority of Engelberg Abbey in 1303 to the hospital at Konstanz and in 1527 was sold to Bremgarten. The parish church of St. Michael (church tower from the 11th century) was destroyed in 1445 and 1656. The present building dates from 1672 to 1673.

After the decline of the vineyards from 1860 onwards the population declined until 1960. Since then the number of new residential neighborhoods has increased steadily. The residential areas are oriented toward Zurich and since 2006 they follow the A4 motorway. The Oberwil municipality united in 1908 with Lieli to form Oberwil. Since 1984, it has been called Oberwil-Lieli.

== Geography ==
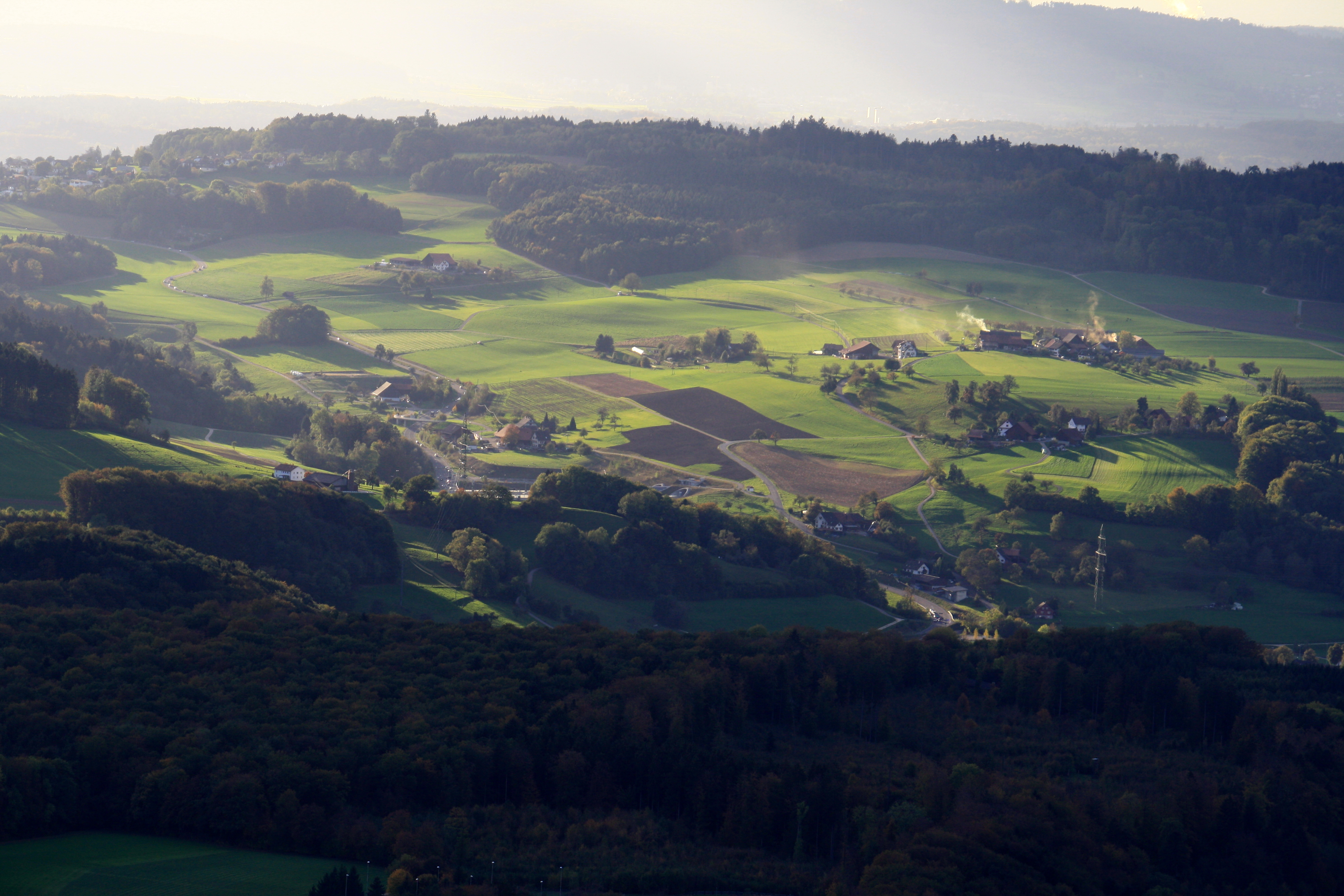
Road to Oberwil-Lieli as seen from Uetliberg (October 2009)

Oberwil-Lieli has an area of 5.4 square kilometers (2.1 sq mi). Of this area, 57.9% is used for agricultural purposes, while 26.9% is forested. Of the rest of the land, 14.9% is settled (buildings or roads) and the remainder (0.2%) is non-productive (rivers or lakes).

The municipality is located in the Bremgarten district on a terrasse in the Reuss river valley. It is on the edge of the former, historical Kelleramt district. It consists of the villages of Oberwil and Lieli.

== Coat of arms ==
The blazon of the municipal coat of arms is Argent a Pear Tree eradicated Vert fructed Or and Coupeaux of the second. The pear tree on the flag of Oberwil-Lieli is from the Holzbirrliberg, a mountain where the village is located.

== Demographics ==
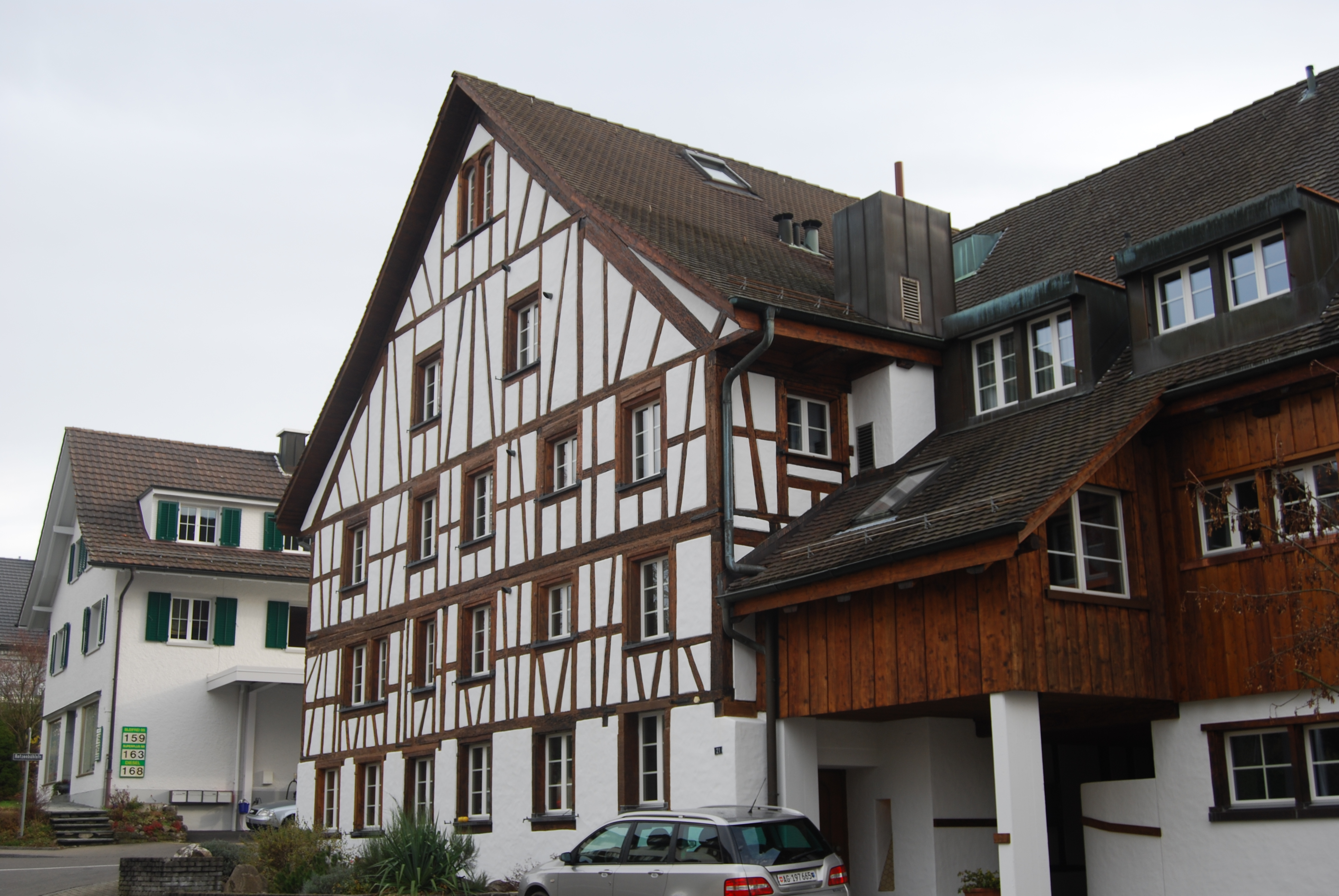
Half timbered house in Oberwil-Lieli

Oberwil-Lieli has a population (as of 31 December 2020) of 2,501. As of 2008, 8.2% of the population was made up of foreign nationals. Over the last 10 years the population has grown at a rate of 23.4%. Most of the population (as of 2000) speaks German (95.1%), with Italian being second most common ( 1.1%) and English being third ( 1.0%).

The age distribution, as of 2008, in Oberwil-Lieli is; 231 children or 11.1% of the population are between 0 and 9 years old and 213 teenagers or 10.2% are between 10 and 19. Of the adult population, 188 people or 9.0% of the population are between 20 and 29 years old. 273 people or 13.1% are between 30 and 39, 411 people or 19.7% are between 40 and 49, and 307 people or 14.7% are between 50 and 59. The senior population distribution is 271 people or 13.0% of the population are between 60 and 69 years old, 143 people or 6.9% are between 70 and 79, there are 41 people or 2.0% who are between 80 and 89, and there are 6 people or 0.3% who are 90 and older.

As of 2000 the average number of residents per living room was 0.52 which is about equal to the cantonal average of 0.57 per room. In this case, a room is defined as space of a housing unit of at least 4 m^{2} (43 sq ft) as normal bedrooms, dining rooms, living rooms, kitchens and habitable cellars and attics. About 67% of the total households were owner occupied, or in other words did not pay rent (though they may have a mortgage or a rent-to-own agreement). As of 2000, there were 60 homes with 1 or 2 persons in the household, 242 homes with 3 or 4 persons in the household, and 368 homes with 5 or more persons in the household. The average number of people per household was 2.45 individuals. In 2008 there were 407 single family homes (or 44% of the total) out of a total of 917 homes and apartments. There were a total of 8 empty apartments for a 0.9% vacancy rate. As of 2007, the construction rate of new housing units was 14.6 new units per 1000 residents.

In the 2007 federal election the most popular party was the SVP which received 38.9% of the vote. The next three most popular parties were the FDP (17.8%), the SP (15.6%) and the CVP (12.5%).

In Oberwil-Lieli about 86% of the population (between age 25 and 64) have completed either non-mandatory upper secondary education or additional higher education (either university or a Fachhochschule). Of the school age population (in the 2008/2009 school year), there are 175 students attending primary school, there are 16 students attending secondary school in the municipality.

The historical population is given in the following table:

Historical population
Year	Pop.	±%
1850	544	—
1900	468	−14.0%
1910	637	+36.1%
1950	605	−5.0%
2000	1,729	+185.8%

== Economy ==
As of 2007, Oberwil-Lieli had an unemployment rate of 1.4%. As of 2005, there were 88 people employed in the primary economic sector and about 23 businesses involved in this sector. 44 people are employed in the secondary sector and there are 16 businesses in this sector. 177 people are employed in the tertiary sector, with 71 businesses in this sector.

As of 2000 there was a total of 975 workers who lived in the municipality. Of these, 768 or about 78.8% of the residents worked outside Oberwil-Lieli while 84 people commuted into the municipality for work. There were a total of 291 jobs (of at least 6 hours per week) in the municipality. Of the working population, 18.1% used public transportation to get to work, and 53.2% used a private car.

== Religion ==
From the 2000 census, 725 or 41.9% were Roman Catholic, while 663 or 38.3% belonged to the Swiss Reformed Church. Of the rest of the population, there was 1 individual who belonged to the Christian Catholic faith.

== Education ==
Schulhaus Falter serves children living in Oberwil-Lieli.

Nearby secondary schools:

- Alte Kantonsschule Aarau
- Kantonsschule Baden
- Kantonsschule Wohlen
- Neue Kantonsschule Aarau

== Politics ==
In 2015, the mayor of Oberwil-Lieli at that time, Andreas Glarner, announced that the village would not agree to house its allocation of 10 asylum seekers and instead pay a CHF 290,000 annual compensation. He said that it was not clear if the asylum seekers would be refugees from Syria or economic migrants, as the majority of asylum seekers in Switzerland were from Eritrea. After intense debate, the village accepted to host a family of Syrian refugees and paid a donation of CHF 50,000 to a private organization helping refugees in Greece and Turkey.
