= Jonen =

- Municipality
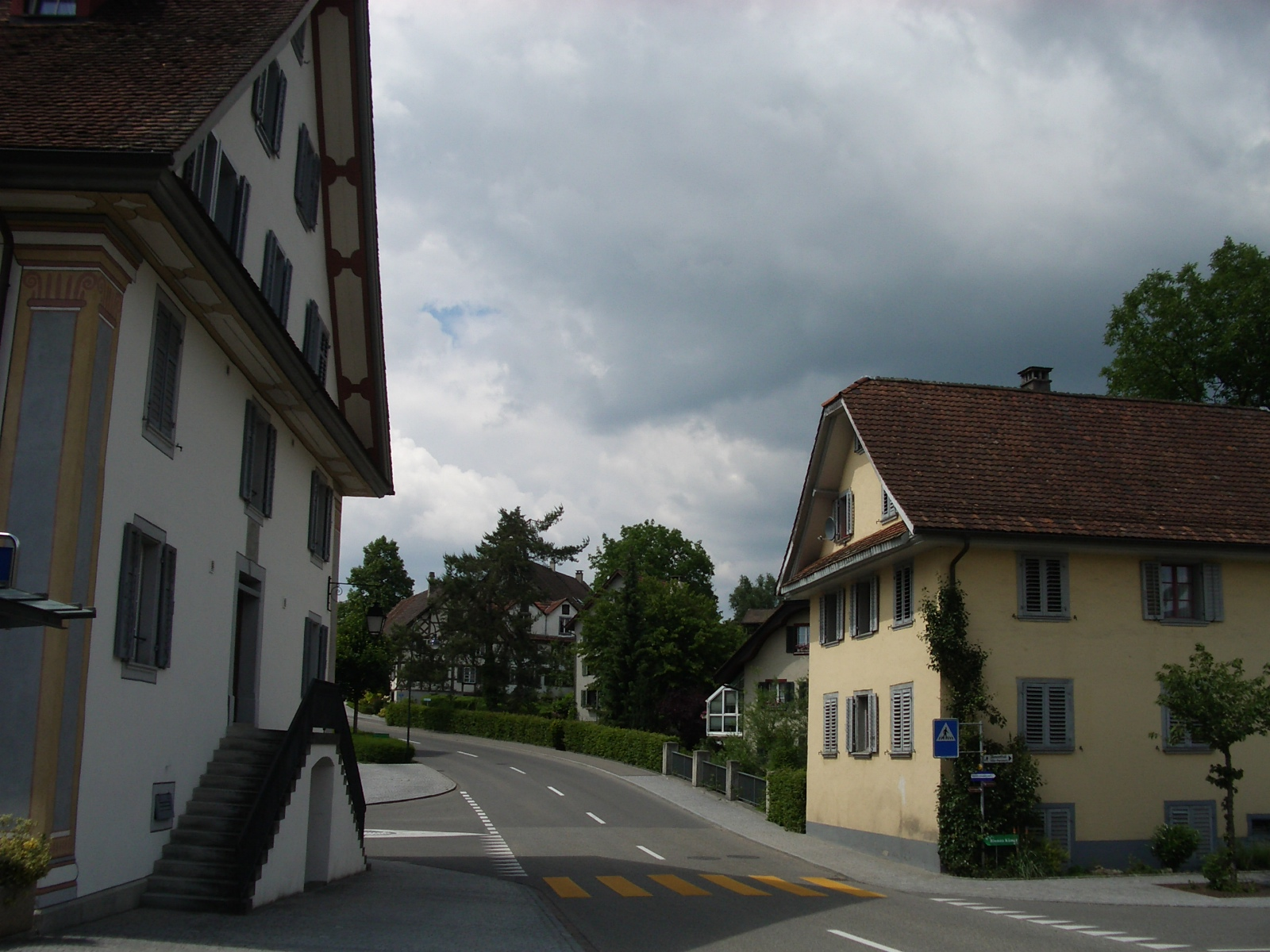

- Flag Coat of arms
- Location of Jonen
- Location within Switzerland Location within Canton of Aargau
- Coordinates: 47°18′N 8°24′E
- Country: Switzerland
- Canton: Aargau
- District: Bremgarten

Area
  - Total: 5.70 km^{2} (2.20 sq mi)
- Elevation: 401 m (1,316 ft)

Population (December 2020)
  - Total: 2,210
  - Density: 388/km^{2} (1,000/sq mi)
- Time zone: UTC+01:00 (CET)
  - Summer (DST): UTC+02:00 (CEST)
- Postal code: 8916
- SFOS number: 4071
- ISO 3166 code: CH-AG
- Surrounded by: (ZH), Hedingen (Aargau)
- Website: www.jonen.ch

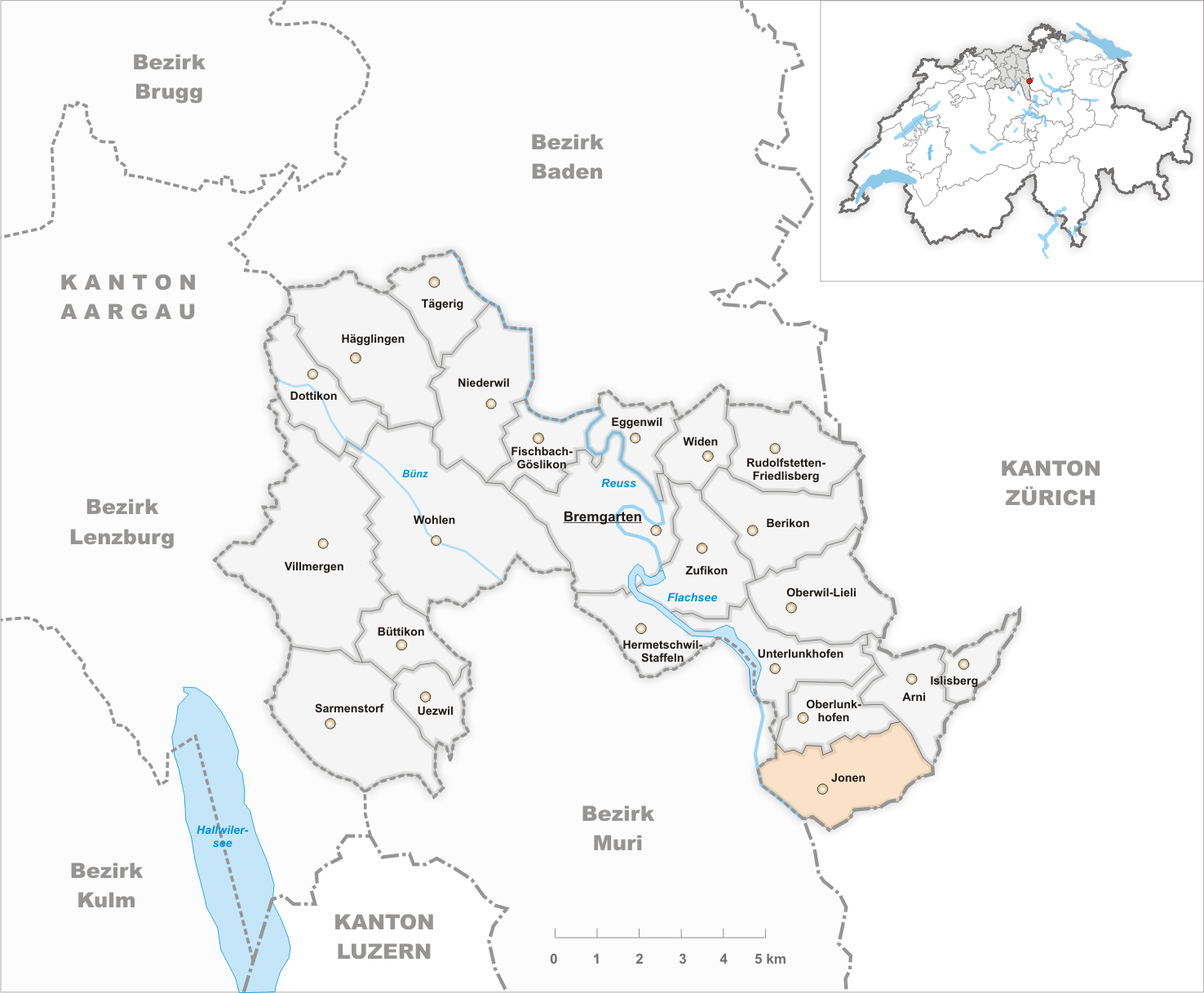
Jonen

Jonen is a municipality in the district of Bremgarten in the canton of Aargau in Switzerland.

== History ==
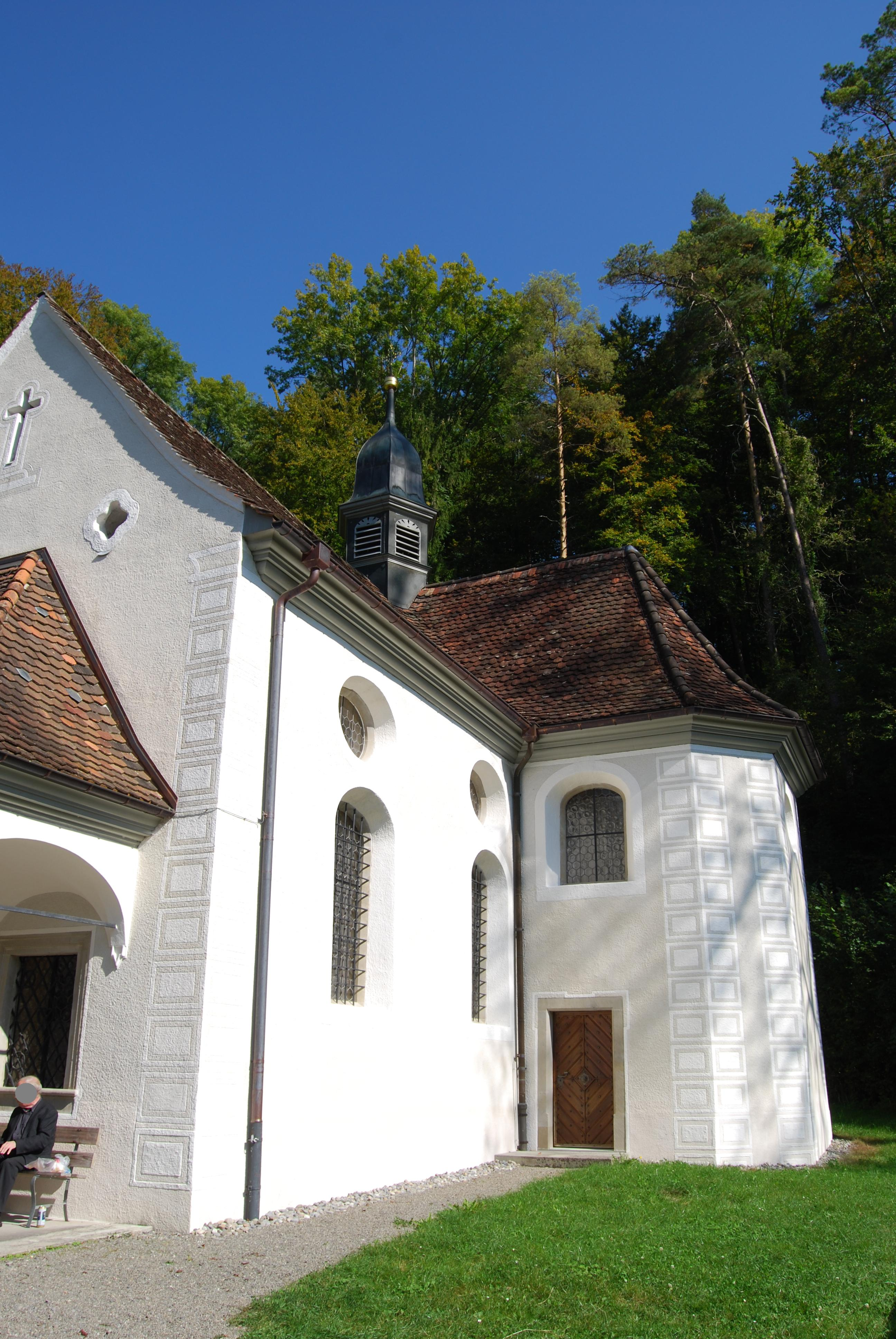
Jonenthal pilgrimage chapel

The first traces of a settlement come from an extensive burial ground from the Hallstatt period. There are remains of a Roman estate in Schalchmatthau. Additionally, the municipality contains an Alemanni cemetery (including six stone box graves) from the 6th to 7th century, in the territory of the former Käppelireben.

The first mention of the modern municipality was in 1243 when it was mentioned as Jonun. It was acquired in 1291 by Rudolf von Habsburg. In 1376 Duke Leopold of Austria pledged the rights to the low justice in the Kelleramt (of which Jonen was part) to Gottfried Milliner of Zurich.

Then, in 1415 the Kelleramt came under the sovereignty of Zurich. The church tithe was paid to Wettingen and Muri Abbey, St. Leodegar in Lucerne, and the church and the hospital of Bremgarten as well as the church of Zufikon. In the Middle Ages Jonan belonged to the Lunkhofen parish. But in 1866 it became an independent parish.

A Protestant chapel is first mentioned in 1598 in historic records. It was replaced in 1804 and destroyed by fire in 1811, as were two thirds of the village. It was rebuilt and in 1910 expanded to the tower and the choir. It serves as a parish church since 1866. The Reformed residents belong to Bremgarten-Mutschellen parish. The origins of the shrine in Jonental (1521 first mentioned) are unknown.

The first schoolhouse was built in 1808. Since 1972, Jonen has been the site for the District upper level school.

Since 1920, a bus that runs the route Bremgarten-Jonen-Affoltern am Albis. Until the 20th century, agriculture and dairy farming were the main industries in Jonen. However, by 2000 there were only 15 farms in the municipality. Since 1991 the head office of the homeopathic company Similasan AG have been located in Jonen. With the town's proximity to Bremgarten and Zurich, much of the population commutes to work at places away from Jonen.

== Geography ==
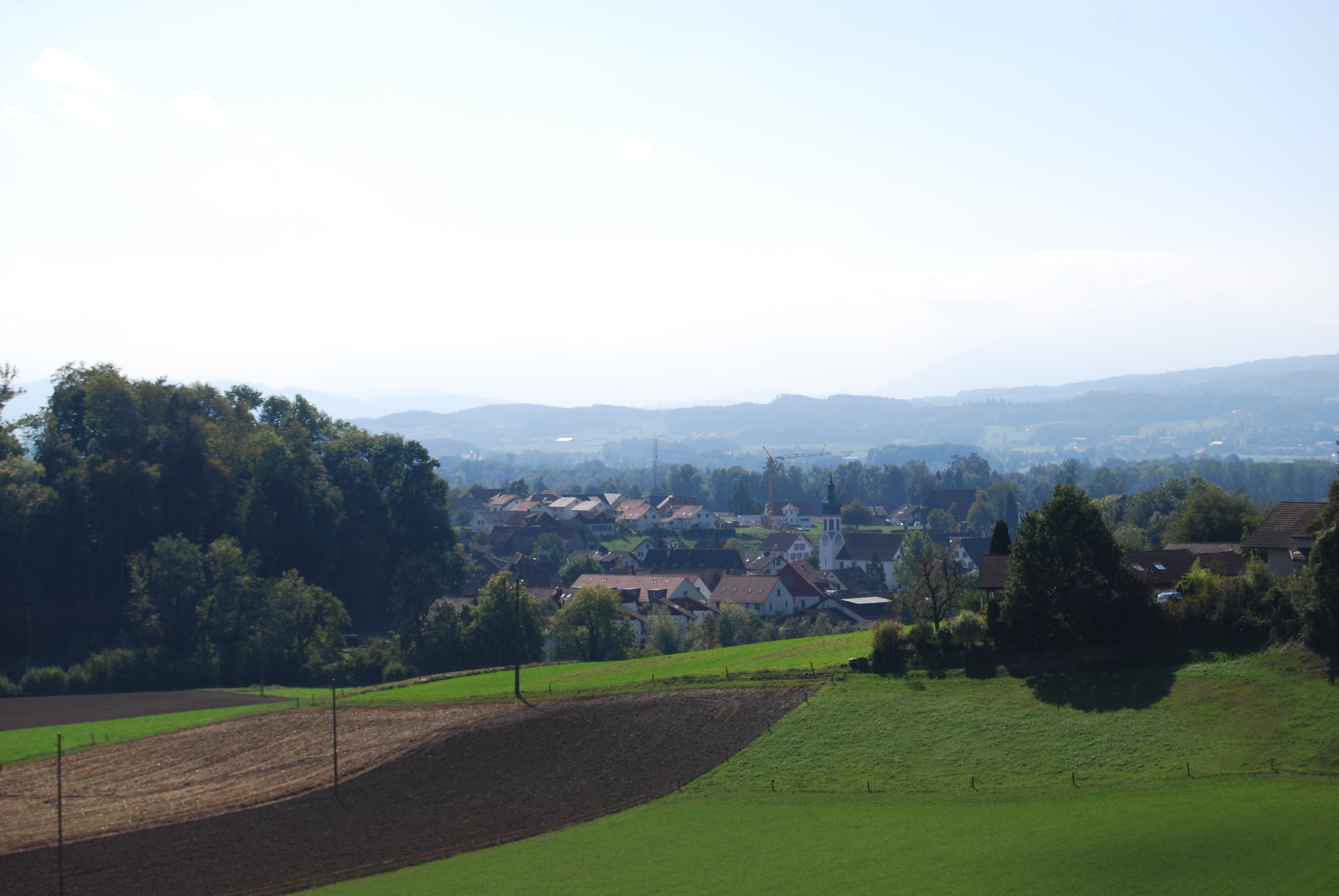
Jonen

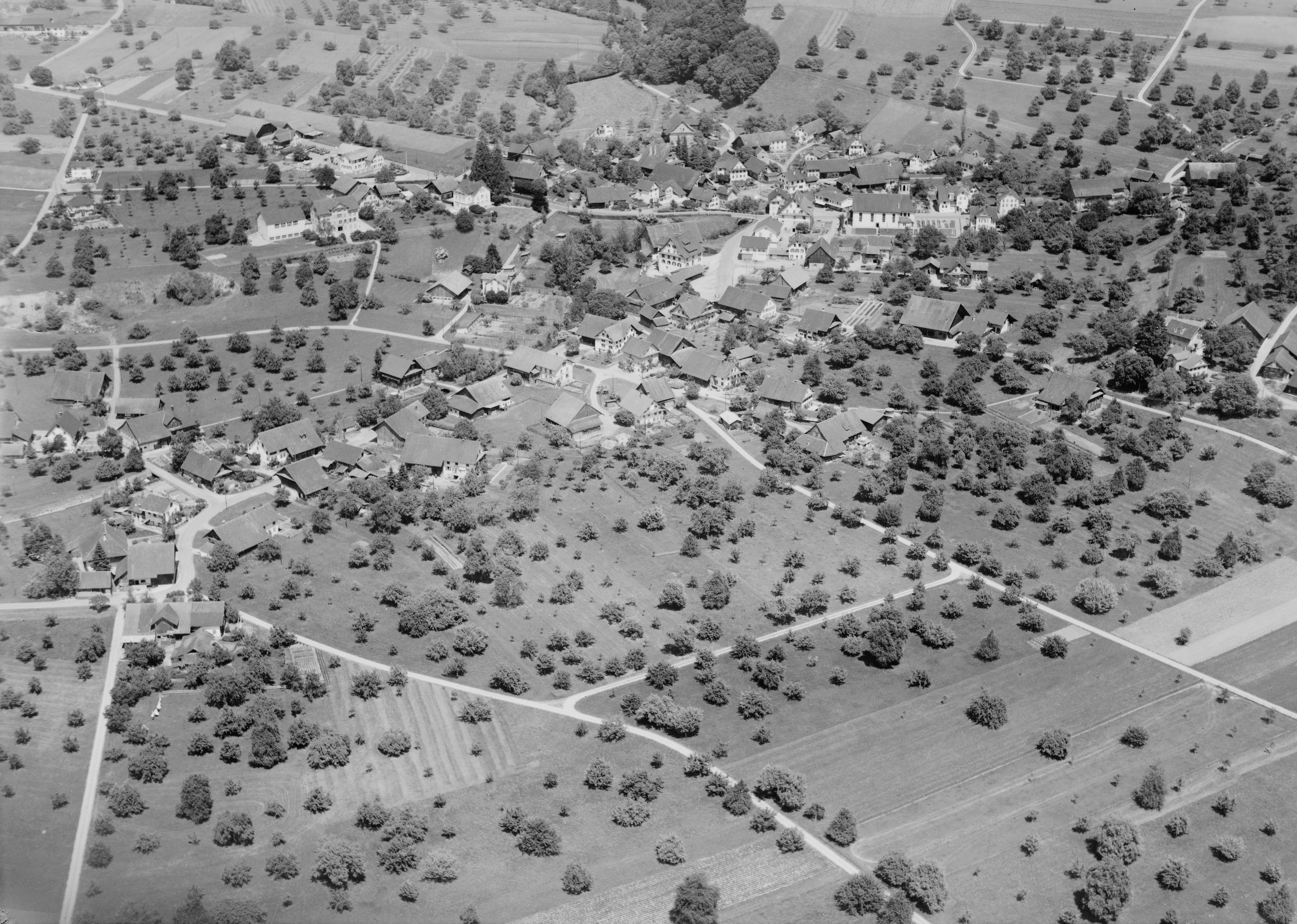
Aerial view (1962)

Jonen has an area, as of 2006, of 5.7 square kilometers (2.2 sq mi). Of this area, 57.7% is used for agricultural purposes, while 30.5% is forested. Of the rest of the land, 10% is settled (buildings or roads) and the remainder (1.8%) is non-productive (rivers or lakes).

The village center is on a flat level of the Reuss, approximately a half kilometer east of the river. The highest point is at 559 meters (1,834 ft) in the mountains in the east. Neighbour municipalities are Oberlunkhofen in the north, Arni in the northeast, Affoltern am Albis in the southeast, Ottenbach in the south, Aristau in the west and Rottenschwil in the northwest.

The municipality is located in the Bremgarten district. It consists of the village of Jonen and the hamlets of Obschlagen and Litzi.

== Coat of arms ==
The blazon of the municipal coat of arms is Tierced per pale wavy Azure three Mullets Argent in pale, Argent and Gules a Key Argent.

== Demographics ==
Jonen has a population (as of 31 December 2020) of 2,210. As of 2008, 11.0% of the population was made up of foreign nationals. Over the last 10 years the population has grown at a rate of 22%. Most of the population (as of 2000) speaks German (94.9%), with Serbo-Croatian being second most common ( 0.9%) and Italian being third ( 0.8%).

The age distribution, as of 2008, in Jonen is; 227 children or 12.5% of the population are between 0 and 9 years old and 284 teenagers or 15.6% are between 10 and 19. Of the adult population, 137 people or 7.5% of the population are between 20 and 29 years old. 241 people or 13.3% are between 30 and 39, 403 people or 22.2% are between 40 and 49, and 252 people or 13.9% are between 50 and 59. The senior population distribution is 151 people or 8.3% of the population are between 60 and 69 years old, 83 people or 4.6% are between 70 and 79, there are 36 people or 2.0% who are between 80 and 89, and there are 3 people or 0.2% who are 90 and older.

As of 2000 the average number of residents per living room was 0.56 which is about equal to the cantonal average of 0.57 per room. In this case, a room is defined as space of a housing unit of at least 4 m^{2} (43 sq ft) as normal bedrooms, dining rooms, living rooms, kitchens and habitable cellars and attics. About 60.2% of the total households were owner occupied, or in other words did not pay rent (though they may have a mortgage or a rent-to-own agreement). As of 2000, there were 42 homes with 1 or 2 persons in the household, 206 homes with 3 or 4 persons in the household, and 328 homes with 5 or more persons in the household. The average number of people per household was 2.60 individuals. In 2008 there were 361 single family homes (or 51.7% of the total) out of a total of 698 homes and apartments. There were a total of 8 empty apartments for a 1.1% vacancy rate. As of 2007, the construction rate of new housing units was 8.6 new units per 1000 residents.

In the 2007 federal election the most popular party was the SVP which received 34.3% of the vote. The next three most popular parties were the CVP (24.6%), the SP (14.4%) and the FDP (11%).

The entire Swiss population is generally well educated. In Jonen about 83.5% of the population (between age 25-64) have completed either non-mandatory upper secondary education or additional higher education (either university or a Fachhochschule). Of the school age population (in the 2008/2009 school year), there are 188 students attending primary school, there are 223 students attending secondary school in the municipality.

The historical population is given in the following table:

Historical population
Year	Pop.	±%
1850	788	—
1900	630	−20.1%
1950	570	−9.5%
1980	800	+40.4%
2000	1,569	+96.1%

== Heritage sites of national significance ==
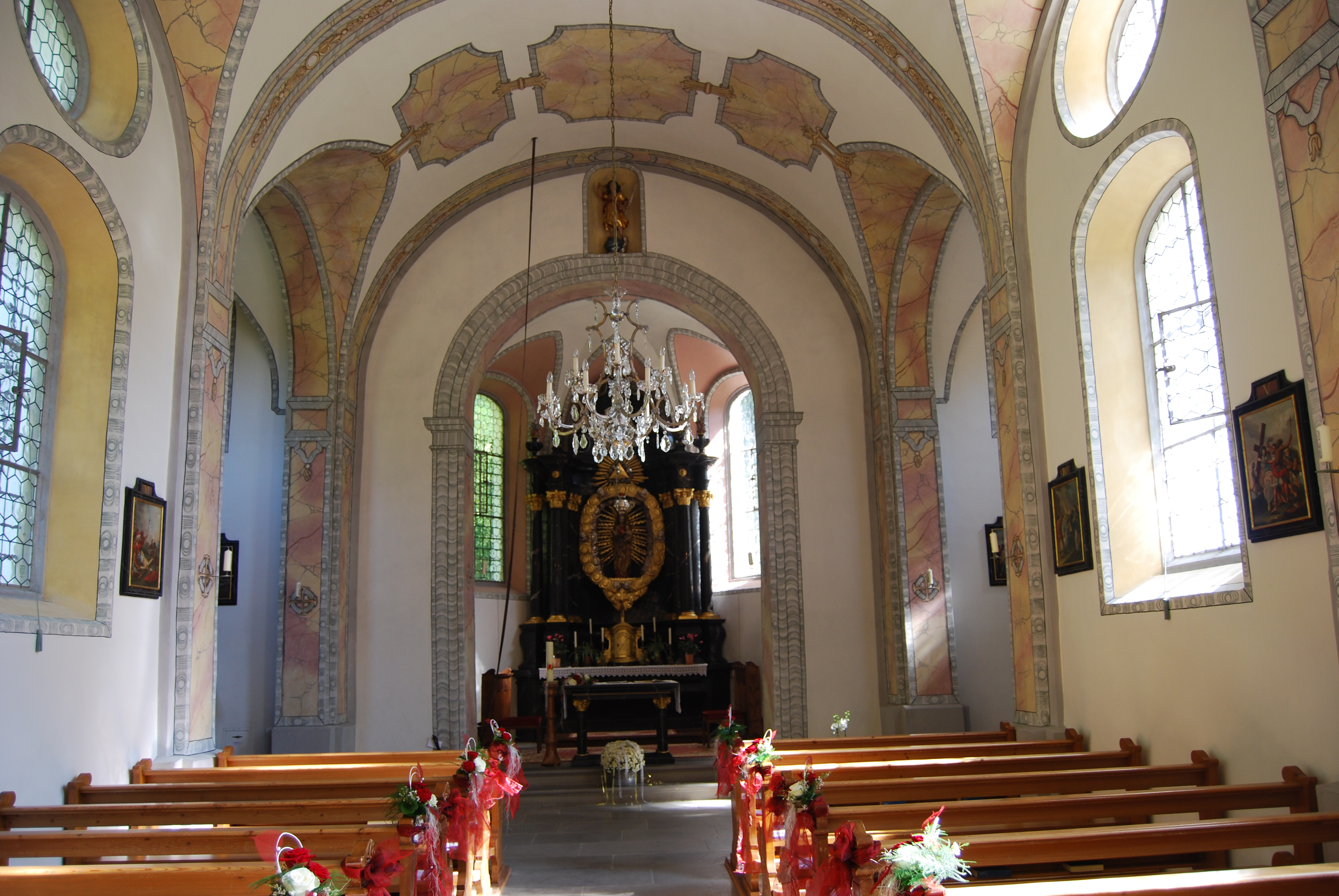
Interior of the pilgrimage chapel in Jonenthal

The pilgrimage chapel in Jonental is listed as a Swiss heritage site of national significance.

The village of Jonen and the hamlets of Obschlagen and Litzi are designated as part of the Inventory of Swiss Heritage Sites.

== Economy ==
As of 2007, Jonen had an unemployment rate of 1.47%. As of 2005, there were 72 people employed in the primary economic sector and about 24 businesses involved in this sector. 190 people are employed in the secondary sector and there are 22 businesses in this sector. 200 people are employed in the tertiary sector, with 41 businesses in this sector.

As of 2000 there were 853 total workers who lived in the municipality. Of these, 669 or about 78.4% of the residents worked outside Jonen while 164 people commuted into the municipality for work. There were a total of 348 jobs (of at least 6 hours per week) in the municipality. Of the working population, 17.4% used public transportation to get to work, and 56.2% used a private car.

== Religion ==
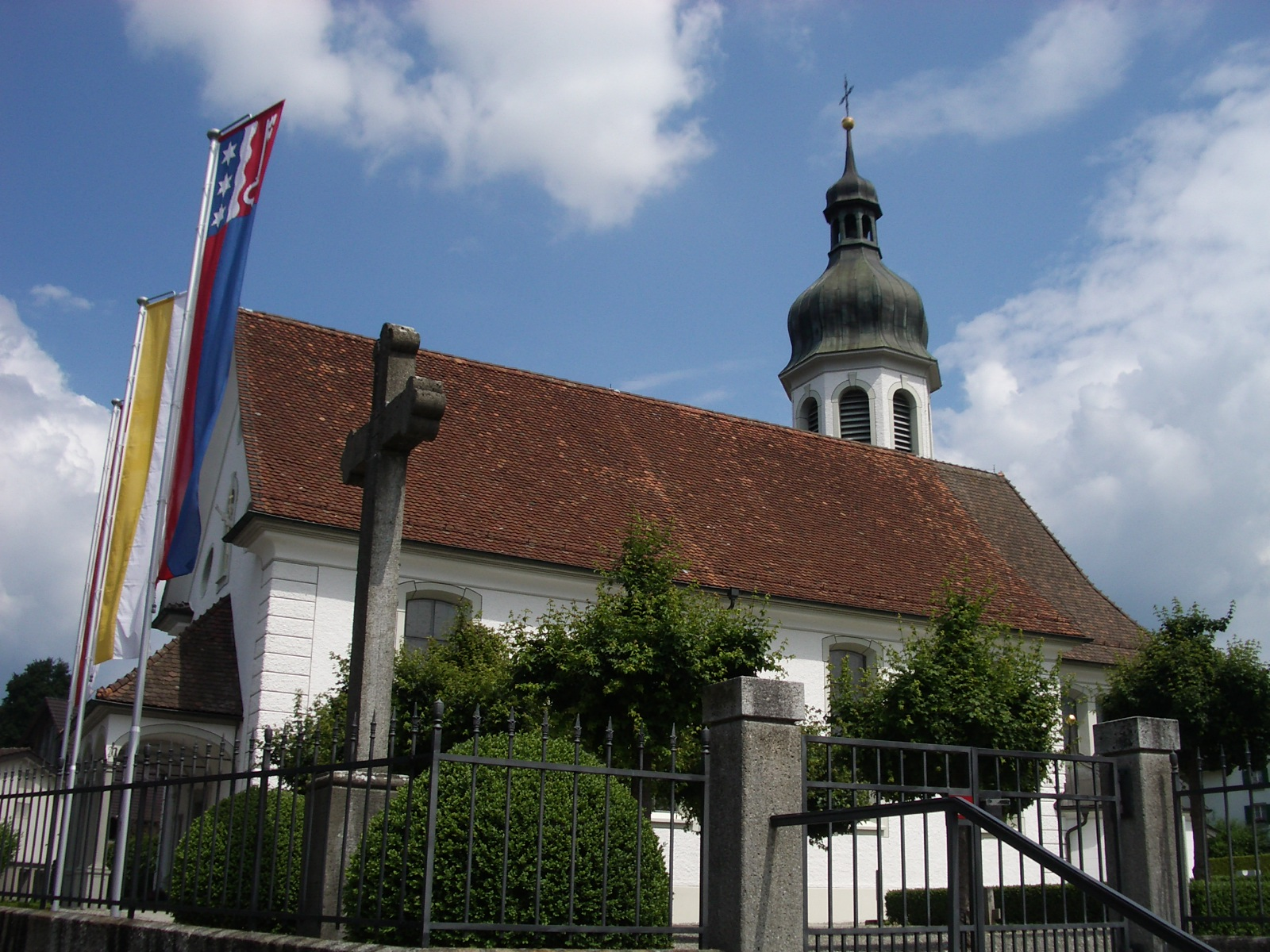
Church of Jonen

From the 2000 census, 885 or 56.4% were Roman Catholic, while 446 or 28.4% belonged to the Swiss Reformed Church. Of the rest of the population, there was 1 individual who belonged to the Christian Catholic faith.
