= Bremgarten District =

Coordinates: 47°21′N 8°20′E

Bremgarten District Bezirk Bremgarten
- District
- Country: Switzerland
- Canton: Aargau
- Capital: Bremgarten

Area
  - Total: 117.46 km^{2} (45.35 sq mi)

Population (2020)
  - Total: 79,366
  - Density: 675.69/km^{2} (1,750.0/sq mi)
- Time zone: UTC+1 (CET)
  - Summer (DST): UTC+2 (CEST)
- Municipalities: 22

Bremgarten District is a Swiss district in the Canton of Aargau, corresponding to the valleys of the Reuss and Bünz rivers in the area known as the Freiamt.

== Geography ==
Bremgarten District has an area, as of 1997, of 117.47 km^{2} (45.36 sq mi). Of this area, 48.7% is used for agricultural purposes, while 30.9% is forested. The rest of the land, (18.1%) is settled.

== Demographics ==
Bremgarten District has a population of 79,366 (as of 31 December 2020).

As of 2000, there were 2,402 homes with 1 or 2 persons in the household, 11,781 homes with 3 or 4 persons in the household, and 9,773 homes with 5 or more persons in the household. The average number of people per household was 2.43 individuals. In 2008 there were 10,969 single family homes (or 37.2% of the total) out of a total of 29,488 homes and apartments. There were a total of 479 empty apartments for a 1.6% vacancy rate.

Of the school age population (in the 2008/2009 school year), there are 5,276 students attending primary school, there are 1,992 students attending secondary school, there are 1,349 students attending tertiary or university level schooling, and there are 30 students who are seeking a job after school in the municipality.

== Economy ==
As of 2000 there were 33,414 residents who worked in the district, while 25,027 residents worked outside the Bremgarten district and 11,621 people commuted into the district for work.

== Religion ==
From the 2000 census, 32,805 or 53.2% were Roman Catholic, while 16,065 or 26.1% belonged to the Swiss Reformed Church. Of the rest of the population, there were 70 individuals (or about 0.11% of the population) who belonged to the Christian Catholic faith.

== Municipalities ==
Population

Crest	Name of municipality	Population (31 December 2020)	Area in km^{2}
Arni	Arni	1,888	3.37
Berikon	Berikon	4,749	5.38
Bremgarten	Bremgarten	8,415	11.36
Büttikon	Büttikon	1,061	2.82
Dottikon	Dottikon	3,932	3.89
Eggenwil	Eggenwil	1,042	2.46
Fischbach-Göslikon	Fischbach-Göslikon	1,672	3.07
Hägglingen	Hägglingen	2,437	7.73
Islisberg	Islisberg	643	1.65
Jonen	Jonen	2,210	5.70
Niederwil	Niederwil	2,863	6.15
Oberlunkhofen	Oberlunkhofen	2,079	3.25
Oberwil-Lieli	Oberwil-Lieli	2,501	5.35
Rudolfstetten-Friedlisberg	Rudolfstetten-Friedlisberg	4,546	4.90
Sarmenstorf	Sarmenstorf	2,913	8.30
Tägerig	Tägerig	1,470	3.30
Uezwil	Uezwil	504	2.45
Unterlunkhofen	Unterlunkhofen	1,499	4.49
Villmergen	Villmergen	7,668	11.94
Widen	Widen	3,845	2.62
Wohlen	Wohlen	16,881	12.48
Zufikon	Zufikon	4,548	4.80
	Total	79,366	117.46

=== Mergers ===
The following changes to the district's municipalities have occurred since 2000:

- Hilfikon became part of Villmergen in 2010 (the area figure above includes Hilfikon).
- On 1 January 2014 the former municipality of Hermetschwil-Staffeln merged into the municipality of Bremgarten (AG).
