= Islisberg =

- Municipality
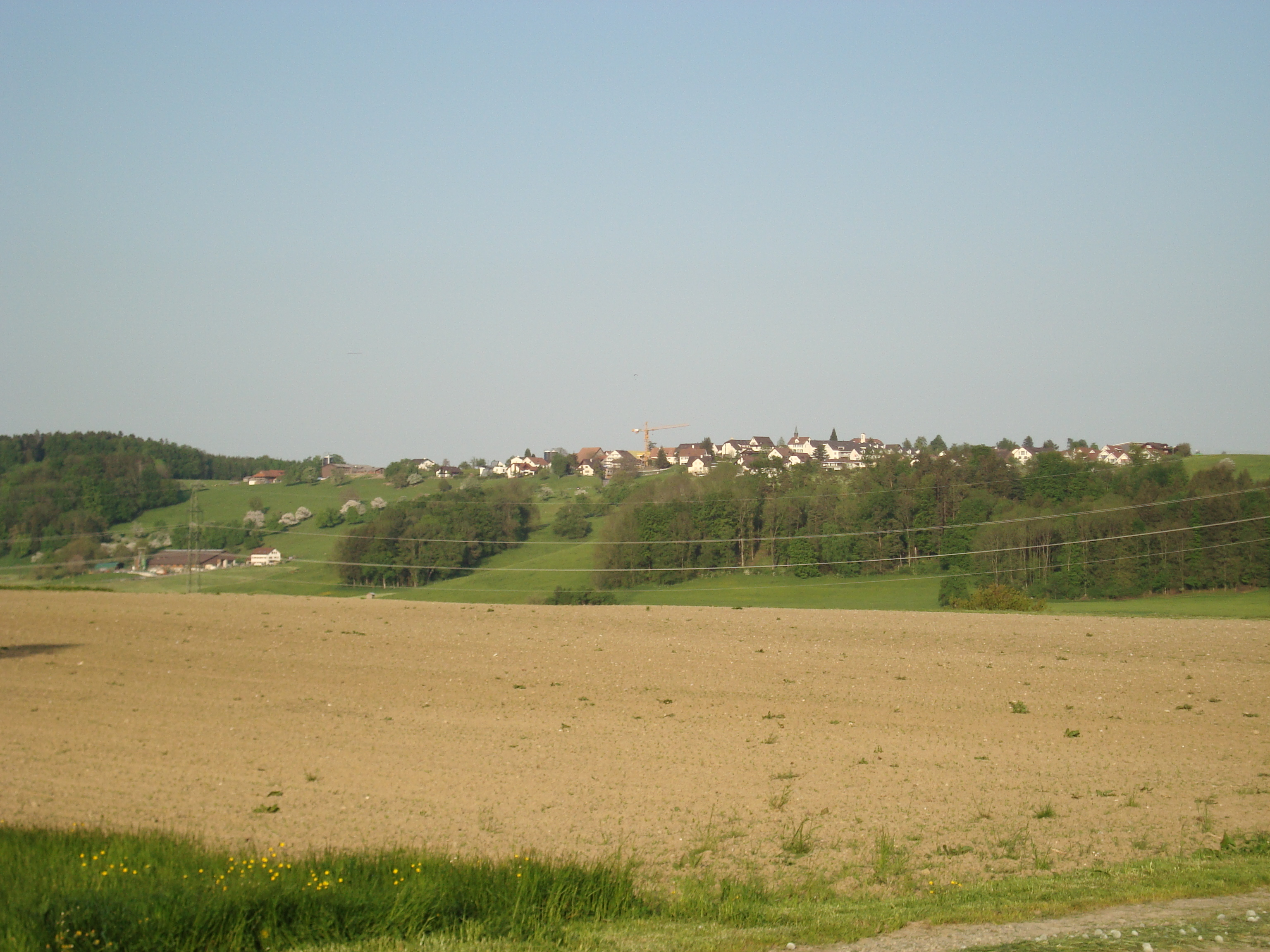

- Flag Coat of arms
- Location of Islisberg
- Location within Switzerland Location within Canton of Aargau
- Coordinates: 47°19′N 8°26′E
- Country: Switzerland
- Canton: Aargau
- District: Bremgarten

Area
  - Total: 1.65 km^{2} (0.64 sq mi)
- Elevation: 680 m (2,230 ft)

Population (December 2020)
  - Total: 643
  - Density: 390/km^{2} (1,010/sq mi)
- Time zone: UTC+01:00 (CET)
  - Summer (DST): UTC+02:00 (CEST)
- Postal code: 8905
- SFOS number: 4084
- ISO 3166 code: CH-AG
- Surrounded by: Aesch bei Birmensdorf (ZH), Arni, Bonstetten (ZH), Hedingen (ZH)
- Website: www.islisberg.ch

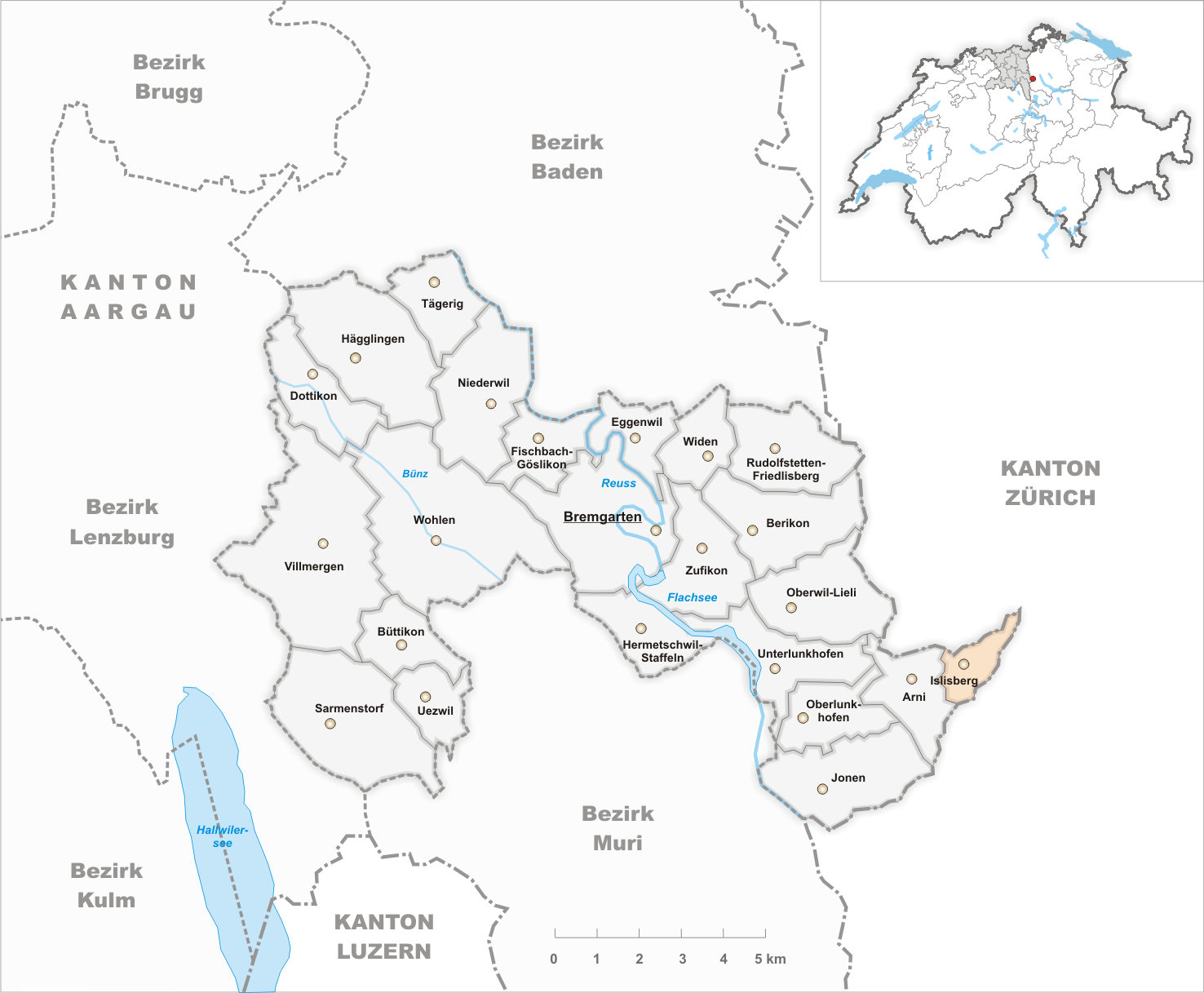
Islisberg

Islisberg is a municipality in the district of Bremgarten in the canton of Aargau in Switzerland.

== History ==
Islisberg is first mentioned in 1185 as Nidolperhc. In 1305 it was mentioned as Isbolzberg. In the 13th century it was a Habsburg bailiwick. The main landholders in the village were Muri Abbey, Frauenthal Abbey and the Monastery of St. Leodegar in Lucerne. In 1414 Bremgarten gained the right to low justice in the village, a right that it held until 1797. After 1415, Zurich exerted the rights to high justice over the Kelleramt, including Islisberg.

Between 1360 and 1370 a chapel is mentioned in the village. This chapel was dedicated in 1937 to St. Anthony of Padua. The Catholic residents belong to the parish of Lunkhofen while the Reformed residents belong to the Bremgarten-Mutschellen parish.

Starting in 1811 there was a winter school in the dairy, and in 1869 the schoolhouse opened. A new school building opened in 2000. While the village was originally a farming village, at the beginning of the 21st century there were only four farms left. It is increasingly developing into a residential extension of the agglomeration of Zurich.

From 1803 until 1982 it was part of the municipality of Arni-Islisberg. In 1983 it split into two separate municipalities.

== Geography ==
Aerial view (1950)

Islisberg has an area, as of 2006, of 1.7 square kilometers (0.66 sq mi). Of this area, 69% is used for agricultural purposes, while 22% is forested. The rest of the land, (8.9%) is settled.

The municipality is located in the Bremgarten district at the eastern edge of the canton.

== Coat of arms ==
The blazon of the municipal coat of arms is Per bend Or a Lion passant bendwise Gules and Azure a Key bendwise Argent.

== Demographics ==
Islisberg has a population (as of 31 December 2020) of 643. As of 2008, 10.9% of the population was made up of foreign nationals. Over the last 10 years the population has grown at a rate of 61.9%. Most of the population (as of 2000) speaks German (94.1%), with English being second most common ( 2.7%) and Dutch being third ( 0.7%).

The age distribution, as of 2008, in Islisberg is; 65 children or 12.8% of the population are between 0 and 9 years old and 58 teenagers or 11.4% are between 10 and 19. Of the adult population, 54 people or 10.6% of the population are between 20 and 29 years old. 79 people or 15.5% are between 30 and 39, 108 people or 21.2% are between 40 and 49, and 67 people or 13.2% are between 50 and 59. The senior population distribution is 42 people or 8.3% of the population are between 60 and 69 years old, 23 people or 4.5% are between 70 and 79, there are 12 people or 2.4% who are between 80 and 89, and there is 1 person who is 90 or older.

As of 2000 the average number of residents per living room was 0.55 which is about equal to the cantonal average of 0.57 per room. In this case, a room is defined as space of a housing unit of at least 4 m^{2} (43 sq ft) as normal bedrooms, dining rooms, living rooms, kitchens and habitable cellars and attics. About 57.1% of the total households were owner occupied, or in other words did not pay rent (though they may have a mortgage or a rent-to-own agreement). As of 2000, there were 4 homes with 1 or 2 persons in the household, 80 homes with 3 or 4 persons in the household, and 70 homes with 5 or more persons in the household. The average number of people per household was 2.53 individuals. In 2008 there were 87 single family homes (or 39.0% of the total) out of a total of 223 homes and apartments. There were a total of 4 empty apartments for a 1.8% vacancy rate. As of 2007, the construction rate of new housing units was 16.4 new units per 1000 residents.

In the 2007 federal election the most popular party was the SVP which received 37.4% of the vote. The next three most popular parties were the CVP (27.5%), the FDP (12.5%) and the SP (10.2%).

The entire Swiss population is generally well educated. In Islisberg about 85.3% of the population (between age 25 and 64) have completed either non-mandatory upper secondary education or additional higher education (either university or a Fachhochschule). Of the school age population (in the 2008/2009 school year), there are 60 students attending primary school in the municipality.

The historical population is given in the following table:

Historical population
Year	Pop.	±%
1980	157	—
1990	259	+65.0%
2000	405	+56.4%

== Economy ==
As of 2007, Islisberg had an unemployment rate of 1.87%. As of 2005, there were 21 people employed in the primary economic sector and about 8 businesses involved in this sector. 5 people are employed in the secondary sector and there are 3 businesses in this sector. 30 people are employed in the tertiary sector, with 7 businesses in this sector.

As of 2000 there was a total of 223 workers who lived in the municipality. Of these, 183 or about 82.1% of the residents worked outside Islisberg while 13 people commuted into the municipality for work. There were a total of 53 jobs (of at least 6 hours per week) in the municipality. Of the working population, 12.3% used public transportation to get to work, and 58.1% used a private car.

== Religion ==
From the 2000 census, 222 or 54.8% were Roman Catholic, while 105 or 25.9% belonged to the Swiss Reformed Church.
