= Kulturzentrum Bremgarten =

Self-managed social centre in Bremgarten

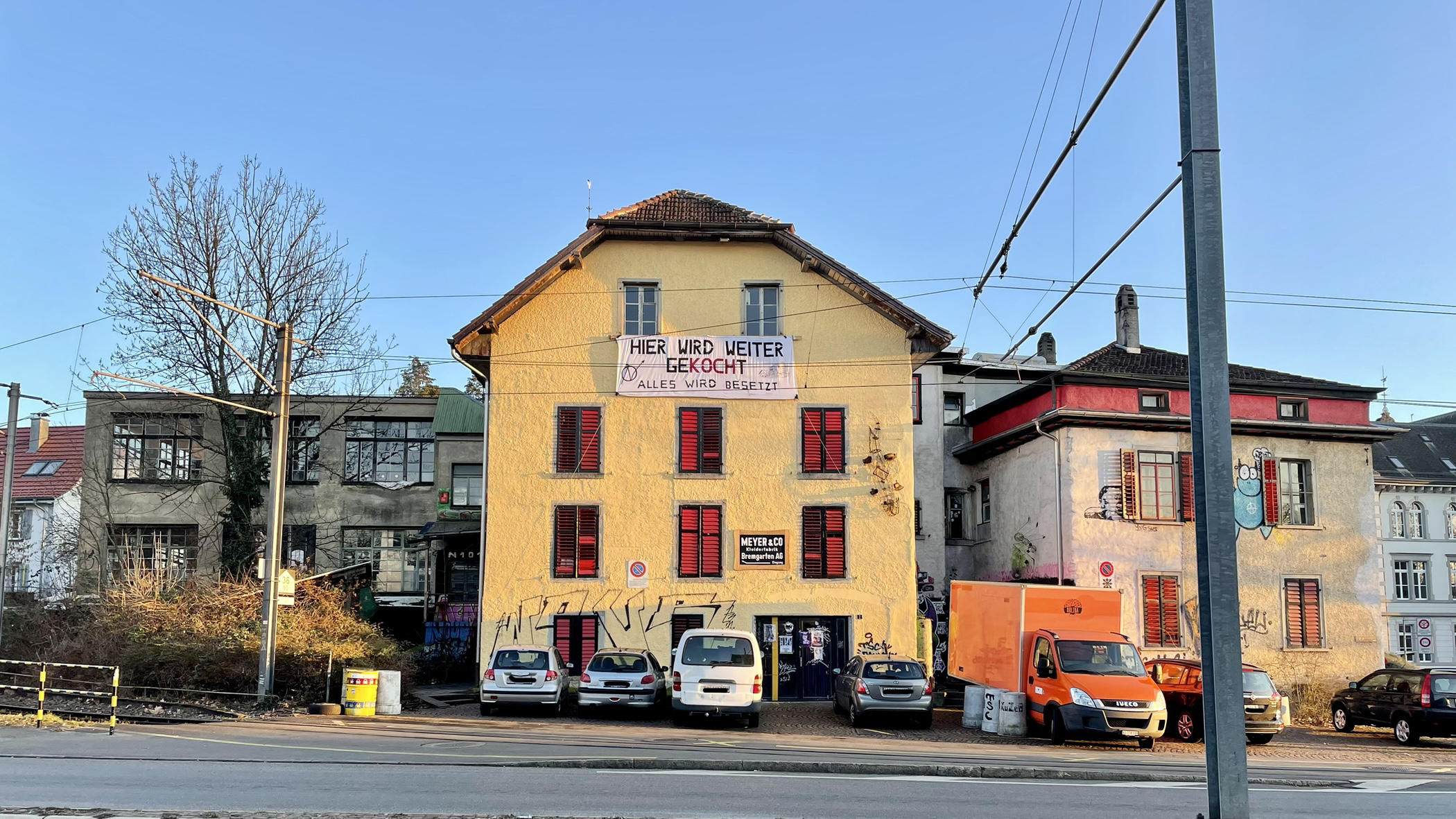
- Former names: Kleiderfabrik Meyer & Co.
- Alternative names: Kuzeb

General information
- Status: Self-managed social centre
- Type: Architectural ensemble
- Architectural style: Biedermeier, New Objectivity
- Address: Zürcherstrasse 2
- Town or city: Bremgarten, Aargau
- Country: Switzerland
- Completed: 1838, 1880, 1911/1912, 1928/1929
- Opened: Squatted in June 1990
- Inaugurated: 18 March 1992

Design and construction
- Architect(s): Fidel Leimbacher

Renovating team
- Architect(s): Johann Emil Ganz

Other information
- Public transit access: Bremgarten Obertor

Website
- www.kuzeb.ch

The Kulturzentrum Bremgarten (KuZeB) is a Swiss autonomous social centre and event venue that emerged from a former squat in 1992. It is located at Zürcherstrasse 2 in Bremgarten and is considered a symbolic place of the autonomous movement in the canton of Aargau as well as a meeting place for supra-regional social, cultural and politically motivated activities of the left-libertarians. Events of various kinds such as concerts, readings, discussions, information and counselling evenings take place regularly.

The buildings are those of the former Meyer & Co. textile factory, which was founded in 1893. The complex consists of a dwelling house built in 1838 and the two factory buildings.

== History of the textile factory ==
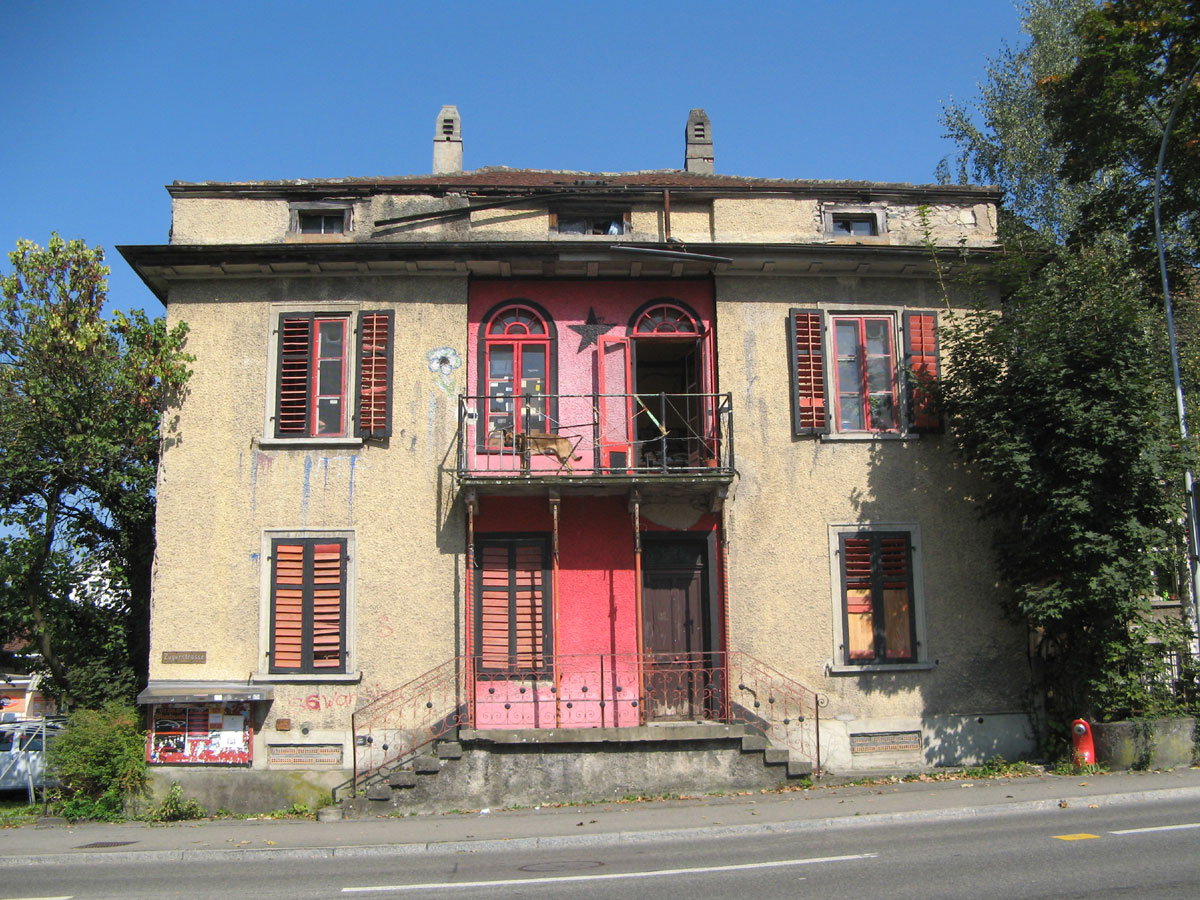
The former residential house in 2007

The Biedermeier house on Bremgarten's Obertorplatz was built in 1838 by master builder Fidel Leimbacher at his own expense. In the course of the 19th century, it was occupied by various illustrious personalities until it finally passed into the hands of the brothers Max and Simon Meyer, who founded the Gebrüder Meyer, Herren- & Berufskleiderfabrik Bremgarten (German for 'Meyer Brothers, Men's & Professional Clothing Factory Bremgarten') in the rear buildings around 1893. These were successively extended and rebuilt over the years to form an ensemble that is both a typical example of a small factory and an important example of Neues Bauen. The core building, a two-storey Biedermeier structure, is characterised by its attic, while the extensions to the rear annex date from 1880, 1911/1912 and 1928/1929.

The Meyer & Co. factory building in Bremgarten was built in 1928/1929 to plans by the Zurich architect Johann Emil Ganz. It is an important and early example of modernist architecture in the Canton of Aargau. The cubic concrete skeleton building, with its dense façade grid, extensive glazing and flat roof, was in keeping with the demands of the New Architecture movement and largely preserved the original fabric of the building, including the transverse rectangular windows. The factory building housed all production, including the tailoring and sewing workshops. The building contains two well-lit workrooms measuring 12 × 19.6 metres, which were essential for production. It is an example of pre-modern factory architecture and testifies to the rich manufacturing history of the clothing factory.

Today, the building complex presents itself in a rather patchy state of preservation. It is listed in the Inventory of Swiss Heritage Sites (ISOS) of national importance and documents a piece of Bremgarten's cultural history.

== History of the social centre ==
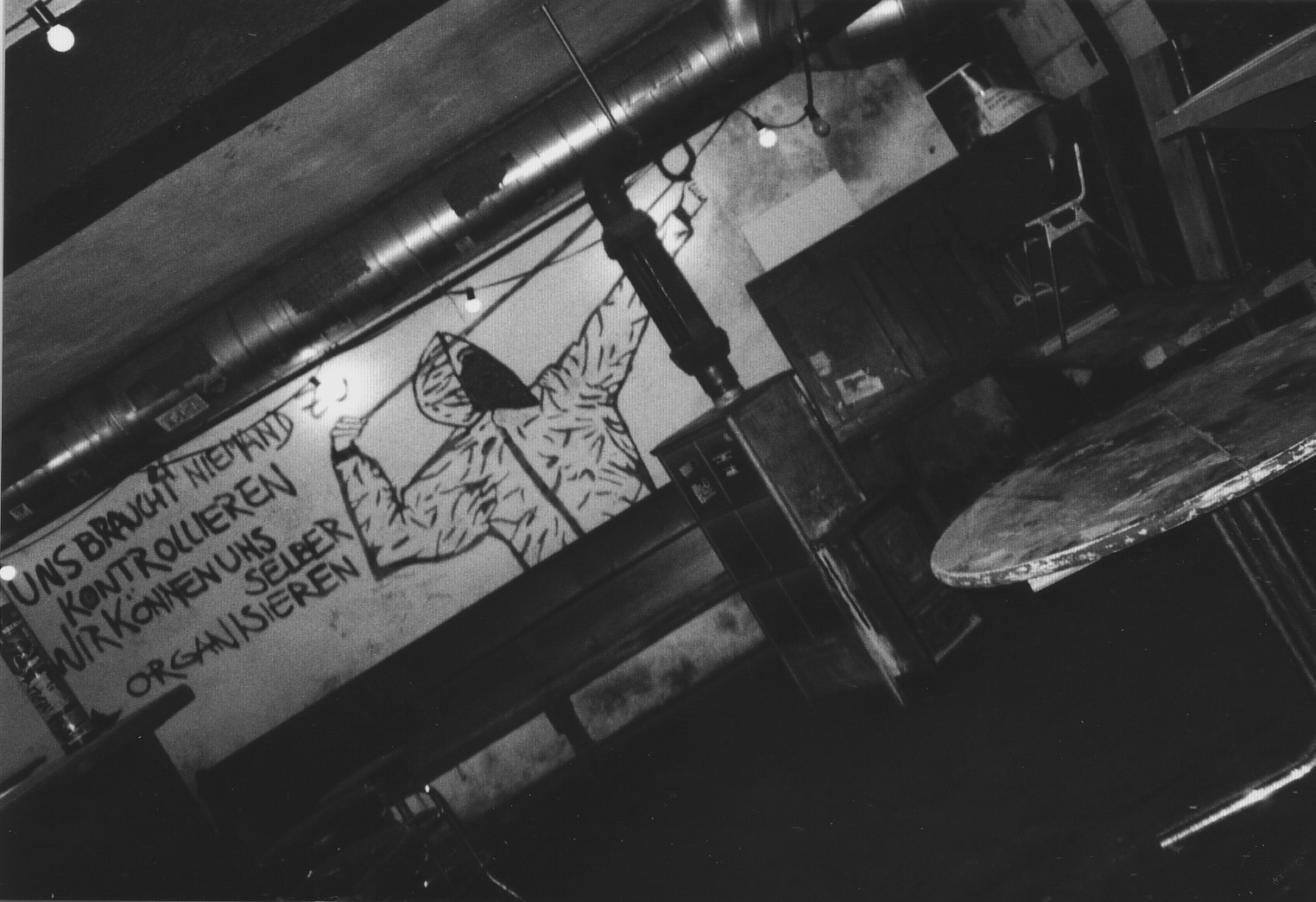
Concert cellar with slogan around 2004

In June 1990, a few young people occupied the building complex that had been abandoned to the ravages of time 16 years earlier. This complex consisted of an old textile factory, the residential part of which had been occupied by a Spanish club and a private tenant years before. The squatters turned the building into an autonomous space, building a half-pipe for skaters and two band rooms in the basement. Max Meyer, one of the two owners, had been alerted by the authorities about the conversion of the old textile factory, but did nothing further, tying their hands. So the factory project went on without any major problems until New Year 1991.

=== Threat of eviction ===
In the spring of 1991, the squatters went on the offensive and founded the Verein Kultur Zentrum Bremgarten KuZeB. Their aim was to negotiate a rental agreement with the owners. Negotiations with the Meyer brothers and the various authorities were unsuccessful. In April 1991, the city threatened to have the factory evicted by the police.

In the months that followed, however, despite city bans, regular sauvages were organised within the walls of the old factory, which were well attended and increased the enthusiasm to tackle the project again. This led to an escalation when, on 7 December 1991, the right-wing Rechtsradikale Mutschellenfront (RMF) entered the premises of the clothing factory and used them for their own purposes. As a result of the incident, the Meyer brothers received a notice to wall up the property by 15 February 1992. At the same time, AEW Energie threatened to disconnect the property from the electricity grid.

=== Foundation of the "Verein KulturZentrum Bremgarten" ===
In order to withstand the pressure, the activists re-founded the "KuZeB" association, which still exists in its current form. A plan for the use of the site was drawn up and submitted to the owners and the authorities. At the same time, a bid was made for the walling up of the building. The activists objected and questioned the offer to wall off the property, resulting in a verbal commitment from the owners. This was well received by the public and the council confirmed that they had never objected to a lease.

The 18th March 1992 is therefore considered to be the founding date of the Kulturzentrum Bremgarten.

=== Rental contract ===
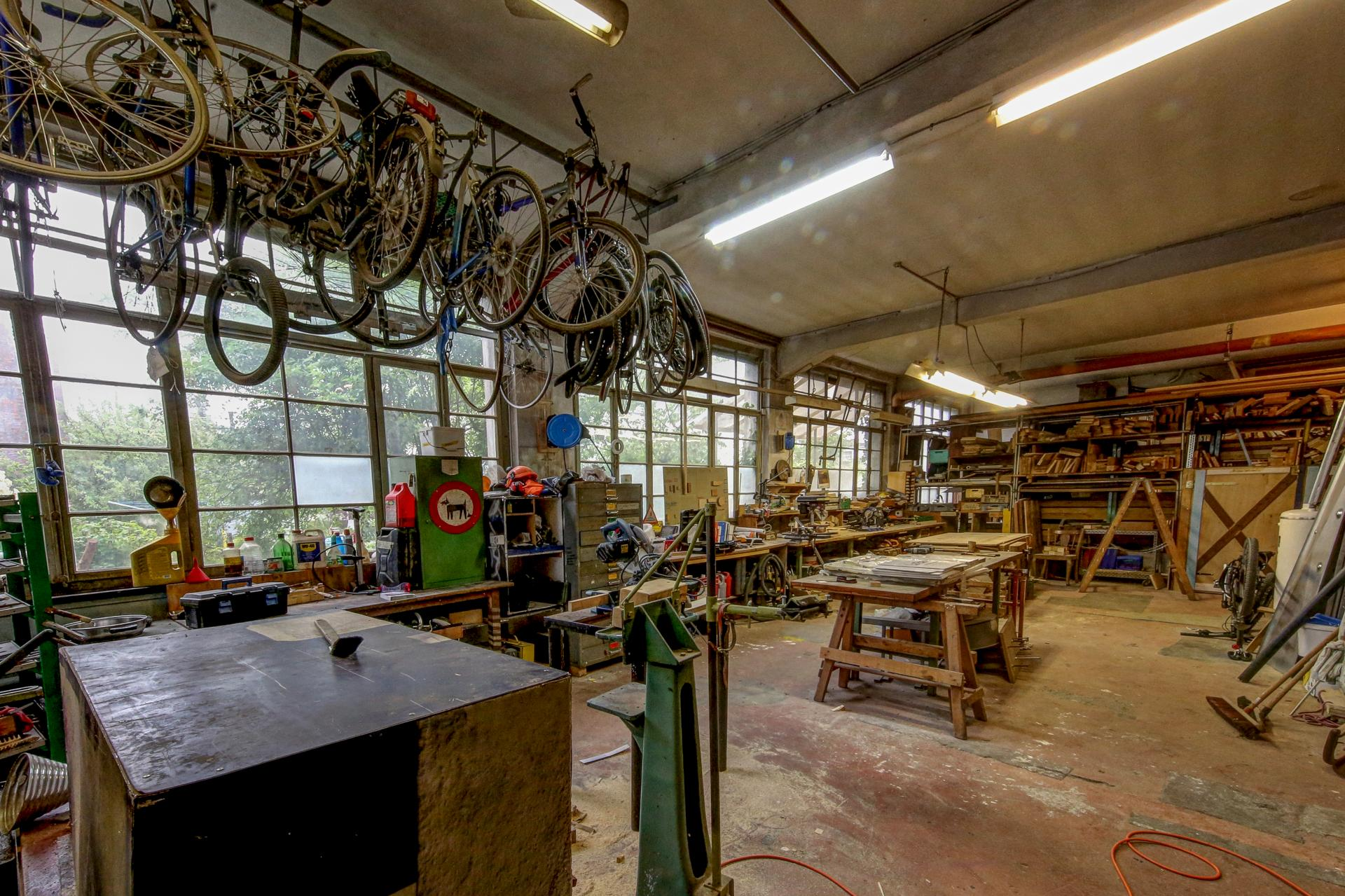
Today's workshop and former factory building from 1928/1929 - the large-scale glazing is clearly visible

A lively response to the annual Whitsun market, which included information stalls and a punk concert on the factory roof, generated a lot of interest and positive feedback. New opportunities arose in August 1992 when the Spanish Club left the premises and KuZeB took over. On 27 August 1992 the association signed a rental contract, which was never countersigned. However, the heirs of the former textile manufacturer Meyer are still content to collect a small rent for the parking spaces and part of the building. The rest is squatted. After this long period of negotiation, the concept for the use of the building could be implemented step by step.

Today, KuZeB is the oldest autonomous social centre in Switzerland that operates entirely without public funding.

=== Conflicts ===
On 7 June 2002, the Aargau cantonal police carried out a house search at the Kulturzentrum Bremgarten. A banner hanging from the house was confiscated. It showed a crossed out swastika in a prohibition sign. The reason for the search was a charge of violating the criminal law against racism. In a communiqué, the operators of the KuZeB described the action as grotesque and political satire.

KuZeB came under increasing pressure from the authorities. In order to control the free space, the authorities drew up a decree that would have brought the autonomous centre under the hospitality law. The financial, legal and organisational consequences would have meant the end of the non-commercial project. The Cantonal Department of the Interior stated that there was no comparable case and that a precedent had to be set. However, the cantonal government decided that KuZeB was not to be equated with a commercial establishment and therefore did not fall under the hospitality law.

On 29 May 2018, a police detachment searched the building as part of a request for legal assistance from Germany. A young man from Aargau, who was accused of aggravated breach of the peace and arson during the G20 riots in Hamburg, was not in Bremgarten at the time, but was later arrested in the Winterthur area. Nevertheless, the police searched his home and the cultural centre and confiscated various data carriers there.

The SVP hardliner Andreas Glarner wants to get rid of the KuZeB. The owner of the building, Max Meyer, has already had interested parties but sees no reason to sell the KuZeB. Bremgarten had hit the headlines in 2013 when asylum seekers were denied access to public facilities. Glarner threatened to buy the building to prevent asylum seekers from moving into KuZeB, and stepped up his criticism of KuZeB after unknown persons spray-painted the venue of the SVP's general assembly.

Since 2018, Glarner has been waging a legal battle against the KuZeB with the aim of removing the country's oldest autonomous cultural center, which he had repeatedly described as an eyesore. Andreas Glarner had previously expressed fears about the KuZeB after the façade of a restaurant had been sprayed with graffiti and slogans had been directed against him nearby. He even considered buying the property together with other investors. Glarner moved his office close to the KuZeB and began to take legal action against the cultural center, claiming that it violated building regulations. Despite numerous complaints and applications, his position was not supported by the local authorities. The KuZeB is now in an even better legal position than before, as municipal and cantonal authorities have officially stated that the use of the buildings as a cultural center has been legalized over the years.

== Today's programme ==
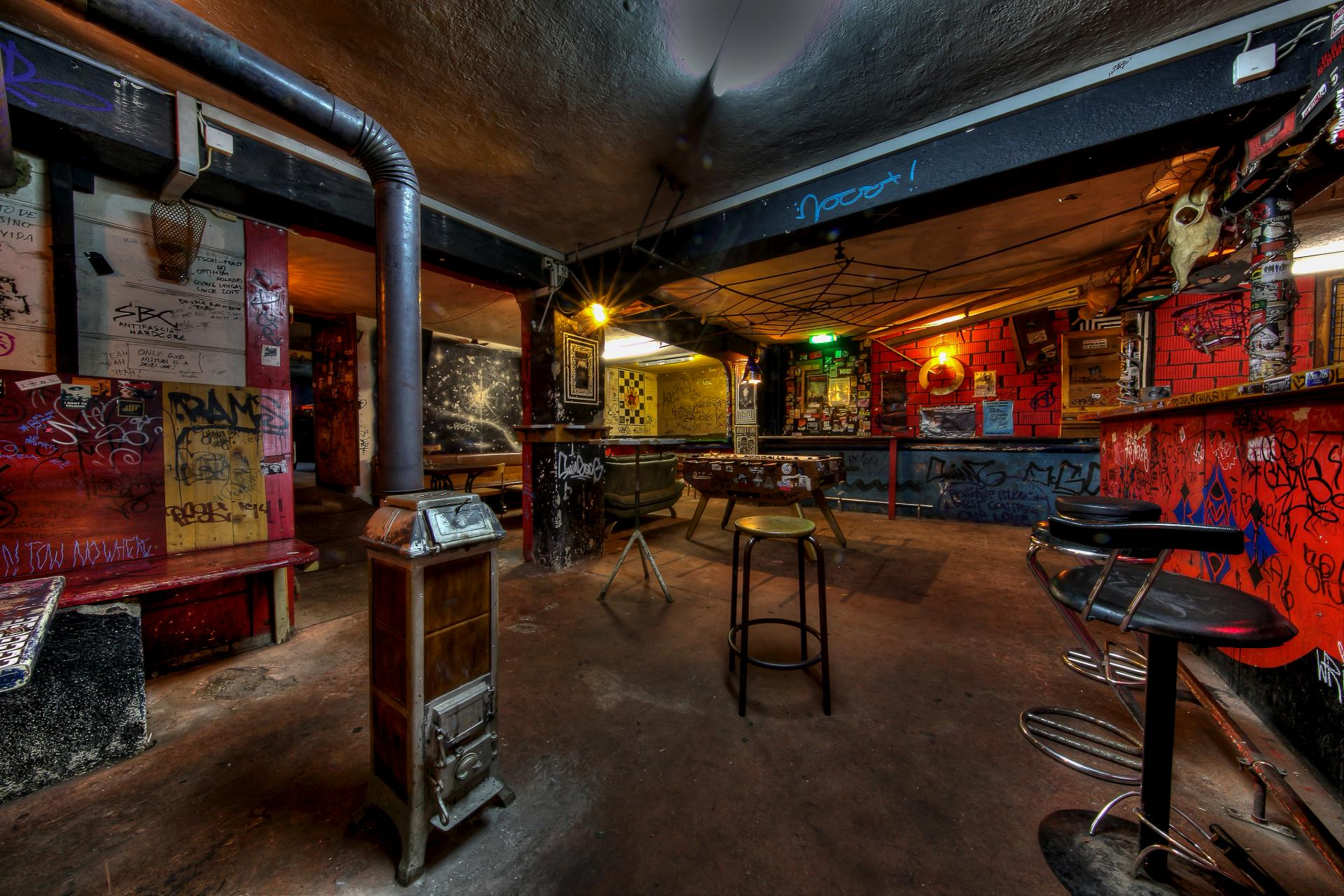
KuZeB Concert Bar

From international alternative and subcultural concerts to readings, film screenings and political talks, KuZeB's cultural programme is diverse. Two stages with bars, a cinema, a hackerspace, a freeshop, an infoshop, sewing, printing and painting studios, a wood and metal workshop, a multi-purpose hall with a half-pipe and fitness area, a rehearsal room for bands, a large garden and several storage rooms are now part of the autonomous centre where people can let off steam or engage in various activities.

KuZeB wants to experiment with different and new forms of society and life in which all participants have the same rights, duties and responsibilities. The cornerstones are humanity, solidarity, freedom of expression, trust, integration, diversity and openness. These forms should show concrete alternatives and send out a signal. The association provides a space for young people with creative ideas to experiment.

== Literature ==
- KulturZentrum Bremgarten, Kleiderfabrik Bremgarten: [20 Jahre KuZeB], Bremgarten, 2012. NB 001768822
