= Andreas Glarner =

Swiss politician (born 1962)

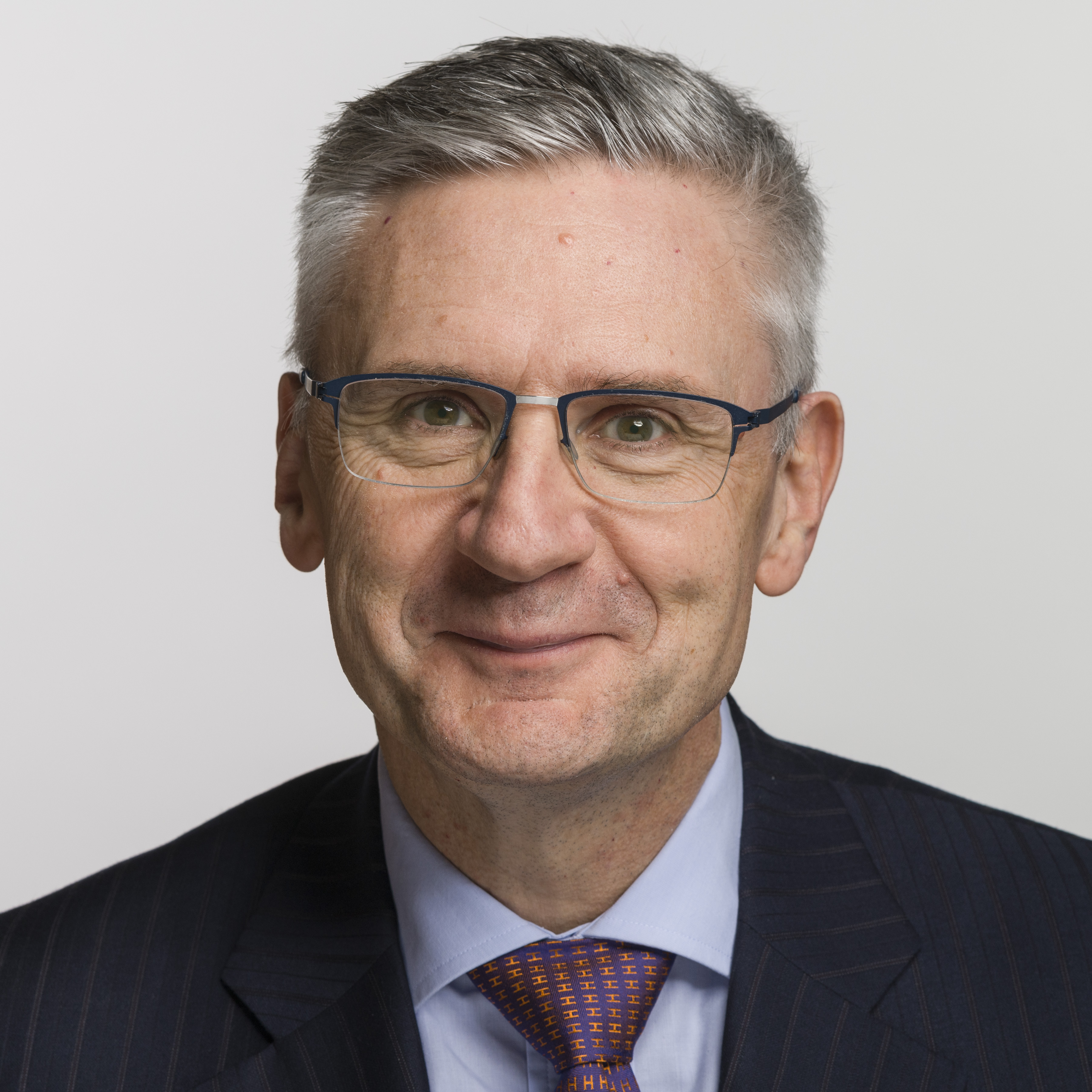
- Official portrait, 2019

Member of the National Council
- Incumbent
- Assumed office 30 November 2015
- Constituency: Canton of Aargau

Member of the Grand Council of Aargau
- In office 10 April 2001 – 1 August 2015

Personal details
- Born: Andreas Alfred Glarner; 9 October 1962 (age 63) Glarus, Switzerland
- Party: Swiss People's Party
- Children: 2
- Occupation: Businessman, politician
- Website: Official website Parliament website

Military service
- Allegiance: Switzerland
- Branch/service: Swiss Armed Forces
- Years of service: 1980 - 1999
- Rank: Private soldier

Andreas Alfred "Andy" Glarner (/ˈɡlɑrnɚ/; GLAR-nur; born 9 October 1962) is a Swiss businessman and politician who has been serving on the National Council (Switzerland) for the Swiss People's Party since 2015. He previously served on the Grand Council of Aargau from 2001 to 2015.

== Early life and education ==
Glarner was born 9 October 1962 in Glarus, Switzerland, the second of four children, to Hans-Rudolf Glarner (1939–2025), a carpenter, and Louise Glarner (née Boss), a laboratory assistant. He has three siblings; Sabina Glarner, Heidi Fluor (née Glarner) and Alex Glarner (1963–2018).

His father and grandfather, where initially left-leaning active members of the Social Democratic Party. His grandfather served as a member of the city council of Bremgarten, Aargau. His father, Hans-Rudolf Glarner, was briefly an authorized officer, for Horgenglarus, the oldest Swiss table and chair manufacturer. He later was active in a creative and advertising agency.

Initially, Glarner and his siblings were raised in Netstal and after his parents were divorced in 1974, he subsequently moved to Dietikon near Zurich. His father remained in Glarus. Glarner completed the local schools and then completed an apprenticeship as ventilation plumber. He initially did not seek tertiary education, only later he completed additional educational programs in business administration.

== Career ==
In 1984, he began to work for Rohner Ventilationsspenglerei AG (a ventilation plumbing company) in Urdorf. He became the general manager in 1987 at the age of 25. In 1991, he left to start his own company in Oberwil-Lieli, initially a sole proprietorship called Airproduct Andreas Glarner, later becoming a stock corporation which he subsequently sold to Galenica in 2017. The business was primarily active in the trading of care products such as wheelchairs, and crutches. Through this venture, he became a self-made millionaire at age 45.

Today, Glarner holds several participations in trading as well as real estate. He is a member of the board of several stock corporations and LLCs, namely; Omnitrade Handels AG, a trading company, based in Oberwil-Lieli, Vinotrade AG, a wine trading firm, in Oberwil-Lieli, nature products Switzerland llc, a cosmetics trading firm, in Oberwil-Lieli as well as the real estate firms 5620.ch GmbH, Bieri Verwaltungs AG and Kaeser, Glarner & Partner. From 1995 to its dissolution he was the president of the Aargauische Vaterländische Vereinigung (en. Argovian Fatherland Association), a right-wing nationalist association. He is currently the president of sifa - Sicherheit für Alle.

== Politics ==
Between 2001 and 2015 he served as a member of the Grand Council of Aargau, where he presided the parliamentary group of the Swiss People's Party from 2005 to 2015. Between 1998 and 2017 he served on the municipal council of Oberwil-Lieli, since 2006 as mayor.

Since 2015, he serves as National Councillor on the National Council.

== Personal life ==
Glarner is divorced and has two children.
