= Thomas Burgherr =

Swiss politician (born 1962)

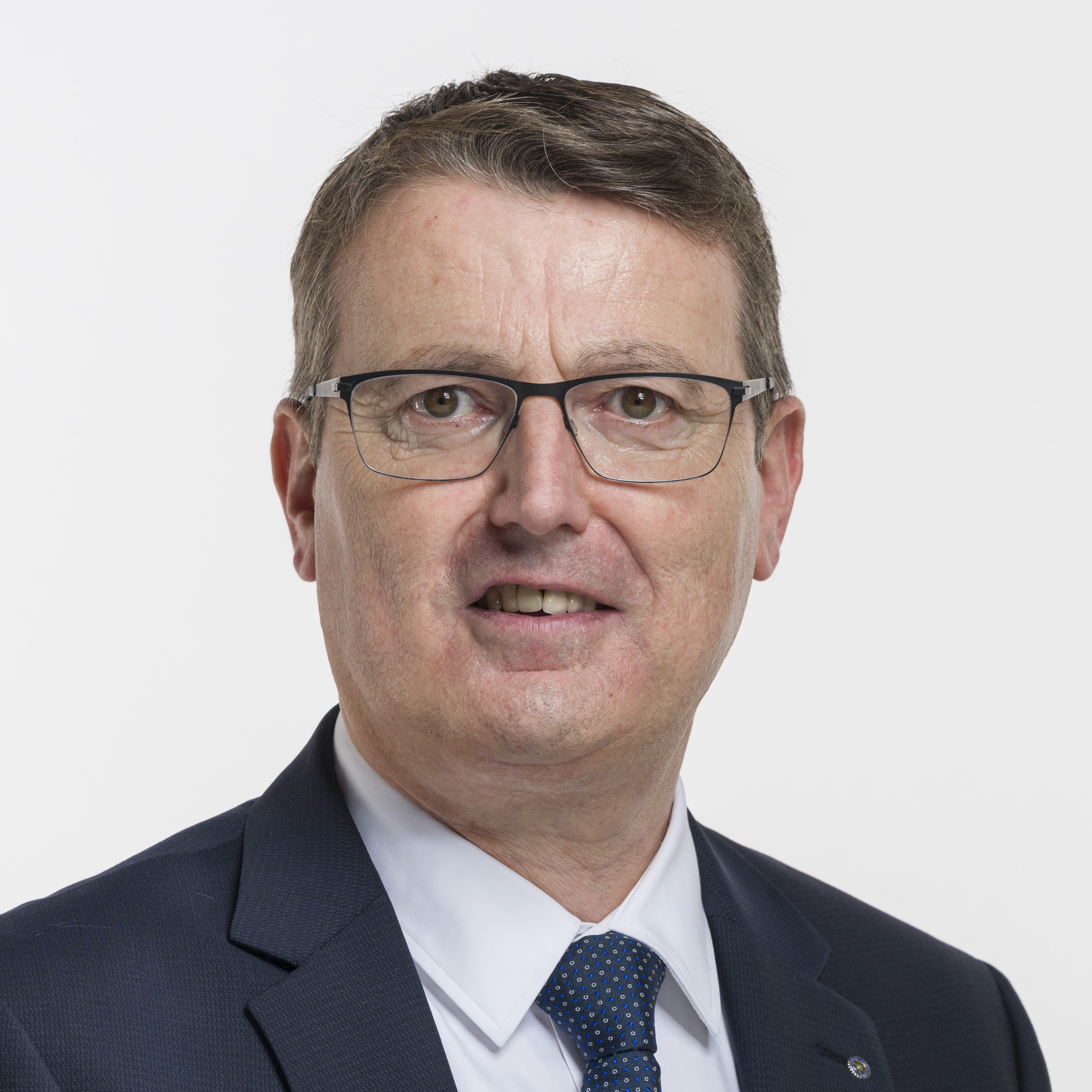
- Official portrait, 2019

Member of the National Council (Switzerland)
- Incumbent
- Assumed office 30 November 2015
- Constituency: Canton of Aargau

President of the Swiss People's Party of Aargau
- In office 1 January 2012 – 31 December 2020

Personal details
- Born: Thomas Burgherr; 1 August 1962 (age 63) Zofingen, Switzerland
- Party: Swiss People's Party
- Spouse: Sabrina Leu (m. 1993)
- Occupation: Businessman, politician, adjunct professor
- Website: Official website Parliament website

Military service
- Allegiance: Switzerland
- Branch/service: Swiss Armed Forces
- Rank: Soldier

Thomas Burgherr (German pronunciation: [ˈtoːmas ˈbʊrɡhɛr]; born 1 August 1962) is a Swiss businessman and politician who currently serves as a member of the National Council (Switzerland) for the Swiss People's Party since 2015. He has previously served as president of the Swiss People's Party of Aargau between 2012 and 2020 being succeeded by Andreas Glarner.

== Early life and education ==
Burgherr was born 1 August 1962 in Zofingen, Switzerland to Hans Burgherr and Elisabeth Burgherr (née Hochuli). He was primarily raised in Wiliberg, a small municipality, in the Zofingen District of the Canton of Aargau. He attended the local public schools in Wiliberg and Reitnau. He completed an apprenticeship as a carpenter and completed several diplomas in this field (until the masters diploma in carpentry).

== Professional career ==
After completing his carpentry education he entered the family business, Burgherr holding, a timber construction and trading company which has been family-owned and operated since 1866. He currently is the controlling shareholder and chairman of the company. The Burgherr holding includes the following divisions; Burgherr Motorsäge Ltd. (timber construction and trading) and Burgherr Immobilien Ltd. (real estate). He additionally is a member of the board of directors of Casamondo Ltd. in Zug which is active in real estate development.

Concurrently, he is also a professor of carpentry at the University of Applied Science for Wood Working in Biel/Bienne. Burgherr is president of the tunAargau Association. The association, which already exists in some cantons of Switzerland, wants to sensitize children and young people from 6 to 13 years for technical and scientific professions. As part of an adventure show, the children and young people are invited to a research laboratory and an adventure workshop. The sponsoring association tunAargau is a private initiative of industry, trade and commerce and is supported by the University of Applied Sciences Northwestern Switzerland.

== Politics ==
From 1992 to 2000 he was vice mayor in the municipality of Wiliberg. In 1997, he was elected to the Grand Council of Aargau and campaigned on the commissions for education, culture and sport (until 2005) and for the university of applied sciences (until 2001). Between 2005 and 2009 he was the president of the audit committee. In 2009, he was a member of the commission for economic affairs and Taxes. From 2012 to 2020 he was president of the Swiss People's Party Aargau, his successor was national councillor Andreas Glarner. In October 2015 he was elected to National Council and has since been a member of the state political commission.

== Personal life ==
Burgherr is married to Sabrina (née Leu) and has three children. He resides in Wiliberg.
