= Johannes Aal =

Swiss Roman Catholic theologian, composer and playwright

Johannes Aal (c. 1500 – 28 May 1553) was a Swiss Roman Catholic theologian, composer and dramaturg.

Aal was born in Bremgarten, Switzerland, and was pastor there until 1529. Then, he became Leutpriester in Baden until 1536. At the collegiate church of Solothurn, he became preacher and choir leader in 1538. From 1544 to 1551, he was provost of the college of canons, where he died.

He is the author of the tragedy Johannes der Täufer (St. John Baptist) in which it was first performed in 1549 in Bern. The piece has a duration of two days with four acts each. It includes burlesques, romantic scenes, and satirical elements. Its satire derides all classes and the court as well as curiosity, passion for finery, loquacity and the art of seduction of women.

As a musician, he composed a tune in 16 verses on Saint Maurice and Saint Ursus of Solothurn.

== Sources ==
- Allgemeine Deutsche Biographie - online version
- Johannes Aal in German, French and Italian in the online Historical Dictionary of Switzerland.
