= Public Transport Victoria =

Former public transport brand in Victoria, Australia

Agency overview
- Formed: 2 April 2012
- Preceding agencies: Metlink; Transport Ticketing Authority
- Dissolved: 30 June 2019 (statutory authority); 31 July 2025 (online services)
- Superseding agency: Transport Victoria
- Type: Statutory authority
- Jurisdiction: Government of Victoria
- Headquarters: Collins Street, Melbourne, Australia
- Employees: 504 (June 2018)
- Minister responsible: Vicki Ward, Minister for Public Transport
- Agency executives: Jeroen Weimar, CEO (2016–2019); Mark Wild, CEO (2014–2016); Ian Dobbs, CEO (2012–2014)
- Parent department: Department of Transport and Planning
- Website: transport.vic.gov.au

Public Transport Victoria (PTV) is the brand name for public transport in Victoria, Australia from April 2012. Until 2019, it was also the trading name of the Public Transport Development Authority (PTDA), a now-defunct statutory authority in Victoria that was responsible for providing, coordinating, and promoting public transport.

PTV public transport symbols, from left to right: metropolitan train, tram, bus, regional train, coach, ferry, and SkyBus.

PTV began operating on 2 April 2012, replacing the Metlink and Viclink brands introduced in 2003 and 2006. It took over many of the responsibilities previously exercised by the Director of Public Transport and the Department of Transport, and also took over the myki ticketing system, formerly handled by the Transport Ticketing Authority.

PTV's functions were transferred to the Department of Transport and Planning (DTP) on 1 July 2019. PTV's online services were migrated to Transport Victoria from August 2025 onwards. As of May 2026, most vehicles, stops and stations continue to show the PTV logo.

== Governance ==
PTV was the trading name of the Public Transport Development Authority (PTDA). The PTDA was established by the Transport Legislation Amendment (Public Transport Development Authority) Act 2011, passed by the Parliament of Victoria in November 2011, which positioned the agency under the State's primary transport statute, the Transport Integration Act 2010. The legislation provides that the "...primary object of the Public Transport Development Authority is to plan, coordinate, provide, operate and maintain a safe, punctual, reliable and clean public transport system....".

== Key functions ==
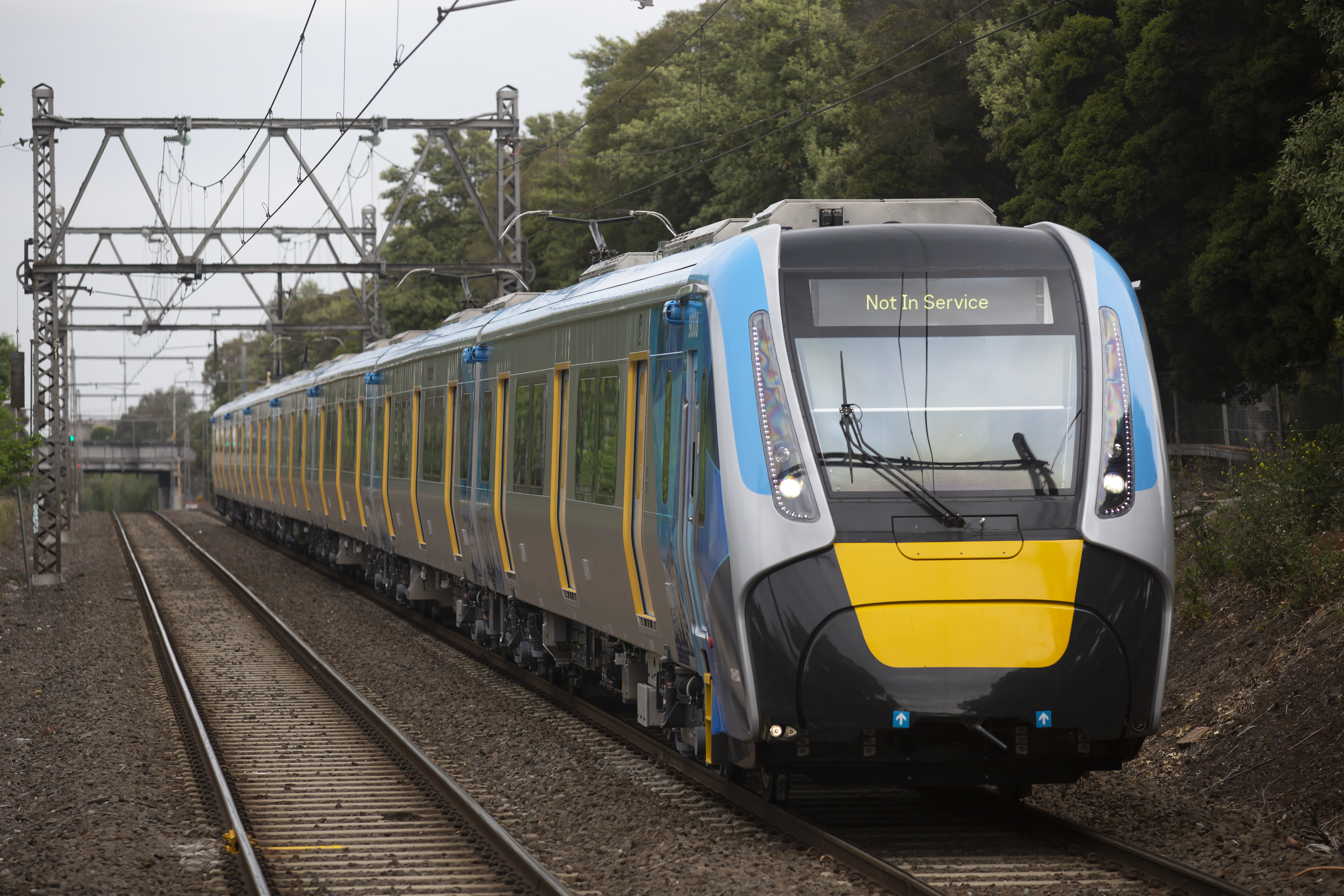
Metro Trains Melbourne HCMT 9008 at Seddon

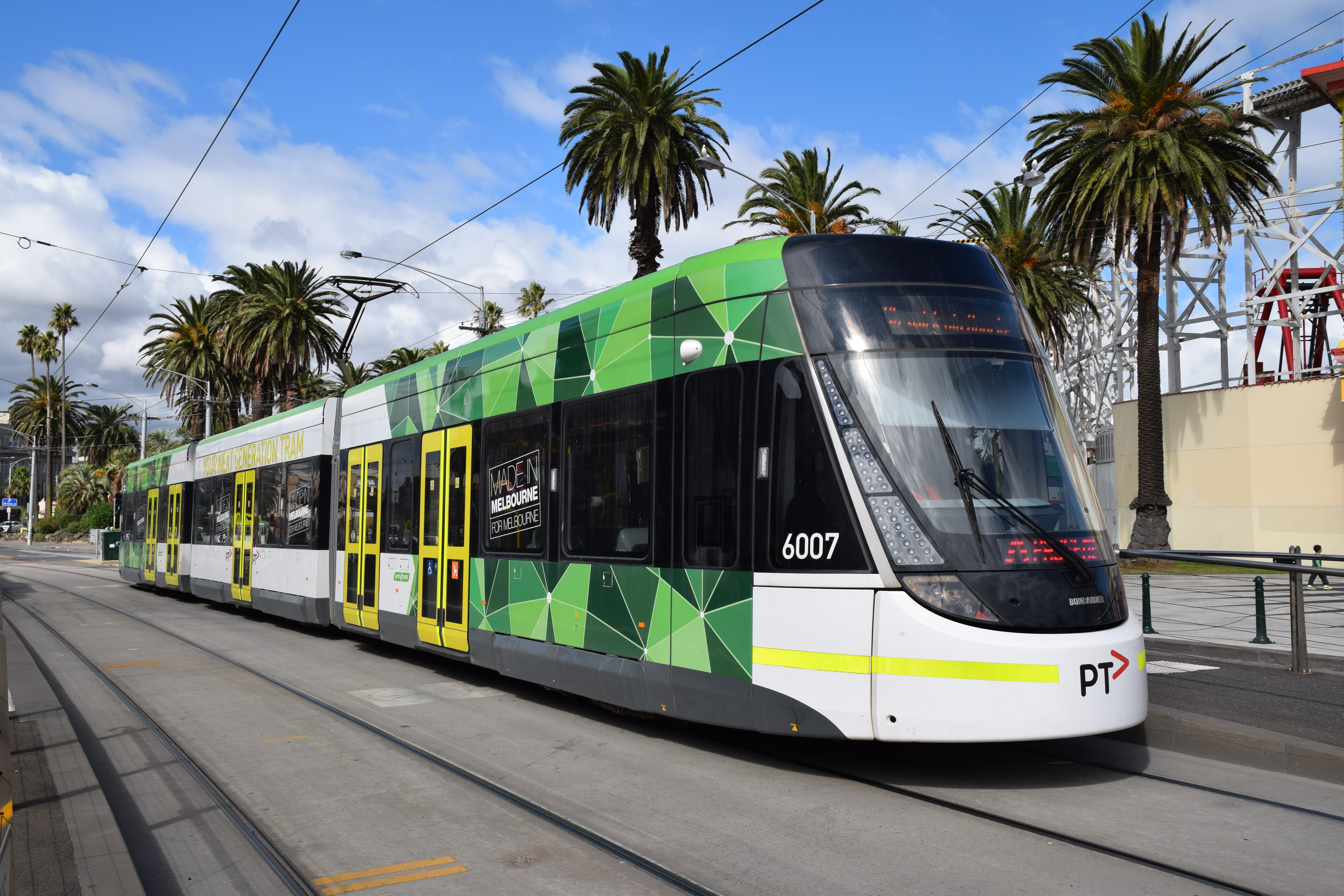
Yarra Trams E-class tram

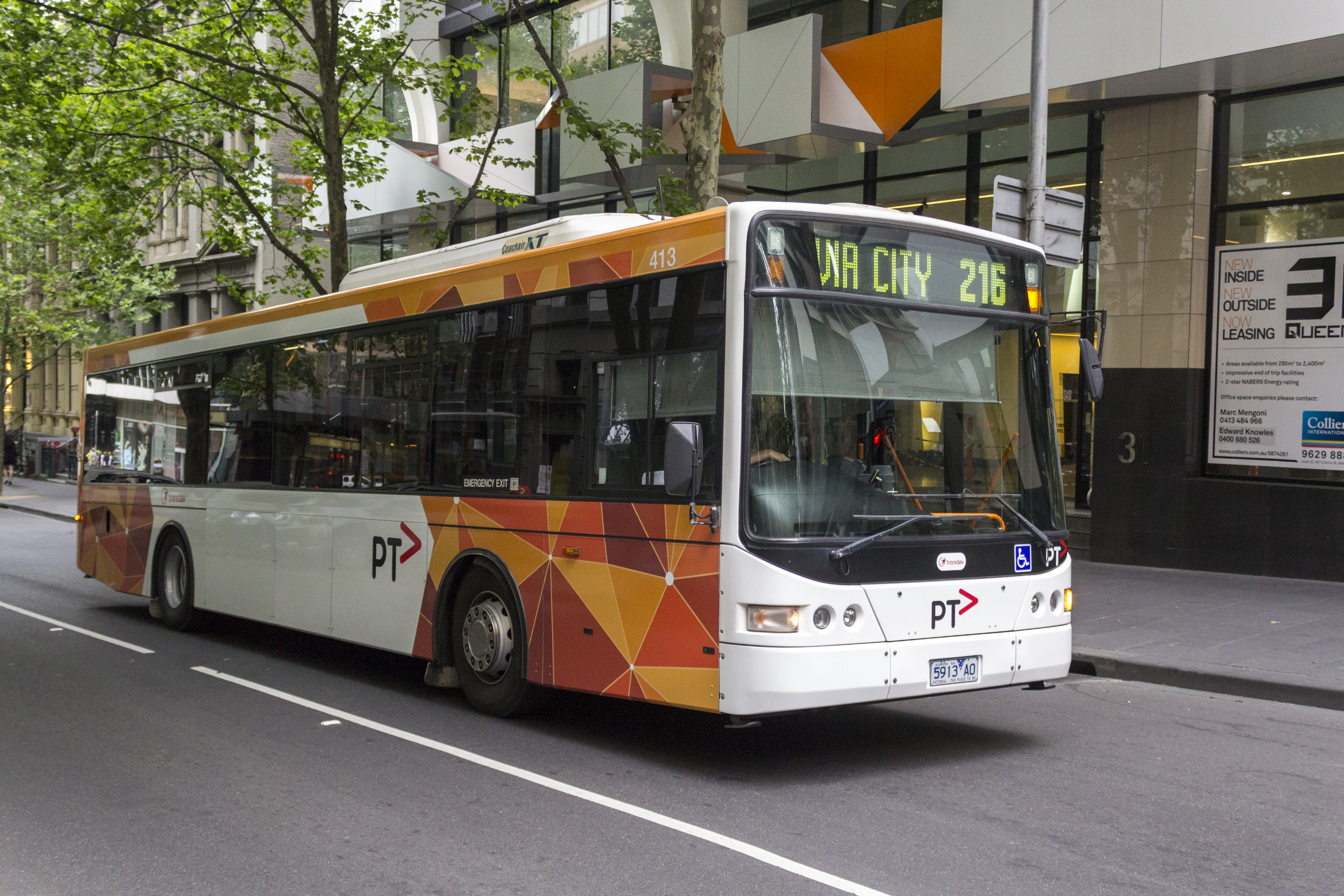
Transdev Melbourne Volgren bodied Scania K230UB in Queen Street in December 2013

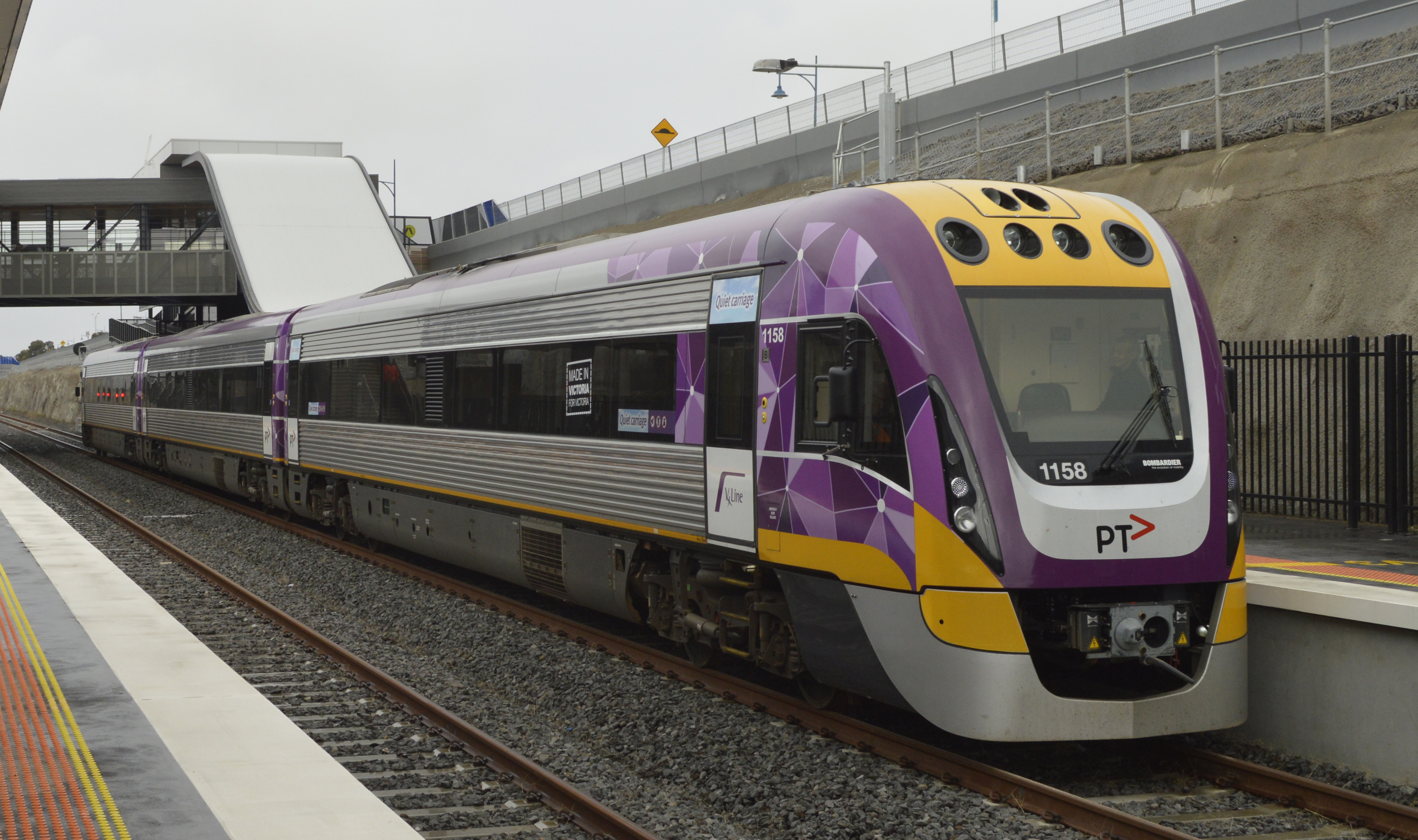
V/Line VLocity train at Wyndham Vale

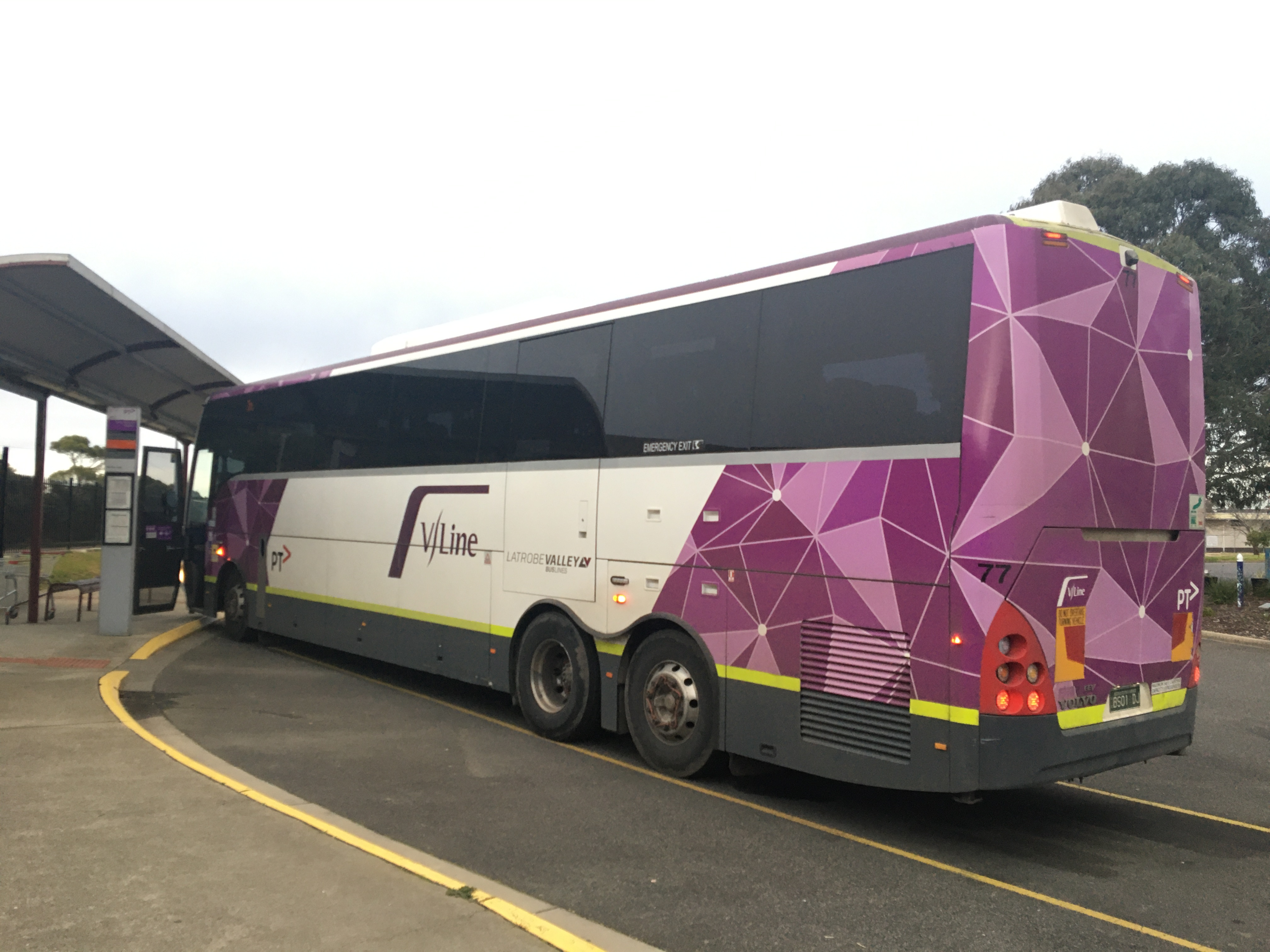
A V/Line coach stopped at a bus rank at Sale railway station

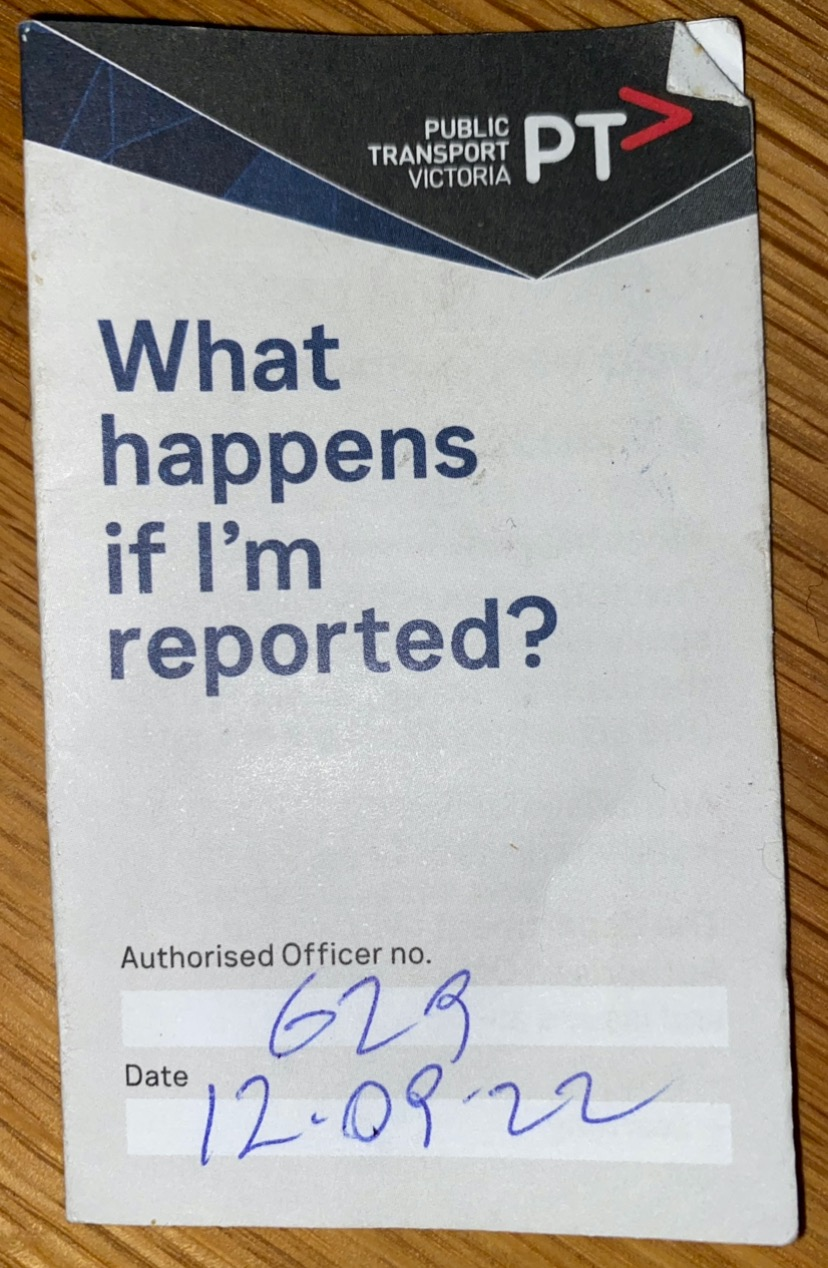
Leaflet given to alleged fare-evaders after being booked by authorised officers

=== Government expectations ===
In 2011, when introducing the legislation, the Minister for Public Transport, Terry Mulder, observed that:

"This bill is an essential step to fix the problems in Victoria's public transport system. The bill establishes a new statutory authority, the Public Transport Development Authority (PTDA), to plan, coordinate and manage all metropolitan and regional train, tram, and bus services.

The PTDA will focus on the basics of a good public transport system.

It will be responsible and accountable for achieving significant improvement in the reliability, efficiency, and integration of public transport services across the state.

In a key change of focus, the new authority will put passengers first.

It will operate as the face of public transport, providing a single shopfront for passengers and stakeholders.

No longer will Victorians have to endure the confusion, the blame shifting, and the frustration that characterised the state's troubled public transport system over the previous decade."

=== Contracting activities with train, tram, and bus operators ===
PTV enters into contracts with transport operators on behalf of the State to provide train, tram, and bus services throughout Victoria. The key franchise contracts which were transferred to PTV from the former Director of Public Transport relate to:

- Trains in Melbourne (contract with Metro Trains Melbourne) – covering suburban rail services in Melbourne.
- Trams in Melbourne (with Yarra Journey Makers) – covering suburban tram and light rail services in Melbourne.
- Trains in regional Victoria (with V/Line Corporation) – covering train services in country Victoria.
- Bus services in Melbourne and throughout Victoria (with a large number of bus operators, and their umbrella body, the Bus Association of Victoria) – covering suburban and regional bus routes, school bus services and the demand-responsive transport system FlexiRide.

VicTrack, the custodian of all rail infrastructure and assets in Victoria, leases the metropolitan train and tram infrastructure and assets to PTV through the Metropolitan Infrastructure Head Lease. PTV then sub-leases the assets to the metropolitan train and tram operators through Infrastructure Leases. PTV manages the rights and obligations contained in these leases on behalf of the State. PTV also enters into franchise agreements with the metropolitan train and tram operators that govern the provision of public transport services. The franchise agreements specify a range of operational and service requirements administered and managed by PTV.

Regional rail services operated by V/Line Corporation are subject to similar arrangements involving VicTrack and PTV. VicTrack leases the regional rail infrastructure and assets to PTV which then sub-leases them to V/Line under the Regional Infrastructure Lease. Similarly, PTV and V/Line have entered into a franchise agreement that governs the operational and service requirements for regional rail services.

== PTV's position in the transport portfolio ==
PTV was one of the statutory agencies in the Victorian transport portfolio whose activities are coordinated by the Department of Transport and Planning. These agencies can be divided into three main types: statutory offices, statutory authorities, and independent transport safety agencies.

Together with the DoT, the agencies provide, manage, and regulate transport system activities in Victoria including:

- heavy and light rail systems including trains and trams
- roads systems and vehicles including cars, trucks, and bicycles
- ports and waterways including commercial ships and recreational vessels
- some air transport systems.

== Key people ==
The inaugural chairman and chief executive officer (CEO) of PTV was Ian Dobbs, who had headed the former Victorian Public Transport Corporation between 1993 and 1998. On 1 February 2014, the positions of chairman and CEO were split, as provided for in the original legislation, and Mark Wild was appointed CEO of PTV, with Dobbs remaining as chairman until his appointment was not renewed. Mark Wild resigned as CEO following several network failures in January 2016, and Jeroen Weimar took over as Acting CEO and was appointed to a full-time position in September 2016. He remained CEO until the functions of PTV were absorbed into the Department of Transport in 2019.

PTV also had its own Board, including a community representative. The board was disbanded in 2018, and an executive board replaced it until the functions of PTV passed to the Department of Transport.

== Authorised officers ==
Authorised officers perform a ticket inspection role across the public transport network and have special powers on buses, trains, and trams, as well as at public transport stops and stations. They have the authority to ask to see a passenger's ticket or concession card and to confiscate tickets for use as evidence or in some cases other items. If they reasonably believe an offence has occurred, they have the authority to ask for a passenger's name, address, and proof of identity, and they can make a report to the Department of Transport and Planning and may issue a fine to the offender. Authorised officers can also arrest passengers in some circumstances but cannot use unnecessary force.

The conduct of some authorised officers has been the subject of public concern due to complaints about the excessive use of force. In 2013, a 15-year-old girl was picked up and tackled after assaulting two officers due to being stopped over a ticketing offence. There were 220 formal complaints about authorised officers in the 2013 financial year, compared with 138 a year earlier.

== Abolition ==
PTV ceased to exist as an independent entity on 30 June 2019, merging with the road maintenance functions of VicRoads to create the Department of Transport, later the Department of Transport and Planning (DTP). A transport branding strategy was proposed to be completed before the merge took effect, but did not occur until August 2025, when the PTV website was migrated over to a new Transport Victoria website. Although the X'Trapolis 2.0, G class trams and certain new buses (particularly buses from Transit Systems) feature the new "T" logo, as of mid 2026, the PTV logo, branding and signage is still seen on the app and most vehicles, train stations, and bus and tram stops. Additionally, newly built VLocity sets continued to receive the PTV logos as late as November 2025.

== See also ==
- Transport in Australia
- Rail transport in Victoria
- Railways in Melbourne
- Roads in Victoria
- Trams in Melbourne
- Public Transport Corporation
