= Authorised officer =

Person who has been appointed to perform certain compliance and enforcement duties

An authorised officer (AO) is a person who has been appointed by a government department or agency to perform certain compliance and enforcement duties.

In Australia, authorised officer roles have been created under many Commonwealth and state Acts of Parliament. Individuals are appointed to the role by the relevant government department or agency - some examples include the education departments of the states and territories, the Commonwealth Department of Agriculture, the Victorian Department of Transport, and the Western Australian Department of Water and Environmental Regulation.

== Authorised officers in Victoria ==
Authorised officers under the Transport (Compliance and Miscellaneous) Act 1983 are employed by the public transport operators to perform a ticket inspection role across the Victorian public transport system. These authorised officers have the power to inspect passengers' tickets, request a person's name and address if they believe an offence has been committed, and arrest a person if they believe it is necessary to ensure their appearance before the court.

Authorised officers serving under the Department of Jobs, Precincts and Regions include animal health officers, biosecurity officers, chemical standards officers, child employment officers, compliance officers, earth resources inspectors, forest compliance officers, plant standards officers and veterinary officers.

The Environment Protection Authority Victoria appoints authorised officers to inspect premises and enforce the Environment Protection Act 1970.

Children's services authorised officers are employed by the Department of Education and Training.

Wildlife officers are authorised officers appointed by the Department of Environment, Land, Water and Planning.
