= Bremgarten, Aargau =

Bremgarten
- Municipality
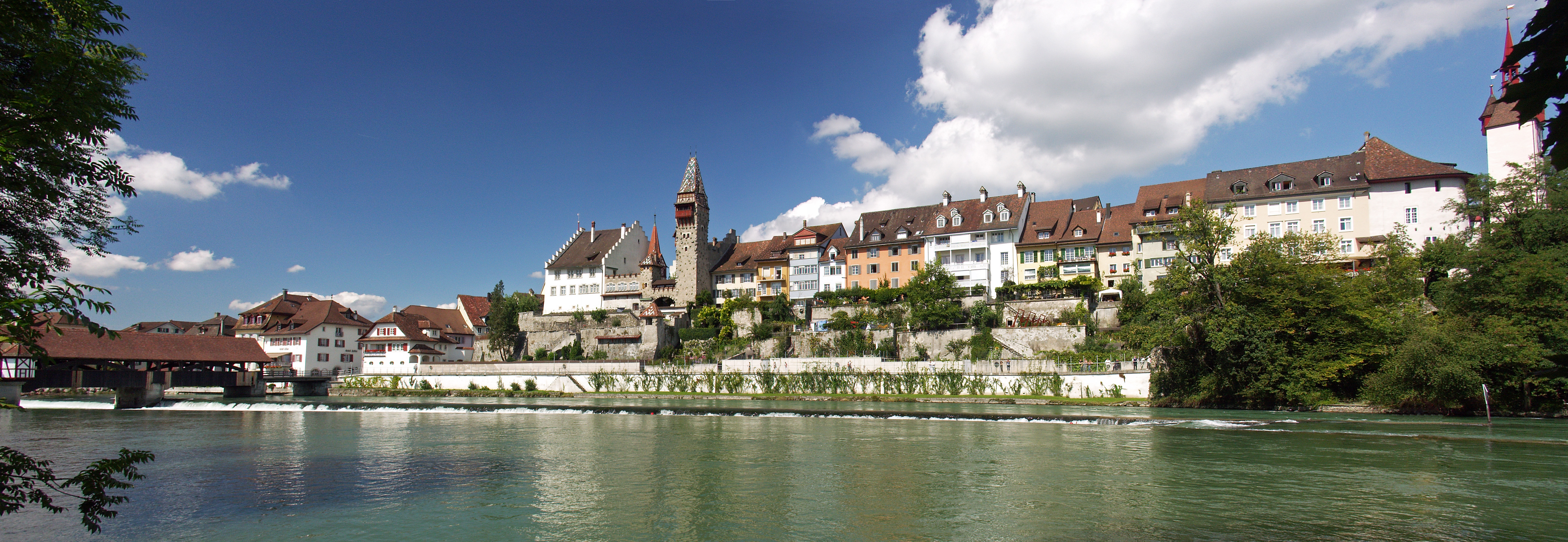

- Flag Coat of arms
- Location of Bremgarten
- Location within Switzerland Location within Canton of Aargau
- Coordinates: 47°21′N 8°20′E
- Country: Switzerland
- Canton: Aargau
- District: Bremgarten

Government
  - Executive: Stadtrat with 5 members
  - Mayor: Stadtammann (list); Raymond Tellenbach (as of March 2014)

Area
  - Total: 8.02 km^{2} (3.10 sq mi)
- Elevation: 386 m (1,266 ft)
- Highest elevation (Spannhölzli): 475 m (1,558 ft)
- Lowest elevation (Hegnau-Flussschlaufe): 358 m (1,175 ft)

Population (December 2020)
  - Total: 8,415
  - Density: 1,050/km^{2} (2,720/sq mi)
- Time zone: UTC+01:00 (CET)
  - Summer (DST): UTC+02:00 (CEST)
- Postal code: 5620
- SFOS number: 4063
- ISO 3166 code: CH-AG
- Surrounded by: Eggenwil, Fischbach-Göslikon, Hermetschwil-Staffeln, Waltenschwil, Wohlen, Zufikon
- Website: www.bremgarten.ch

Bremgarten is a municipality in the Swiss canton of Aargau. It serves as seat of the district of Bremgarten. The medieval old town is listed as a heritage site of national significance. In 2013, Bremgarten was the first municipality in Europe to introduce laws forbidding asylum seekers from visiting certain public places such as libraries, swimming pools, schools and churches.

On 1 January 2014 the former municipality of Hermetschwil-Staffeln merged into the municipality of Bremgarten.

== History ==
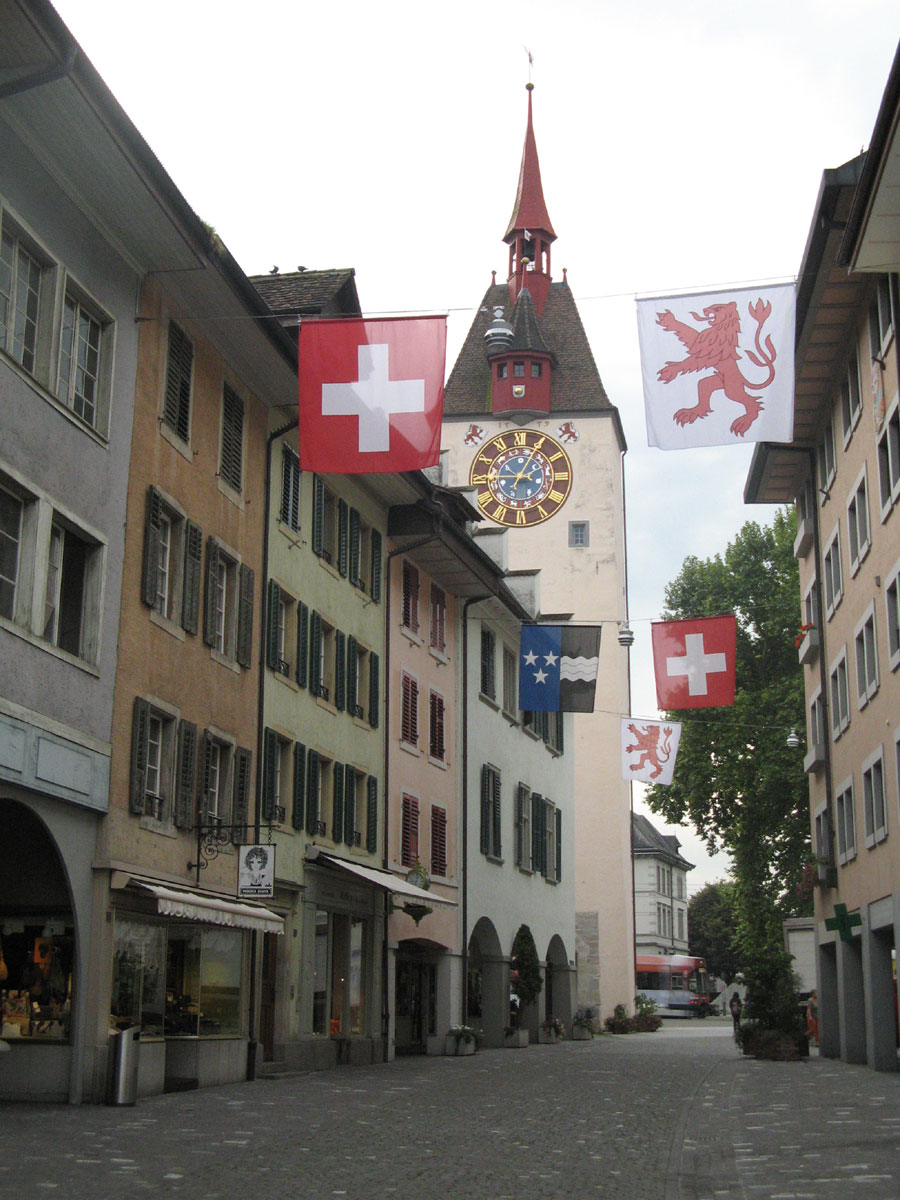
Spittel tower in Bremgarten

The area was known before 1140 as Bremgarten, though the city wasn't founded until almost a century later. In 1230, a settlement was founded near the present location of Bremgarten. Then, in 1238/39 it was mentioned as Bremegarten. In 1258, it was granted city right by Rudolf I of Habsburg. Bremgarten's population grew rapidly, and it became an important market town with an outstanding Latin school. Because it was part of the Habsburg lands, the residents of Bremgarten fought at the Battles of Morgarten (1315) and Sempach on the Habsburg side.

In 1379, a courthouse was built in Bremgarten, serving as center of a new legal district. Berikon joined Bremgarten in 1374. Later, in 1410, Unterlunkhofen, Oberlunkhofen, Jonen and Arni joined. Oberwil-Lieli joined in 1429, Rudolfstetten-Friedlisberg in 1430, and finally Huserhof in 1482. Two districts were created: a "high" one for Ober- and Unterlunkhofen, Arni, Islisberg, Jonen, Werd and Huserhof and a "lower" one for the remaining village.

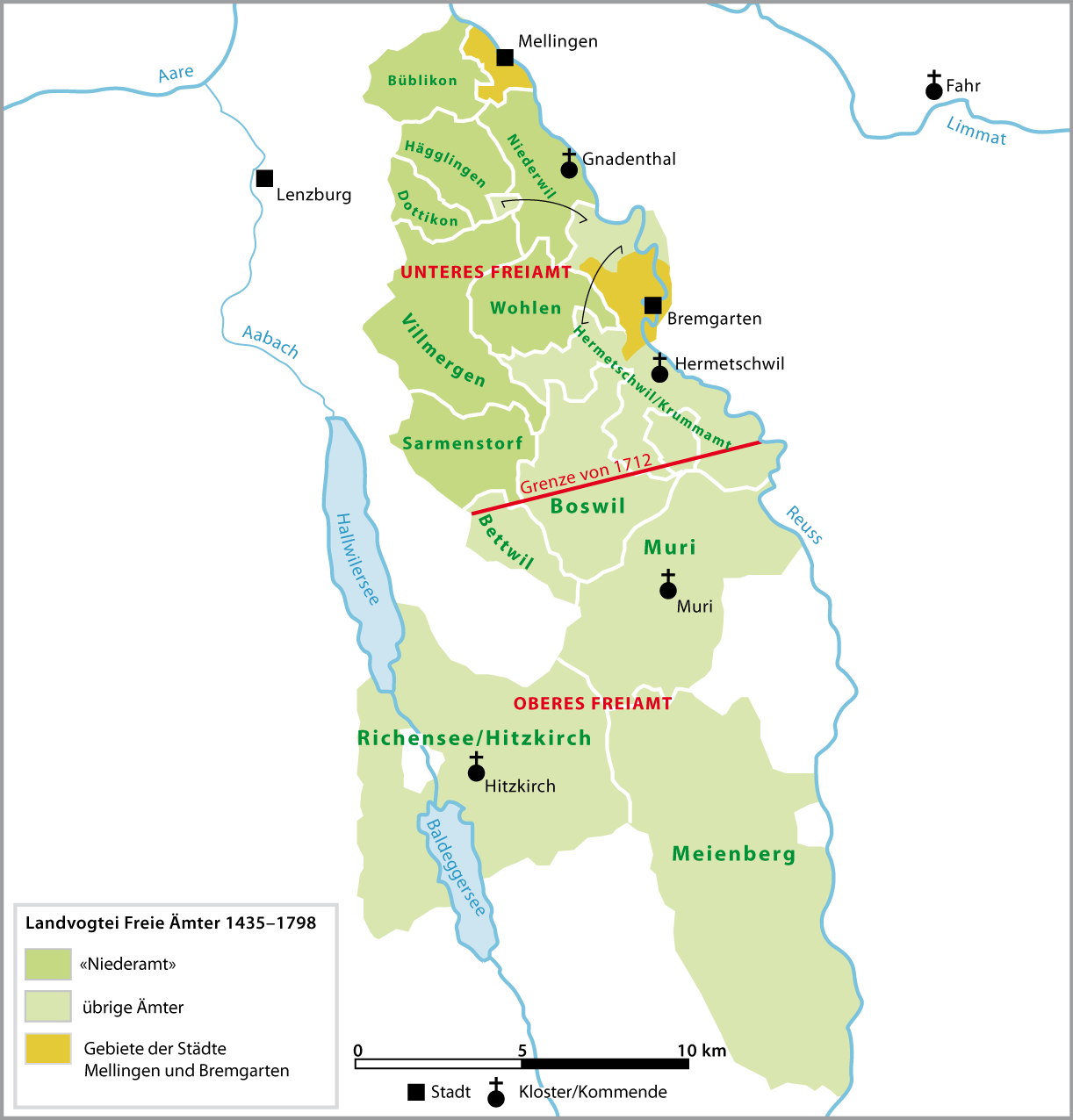
Map of the bailiwick of the Freie Ämter in the Old Swiss Confederacy 1435–1798

In 1415, Aargau was conquered by the Old Swiss Confederation. While Bern kept the southwest portion which consisted of Zofingen, Aarburg, Aarau, Lenzburg, and Brugg. Bremgarten became part of the Freie Ämter or free bailiwicks. They remained relatively independent and were allowed to keep their own legal districts. Bremgarten, together with the rest of the Freie Ämter (Mellingen, Muri, Villmergen, and the countship of Baden), were governed as "subject lands" by all or some of the Confederates. When Bremgarten refused the offer to join the Confederation freely, it became involved in the 1443 Old Zürich War, in which it was besieged and captured.

Bremgarten played an important role in the Reformation. An important Swiss reformer called Heinrich Bullinger was born there in 1504. As early as 1529, the official religion of the city changed from Catholicism. However, Catholicism was reintroduced by force in 1531 after the Battle of Kappel. Bullinger was forced into exile and moved to Zürich, where he became the successor of Huldrych Zwingli as the leader of the city after Zwingli had died in battle.

Aerial view by Walter Mittelholzer (1922)

Catholicism lost its influence after the second Villmerger War of 1712. Bremgarten became part of the area of Zürich, Bern and Glarus. During the French Revolution, it became for a short time host to Louis-Philippe, who sought refuge from the revolutionaries. Marshal André Masséna moved into Bremgarten, along with his headquarters, before his troops defeated those of Russia and Austria near Zürich. During the time of the Helvetic Republic, Bremgarten became part of the short-lived Canton of Baden. In 1803 it joined the canton of Aargau.

The city flourished during the Industrial Revolution. Because of the growth, the city wall was taken down, and it was connected to the Swiss railway system in 1876. Only since 1912 has the city been connected with Dietikon and Wohlen by rail.

Like everywhere in Europe, the era after World War II marked a vast increase in motorised traffic. Bremgarten is located at the main road connecting Lenzburg to Zürich. Before the highway was opened, it was one of the busiest roads in Switzerland. This was a big problem, because all the traffic needed to pass a small wooden bridge in the middle of the old part of the town. The opening of the highway did not solve this problem. Only in 1994, when a bypass was constructed, the old part of the town has finally been quiet again. It is now closed to motorised traffic.

== Geography ==
Bremgarten has an area, as of 2006, of 11.36 km^{2} (4.39 sq mi). Of this area, 10.1% is used for agricultural purposes, while 56% is forested. Of the rest of the land, 25.6% is settled (buildings or roads) and the remainder (8.4%) is non-productive (rivers or lakes).

The municipality is the capital of the Bremgarten district. The upper city is located on the heights above the Reuss river. While the lower city is located along the banks of the river.

== Coat of arms ==
The blazon of the municipal coat of arms is Argent a Lion rampant Gules.

== Demographics ==
Bremgarten has a population (as of 31 December 2020) of 8,415. As of 2008, 21.9% of the population was made up of foreign nationals. Over the last 10 years the population has grown at a rate of 17%. Most of the population (as of 2000) speaks German (86.2%), with Albanian being second most common (3.0%) and Italian being third (1.9%).

The age distribution, as of 2008, in Bremgarten is; 651 children or 10.4% of the population are between 0 and 9 years old and 692 teenagers or 11.1% are between 10 and 19. Of the adult population, 852 people or 13.6% of the population are between 20 and 29 years old. 909 people or 14.6% are between 30 and 39, 1,069 people or 17.1% are between 40 and 49, and 834 people or 13.4% are between 50 and 59. The senior population distribution is 648 people or 10.4% of the population are between 60 and 69 years old, 383 people or 6.1% are between 70 and 79, there are 180 people or 2.9% who are between 80 and 89, and there are 29 people or 0.5% who are 90 and older.

As of 2000, there were 358 homes with 1 or 2 persons in the household, 1,283 homes with 3 or 4 persons in the household, and 623 homes with 5 or more persons in the household. The average number of people per household was 2.12 individuals. In 2008 there were 549 single family homes (or 18.2% of the total) out of a total of 3,015 homes and apartments. There were a total of 115 empty apartments for a 3.8% vacancy rate. As of 2007, the construction rate of new housing units was 2.8 new units per 1000 residents.

In the 2007 federal election the most popular party was the SVP which received 31.8% of the vote. The next three most popular parties were the SP (21.1%), the CVP (16.3%) and the FDP (12.7%).

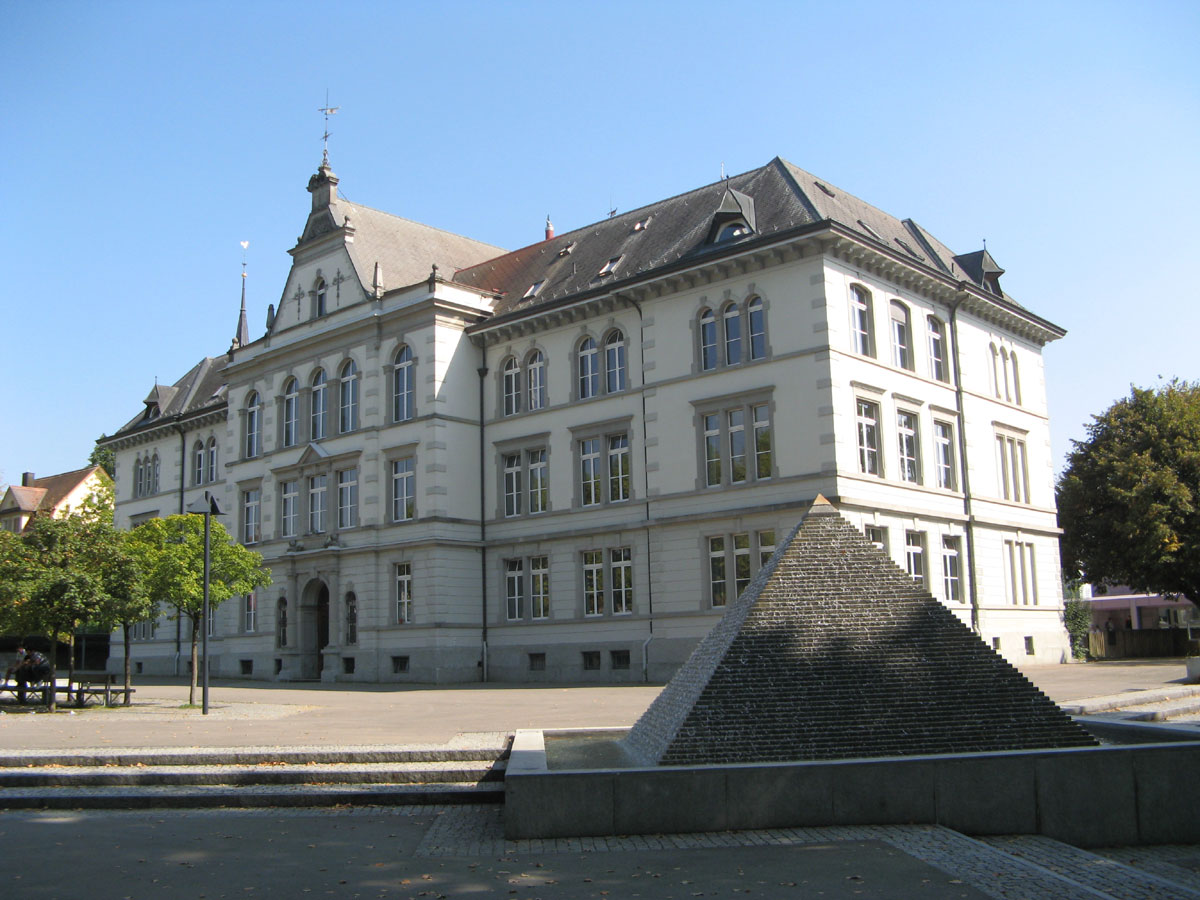
City School building

In Bremgarten about 69.1% of the population (between age 25-64) have completed either non-mandatory upper secondary education or additional higher education (either university or a Fachhochschule). Of the school age population (in the 2008/2009 school year), there are 475 students attending primary school, there are 186 students attending secondary school, there are 492 students attending tertiary or university level schooling in the municipality.

== Historic Population ==
The historical population is given in the following chart:

== Heritage sites of national significance ==
There are nine sites in Bremgarten that are listed as Swiss heritage sites of national significance. Before the 2014 merger with Hermetschwil-Staffeln, seven were in Bremgarten while two came from Hermetschwil-Staffeln. There are two government or administration buildings, the former Muri-Amthof at Antonigasse 2 as well as the addition to the Muri-Amthof at Antonigasse 4. Two churches are on the list, the Roman Catholic City Church with St. Klara Chapel, and the St. Anna Chapel together with the Mother of God Chapel (German: Muttergottes) on Pfarrgasse / Kirchgasse. Two fortifications are part of the inventory, the Schlössli at Schlossgässli 2 and the city walls. The final building on the list is the Weissenbach house at Antonigasse 24. The two from Hermetschwil-Staffeln were the Benedictine Convent of St. Martin, and the former Gasthaus (hotel-restaurant) at Dorfstrasse 9.

The entire village of Bremgarten is designated as part of the Inventory of Swiss Heritage Sites.

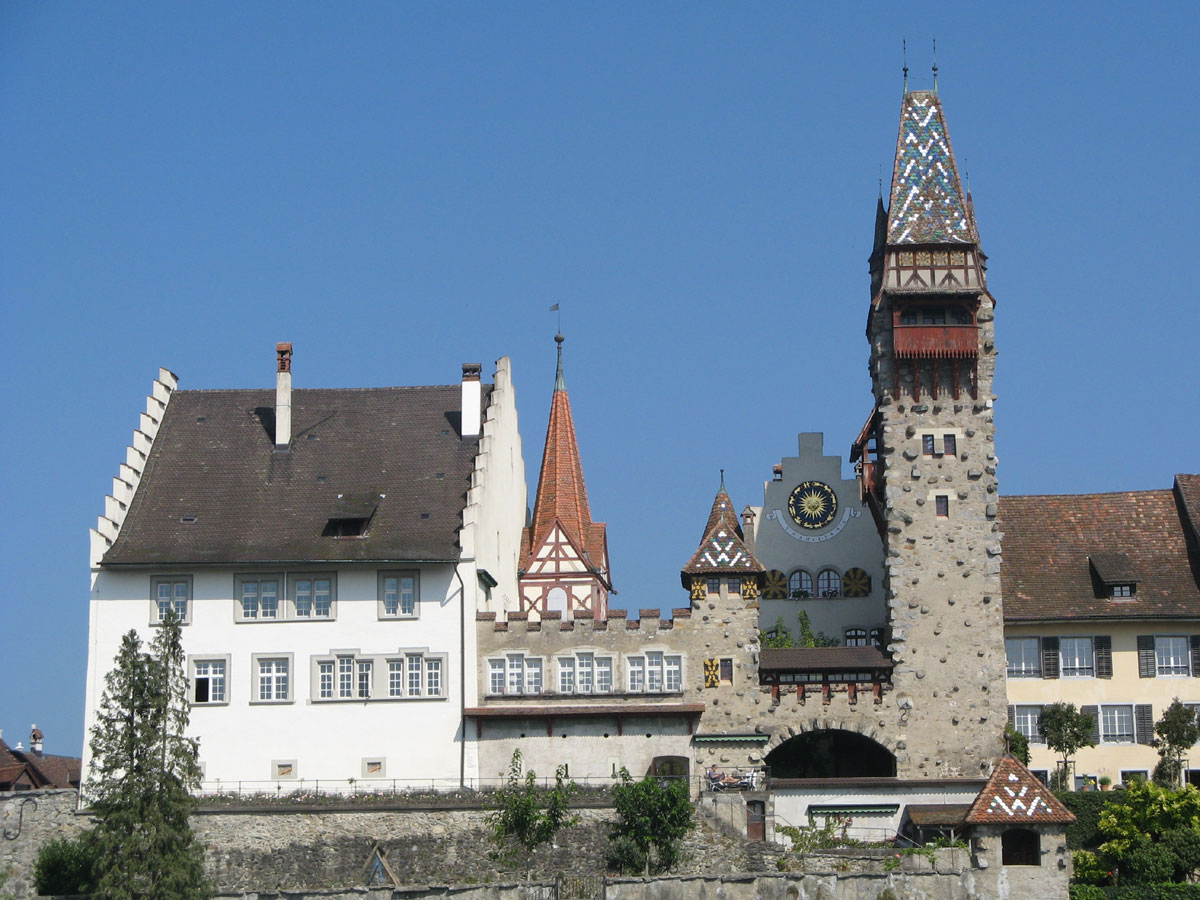
Muri-Amthof

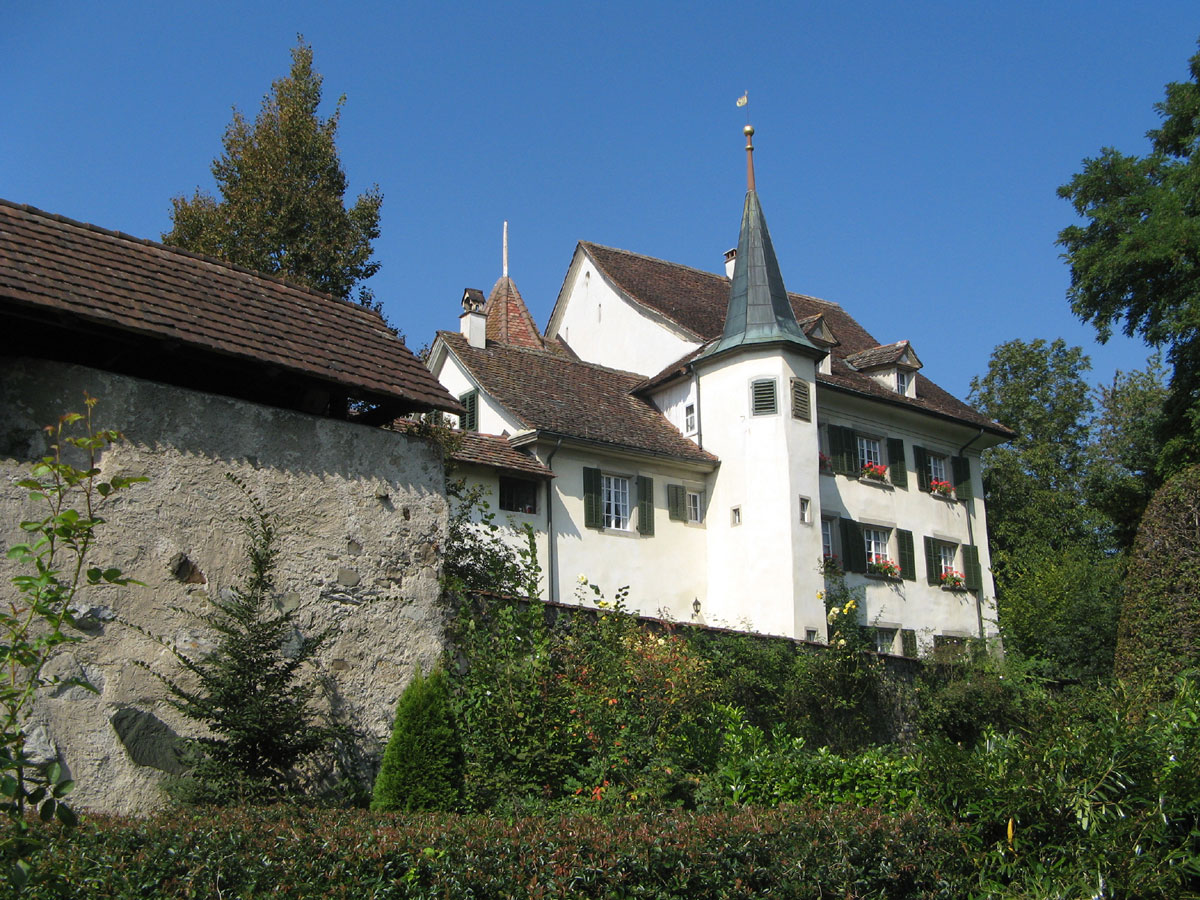
The Schlössli or little castle

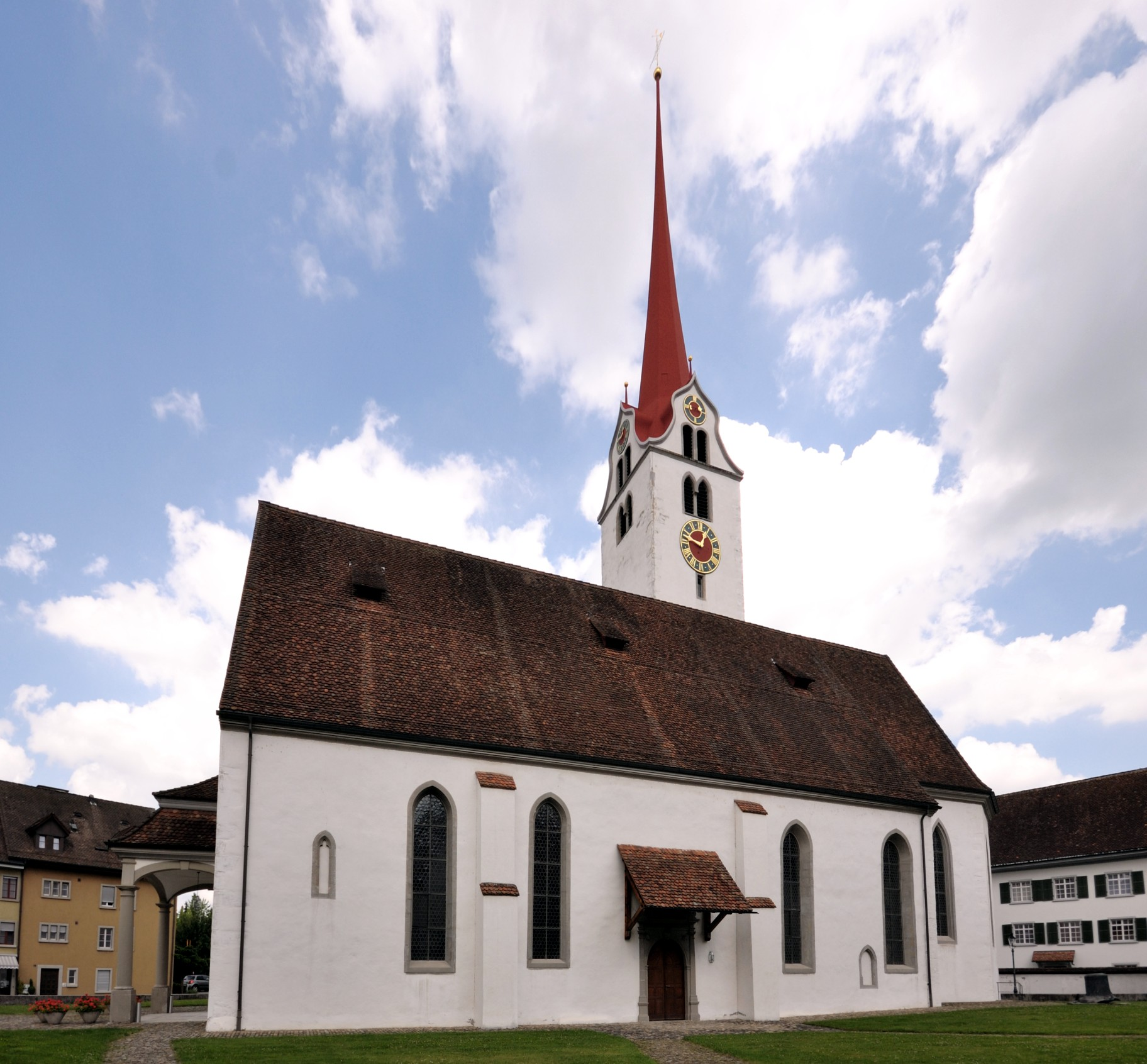
City Church

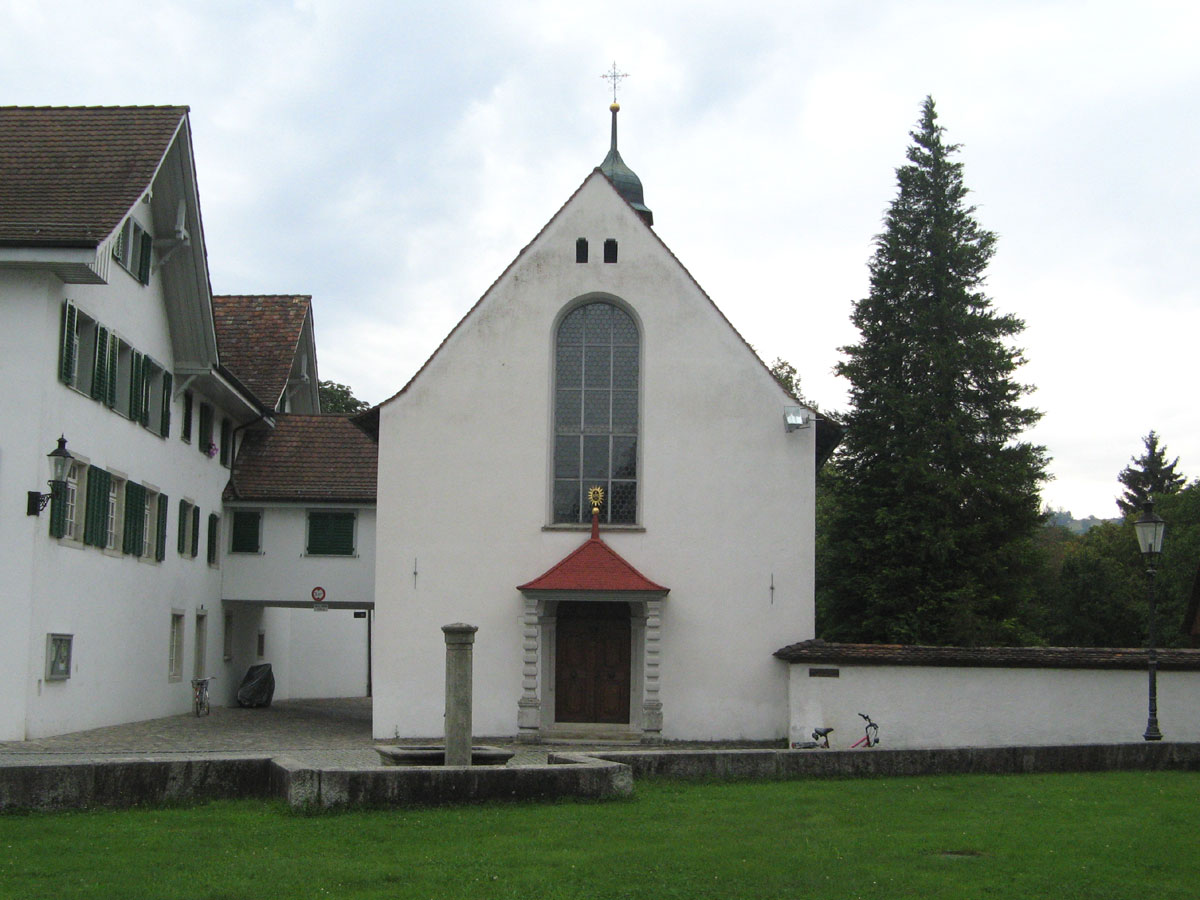
St. Klara Chapel

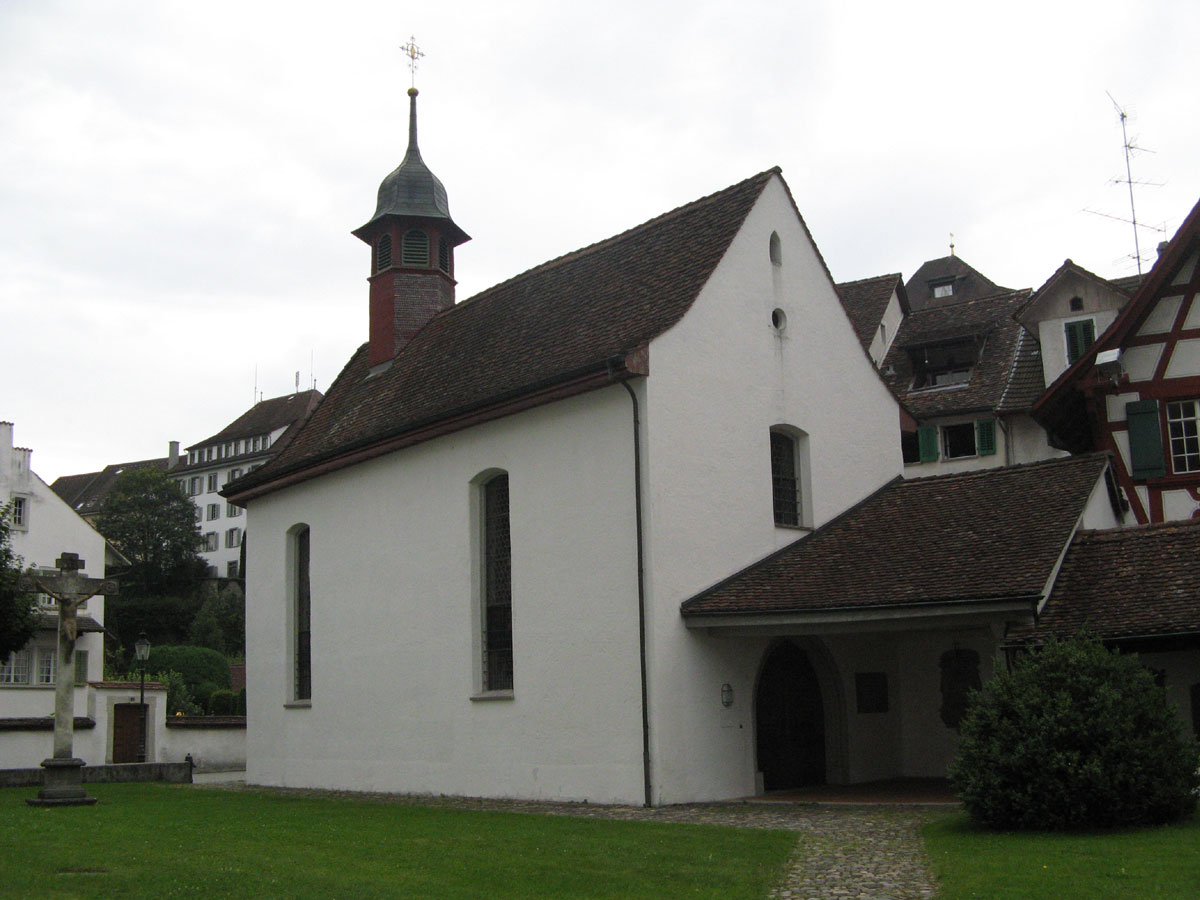
Mother of God Chapel (German: Muttergottes)

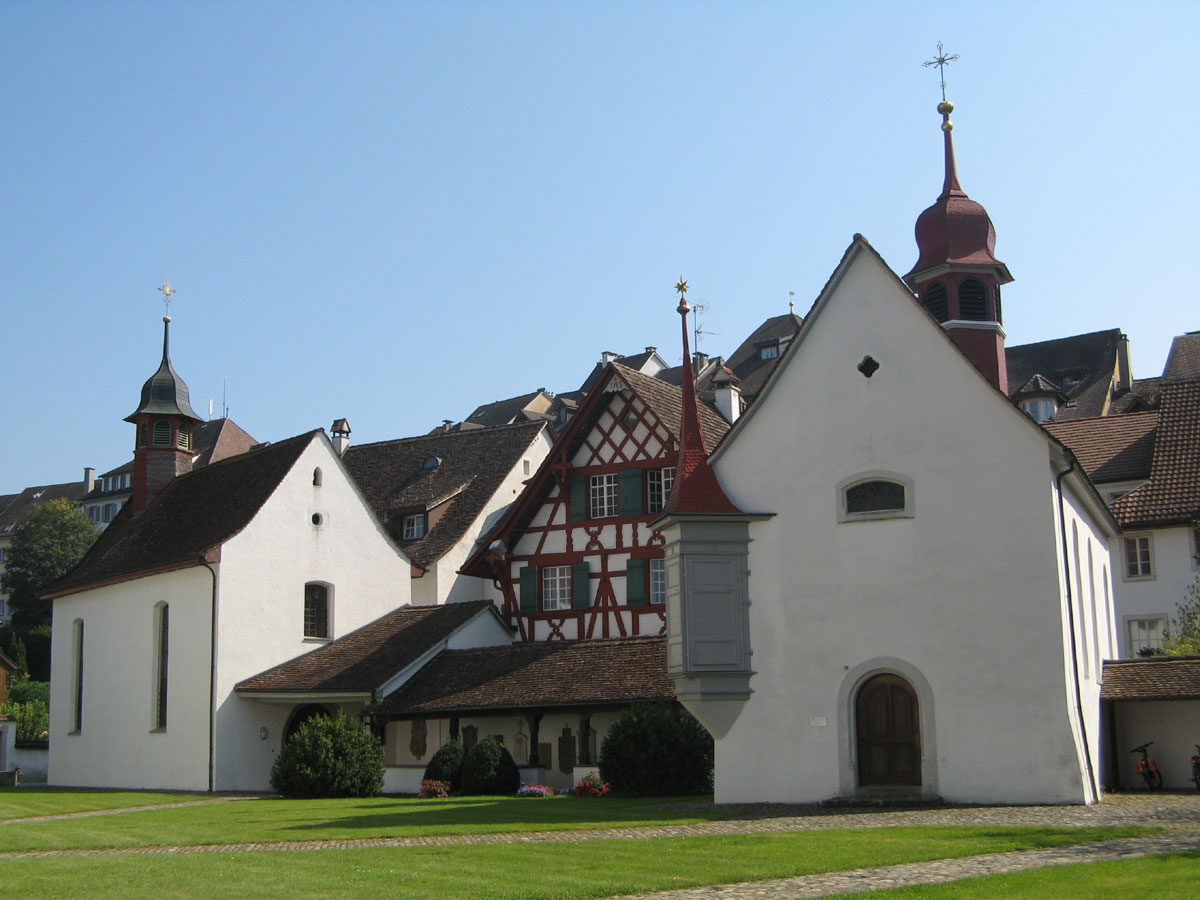
Mother of God Chapel, Organist house and St.Anna Chapel

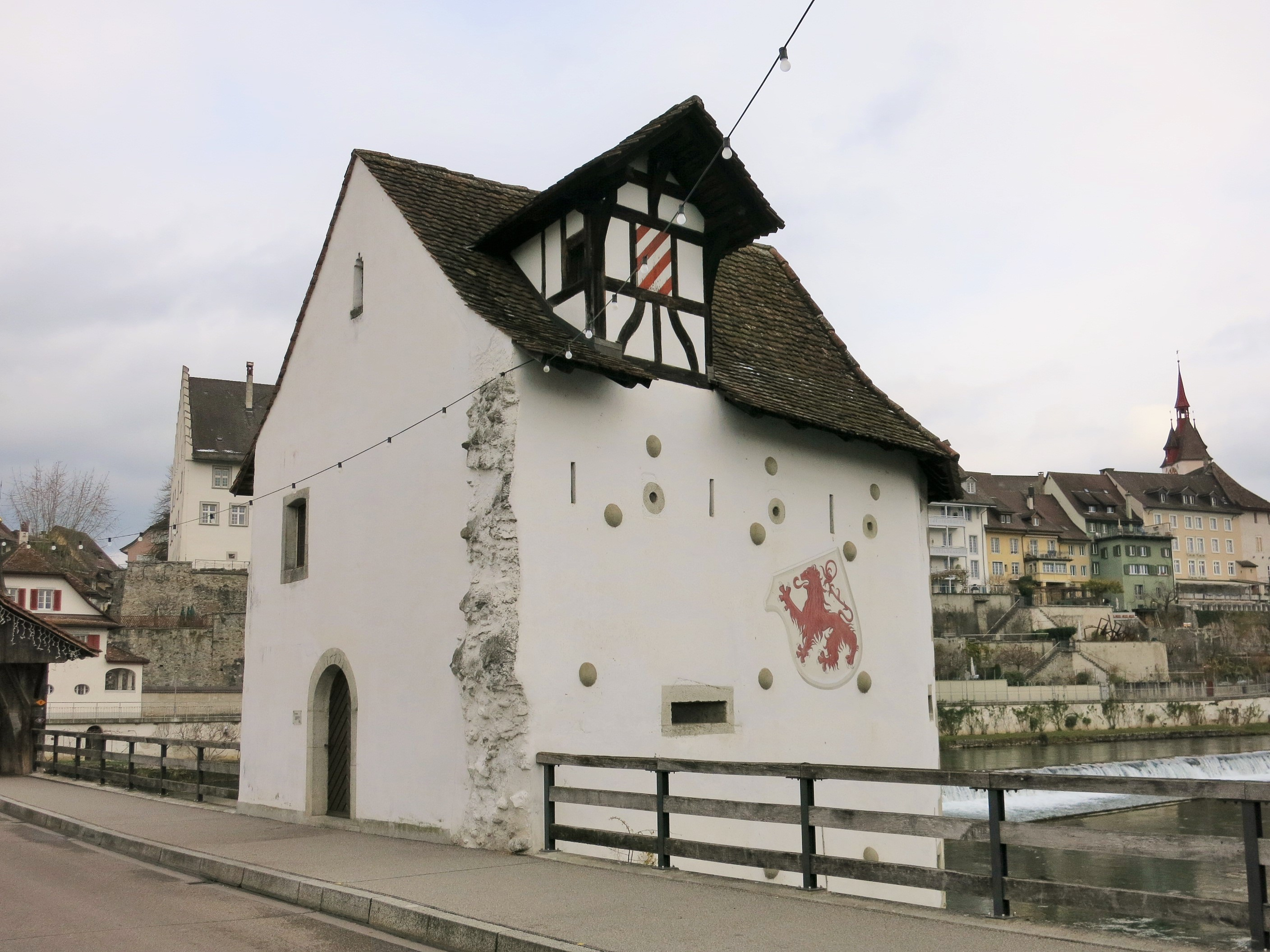
Bollhaus, part of city wall

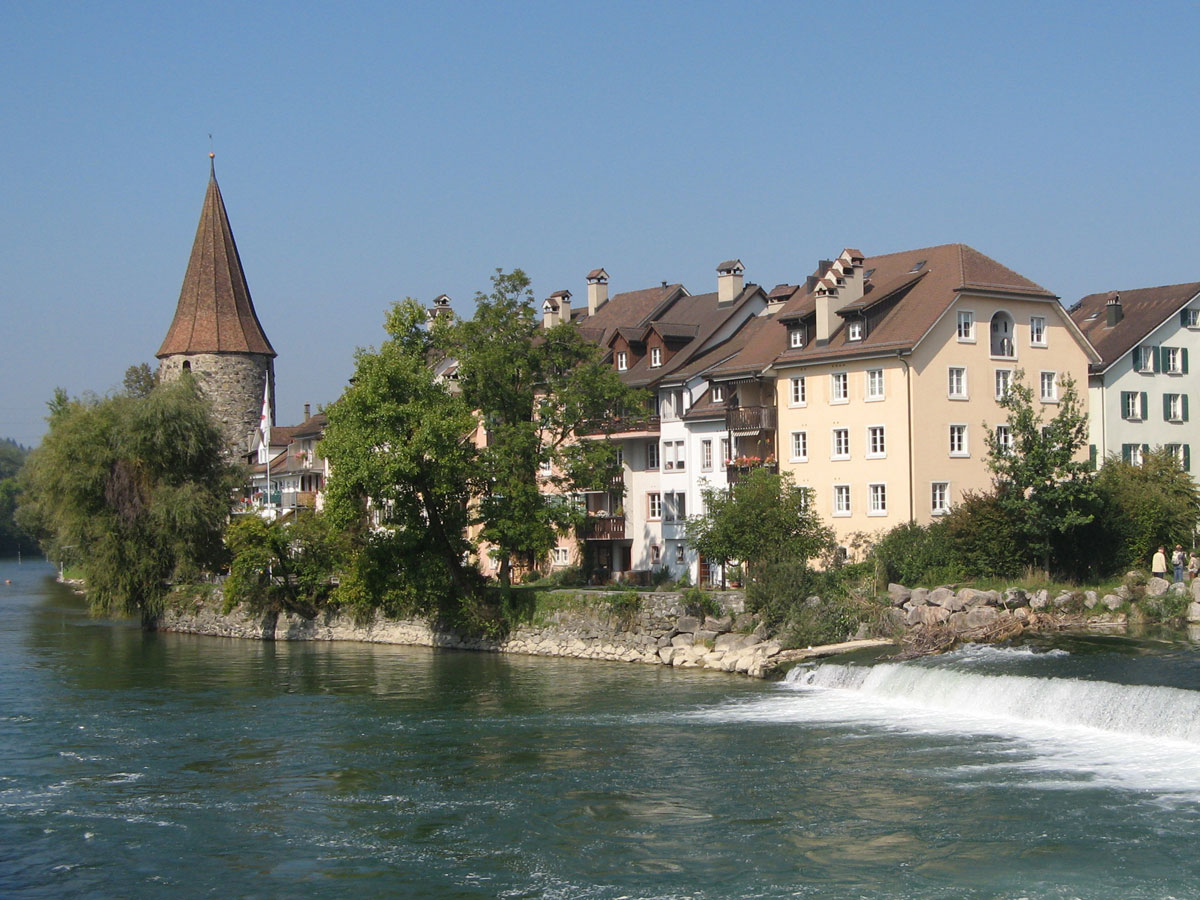
The Hexenturm or Witches Tower

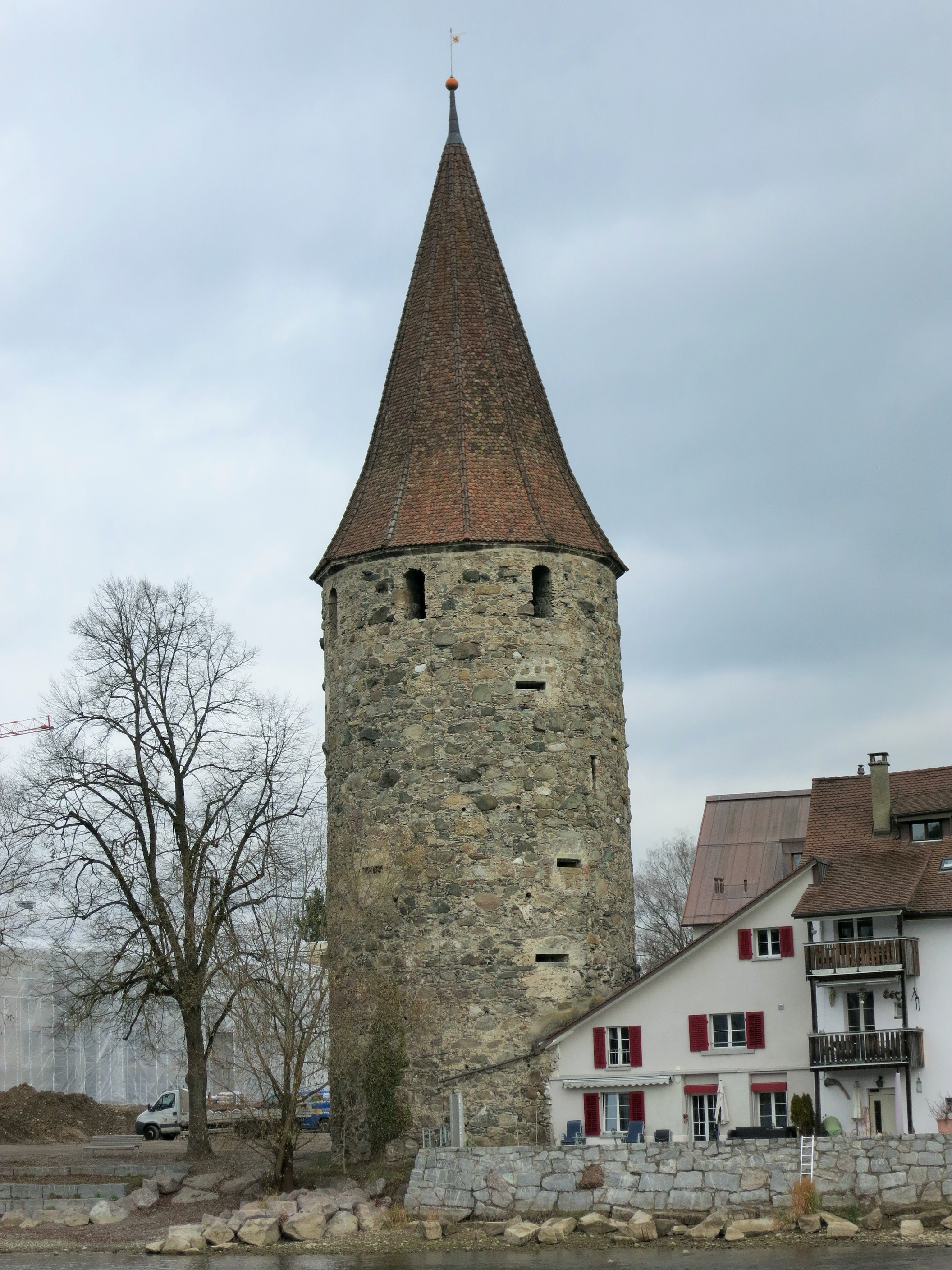
The Hexenturm

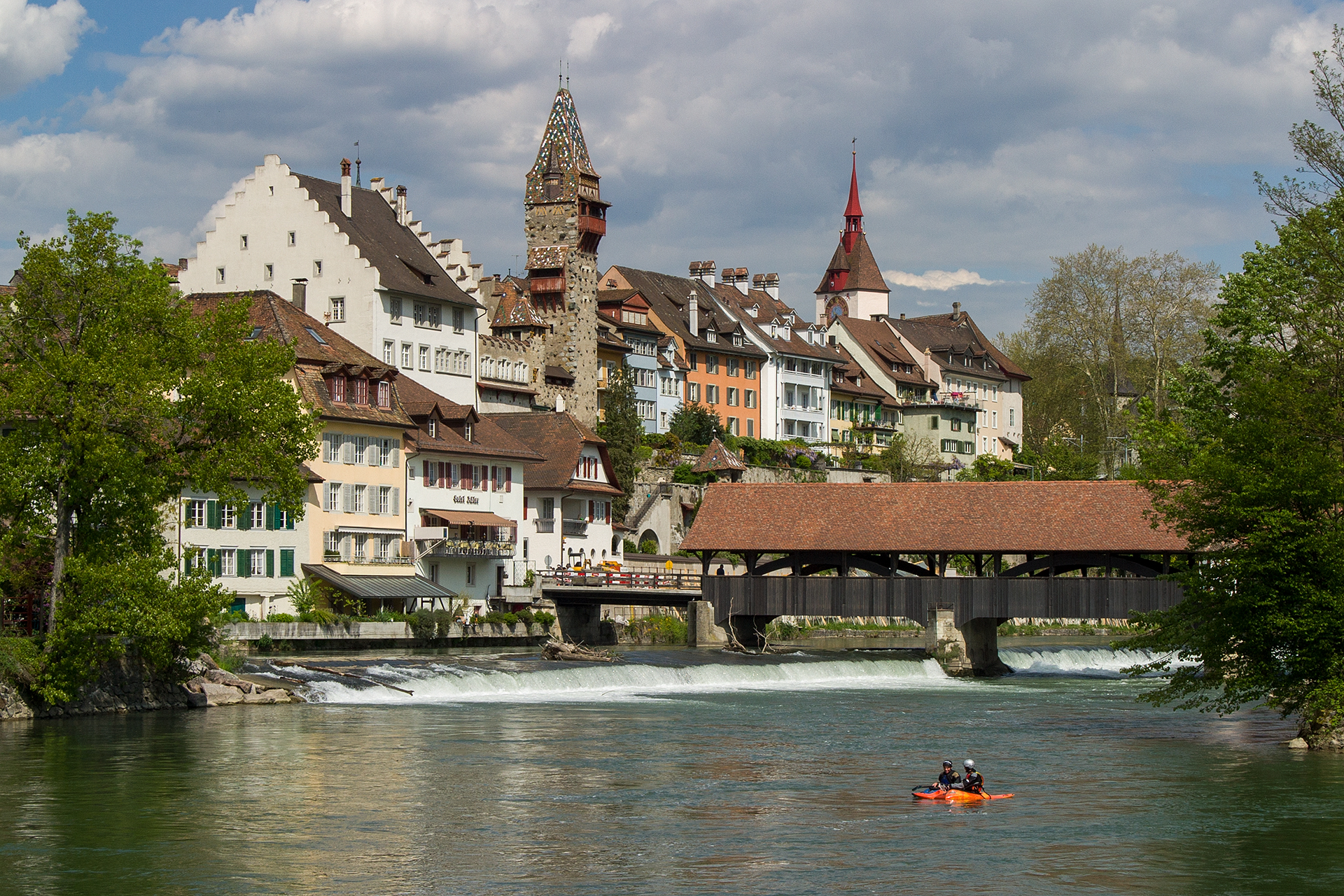
Reussbrucke or Reuss Bridge

== Economy ==
As of 2007, Bremgarten had an unemployment rate of 3.32%. As of 2005, there were 49 people employed in the primary economic sector and about 9 businesses involved in this sector. 876 people are employed in the secondary sector and there are 75 businesses in this sector. 2,345 people are employed in the tertiary sector, with 316 businesses in this sector.

As of 2000 there was a total of 2,921 workers who lived in the municipality. Of these, 1,978 or about 67.7% of the residents worked outside Bremgarten while 1,915 people commuted into the municipality for work. There were a total of 2,858 jobs (of at least 6 hours per week) in the municipality. Of the working population, 17.2% used public transportation to get to work, and 45% used a private car.

Bremgarten has a large variety of small and medium-sized businesses. Two large industrial companies based in the area are Georg Utz AG (Plastic technology) and Elro AG (Industrial kitchens), however some industrial businesses have been replaced by the service sector in recent years. The online grocer LeShop.ch has a large distribution center in Bremgarten.

== Transportation ==
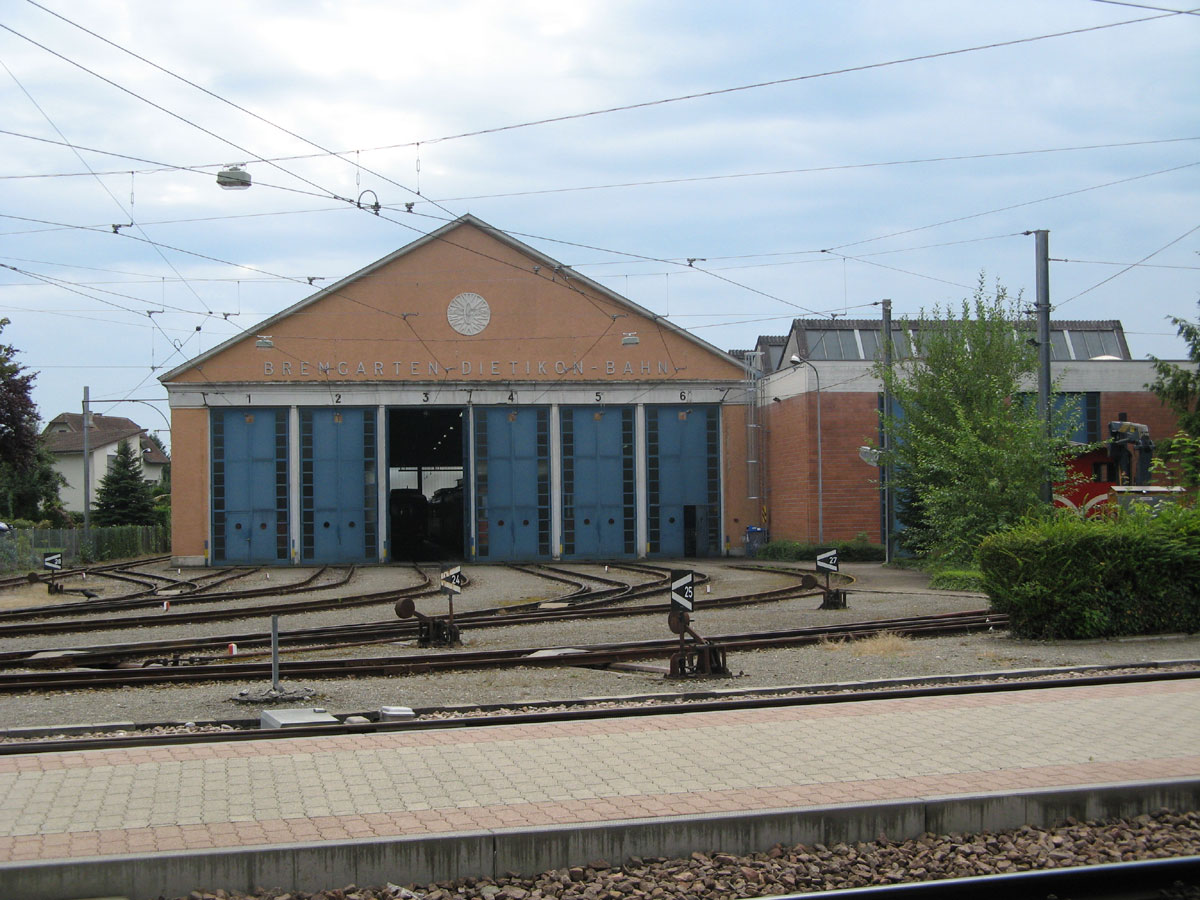
Depot of the Bremgarten-Dietikon-Bahn near the main train station

Bremgarten is located on the Bremgarten-Dietikon-Bahn railway, a metre gauge railway that links Dietikon and Wohlen. There are five stations within the town, and listed in order from the Dietikon end of the line these are Bibenlos-Sonnenhof, Bremgarten, Bremgarten Obertor, Bremgarten Isenlauf and Bremgarten West. Bremgarten station also hosts the administration and the depot of the company.

The line is served by route S17 of the S-Bahn Zürich, with a typical frequency of four trains per hour between Dietikon and Bremgarten West, of which two trains per hour continue to and from Wohlen. All trains stop at all stations, except in the morning, where two express trains only serve the most important stations.

== Religion ==
From the 2000 census, 2,720 or 51.0% were Roman Catholic, while 1,146 or 21.5% belonged to the Swiss Reformed Church. Of the rest of the population, there were 12 individuals (or about 0.22% of the population) who belonged to the Christian Catholic faith.

== Culture ==
=== Markets ===
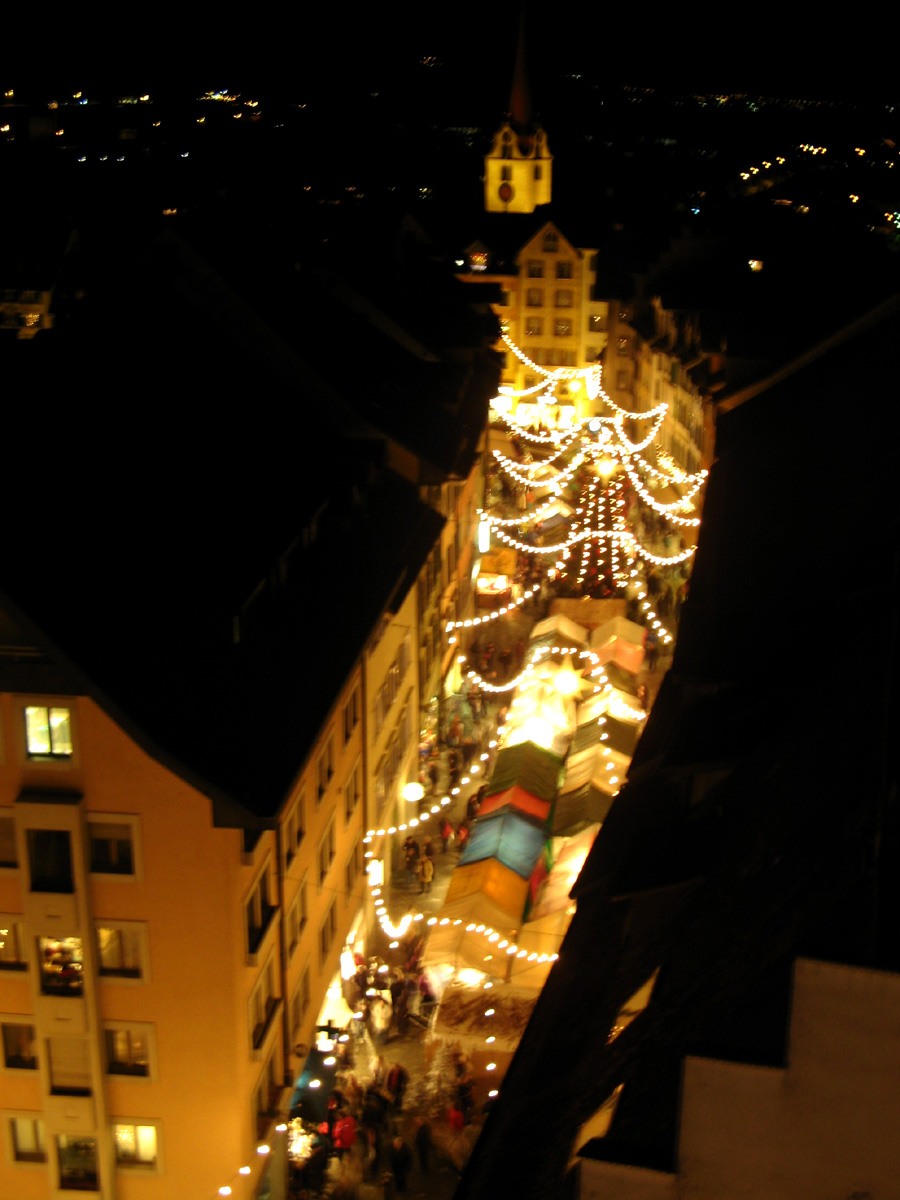
Christchindlimärt 2007 (View from the Spittelturm)

Bremgarten is famous for its four large markets, which attract tens of thousands of visitors and are important for tourism. The Easter Market on Easter Monday (including an agricultural machinery market) and the Whitsun Market on Whit Monday have a tradition of more than 750 years. The Old Town Market is held over two days at the end of October and focuses on arts and crafts. Since 1995, the Christchindlimärt has been held over four days in early December. With over 100,000 visitors and more than 300 stalls, it is now the largest Christmas market in Switzerland and has gained international renown. There are also weekly markets every Wednesday and Saturday from March to November.

=== Alternative culture ===
In June 1990, young people occupied a textile factory that had been abandoned for 16 years. The following year, the Verein KulturZentrum Bremgarten KuZeB was founded with the aim of creating a small version of the Wohlgroth in Zurich. Since 1992 the association has held a tenancy agreement with the owner of the factory building. KuZeB's cultural programme ranges from concerts of alternative and subculture of international format to readings and political lectures. In parts of the population, the appearance of the building has led to rejection.

== Notable people ==
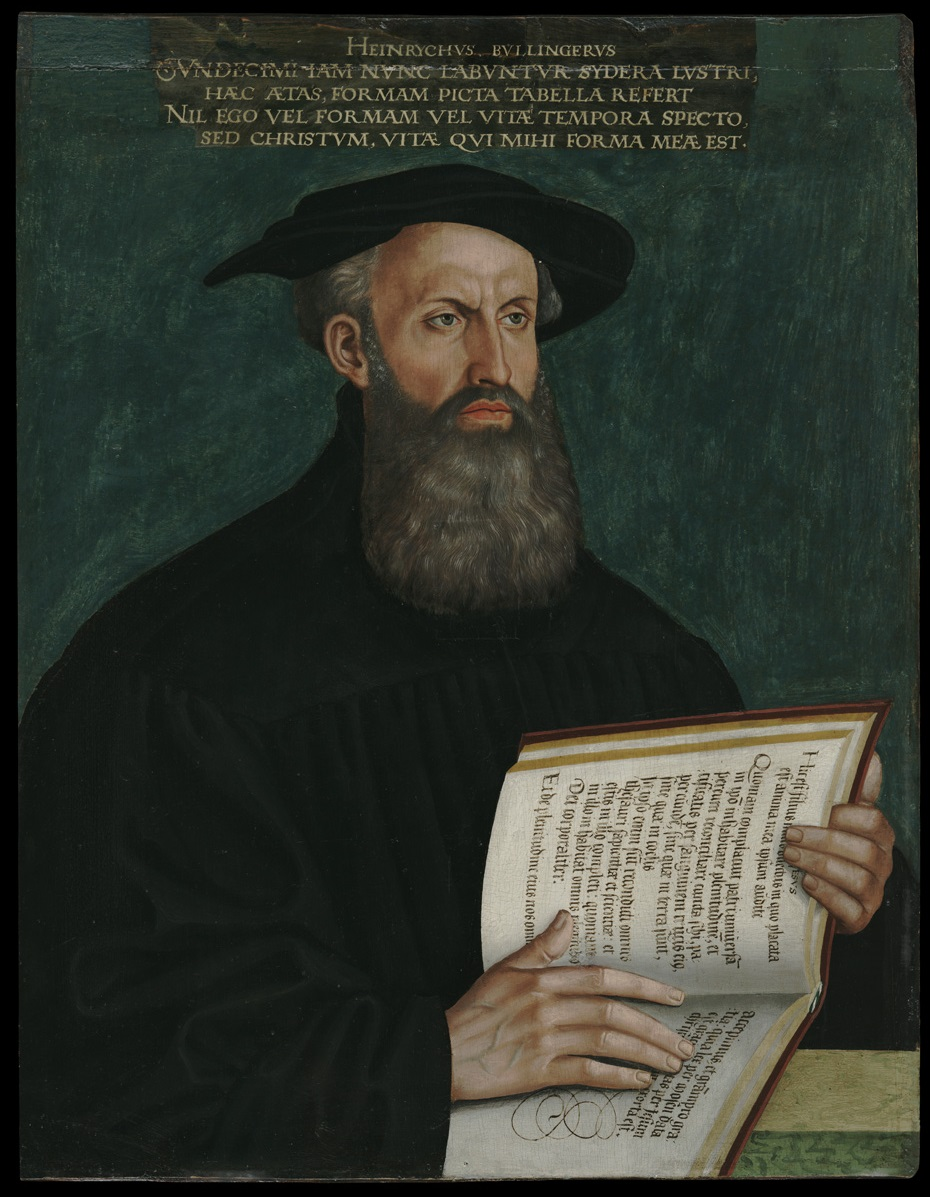
Heinrich Bullinger, 1550

- Werner Schodoler (1490-1541) a Swiss chronicler, author of Swiss History, the earliest of the Swiss illustrated chronicles
- Johannes Aal (ca.1500–1553) a Swiss Roman Catholic theologian, composer and dramaturg
- Heinrich Bullinger (1504–1575) a Swiss reformer, an influential theologian of the Protestant Reformation
- Johann Melchior Gletle (1626–1683) a Swiss organist, Kapellmeister and composer
- J.M. Brunswick (1819-1886) a Swiss Jewish immigrant to the U.S. who founded the J.M. Brunswick Manufacturing Company
- Hans Hutmacher (1921–1956) a Swiss racing cyclist, he rode in the 1949 Tour de France
- Cesar Lüthi (1930–2002) a Swiss international sports marketing businessman
- Stephan Joho (born 1963) a Swiss former professional cyclist, competed at the 1984 Summer Olympics
