= Horgenglarus =

Swiss manufacturing company

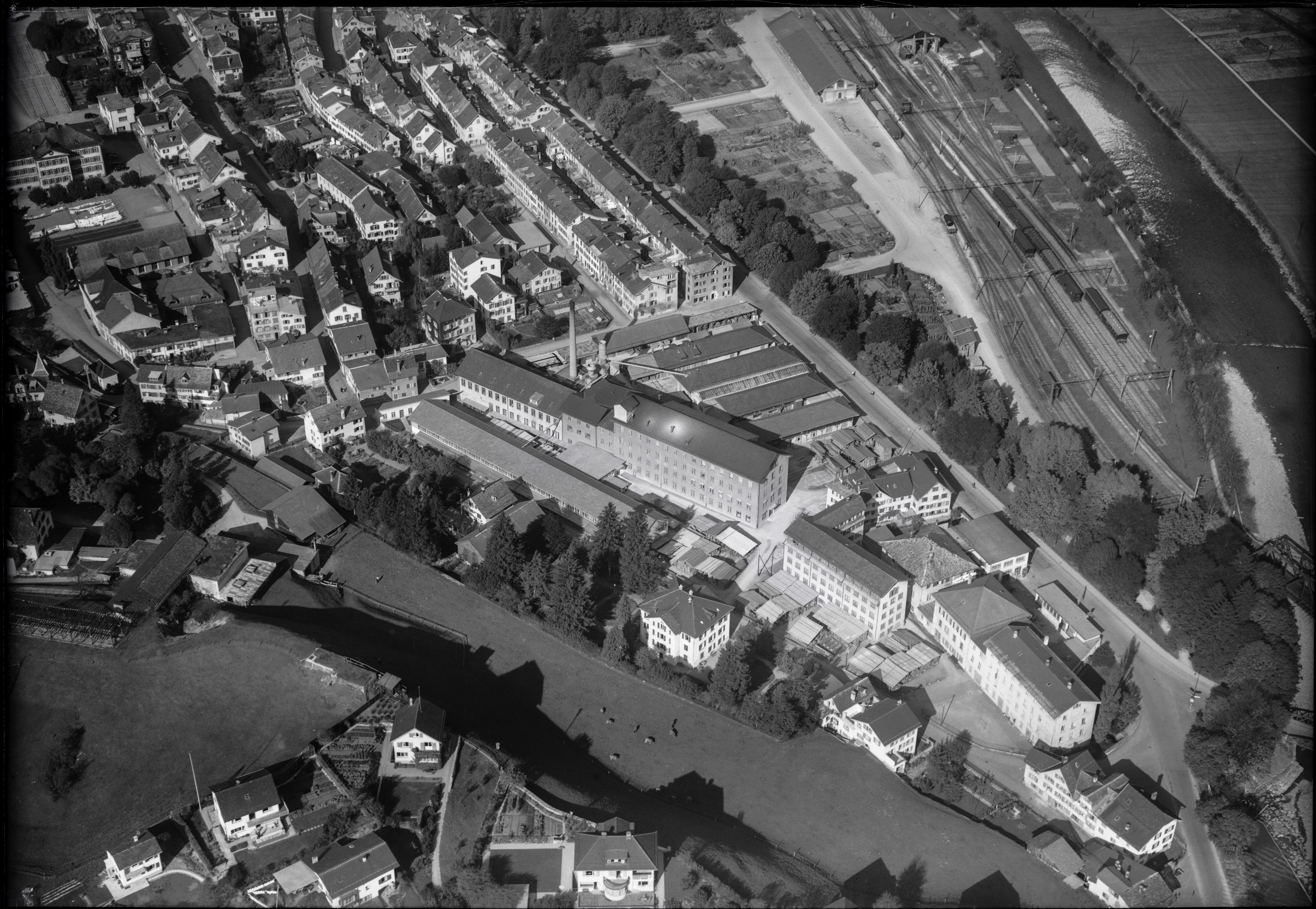
- horgenglarus' headquarters in 1948
- Native name: ag möbelfabrik horgenglarus
- Founded: 1880; 146 years ago in Horgen, Switzerland
- Founder: Emil Baumann
- Headquarters: Glarus, Switzerland
- Key people: Markus v. Nordeck (President); Josef Kaiser (CEO)
- Number of employees: 50 (2026)
- Parent: v. Nordeck International Holding AG
- Website: horgenglarus.ch

Horgenglarus (stylized horgenglarus) is a Swiss furniture manufacturing company based in Glarus, Switzerland. Founded in 1880, the company is the oldest chair and table manufacture in Switzerland. The company was founded in Horgen on Lake Zurich and relocated to Glarus in 1902, hence the name.

In the past several prominent architects have designed for the company such as Max Ernst Haefeli, Werner Max Moser, Max Bill and Trix & Robert Haussmann. Several products of the company ever since advanced to being Swiss design classics. In 2011, the company was sold to the von Nordeck family.
