= Bellikon =

- Municipality
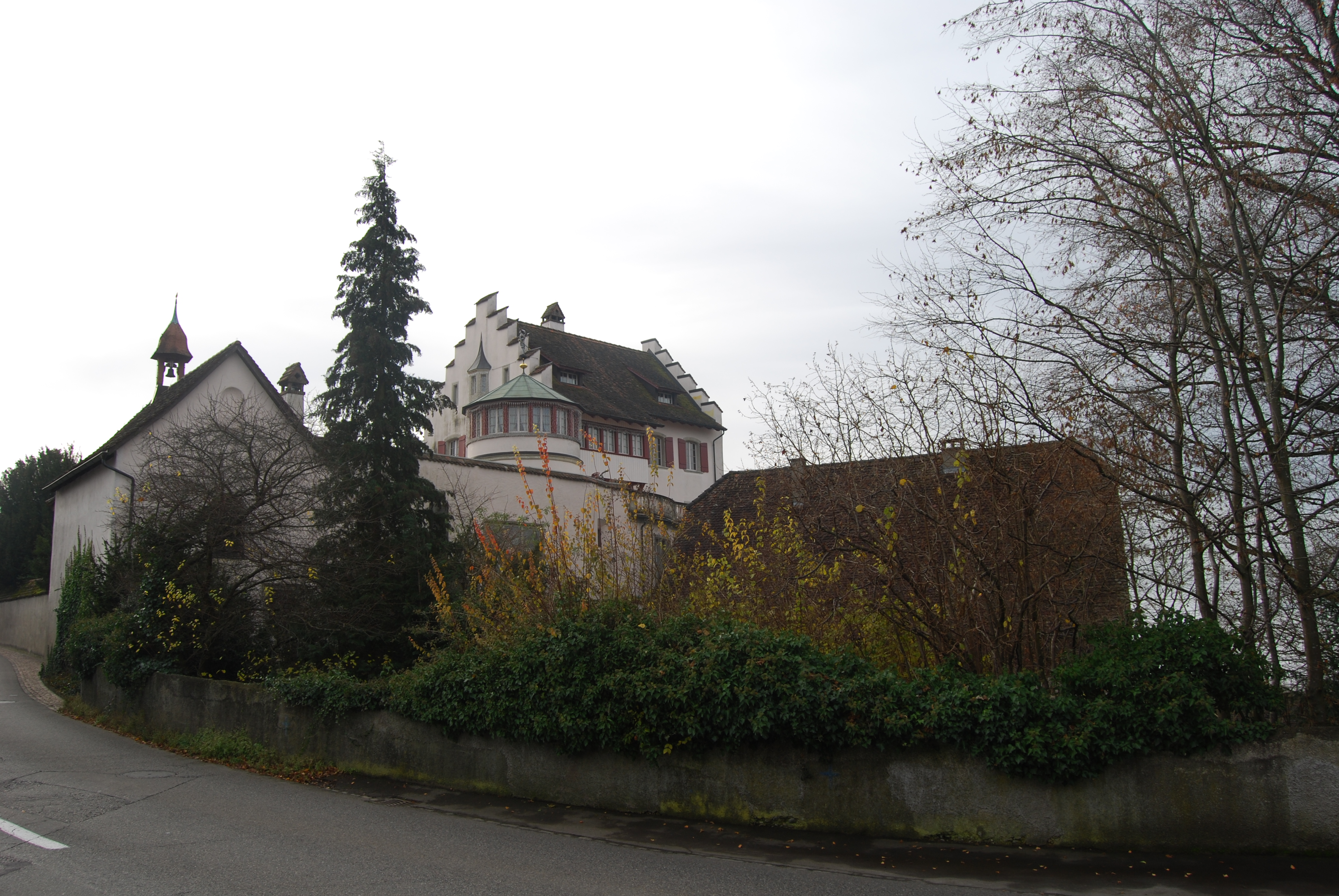

- Flag Coat of arms
- Location of Bellikon
- Location within Switzerland Location within Canton of Aargau
- Coordinates: 47°23′N 8°21′E
- Country: Switzerland
- Canton: Aargau
- District: Baden

Area
  - Total: 4.94 km^{2} (1.91 sq mi)
- Elevation: 597 m (1,959 ft)

Population (December 2020)
  - Total: 1,544
  - Density: 313/km^{2} (810/sq mi)
- Time zone: UTC+01:00 (CET)
  - Summer (DST): UTC+02:00 (CEST)
- Postal code: 5454
- SFOS number: 4022
- ISO 3166 code: CH-AG
- Surrounded by: Bergdietikon, Eggenwil, Künten, Remetschwil, Spreitenbach, Widen
- Website: www.bellikon.ch

Bellikon is a municipality in the district of Baden in the canton of Aargau in Switzerland.

Aerial view (1952)

== History ==
The area was settled during Roman times. The Roman road between Vindonissa (Windisch) and Turicum (Zürich) ran through here. In 1934, bricks were found which on examination proved to belong to a villa, which was excavated and documented in 1941, and afterwards covered up again with the help of interned Polish soldiers. Articles found on the site indicate a construction date at the end of the 1st century. In the middle of the 6th century, the Alamanni settled here and cleared the forest, destroying the Roman settlement.

Bellikon was first documented on October 11, 1064, in the foundation charter of Muri Abbey, though it was first individually mentioned in the 12th century as Pellikon. Bellikon and Hausen at first paid tithes to Murbach Abbey in Alsace, but was later part of the Habsburg territories. In 1415, the Aargau was conquered and thereafter Bellikon belonged to the village of Rohrdorf in the County of Baden. In 1798, Bellikon became part of the Canton of Baden in the Helvetic Republic. Bellikon was merged with Hausen in 1803 and became part of Aargau Canton.

At the beginning of the 20th century Bellikon was a farming village with a population of 377; fifty years later it reached 434. In the early 21st century, the number of inhabitants rose to over 1,400.

In 1974, the SUVA insurance agency and healthcare provider opened its premises here. In the same year, a new school was built. The 19th century church was replaced by a modern building in 1977.

== Geography ==
Bellikon has an area, as of 2006, of 5 km^{2} (1.9 sq mi). Of this area, 61.4% is used for agricultural purposes, while 29.3% is forested. The rest of the land, (9.3%) is settled.

It is located on the southwest slope of the Heitersberg, separated by the Reuss River and Limmat Valley. It consists of the villages of Bellikon and Hausen.

== Demographics ==
Bellikon has a population (as of 31 December 2020) of 1,544. As of 2008, 11.4% of the population was made up of foreign nationals. Over the last 10 years the population has grown at a rate of 17.5%. Most of the population (as of 2000) speaks German (94.3%), with Serbo-Croatian being second most common ( 1.1%) and Italian being third ( 0.8%).

The age distribution, as of 2008, in Bellikon is; 153 children or 10.1% of the population are between 0 and 9 years old and 168 teenagers or 11.1% are between 10 and 19. Of the adult population, 150 people or 9.9% of the population are between 20 and 29 years old. 184 people or 12.2% are between 30 and 39, 332 people or 21.9% are between 40 and 49, and 248 people or 16.4% are between 50 and 59. The senior population distribution is 176 people or 11.6% of the population are between 60 and 69 years old, 77 people or 5.1% are between 70 and 79, there are 21 people or 1.4% who are between 80 and 89, and there are 4 people or 0.3% who are 90 and older.

As of 2000, there were 59 homes with 1 or 2 persons in the household, 216 homes with 3 or 4 persons in the household, and 238 homes with 5 or more persons in the household. The average number of people per household was 2.43 individuals. In 2008 there were 328 single family homes (or 44.3% of the total) out of a total of 741 homes and apartments.

In the 2007 federal election the most popular party was the SVP which received 42.9% of the vote. The next three most popular parties were the CVP (15.4%), the FDP (12.9%) and the SP (10.8%).

The entire Swiss population is generally well educated. In Bellikon about 87.8% of the population (between age 25 and 64) have completed either non-mandatory upper secondary education or additional higher education (either university or a Fachhochschule). Of the school age population (in the 2008/2009 school year), there are 120 students attending primary school in the municipality.

The historical population is given in the following table:

Historical population
Year	Pop.	±%
1850	440	—
1900	377	−14.3%
1950	434	+15.1%
2000	1,303	+200.2%
2003	1,436	+10.2%

== Religion ==
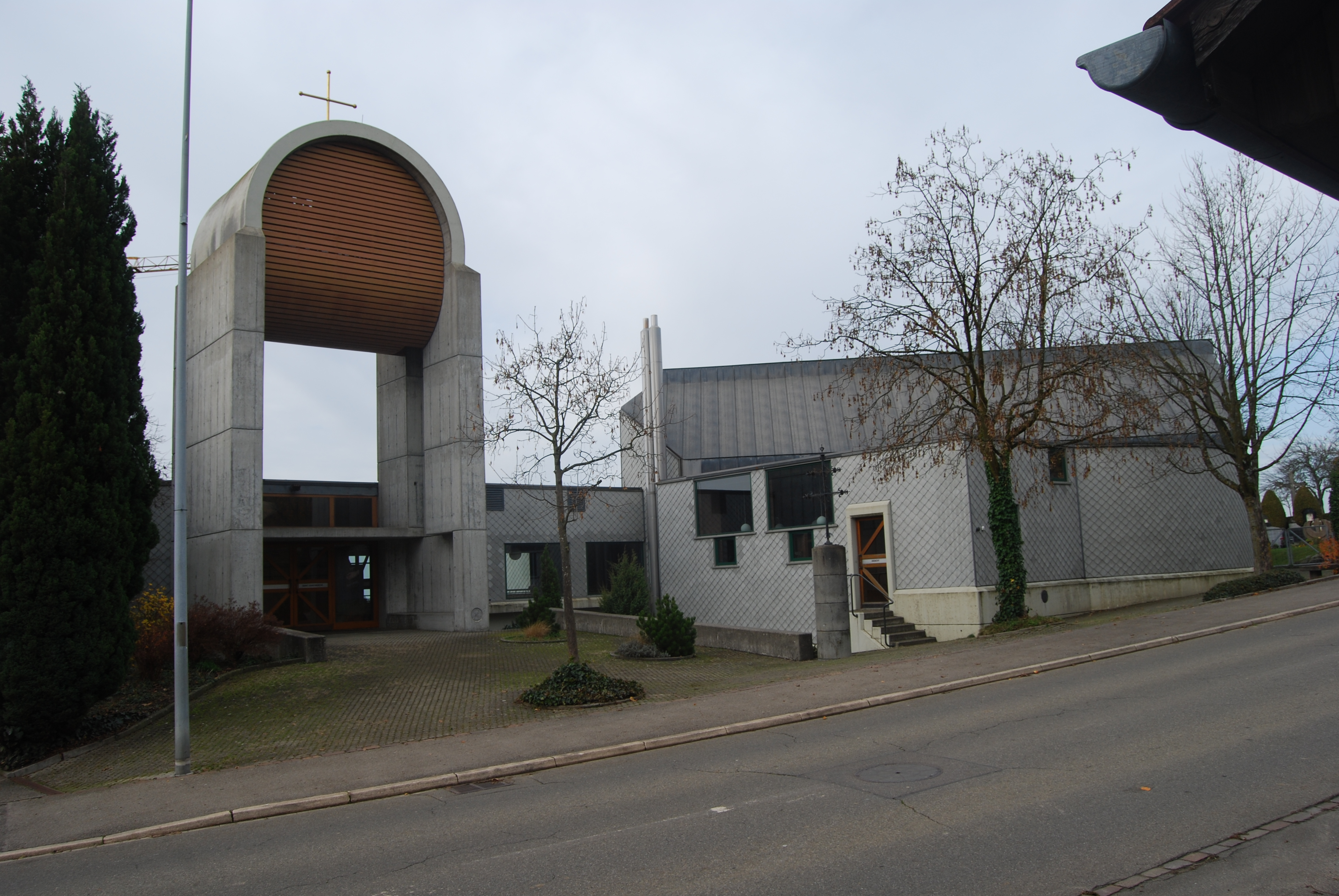
Church in Bellikon

From the 2000 census, 642 or 49.3% are Roman Catholic, while 380 or 29.2% belonged to the Swiss Reformed Church. Of the rest of the population, there is 1 individual who belongs to the Christian Catholic faith.

== Coat of arms ==
The arms are emblazoned: Azure, a castle with a stepped gable and to the sinister a round tower with a roof, all argent. In a chronicle of 1548 and the map of the Canton of Zürich of 1667, the village is mistakenly assigned the arms of the lords of Bellikon (now Bad Bellingen in the Breisgau) (Or, a fess sable). Since 1827 the community has used arms depicting Schloss Bellikon. The present form was established in 1965.

== Sites of interest ==
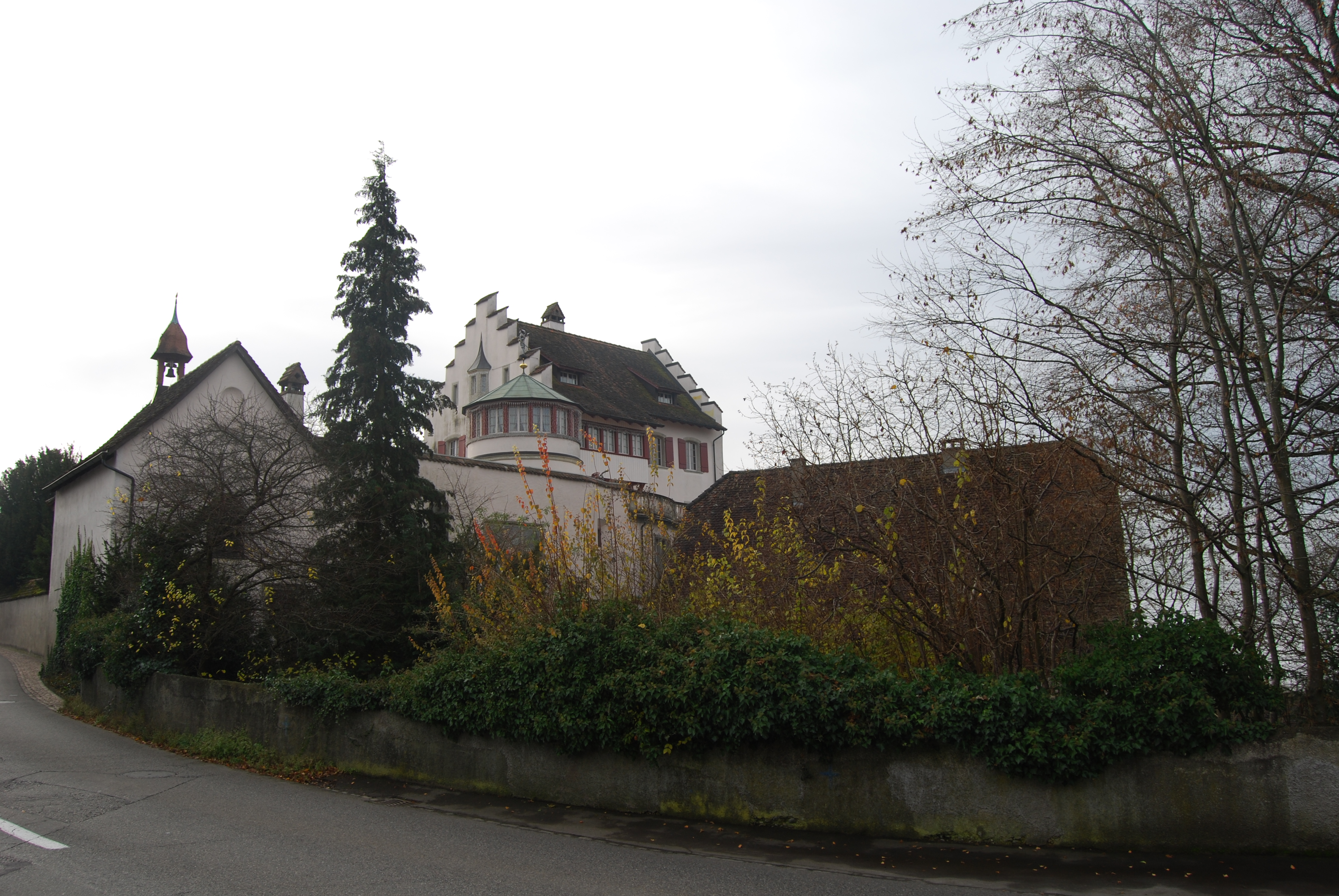
Bellikon Castle

- Schloss Bellikon (Bellikon Castle), which features in the municipal coat of arms, is a small castle that was built in the 13th century by the Habsburgs and was known as Rotten Hus. From 1314 to 1640, the patrician Krieg family of Zürich owned the castle. It was later auctioned twice, most recently at the end of September 1999.

== Administration ==
The community meeting of the enfranchised voters exercises legislative power. The implementing authority is the local council. The term of office is four years. It leads and represents the municipality. In addition it carries out the resolutions of the municipality meeting and the tasks assigned by the canton and the Swiss Federation.

== Economy ==
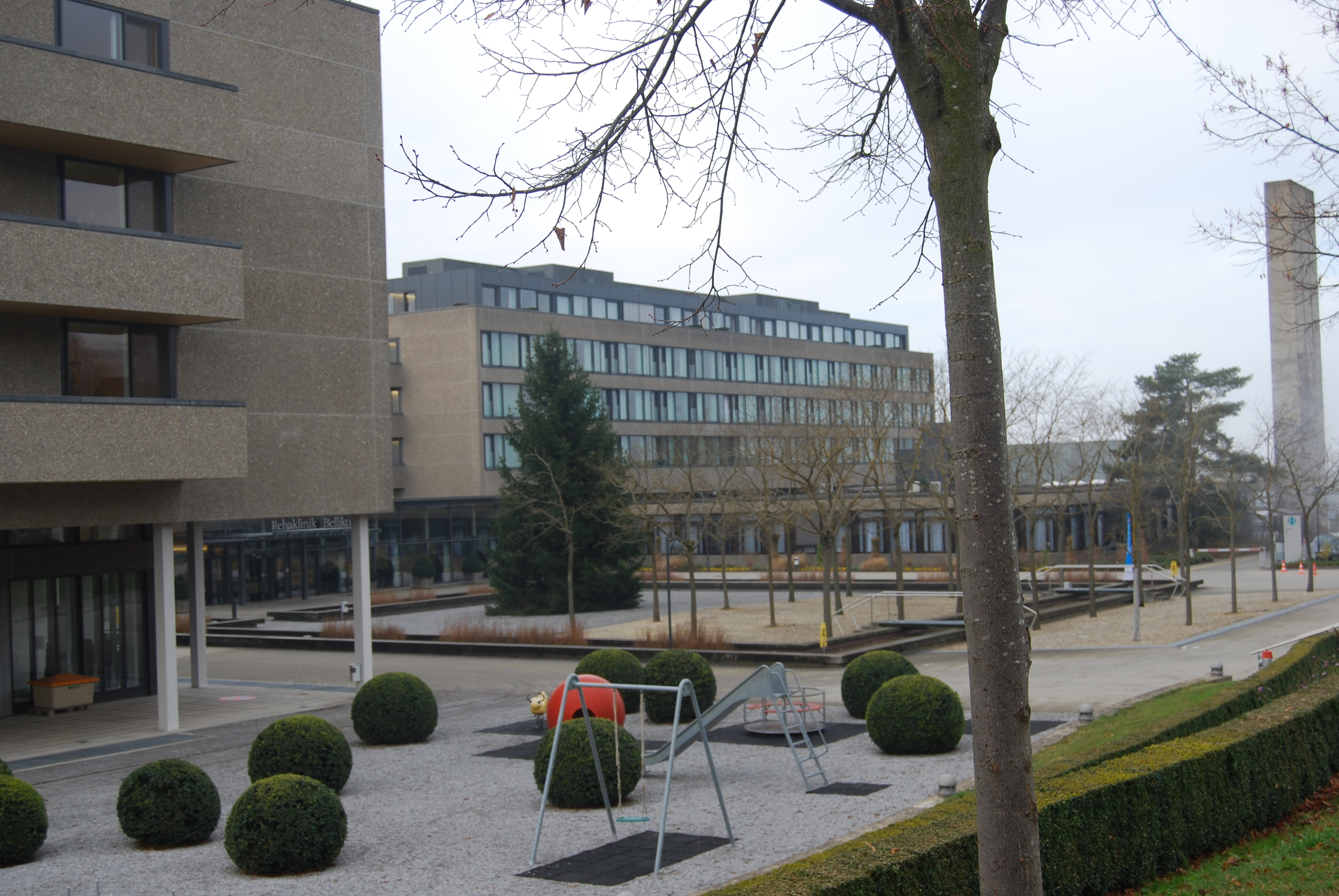
The Suva clinic

The largest business (and taxpayer) in the village is the Suva, which is a rehab clinic operating with over 200 beds. There are not many businesses, and the majority are small. Many of the residents are employed in the agglomerations of Baden and Zürich.

As of 2007, Bellikon had an unemployment rate of 1.49%. As of 2005, there were 37 people employed in the primary economic sector and about 13 businesses involved in this sector. 23 people are employed in the secondary sector and there are 9 businesses in this sector. 496 people are employed in the tertiary sector, with 34 businesses in this sector.

As of 2000 there were 769 total workers who lived in the municipality. Of these, 589 or about 76.6% of the residents worked outside Bellikon while 321 people commuted into the municipality for work. There were a total of 501 jobs (of at least 6 hours per week) in the municipality.

Bellikon has a rehab hospital which has over 200 beds. It has a kindergarten and a primary school. The nearest secondary school is in Oberrohrdorf. The nearest Kantonsschulen are in Baden and Wettingen.

== Transportation ==
Bellikon's busiest street is the road running between Baden and the Mutschellen pass. Post bus services are available. The nearest train station is Berikon-Widen on the Bremgarten-Dietikon-Bahn.
