= Widen =

- Municipality
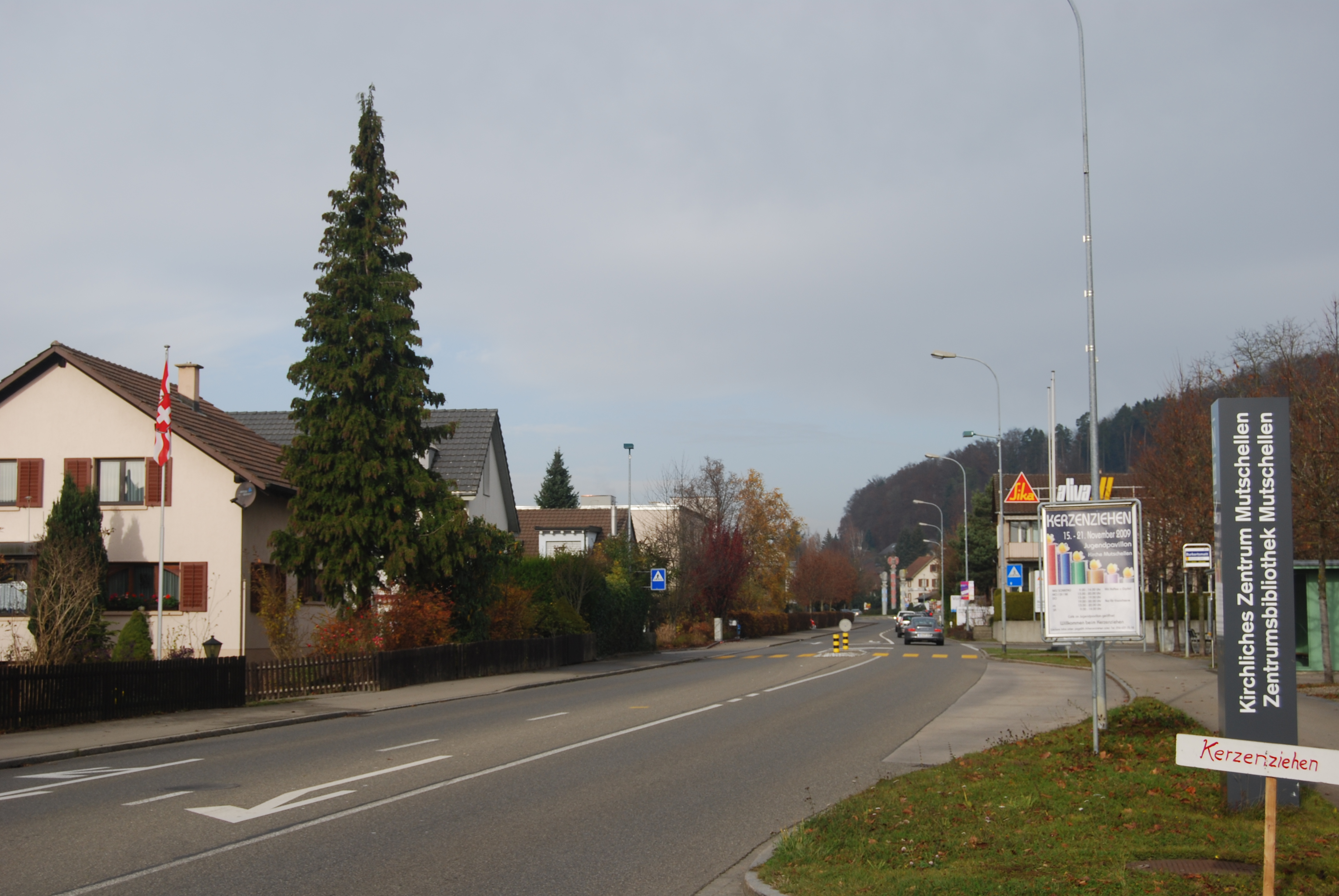

- Flag Coat of arms
- Location of Widen
- Location within Switzerland Location within Canton of Aargau
- Coordinates: 47°22′N 8°22′E
- Country: Switzerland
- Canton: Aargau
- District: Bremgarten (district)

Government
  - Mayor: Gemeindeammann; Vreni Meuwly FDP/PRD (as of 2008)

Area
  - Total: 2.62 km^{2} (1.01 sq mi)
- Elevation: 381 m (1,250 ft)

Population (December 2020)
  - Total: 3,845
  - Density: 1,470/km^{2} (3,800/sq mi)
- Time zone: UTC+01:00 (CET)
  - Summer (DST): UTC+02:00 (CEST)
- Postal code: 8967
- SFOS number: 4081
- ISO 3166 code: CH-AG
- Surrounded by: Bellikon, Bergdietikon, Berikon, Eggenwil, Rudolfstetten-Friedlisberg, Zufikon
- Website: widen.ch

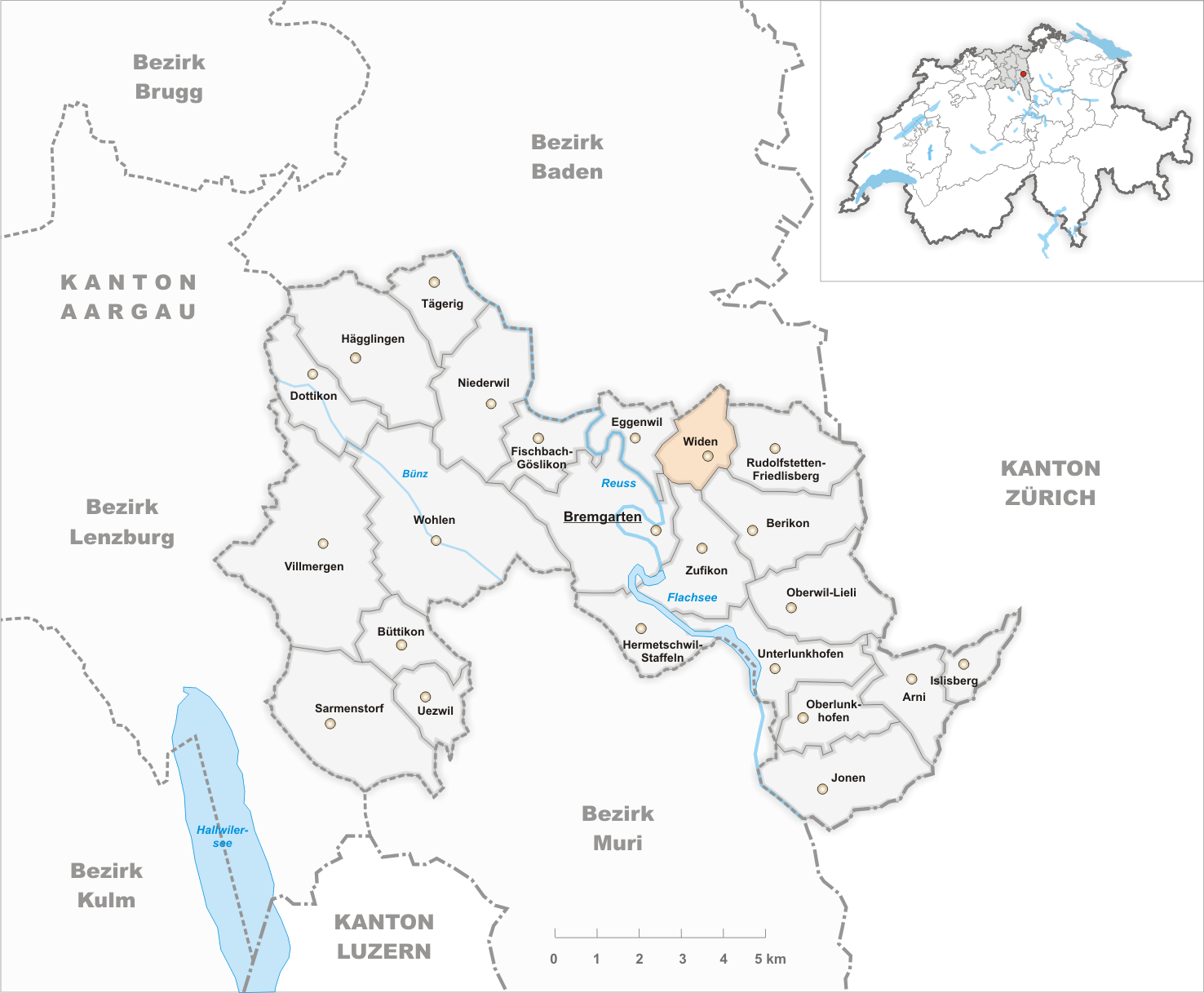
Widen

Widen is a municipality in the district of Bremgarten in the canton of Aargau in Switzerland.

== History ==
At the end of the 12th century a manor called "Wyda" is mentioned the first time, there's no exact year. "Widen", in the way like it's written today, appears the first time during the 14th century.

In medieval times, the manor belonged to Habsburg. 1415 the Eidgenossen conquered the Aargau and Widen then belonged to the Grafschaft Baden. In March 1798 the French conquered Switzerland and proclamated the Helvetic Republic, in which Widen and Eggenwil formed one single municipality in the short-dated canton of Baden. After the foundation of the canton of Aargau 1803, Widen and Eggenwil were separated. Up to that time, there's not much known about Widen, because there are almost no documents left.

Aerial view (1964)

During the 19th century Widen stayed a small village. Many poor inhabitants had to leave their homes and emigrated. The given up farms were freshly occupied by people from the canton of Bern, which were Protestant. That's why today, compared to its merely catholic neighbour villages, Widen has a relatively high percentage of Protestant inhabitants.

On 1 May 1902 the Bremgarten-Dietikon-Bahn was founded and Widen was connected to the railway network, by a station on the Mutschellen pass. During the first half of the 20th century Widen stayed small. However, from 1950 to 1990 the population began to grow rapidly, in 1990 3918 people lived in Widen. The population then sank slightly and now it stays constantly at about 3600 people.

== Geography ==
Widen has an area, as of 2006, of 2.6 square kilometers (1.0 sq mi). Of this area, 44.8% is used for agricultural purposes, while 17% is forested. Of the rest of the land, 37.8% is settled (buildings or roads) and the remainder (0.4%) is non-productive (rivers or lakes).

The village center is situated on a little plateau between the Mutschellen in the south and the Hasenberg in the north, of which the latter is the southernmost part of the Heitersberg. In the west the plateau goes down to the Reuss.

Widen has grown together with some of its neighbour villages Berikon, Rudolfstetten-Friedlisberg and Zufikon. The highest point of the village lies on the Hasenberg at 740 meters (2,430 ft), the lowest point at 430 meters (1,410 ft), near Eggenwil.

Neighbour villages are Bellikon in the north, Bergdietikon in the north-east, Rudolfstetten-Friedlisberg in the east, Berikon in the south-east, Zufikon in the south and Eggenwil in the west.

== Coat of arms ==
The blazon of the municipal coat of arms is Argent a Willow Tree pollarded and eradicated Vert. The tree on the flag of Widen is a willow (German: Weide), so this is an example of canting.

== Demographics ==
Widen has a population (as of 31 December 2020) of 3,845. As of 2008, 12.0% of the population was made up of foreign nationals. Over the last 10 years (1997–2007) the population has changed at a rate of -4%. Most of the population (as of 2000) speaks German (92.8%), with Italian being second most common (1.4%) and French being third (1.0%).

The age distribution, as of 2008, in Widen is; 297 children or 8.3% of the population are between 0 and 9 years old and 372 teenagers or 10.4% are between 10 and 19. Of the adult population, 424 people or 11.9% of the population are between 20 and 29 years old. 416 people or 11.7% are between 30 and 39, 534 people or 15.0% are between 40 and 49, and 597 people or 16.7% are between 50 and 59. The senior population distribution is 520 people or 14.6% of the population are between 60 and 69 years old, 274 people or 7.7% are between 70 and 79, there are 125 people or 3.5% who are between 80 and 89, and there are 7 people or 0.2% who are 90 and older.

As of 2000, there were 116 homes with 1 or 2 persons in the household, 613 homes with 3 or 4 persons in the household, and 710 homes with 5 or more persons in the household. The average number of people per household was 2.39 individuals. In 2008 there were 547 single family homes (or 33.1% of the total) out of a total of 1,651 homes and apartments. There were a total of 21 empty apartments for a 1.3% vacancy rate. As of 2007, the construction rate of new housing units was 0 new units per 1000 residents.

In the 2007 federal election the most popular party was the SVP which received 36.3% of the vote. The next three most popular parties were the CVP (18.3%), the FDP (16.1%) and the SP (15.5%).

In Widen about 84.3% of the population (between age 25-64) have completed either non-mandatory upper secondary education or additional higher education (either university or a Fachhochschule). Of the school age population (in the 2008/2009 school year), there are 215 students attending primary school in the municipality.

The historical population is given in the following table:

Historical population
Year	Pop.	±%
1975	1,851	—
1980	2,715	+46.7%
1990	3,918	+44.3%
2000	583	−85.1%

== Economy ==
As of 2007, Widen had an unemployment rate of 2.11%. As of 2005, there were 36 people employed in the primary economic sector and about 13 businesses involved in this sector. 165 people are employed in the secondary sector and there are 23 businesses in this sector. 576 people are employed in the tertiary sector, with 89 businesses in this sector.

As of 2000 there was a total of 1,917 workers who lived in the municipality. Of these, 1,629 or about 85.0% of the residents worked outside Widen while 430 people commuted into the municipality for work. There were a total of 718 jobs (of at least 6 hours per week) in the municipality. Of the working population, 18.7% used public transportation to get to work, and 57.2% used a private car.

== Religion ==
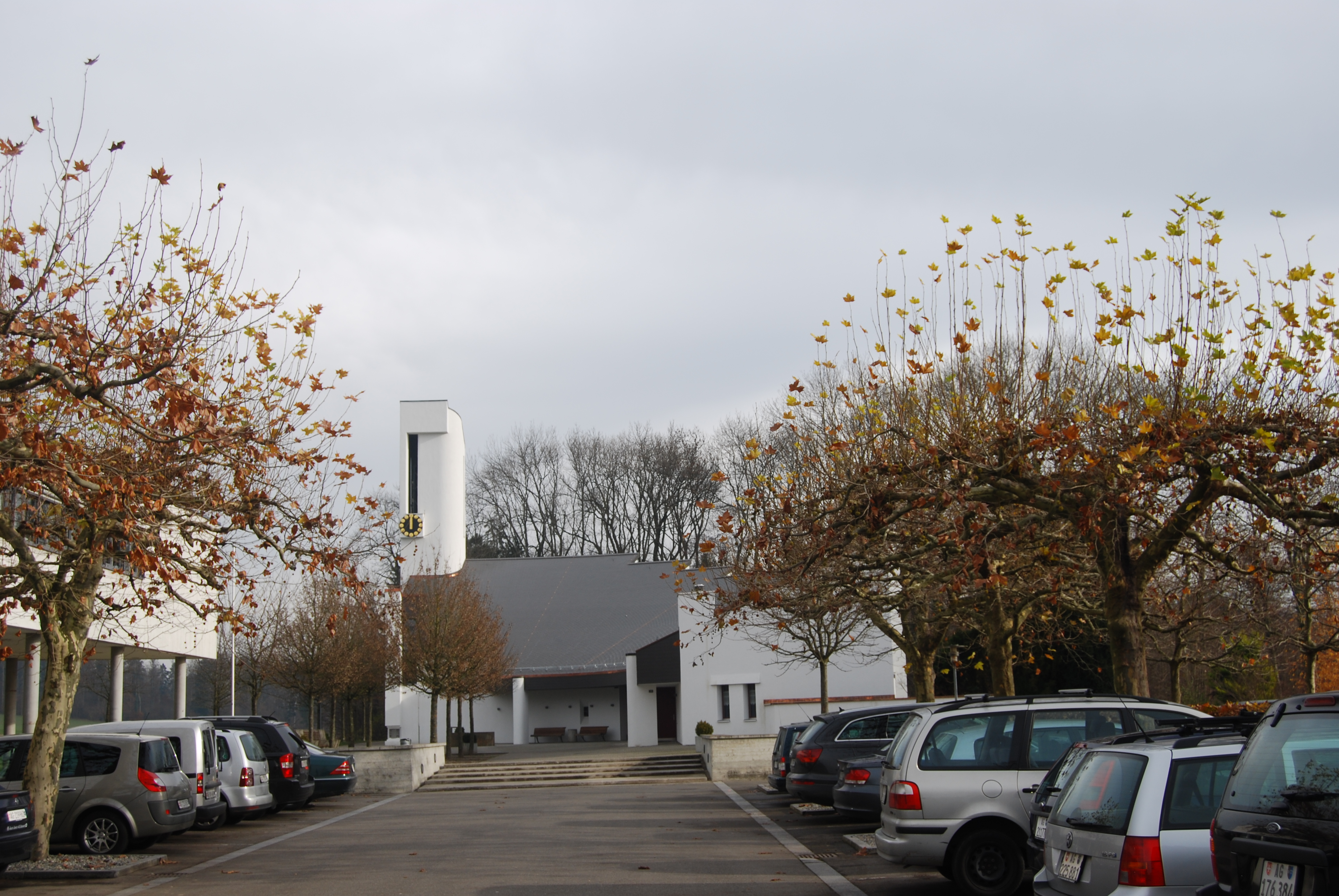
Swiss Reformed church in Widen

From the 2000 census, 1,442 or 39.7% were Roman Catholic, while 1,422 or 39.1% belonged to the Swiss Reformed Church. Of the rest of the population, there were 11 individuals (or about 0.30% of the population) who belonged to the Christian Catholic faith.

== Transportation ==
Berikon-Widen is a stop of the S-Bahn Zürich on the line S17 provided by the Bremgarten-Dietikon-Bahn.
