= Mutschellen =

Pass in the canton of Aargau

Coordinates: 47°21′45.01″N 8°22′02.62″E

Mutschellen Pass
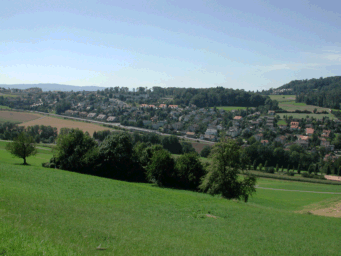
- Mutschellen Pass viewed from the southeast
- Interactive map of Mutschellen Pass
- Elevation: 551 metres (1,808 ft)

Third Approach
- Location: Switzerland
- Range: Alps

Mutschellen is the name of a pass in the canton of Aargau near the border of canton Zurich in Switzerland. Three municipalities, Berikon, Widen, and Rudolfstetten-Friedlisberg, meet directly atop the pass.

== Location and development ==
The pass Mutschellen connects the Reuss valley in the west with communities of greater Zurich in the east. Due to its very low summit of 551 meters above sea level, Mutschellen is often called the lowest pass of Europe.

Directly on the mountain there are three municipalities: Berikon, Rudolfstetten-Friedlisberg and Widen. These three villages have grown together very closely; only those who know the place are able to say where the municipality borders are. Also considered to be part of the Mutschellen region are the municipalities of Zufikon to the west and Oberwil-Lieli to the southeast.

Mutschellen is actually a glacial moraine, which emerged during an ice age. At this time the Reuss glacier and the Linth glacier went northbound as far as the river Rhine. Even today one can see the traces of these monumental glaciers. The glaciers left huge furrows behind and during their retreat left lakes like the lake of Zurich. The pressure of the two glaciers also created the Mutschellen.

== Transportation ==
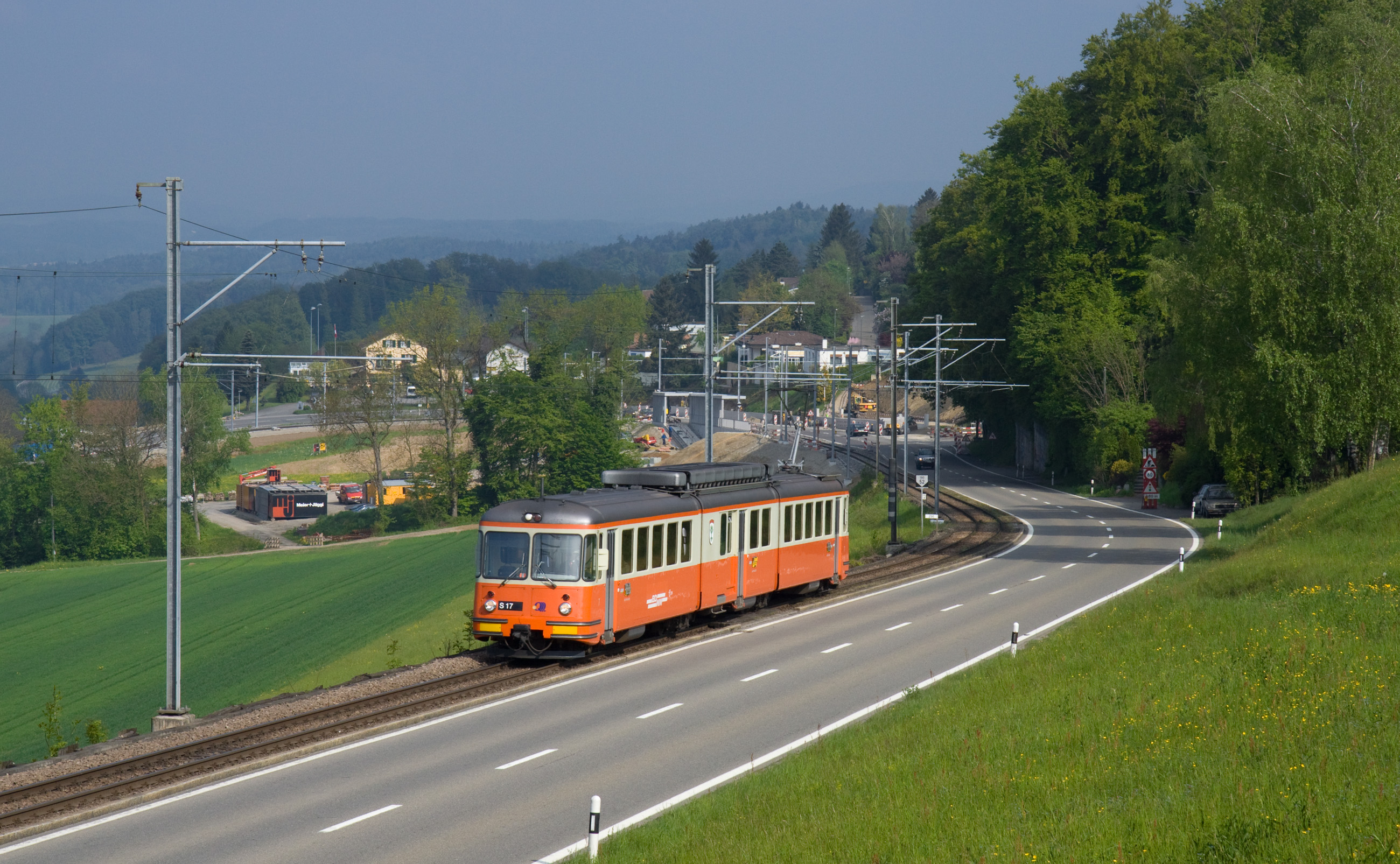
Railway and road climb the western approach to the pass.

The Muschellen hosts an intersection of cantonal street K411 (Bellikonerstrasse/Bahnhofstrasse), running generally northwest–south, and cantonal street K127, roughly east-southwest, formerly as National Road 1 a prime connection between Zurich and Bern, now primarily a connection for Dietikon and Bremgarten. The pass is also crossed by the Bremgarten-Dietikon-Bahn, a metre gauge light railway that is heavily used by commuters traveling into Zurich for work.

The top of the pass features a train station that connects to several bus routes, connecting travelers with the route that runs over the top of the Mutschellen. The area is also a bustling commercial area with Coop and Migros supermarkets, a Denner store, as well as smaller independent stores.
