= Bergdietikon =

- Municipality
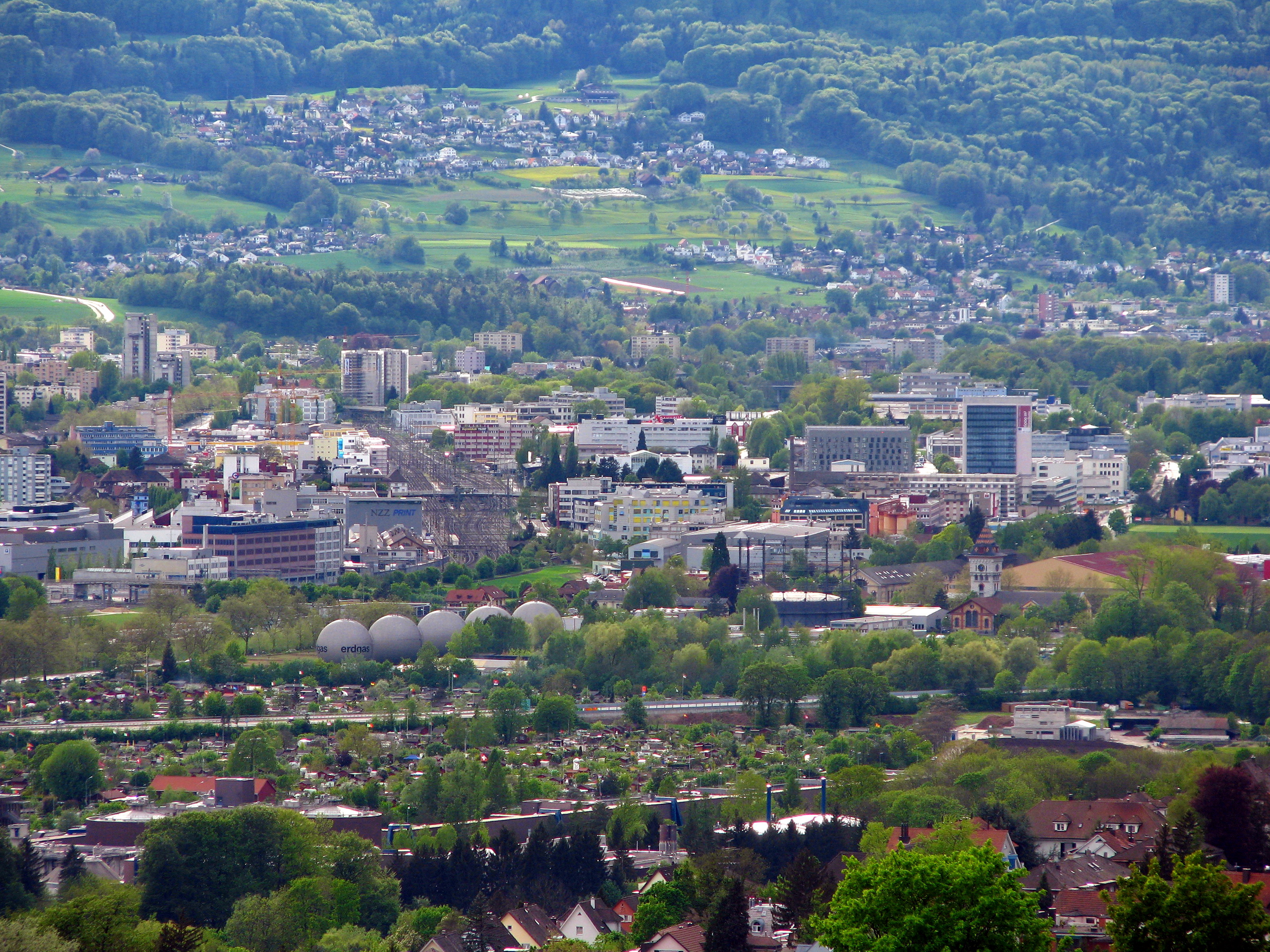

- Flag Coat of arms
- Location of Bergdietikon
- Location within Switzerland Location within Canton of Aargau
- Coordinates: 47°23′N 8°23′E
- Country: Switzerland
- Canton: Aargau
- District: Baden

Area
  - Total: 5.94 km^{2} (2.29 sq mi)
- Elevation: 581 m (1,906 ft)

Population (December 2020)
  - Total: 2,909
  - Density: 490/km^{2} (1,270/sq mi)
- Time zone: UTC+01:00 (CET)
  - Summer (DST): UTC+02:00 (CEST)
- Postal code: 8962
- SFOS number: 4023
- ISO 3166 code: CH-AG
- Surrounded by: Bellikon, Dietikon (ZH), Rudolfstetten-Friedlisberg, Spreitenbach, Urdorf (ZH), Widen
- Website: www.bergdietikon.ch

Bergdietikon is a municipality in the district of Baden in the canton of Aargau in Switzerland. It is located in the Limmat Valley (German: Limmattal).

Aerial view (1964

== History ==
Bergdietikon was originally part of the municipality of Dietikon in the Swiss County of Baden and was part of the short lived Canton of Baden. Following the Act of Mediation in 1803, the Canton of Baden was dismantled and the municipality of Dietikon was split. The mountain settlements in the west became the Berggemeinde Dietikon (Mountain municipality of Dietikon) until 1840 when it was renamed Bergdietikon. While Dietikon went to the Canton of Zurich, Bergdietikon went to Aargau. The creation of a municipality without any historic roots together and with a scattered geography meant that it took quite a while for any municipal center to appear.

== Geography ==
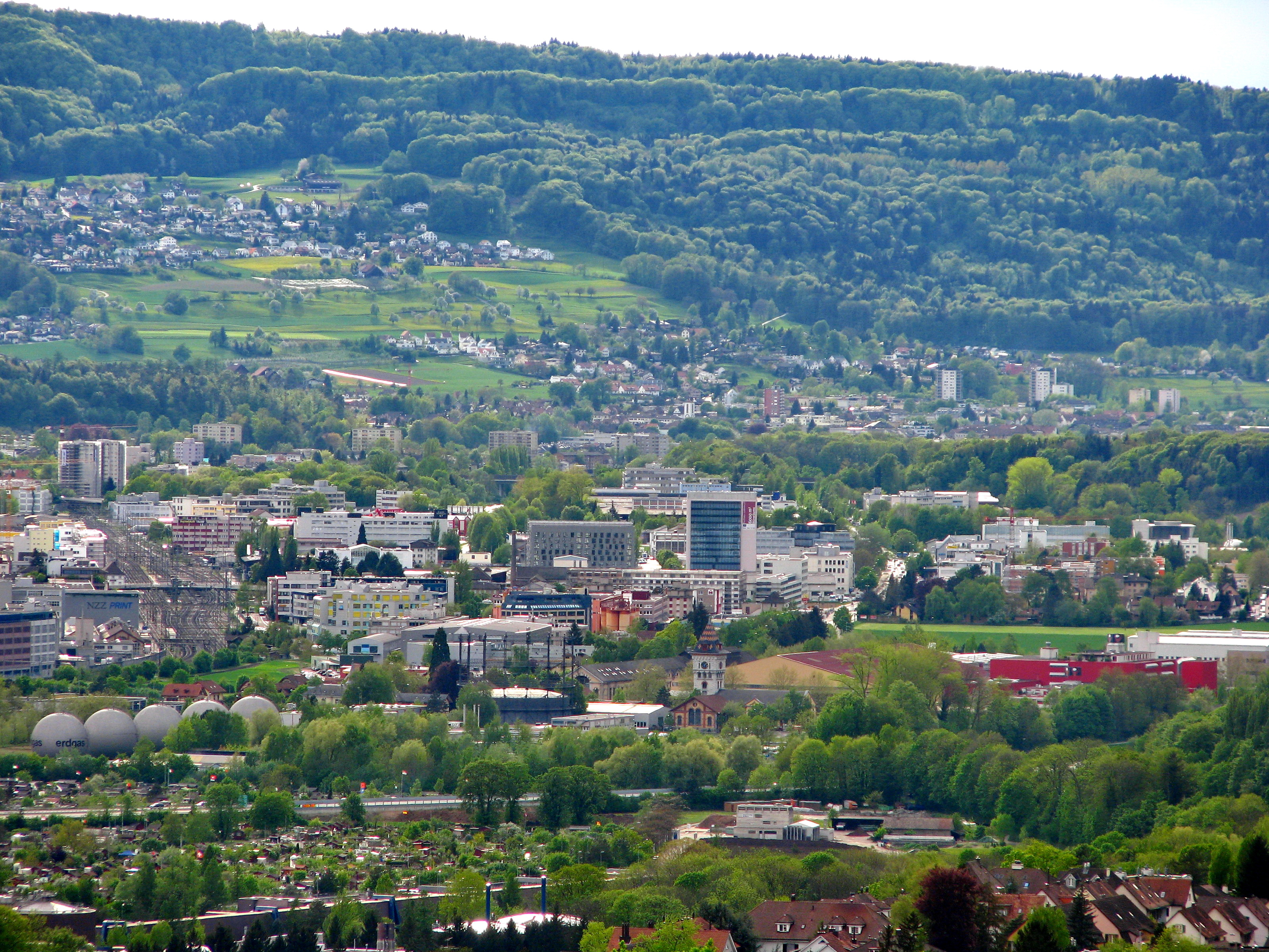
Schlieren, Bergdietikon (to the left) and Dietikon (to the right) in Limmtatal

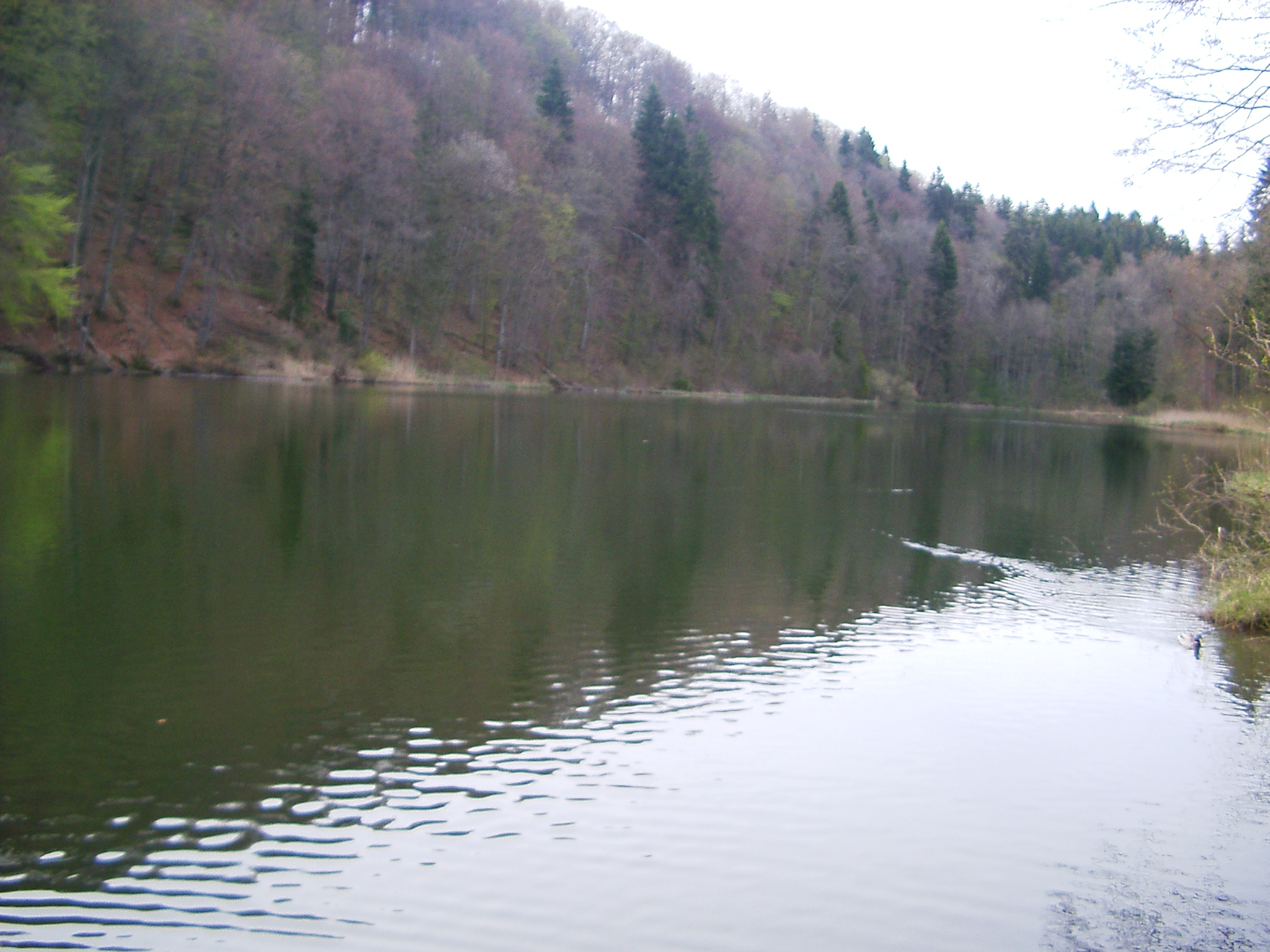
Egelsee in Bergdietikon

Bergdietikon has an area, as of 2006, of 6 km^{2} (2.3 sq mi). Of this area, 54.6% is used for agricultural purposes, while 27.3% is forested. Of the rest of the land, 16.8% is settled (buildings or roads) and the remainder (1.3%) is non-productive (rivers or lakes).

The municipality is located in the Baden district on the southwest slope of the Heitersberg. It consists of the farm settlements of Baltenswil, Schönenberg, Herrenberg, Bernold, Kindhausen and Gwinden.

Egelsee is situated in the municipality.

== Coat of arms ==
The blazon of the municipal coat of arms is Argent an Oak Tree Vert eradicated and Coupeaux of the same.

== Demographics ==
Bergdietikon has a population (as of 31 December 2020) of 2,909. As of 2008, 13.1% of the population was made up of foreign nationals. Over the last 10 years the population has decreased at a rate of -0.5%. Most of the population (as of 2000) speaks German (93.4%), with French being second most common ( 1.3%) and Italian being third ( 1.3%).

The age distribution, as of 2008, in Bergdietikon is; 189 children or 8.3% of the population are between 0 and 9 years old and 190 teenagers or 8.4% are between 10 and 19. Of the adult population, 242 people or 10.7% of the population are between 20 and 29 years old. 238 people or 10.5% are between 30 and 39, 425 people or 18.8% are between 40 and 49, and 359 people or 15.8% are between 50 and 59. The senior population distribution is 320 people or 14.1% of the population are between 60 and 69 years old, 214 people or 9.4% are between 70 and 79, there are 80 people or 3.5% who are between 80 and 89, and there are 9 people or 0.4% who are 90 and older.

As of 2000, there were 85 homes with 1 or 2 persons in the household, 398 homes with 3 or 4 persons in the household, and 458 homes with 5 or more persons in the household. The average number of people per household was 2.31 individuals. In 2008 there were 586 single family homes (or 55.8% of the total) out of a total of 1,051 homes and apartments.

In the 2007 federal election the most popular party was the SVP which received 44.2% of the vote. The next three most popular parties were the FDP (21.4%), the SP (11%) and the CVP (9.3%).

The entire Swiss population is generally well educated. In Bergdietikon about 87.1% of the population (between age 25-64) have completed either non-mandatory upper secondary education or additional higher education (either university or a Fachhochschule). Of the school age population (in the 2008/2009 school year), there are 123 students attending primary school in the municipality.

The historical population is given in the following table:

Historical population
Year	Pop.	±%
1850	491	—
1900	466	−5.1%
1950	514	+10.3%
1970	1,077	+109.5%
2000	2,256	+109.5%

== Economy ==
As of 2007, Bergdietikon had an unemployment rate of 1.47%. As of 2005, there were 70 people employed in the primary economic sector and about 23 businesses involved in this sector. 701 people are employed in the secondary sector and there are 31 businesses in this sector. 233 people are employed in the tertiary sector, with 79 businesses in this sector.

As of 2000 there were 1,251 total workers who lived in the municipality. Of these, 994 or about 79.5% of the residents worked outside Bergdietikon while 738 people commuted into the municipality for work. There were a total of 995 jobs (of at least 6 hours per week) in the municipality.

== Religion ==
From the 2000 census, 763 or 33.8% are Roman Catholic, while 1,109 or 49.2% belonged to the Swiss Reformed Church. Of the rest of the population, there are 4 individuals (or about 0.18% of the population) who belong to the Christian Catholic faith.
