= Berikon =

- Municipality
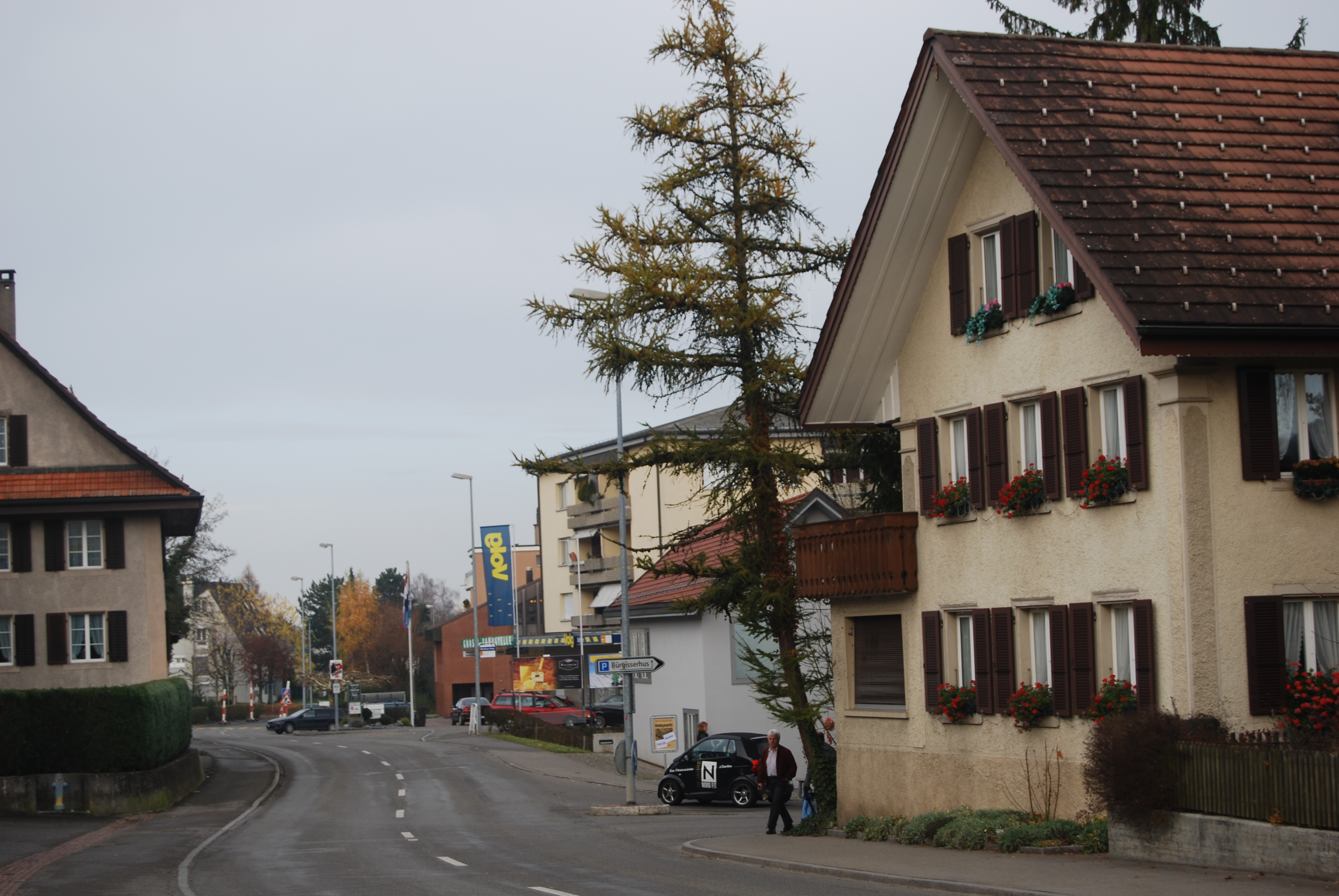

- Flag Coat of arms
- Location of Berikon
- Location within Switzerland Location within Canton of Aargau
- Coordinates: 47°21′N 8°22′E
- Country: Switzerland
- Canton: Aargau
- District: Bremgarten

Government
  - Mayor: Frau Gemeindeammann; Petra Oggenfuss Feldgrill GLP Mutschellen

Area
  - Total: 5.36 km^{2} (2.07 sq mi)
- Elevation: 551 m (1,808 ft)

Population (December 2020)
  - Total: 4,749
  - Density: 886/km^{2} (2,290/sq mi)
- Demonym: German: Beriker(in)
- Time zone: UTC+01:00 (CET)
  - Summer (DST): UTC+02:00 (CEST)
- Postal code: 8965
- SFOS number: 4062
- ISO 3166 code: CH-AG
- Surrounded by: Birmensdorf (ZH); Oberwil-Lieli; Rudolfstetten-Friedlisberg; Widen; Zufikon
- Twin towns: Würenlingen (Switzerland)
- Website: Official website

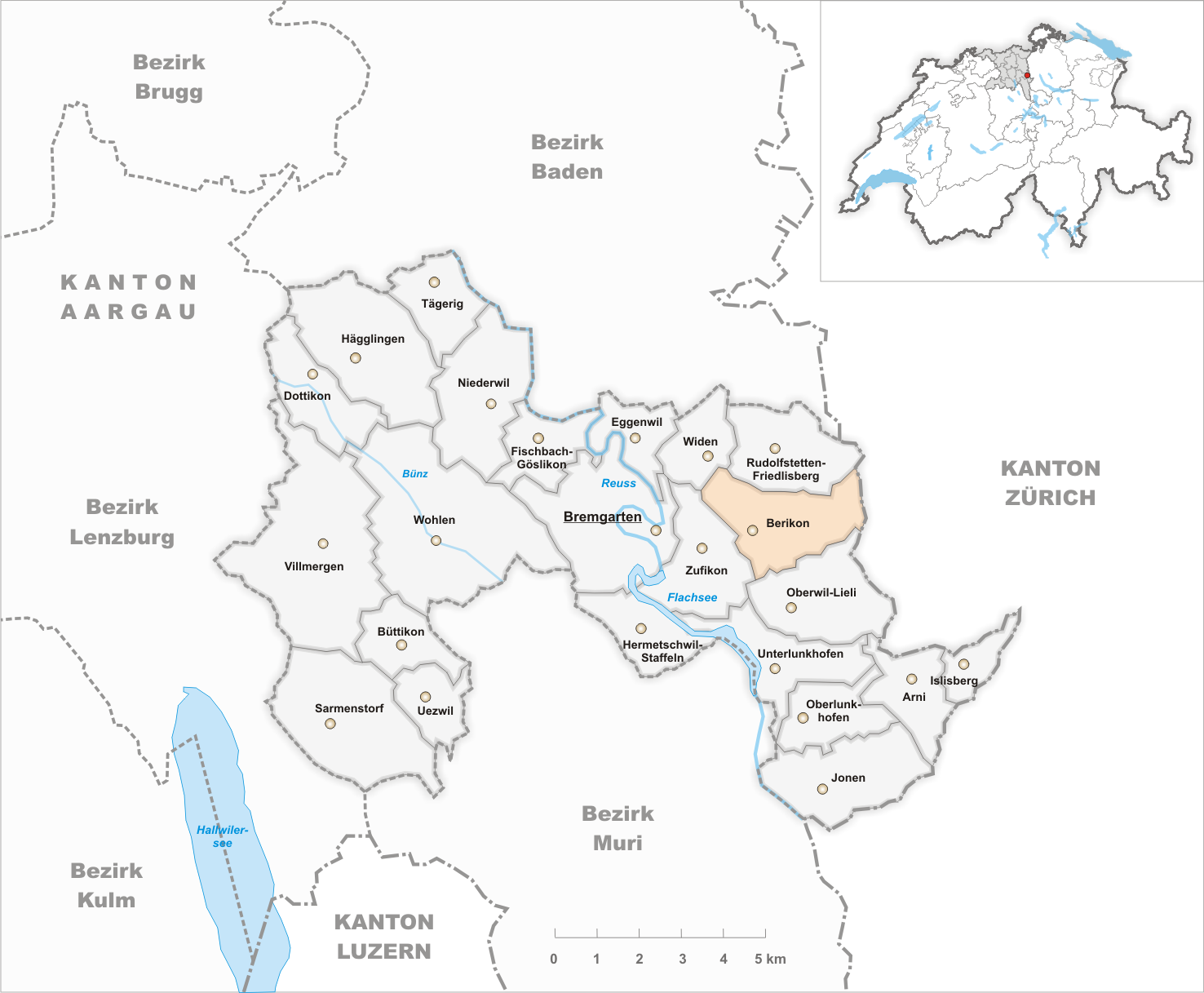
Berikon

Berikon is a municipality in the district of Bremgarten in the canton of Aargau in Switzerland.

The village lies on a hill above and to the east of the Reuss Valley, covering part of the Mutschellen Pass. This municipality is bounded by Rudolfstetten-Friedlisberg, Widen, Zufikon, and Oberwil-Lieli, all in canton Aargau, and shares a boundary with the canton of Zürich (district of Dietikon) to the east.

== History ==
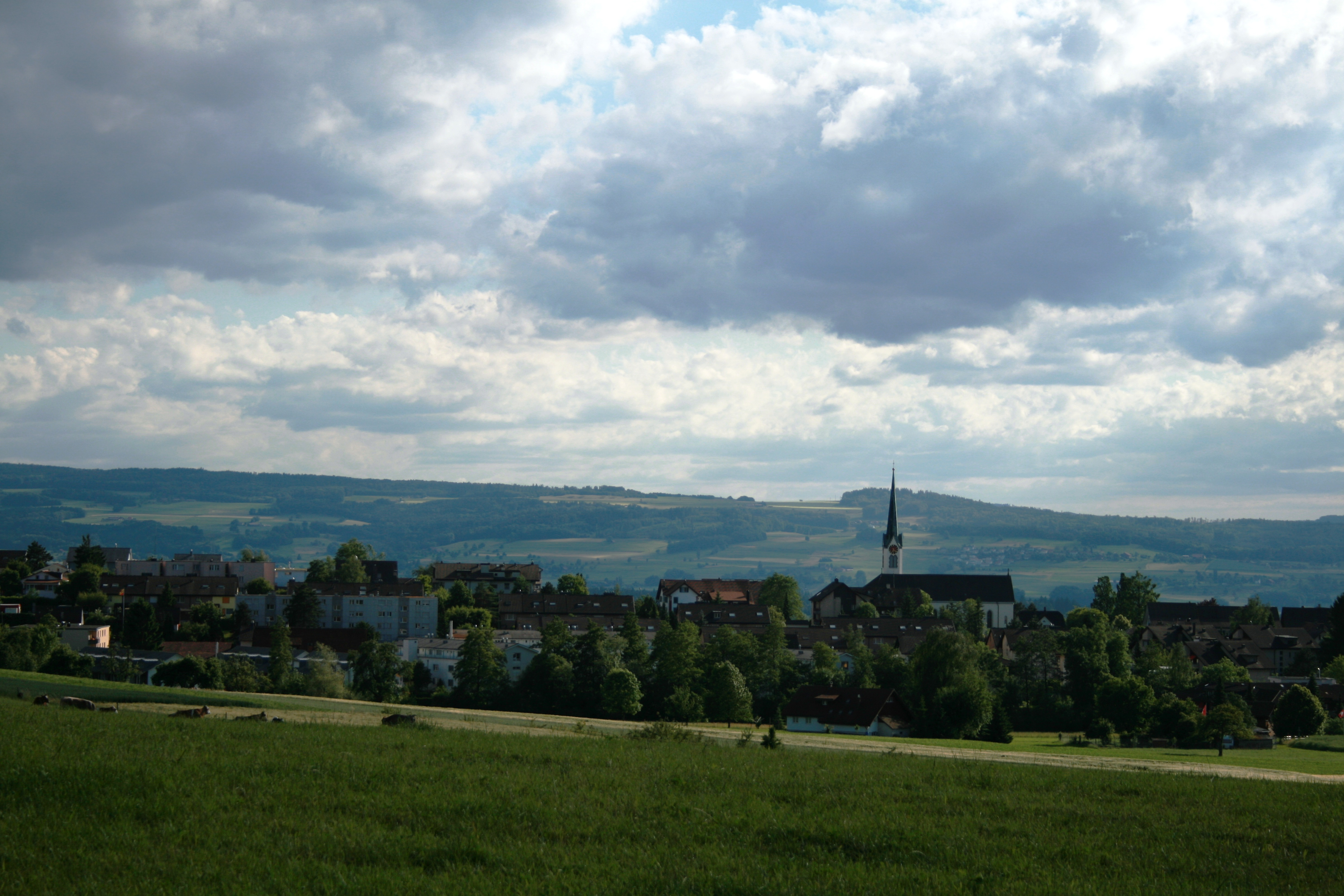
Berikon

Aerial view (1966)

Berikon was mentioned for the first time in 1153 as a court place "Berchheim". In 1184 it was mentioned as Berchein. Over time, the name of the place changed from Berchheim to Bergheim, then to Berchan, Berkein, and finally Berikon.

The originally separate settlements Unterberikon (Lower Berikon) and Oberberikon (Upper Berikon) fell under the territorial lordship of the city of Zürich in 1415, when the Eidgenossen (Confederacy) conquered Aargau. Later, in 1471, Unterberikon became part of Amt Rohrdorf in the county of Baden, while Oberberikon fell under the oversight of the Kelleramt (Freiamt Affoltern).

When in 1798 the French overran Switzerland and instituted the Helvetic Republic, both municipalities came to the short-lived canton of Baden. During the establishment of the canton of Aargau in 1803, the two municipalities were reunited and joined the district of Bremgarten.

On 1 May 1902, the Bremgarten-Dietikon-Bahn was opened, giving Berikon a railway connection to the rest of Switzerland. Still, until well into the 20th century, Berikon was a rural village, populated by just 900 inhabitants in 1950, before a sudden boom of construction activity occurred. Within thirty years the total population increased by over 150%. Today's population is roughly quadruple that of the 1960s. Berikon has grown together with the neighbouring municipalities and is today part of the agglomeration of Zürich.

== Geography ==
Berikon has an area, as of 2006, of 5.4 square kilometers (2.1 sq mi). Of this area, 49.7% is used for agricultural purposes, while 31.4% is forested. The rest of the land (18.9%) is settled. The elevation is officially 551 m (1,808 ft) above sea level (without an indication of where in the village this is measured).

The municipality is located in the Bremgarten district, and is located on the Mutschellenhöhe. It consists of the originally separate villages of Ober- and Unter-Berikon.

== Coat of arms ==
The blazon of the municipal coat of arms is Argent a Trefoil slipped Vert.

== Demographics ==
At the end of 2008 Berikon had 4,491 residents, of whom 591 (13.2%) were non-Swiss, and 50.2% were female. As of December 2020 Berikon had a population of 4,749, of which 13.9% of the population was made up of foreign nationals. According to the federal census of 2000, the 4358 residents in 1821 households included only 464 foreigners (10.6%).

As of April 2026 the population of 5,039 included 3,939 Swiss, with 1,100 foreign nationals (21.85%). Most of the population (as of 2000) speaks German (92.6%), with Italian being second-most common (1.6%) and French being third (1.0%).

The age distribution, as of 2008, in Berikon was; 457 children or 10.2% of the population were between 0 and 9 years old and 517 teenagers or 11.5% were between 10 and 19. Of the adult population, 581 people or 12.9% of the population were between 20 and 29 years old. 651 people or 14.5% were between 30 and 39, 813 people or 18.1% were between 40 and 49, and 650 people or 14.5% were between 50 and 59. The senior population distribution was 485 people or 10.8% of the population were between 60 and 69 years old, 237 people or 5.3% were between 70 and 79, there were 87 people or 1.9% who were between 80 and 89, and there were 13 people or 0.3% 90 and older.

As of 2000 the average number of residents per living room was 0.56 which is about equal to the cantonal average of 0.57 per room. In this case, a room is defined as space of a housing unit of at least 4 m^{2} (43 sq ft) as normal bedrooms, dining rooms, living rooms, kitchens and habitable cellars and attics. About 34.9% of the total households were owner occupied, or in other words did not pay rent (though they may have a mortgage or a rent-to-own agreement). As of 2000, there were 127 homes with 1 or 2 persons in the household, 952 homes with 3 or 4 persons in the household, and 684 homes with 5 or more persons in the household. The average number of people per household was 2.40 individuals. In 2008 there were 548 single family homes (or 27.5% of the total) out of a total of 1,993 homes and apartments. There were a total of 17 empty apartments for a 0.9% vacancy rate. As of 2007, the construction rate of new housing units was 0.5 new units per 1000 residents.

The historical population is given in the following table:

Historical population
Year	Pop.	±%
1850	549	—
1900	701	+27.7%
1950	900	+28.4%
1970	1,593	+77.0%
2000	4,358	+173.6%
2020	4,749	+9.0%

== Religion ==
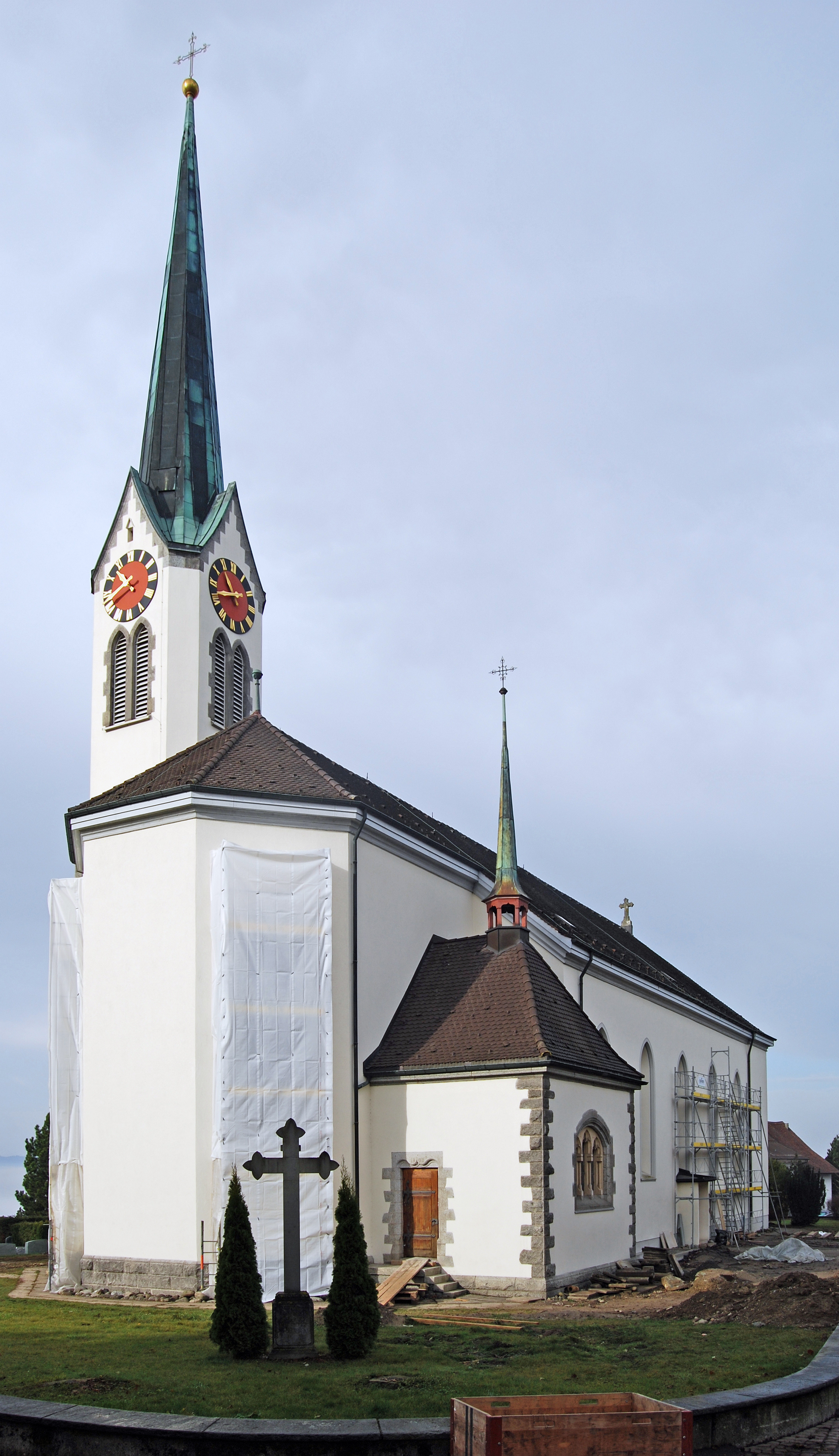
Village church of Berikon

From the 2000 census, 2,030 or 46.6% were Roman Catholic, while 1,545 or 35.5% belonged to the Swiss Reformed Church. Of the rest of the population, there were 3 individuals (or about 0.07% of the population) who belonged to the Christian Catholic faith.

== Administration ==
The legislative function is exercised by the Gemeindeversammlung or town meeting. The executive in Berikon is handled by a five-member Gemeinderat (town council), the members of which are elected by a plurality voting system for a four-year term. The Gemeinderat leads and represents the village, as well as performing the tasks determined by the Gemeindeversammlung, as well as those delegated by the canton and federal agencies.

Minor legal and civil disagreements fall under the jurisdiction of the Friedensrichterkreis (similar to a Justice of the Peace) of Bremgarten.

In the 2007 federal election the most popular party was the SVP which received 34.2% of the vote. The next three most popular parties were the SP (18.7%), the CVP (18.1%) and the FDP (14.1%).

== Education ==
In Berikon about 84.7% of the population (between age 25–64) have completed either non-mandatory upper secondary education or additional higher education (either university or a Fachhochschule). Of the school age population (in the 2008/2009 school year), there were 334 students attending primary school, 312 students attending secondary school, and 284 students attending tertiary or university level schooling in the municipality.

Berikon has primary schools of its own from kindergarten up through intermediate school (Bezirksschule, grades 6 through 9). The nearest Kantonsschule (canton school), a secondary school, is in Wohlen.

== Economy ==
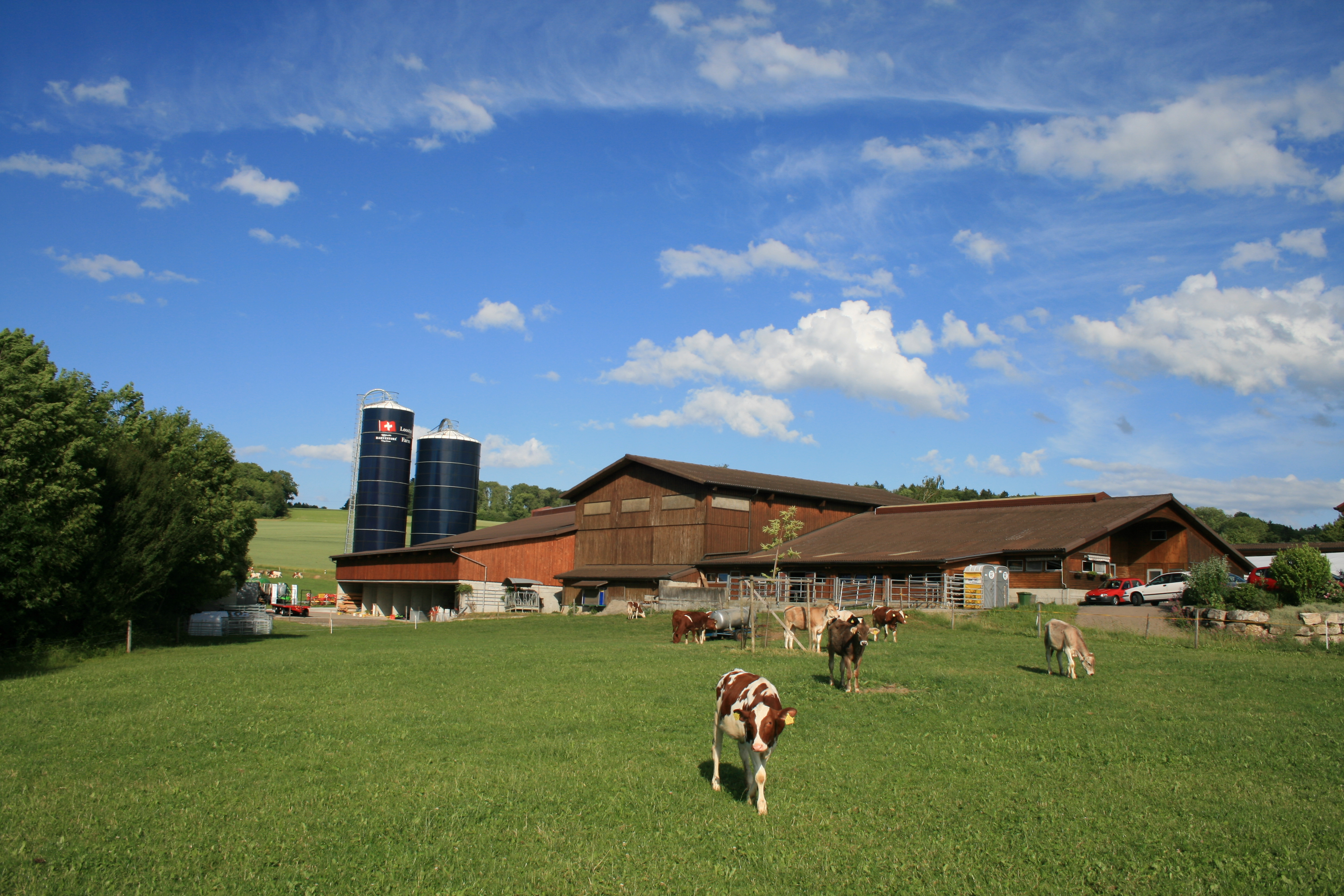
Farm in Berikon

As of 2007, Berikon had an unemployment rate of 2.46%. As of 2005, there were 85 people employed in the primary economic sector and about 22 businesses involved in this sector. 142 people are employed in the secondary sector and there are 33 businesses in this sector. 956 people are employed in the tertiary sector, with 191 businesses in this sector.

As of 2000 there were 2,504 total workers who lived in the municipality. Of these, 2,037 or about 81.3% of the residents worked outside Berikon while 644 people commuted into the municipality for work. There were a total of 1,111 jobs (of at least 6 hours per week) in the municipality. Of the working population, 19.5% used public transportation to get to work, and 56.9% used a private car. The majority of the working residents commute to jobs in the city of Zürich or in the towns of the nearby Limmat Valley (Dietikon, Spreitenbach, Schlieren).

== Transportation ==
The Berikon-Widen station of the Bremgarten-Dietikon-Bahn stands right on the Mutschellen pass. This station is a stop of the S-Bahn Zürich on the line S17 serviced by the Bremgarten-Dietikon-Bahn. Buses of two Postauto lines, each with a terminus at Berikon-Widen station, connect the Mutschellen communities with Baden to the north and Zürich at the Wiedikon station to the east. The No. 350 Postauto line to Zürich Wiedikon also affords a good connection in Birmensdorf with the S9 and S15 train lines to Zürich, Affoltern am Albis, and Zug.

Before the A1 expressway was built, the Mutschellen pass was the main connection for auto traffic between Zürich and Bern. Now, the road to Bern (Bernstrasse or Hauptstrasse 1) is still an important carrier of road traffic, particularly commuters. With the completion of the A4 expressway much more traffic (at least 5% by 2015) was expected through Berikon for travellers heading for the interchange at Birmensdorf (approx. 3 km away). Berikon performed roadwork with a view to reduce the flow of transit vehicles. The project implementing these remedial measures is planned to last some 2.5 years and was to be completed in autumn of 2011.
