= Eggenwil =

- Municipality
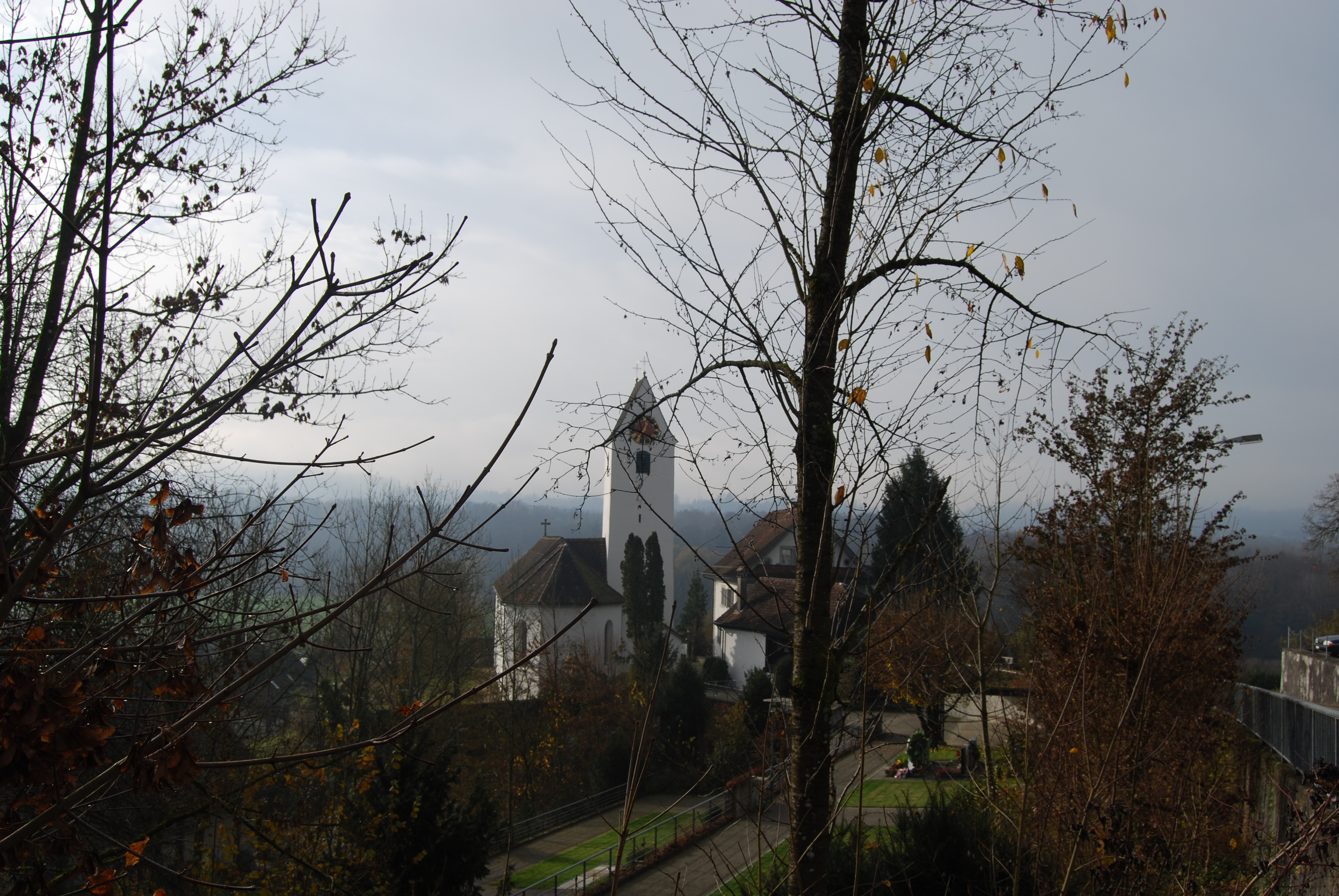

- Flag Coat of arms
- Location of Eggenwil
- Location within Switzerland Location within Canton of Aargau
- Coordinates: 47°22′N 8°20′E
- Country: Switzerland
- Canton: Aargau
- District: Bremgarten

Area
  - Total: 2.46 km^{2} (0.95 sq mi)
- Elevation: 383 m (1,257 ft)

Population (December 2020)
  - Total: 1,042
  - Density: 424/km^{2} (1,100/sq mi)
- Time zone: UTC+01:00 (CET)
  - Summer (DST): UTC+02:00 (CEST)
- Postal code: 5445
- SFOS number: 4066
- ISO 3166 code: CH-AG
- Surrounded by: Bellikon, Bremgarten, Fischbach-Göslikon, Künten, Widen, Zufikon
- Website: www.eggenwil.ch

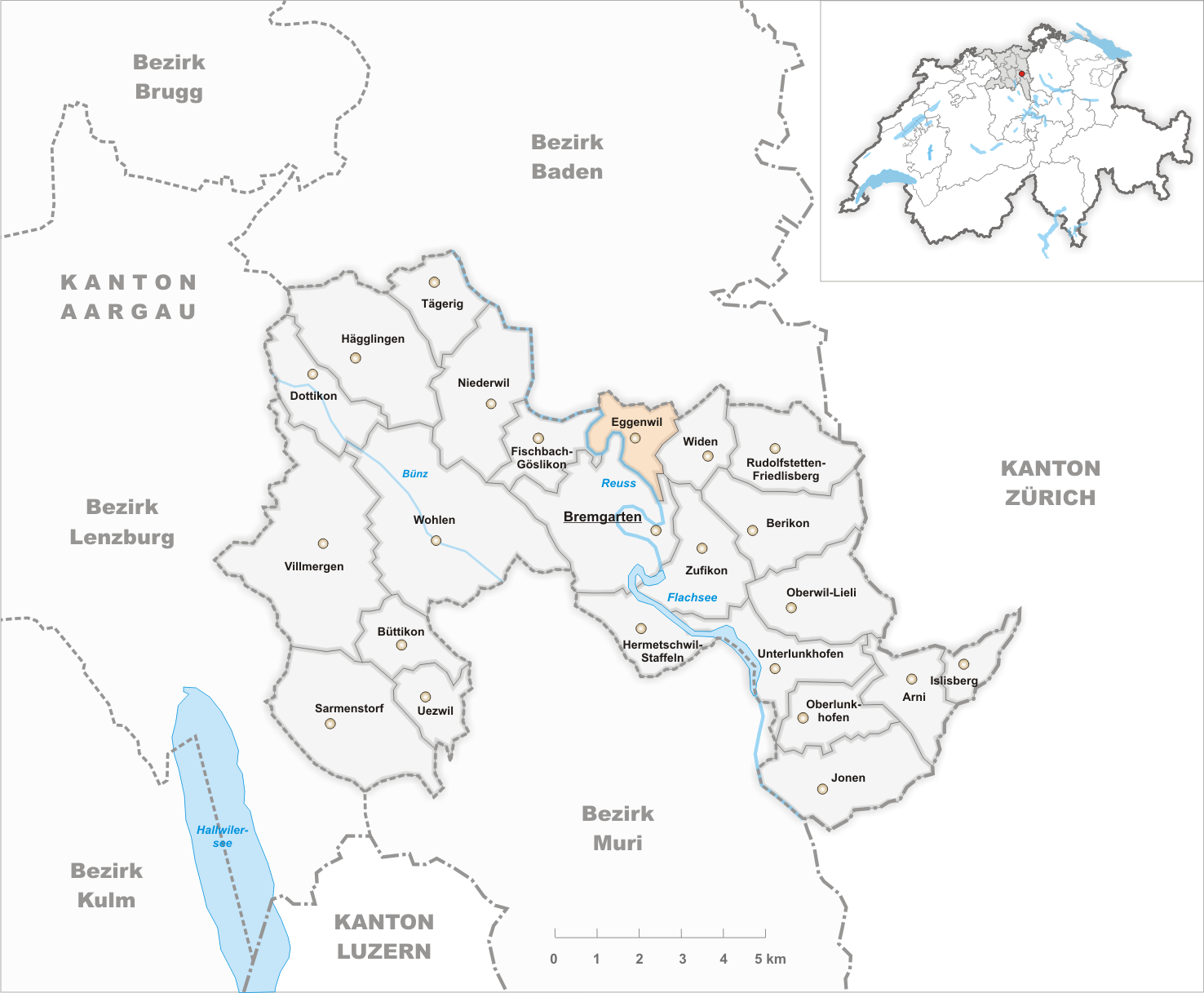
Eggenwil

Eggenwil is a municipality in the district of Bremgarten in the canton of Aargau in Switzerland.

== History ==
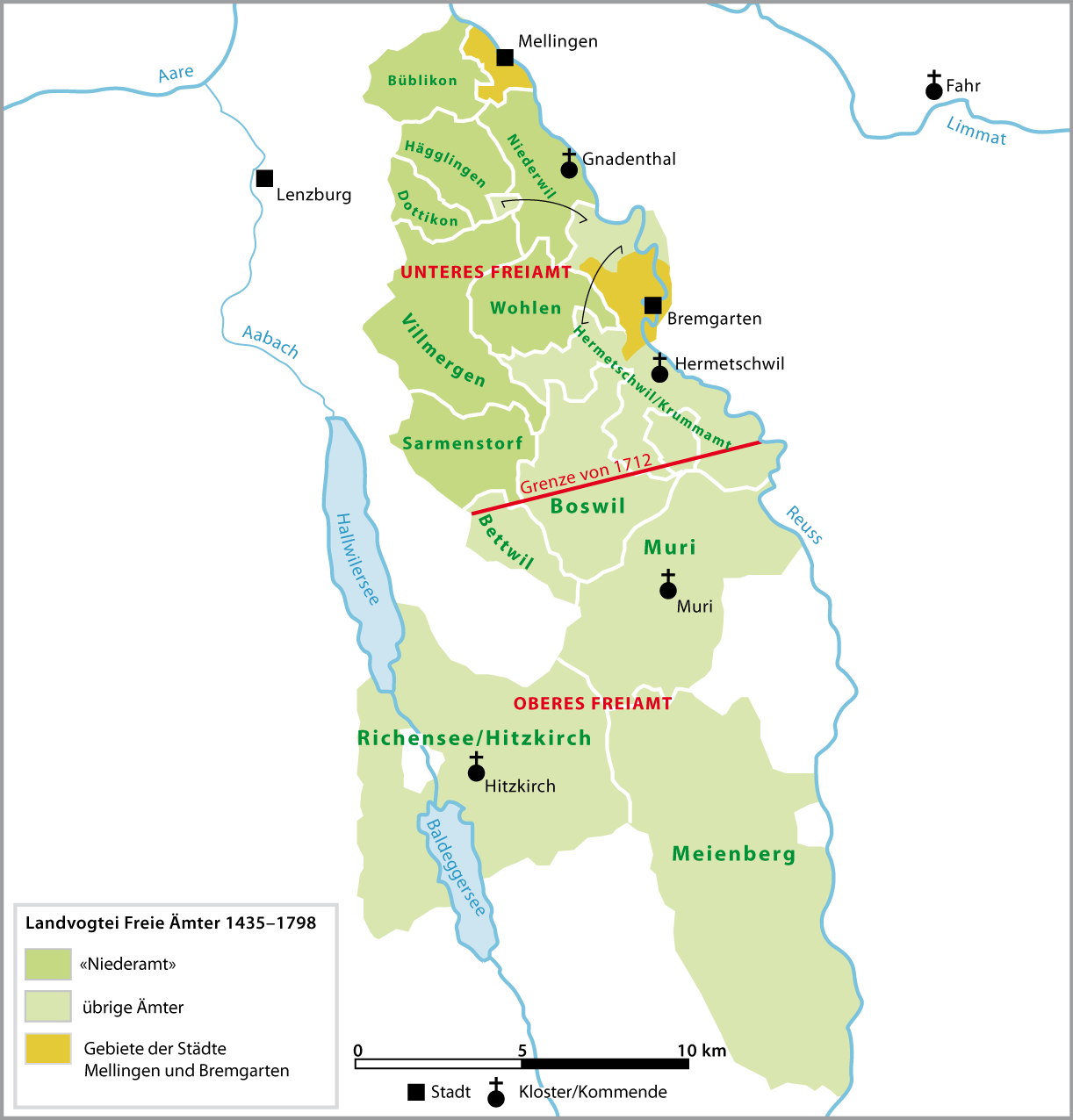
Map of the Freie Ämter including Amt Hermetschwil

Eggenwil is first mentioned about 1160 as Egenwilare in a donation document, the Acta Murensia. The village and church were given by Albert II, Count of Habsburg (died 1140) to Muri Abbey. However, the Habsburg rights of Low justice were given to the Hermetschwil abbey. In 1415 the canton of Aargau was taken from the Habsburgs by the Swiss Confederates. While Bern kept the southwest portion (Zofingen, Aarburg, Aarau, Lenzburg, and Brugg). Some districts, named the Freie Ämter or free bailiwicks, with the County of Baden, were governed as "subject lands" by all or some of the Confederates. Part of Eggenwil was transferred to the Amt Hermetschwil of the Freie Ämter, and the portions of the village north of the main road became part of the County of Baden. During the Helvetic Republic (1798–1803) Eggenwil and Widen formed a single municipality. Since the end of the Helvetic Republic, Eggenwil has been an independent municipality 1798–1803.

The village church, St. Lawrence's Church, was built in 1064 and converted into a Swiss Reformed Church in 1529 during the Protestant Reformation. In 1683 the choir was renovated. The parish of Eggenwil has existed since 1944.

Until a phylloxera outbreak in the 19th century, vineyards were the main source of income for the municipality. In 2000 less than one fifth of the workforce in Eggenwil works in the secondary sector of the economy while more than half work in the tertiary sector. Approximately three quarters of the working population were commuters, especially in the region of Baden and Zurich.

== Geography ==
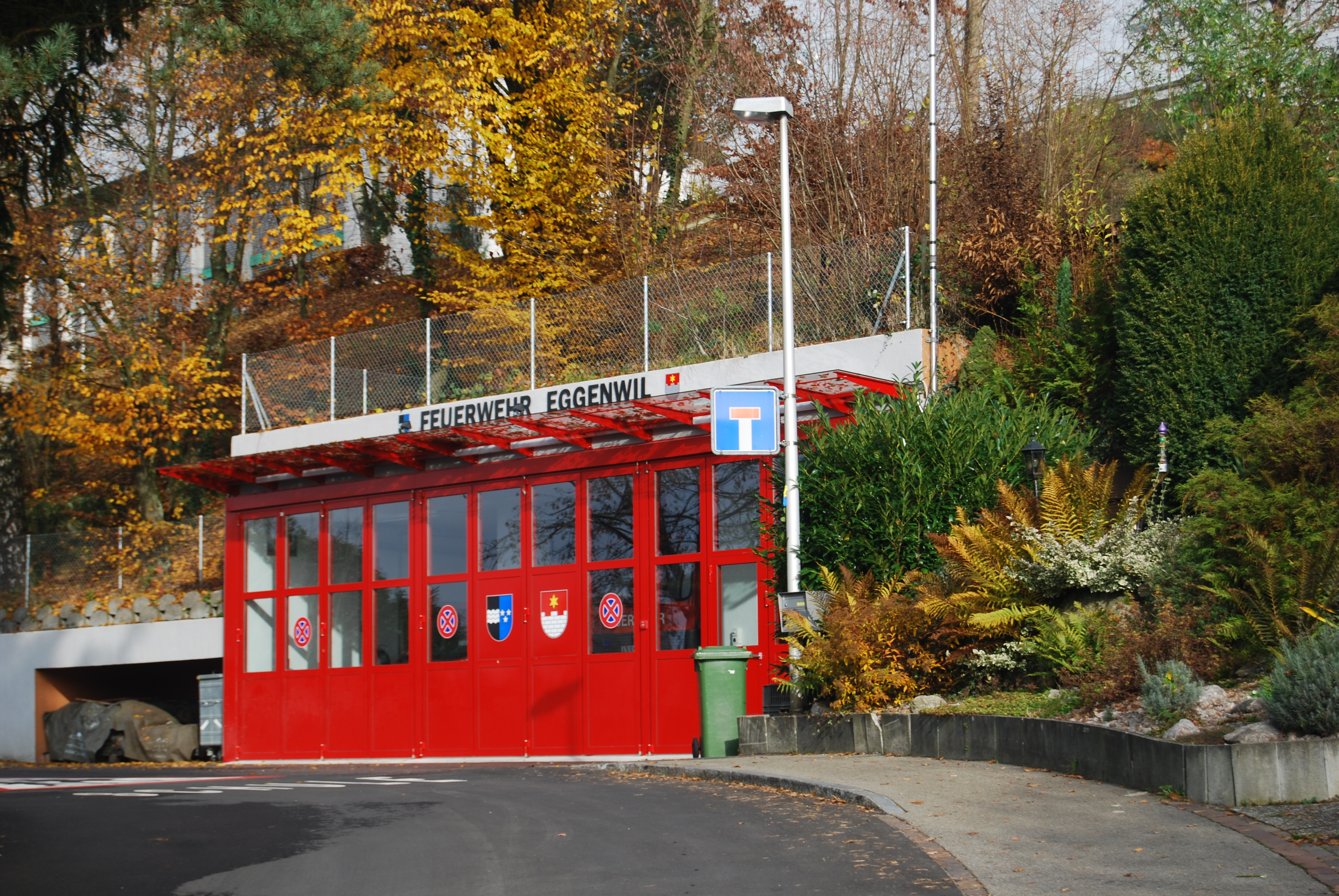
Fire station built into a hill side in Eggenwil

Eggenwil has an area, as of 2006, of 2.5 square kilometers (0.97 sq mi). Of this area, 54.7% is used for agricultural purposes, while 27.5% is forested. Of the rest of the land, 12.1% is settled (buildings or roads) and the remainder (5.7%) is non-productive (rivers or lakes).

The municipality is located in the Bremgarten district, on a terrace at the foot of the Hasenberg and along the right bank of the Reuss river.

== Coat of arms ==
The blazon of the municipal coat of arms is Gules Walls embattled Argent masoned Sable issuant from base and in chief a Mullet Or.

== Demographics ==
Eggenwil has a population (as of 31 December 2020) of 1,042. As of 2008, 15.9% of the population was made up of foreign nationals. Over the last 10 years the population has grown at a rate of 20.2%. Most of the population (as of 2000) speaks German (94.8%), with French being second most common ( 1.0%) and Portuguese being third ( 1.0%).

The age distribution, as of 2008, in Eggenwil is; 76 children or 9.4% of the population are between 0 and 9 years old and 86 teenagers or 10.6% are between 10 and 19. Of the adult population, 95 people or 11.7% of the population are between 20 and 29 years old. 102 people or 12.6% are between 30 and 39, 155 people or 19.1% are between 40 and 49, and 150 people or 18.5% are between 50 and 59. The senior population distribution is 92 people or 11.4% of the population are between 60 and 69 years old, 45 people or 5.6% are between 70 and 79, there are 6 people or 0.7% who are between 80 and 89, and there are 3 people or 0.4% who are 90 and older.

As of 2000 the average number of residents per living room was 0.55 which is about equal to the cantonal average of 0.57 per room. In this case, a room is defined as space of a housing unit of at least 4 m^{2} (43 sq ft) as normal bedrooms, dining rooms, living rooms, kitchens and habitable cellars and attics. About 65.9% of the total households were owner occupied, or in other words did not pay rent (though they may have a mortgage or a rent-to-own agreement). As of 2000, there were 26 homes with 1 or 2 persons in the household, 97 homes with 3 or 4 persons in the household, and 132 homes with 5 or more persons in the household. The average number of people per household was 2.48 individuals. In 2008 there were 182 single family homes (or 47.5% of the total) out of a total of 383 homes and apartments. There were a total of 26 empty apartments for a 6.8% vacancy rate. As of 2007, the construction rate of new housing units was 7.9 new units per 1000 residents.

In the 2007 federal election the most popular party was the SVP which received 39.2% of the vote. The next three most popular parties were the SP (18.5%), the CVP (14.8%) and the FDP (12.1%).

The entire Swiss population is generally well educated. In Eggenwil about 81.1% of the population (between age 25 and 64) have completed either non-mandatory upper secondary education or additional higher education (either university or a Fachhochschule). Of the school age population (in the 2008/2009 school year), there are 48 students attending primary school in the municipality.

The historical population is given in the following table:

Historical population
Year	Pop.	±%
1850	281	—
1900	219	−22.1%
1950	270	+23.3%
2000	669	+147.8%

== Economy ==
As of 2007, Eggenwil had an unemployment rate of 1.81%. As of 2005, there were 32 people employed in the primary economic sector and about 6 businesses involved in this sector. 15 people are employed in the secondary sector and there are 4 businesses in this sector. 66 people are employed in the tertiary sector, with 27 businesses in this sector.

As of 2000 there were 384 total workers who lived in the municipality. Of these, 312 or about 81.3% of the residents worked outside Eggenwil while 67 people commuted into the municipality for work. There were a total of 139 jobs (of at least 6 hours per week) in the municipality. Of the working population, 11.3% used public transportation to get to work, and 60.8% used a private car.

== Religion ==
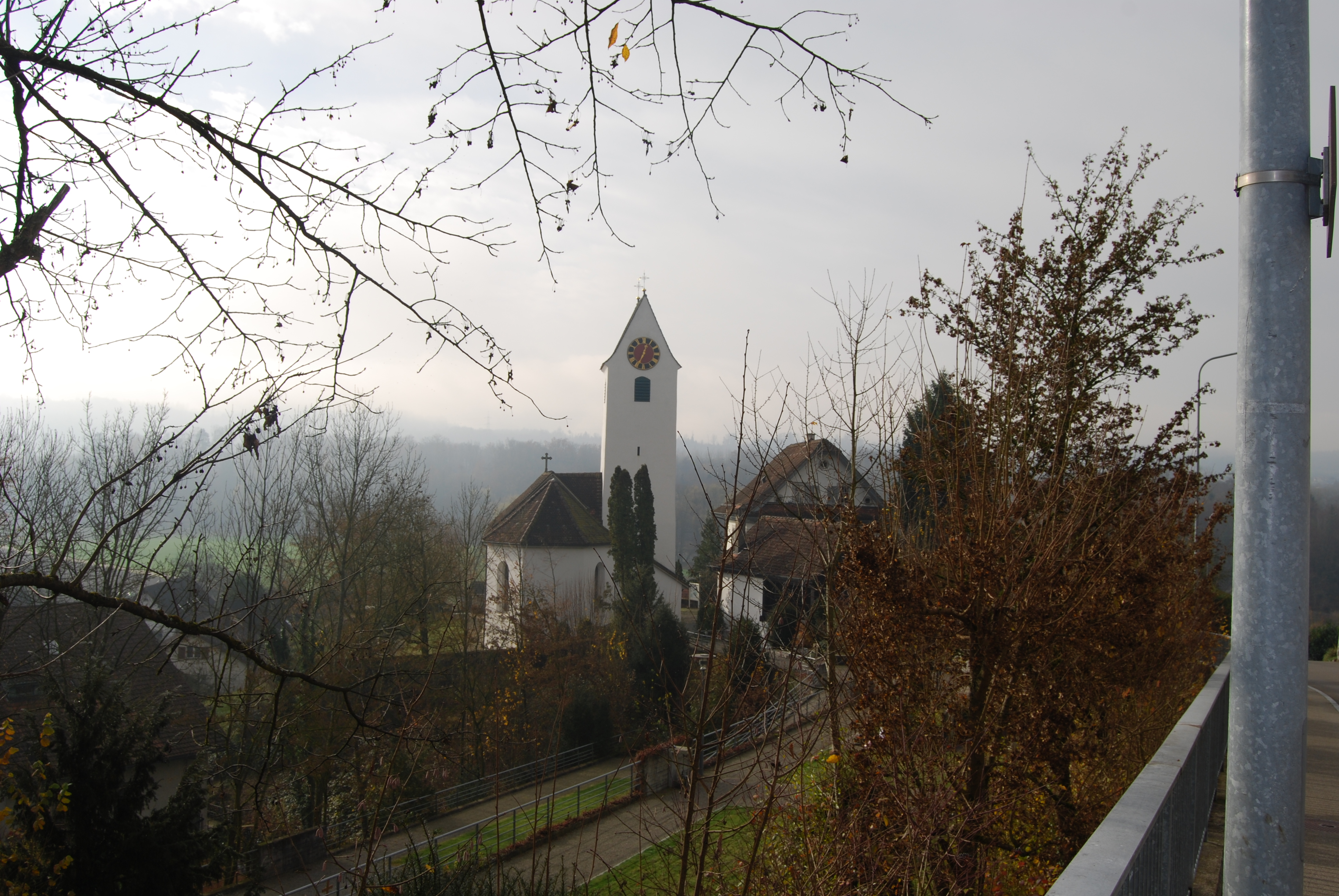
Village Church of Eggenwil

From the 2000 census, 289 or 43.2% were Roman Catholic, while 249 or 37.2% belonged to the Swiss Reformed Church.
