= Zufikon =

- Municipality
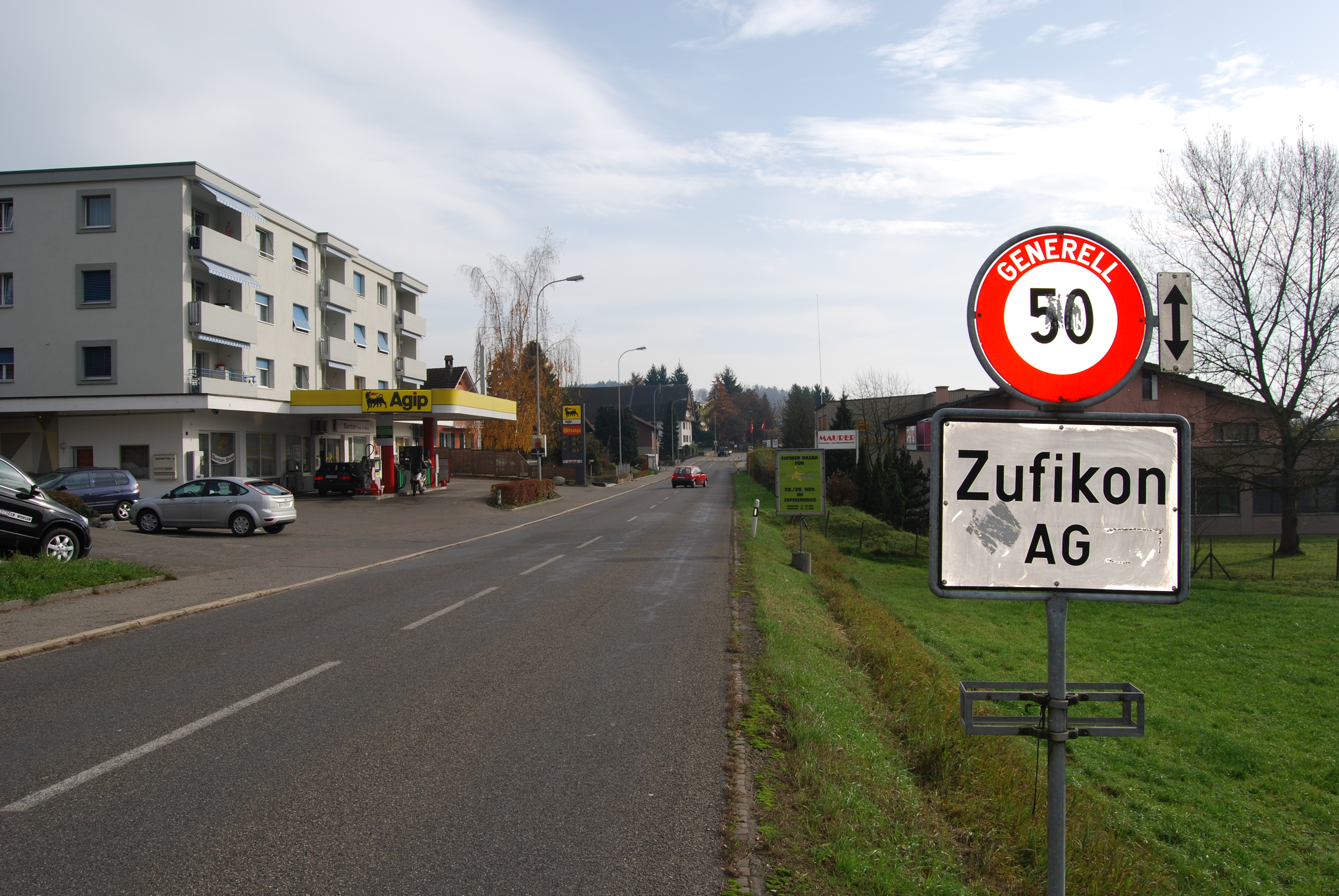

- Flag Coat of arms
- Location of Zufikon
- Location within Switzerland Location within Canton of Aargau
- Coordinates: 47°21′N 8°22′E
- Country: Switzerland
- Canton: Aargau
- District: Bremgarten

Area
  - Total: 4.8 km^{2} (1.9 sq mi)
- Elevation: 405 m (1,329 ft)

Population (December 2020)
  - Total: 4,548
  - Density: 950/km^{2} (2,500/sq mi)
- Time zone: UTC+01:00 (CET)
  - Summer (DST): UTC+02:00 (CEST)
- Postal code: 5621
- SFOS number: 4083
- ISO 3166 code: CH-AG
- Surrounded by: Berikon, Bremgarten, Eggenwil, Hermetschwil-Staffeln, Oberwil-Lieli, Unterlunkhofen, Widen
- Website: zufikon.ch

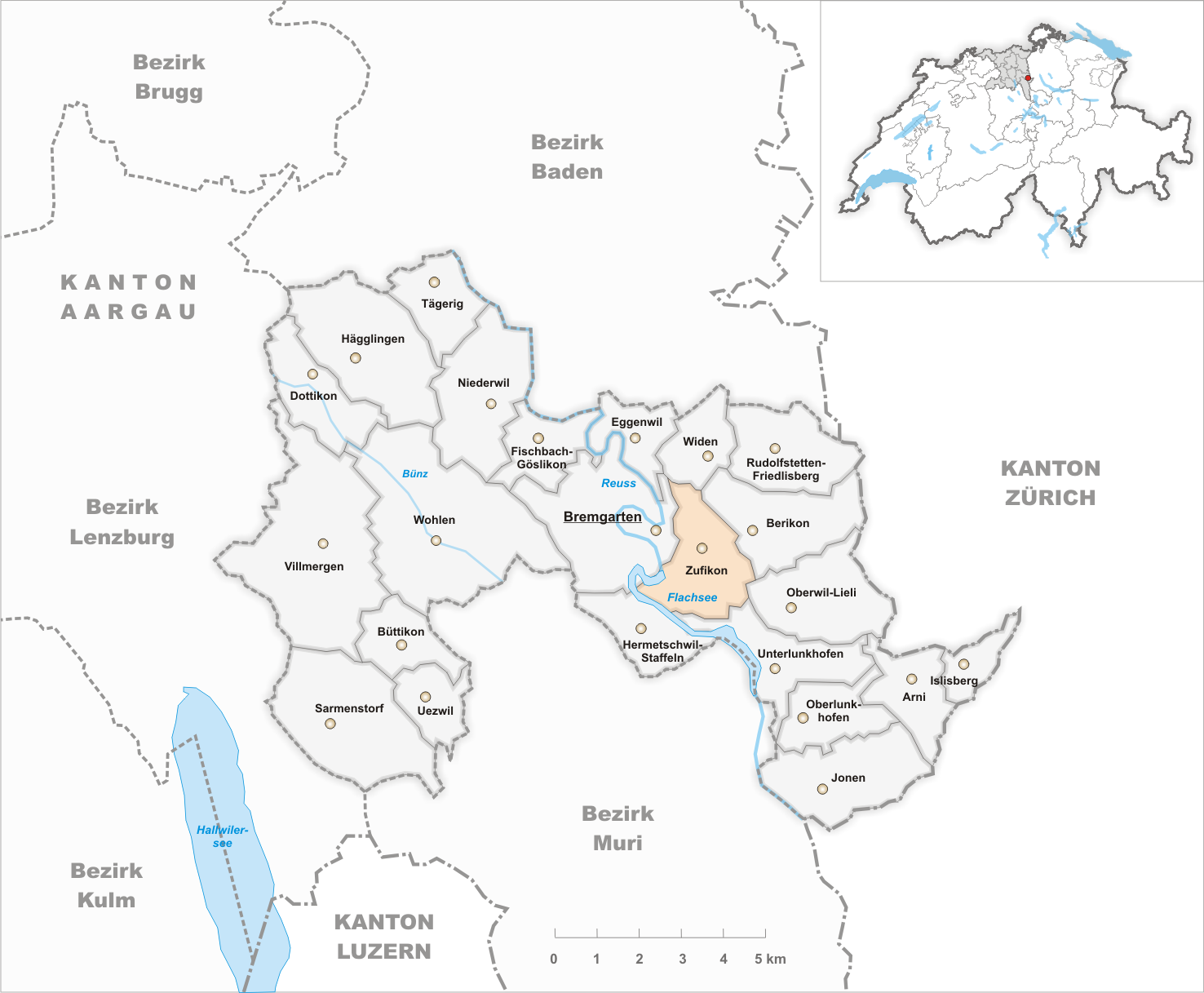
Zufikon

Zufikon is a municipality in the district of Bremgarten in the canton of Aargau in Switzerland.

== History ==
A single archeological find dates human habitation in the area to the Bronze Age. The first written reference to the village occurred in 1150.

== Geography ==
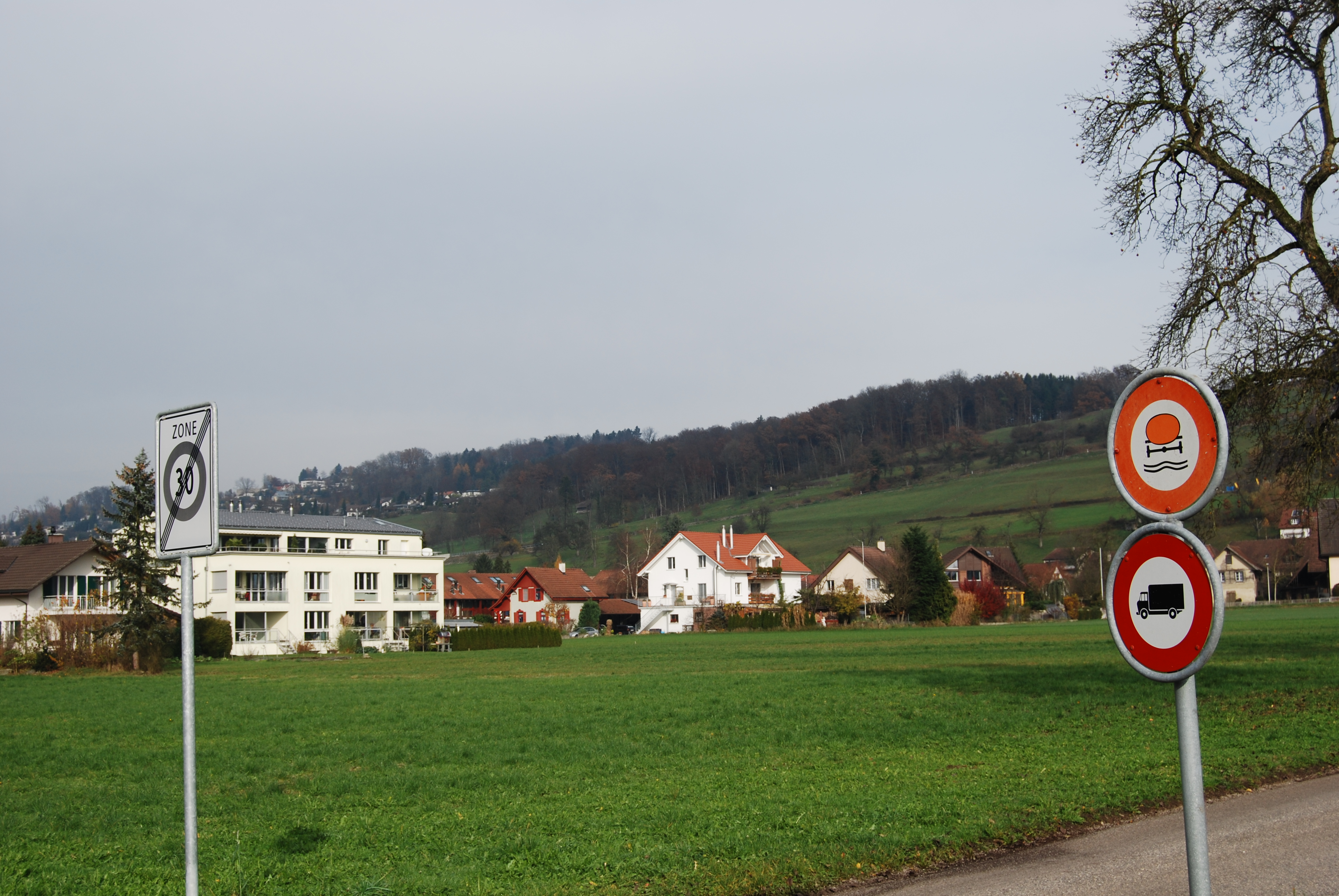
Zufikon village

Aerial view (1970)

Zufikon has an area, as of 2006, of 4.8 square kilometers (1.9 sq mi). Of this area, 49.9% is used for agricultural purposes, while 27.1% is forested. Of the rest of the land, 20.7% is settled (buildings or roads) and the remainder (2.3%) is non-productive (rivers or lakes).

== Coat of arms ==
The blazon of the municipal coat of arms is Argent a Pale Sable between two Keys palewise Azure with wards downwards and inwards.

== Demographics ==
Zufikon has a population (as of 31 December 2020) of 4,548. As of 2008, 17.4% of the population was made up of foreign nationals. Over the decade spanning 1997–2007, the population changed at a rate of 14.3%. Most of the population (as of 2000) speaks German (90.1%), with Italian being second most common ( 2.2%) and Turkish being third ( 1.5%).

The age distribution, as of 2008, in Zufikon is; 371 children or 9.3% of the population are between 0 and 9 years old and 463 teenagers or 11.7% are between 10 and 19. Of the adult population, 498 people or 12.5% of the population are between 20 and 29 years old. 558 people or 14.1% are between 30 and 39, 611 people or 15.4% are between 40 and 49, and 641 people or 16.1% are between 50 and 59. The senior population distribution is 486 people or 12.2% of the population are between 60 and 69 years old, 233 people or 5.9% are between 70 and 79, there are 100 people or 2.5% who are between 80 and 89, and there are 10 people or 0.3% who are 90 and older.

As of 2000, there were 134 homes with 1 or 2 persons in the household, 651 homes with 3 or 4 persons in the household, and 575 homes with 5 or more persons in the household. The average number of people per household was 2.48 individuals. In 2008 there were 625 single family homes (or 36.0% of the total) out of a total of 1,734 homes and apartments. There were a total of 19 empty apartments for a 1.1% vacancy rate. As of 2007, the construction rate of new housing units was 11.5 new units per 1000 residents.

In the 2007 federal election the most popular party was the SVP which received 35.9% of the vote. The next three most popular parties were the CVP (19%), the SP (15.4%) and the FDP (13.9%).

In Zufikon about 76.1% of the population (between age 25–64) have completed either non-mandatory upper secondary education or additional higher education (either university or a Fachhochschule). Of the school age population (in the 2008/2009 school year), there are 265 students attending primary school, there are 148 students attending secondary school in the municipality.

The historical population is given in the following table:

Historical population
Year	Pop.	±%
1975	1,951	—
1980	2,607	+33.6%
1990	3,528	+35.3%
2000	3,556	+0.8%

== Economy ==
As of 2007, Zufikon had an unemployment rate of 2.39%. As of 2005, there were 32 people employed in the primary economic sector and about 14 businesses involved in this sector. 141 people are employed in the secondary sector and there are 17 businesses in this sector. 579 people are employed in the tertiary sector, with 99 businesses in this sector.

As of 2000 there was a total of 1,944 workers who lived in the municipality. Of these, 1,649 or about 84.8% of the residents worked outside Zufikon while 398 people commuted into the municipality for work. There were a total of 693 jobs (of at least 6 hours per week) in the municipality. Of the working population, 17.8% used public transportation to get to work, and 53% used a private car.

== Religion ==
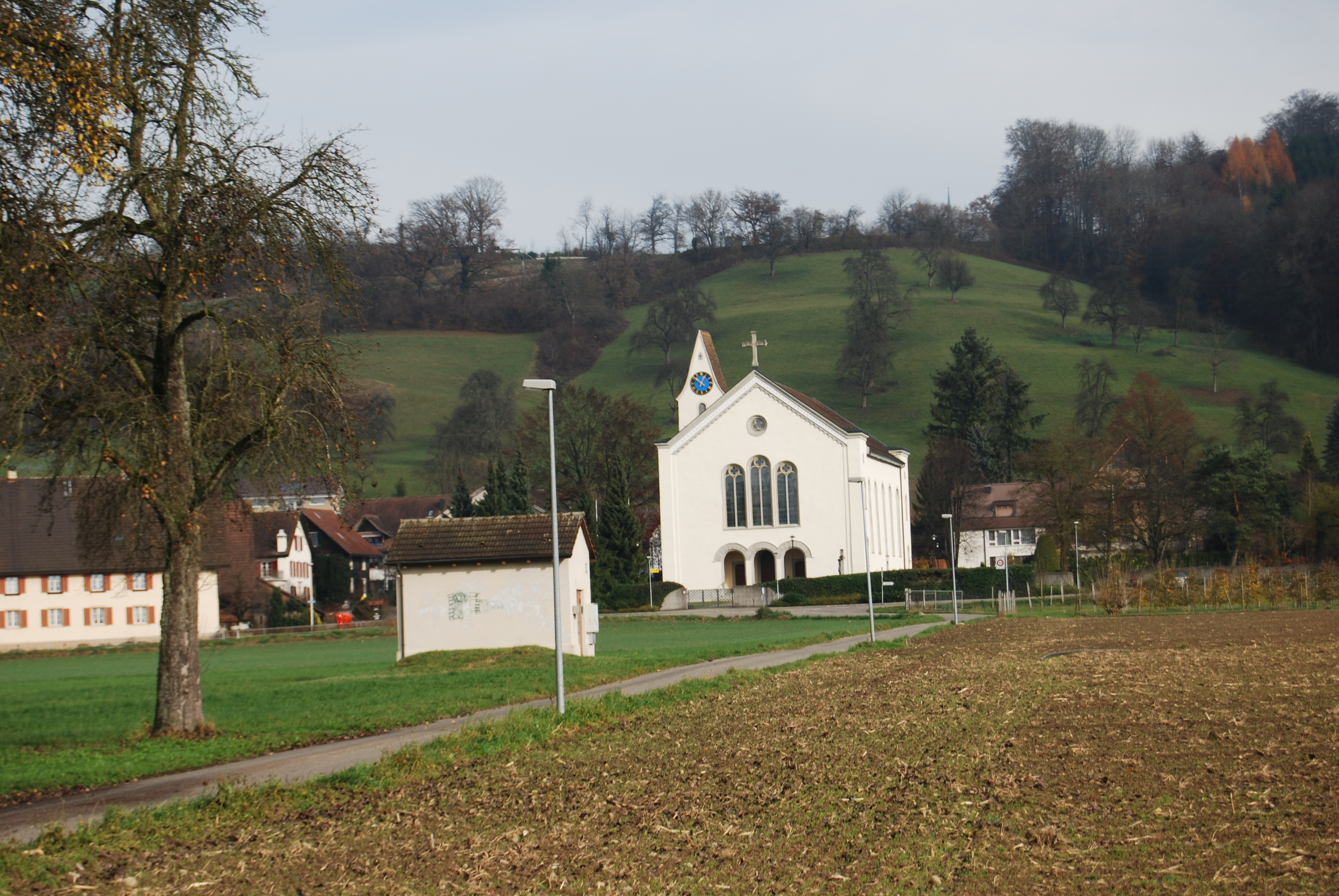
Village and church

From the 2000 census, 1,806 or 51.8% were Roman Catholic, while 1,009 or 28.9% belonged to the Swiss Reformed Church. Of the rest of the population, there was 1 individual who belonged to the Christian Catholic faith.

== Transportation ==
Zufikon is a stop of the S-Bahn Zürich on the line S17 provided by the Bremgarten-Dietikon-Bahn.
