= Rudolfstetten-Friedlisberg =

- Municipality
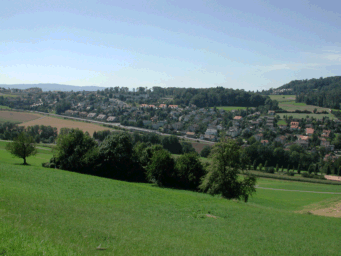

- Flag Coat of arms
- Location of Rudolfstetten-Friedlisberg
- Location within Switzerland Location within Canton of Aargau
- Coordinates: 47°22′N 8°23′E
- Country: Switzerland
- Canton: Aargau
- District: Bremgarten

Area
  - Total: 4.90 km^{2} (1.89 sq mi)
- Elevation: 494 m (1,621 ft)

Population (December 2020)
  - Total: 4,546
  - Density: 928/km^{2} (2,400/sq mi)
- Time zone: UTC+01:00 (CET)
  - Summer (DST): UTC+02:00 (CEST)
- Postal code: 8964
- SFOS number: 4075
- ISO 3166 code: CH-AG
- Surrounded by: Bergdietikon, Berikon, Birmensdorf (ZH), Urdorf (ZH), Widen
- Website: rudolfstetten.ch

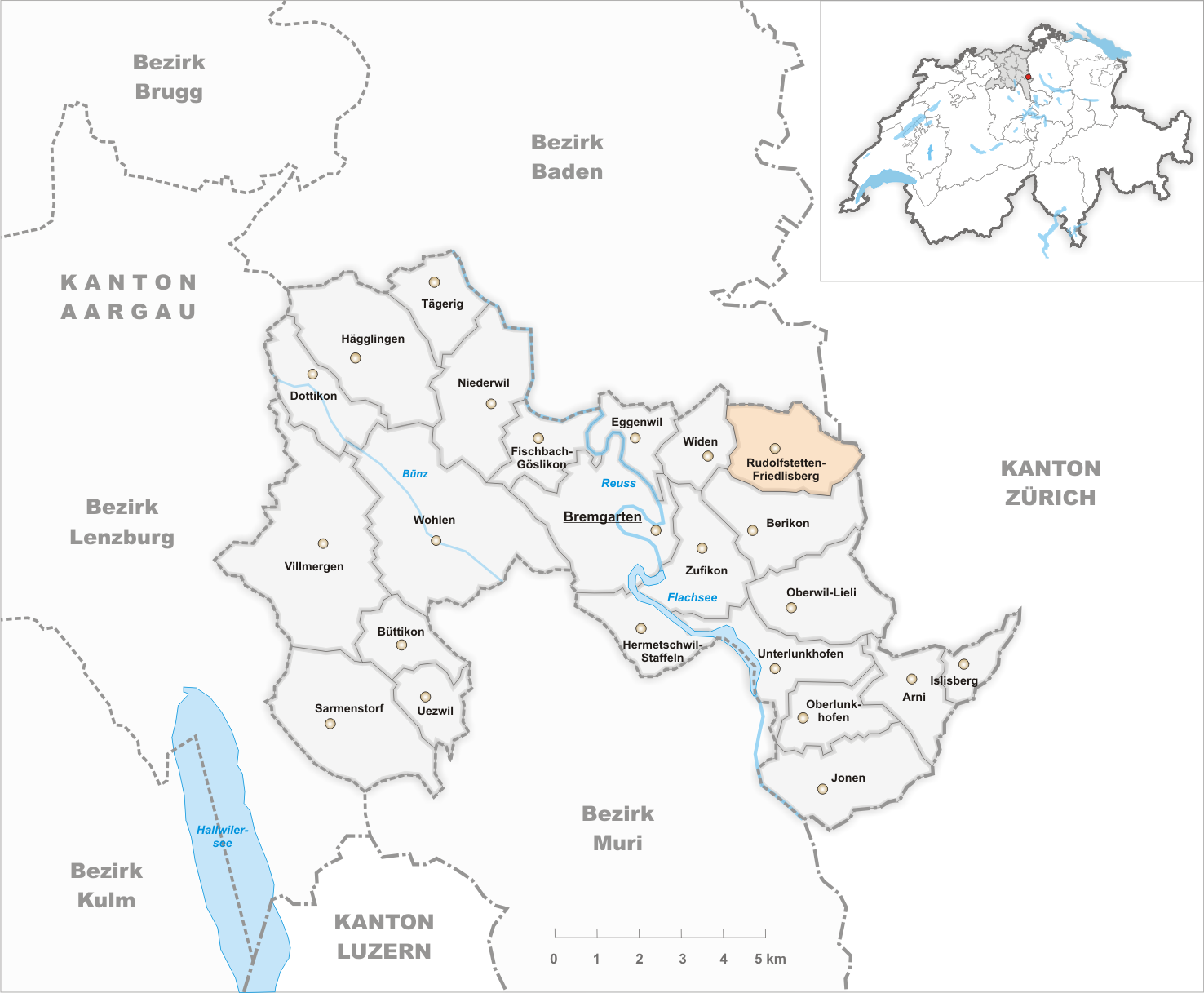
Rudolfstetten-Friedlisberg

Rudolfstetten-Friedlisberg is a municipality in the district of Bremgarten in the canton of Aargau in Switzerland. Prior to 1953, the municipality was officially known simply as Rudolfstetten.

== History ==
Aerial view (1959)

Rudolfstetten-Friedlisberg is first mentioned in 1190 as Rudolfstetin in a deed to the Benedictine Engelberg Abbey. In addition to Engelberg, Wettingen, Gnadenthal and St. Blasien Abbeys also owned property in the village. The village vogtei or bailiwick was an originally a Habsburg fief, though in the 14th century it transferred to the Schwendauer in Zürich. Then, in 1438 it went to Bremgarten.

Between 1415 and 1798 the village belonged to the county of Baden. During the short-lived Helvetic Republic it was part of the Canton of Baden from 1798 until 1803. Following the Act of Mediation it became part of the district of Bremgarten of Canton Aargau in 1803. In 1966 the municipalities of Rudolfstetten and Friedlisberg joined.

Religiously, until 1861 the Catholics were part of the Dietikon parish, then they became part of the Berikon. Friedlisberg remained in the parish Berikon, but in 1964 Rudolfstetten broke away and formed a parish with Bergdietikon. The two villages belong to the Reformed parish of Bremgarten-Mutschellen.

Rudolfstetten-Friedlisberg was an important stopping place on the road from the Reuss river over the Reppisch to the Limmat river. In 1902, the village was connected to Zurich by the Bremgarten-Dietikon electric tram line. After 1960, due to the favorable location, the municipality experienced rapid growth. As of 2000, 82% of the employed residents are commuters.

== Geography ==
Rudolfstetten-Friedlisberg has an area, as of 2006, of 4.9 square kilometers (1.9 sq mi). Of this area, 49.2% is used for agricultural purposes, while 28.1% is forested. Of the rest of the land, 22.5% is settled (buildings or roads) and the remainder (0.2%) is non-productive (rivers or lakes).

The municipality is located in the Bremgarten district. It consists of the village of Rudolfstetten and the hamlets of Friedlisberg.

== Coat of arms ==
The blazon of the municipal coat of arms is Per fess Or a Lion passant Sable armed and langued Gules and Gules two Keys in saltire Argent.

== Demographics ==
Rudolfstetten-Friedlisberg has a population (as of 31 December 2020) of 4,546. As of 2008, 21.7% of the population was made up of foreign nationals. Over the last 10 years (1997–2007) the population has changed at a rate of 4.8%. Most of the population (as of 2000) speaks German (87.4%), with Italian being second most common ( 4.0%) and Serbo-Croatian being third ( 2.1%).

The age distribution, as of 2008, in Rudolfstetten-Friedlisberg is; 430 children or 10.5% of the population are between 0 and 9 years old and 469 teenagers or 11.4% are between 10 and 19. Of the adult population, 547 people or 13.4% of the population are between 20 and 29 years old. 578 people or 14.1% are between 30 and 39, 698 people or 17.0% are between 40 and 49, and 561 people or 13.7% are between 50 and 59. The senior population distribution is 454 people or 11.1% of the population are between 60 and 69 years old, 272 people or 6.6% are between 70 and 79, there are 80 people or 2.0% who are between 80 and 89, and there are 8 people or 0.2% who are 90 and older.

As of 2000, there were 189 homes with 1 or 2 persons in the household, 884 homes with 3 or 4 persons in the household, and 496 homes with 5 or more persons in the household. The average number of people per household was 2.32 individuals. In 2008 there were 619 single family homes (or 33.0% of the total) out of a total of 1,876 homes and apartments. There were a total of 17 empty apartments for a 0.9% vacancy rate. As of 2007, the construction rate of new housing units was 6.8 new units per 1000 residents.

In the 2007 federal election the most popular party was the SVP which received 39.1% of the vote. The next three most popular parties were the SP (19.2%), the CVP (15.6%) and the FDP (11%).

In Rudolfstetten-Friedlisberg about 77.5% of the population (between age 25 and 64) have completed either non-mandatory upper secondary education or additional higher education (either university or a Fachhochschule). Of the school age population (in the 2008/2009 school year), there are 308 students attending primary school in the municipality.

The historical population is given in the following table:

Historical population
Year	Pop.	±%
1850	434	—
1900	438	+0.9%
1950	755	+72.4%
1970	2,384	+215.8%
2000	3,738	+56.8%

== Economy ==
As of 2007, Rudolfstetten-Friedlisberg had an unemployment rate of 2.68%. As of 2005, there were 23 people employed in the primary economic sector and about 11 businesses involved in this sector. 242 people are employed in the secondary sector and there are 43 businesses in this sector. 498 people are employed in the tertiary sector, with 120 businesses in this sector.

As of 2000 there was a total of 2,143 workers who lived in the municipality. Of these, 1,793 or about 83.7% of the residents worked outside Rudolfstetten-Friedlisberg while 488 people commuted into the municipality for work. There were a total of 838 jobs (of at least 6 hours per week) in the municipality. Of the working population, 21.8% used public transportation to get to work, and 54.6% used a private car.

== Religion ==
From the 2000 census, 1,731 or 46.3% were Roman Catholic, while 1,188 or 31.8% belonged to the Swiss Reformed Church. Of the rest of the population, there were 4 individuals (or about 0.11% of the population) who belonged to the Christian Catholic faith.
