= Heitersberg Pass =

Mountain pass in the canton of Aargau in Switzerland

Coordinates: 47°24′55″N 8°20′47″E

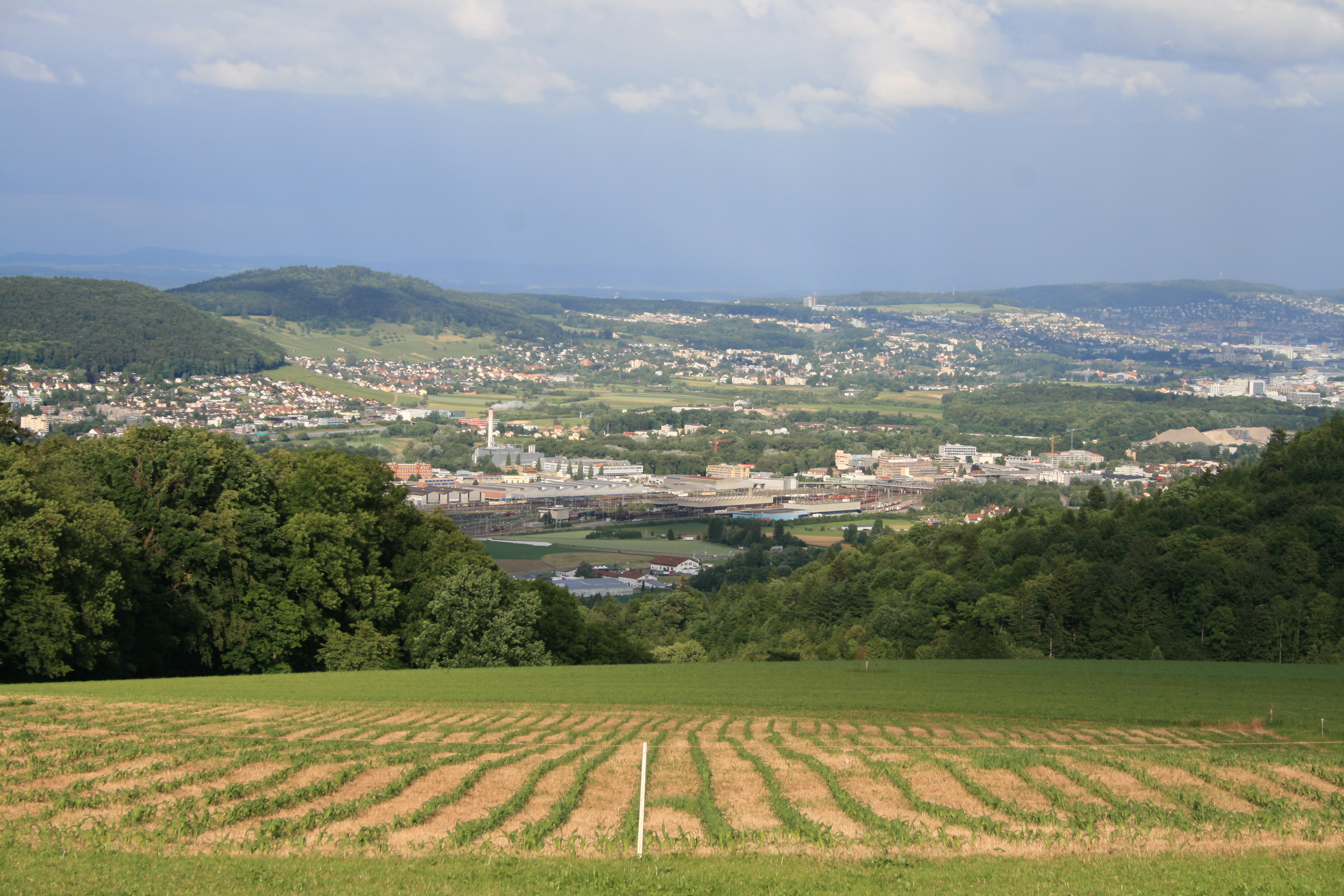
- View from Heitersberg Pass to Limmatvalley
- Interactive map of Heitersberg Pass
- Elevation: 657 metres (2,156 ft)

Third Approach
- Location: Switzerland

Heitersberg Pass (el. 657 m.) is a mountain pass in the canton of Aargau in Switzerland.

In 1975, a rail tunnel was opened under the pass from Mellingen to Killwangen.
