= 1986–87 FC Zürich season =

FC Zürich
1986–87 season
- Owner: Sven Hotz
- Chairman: Sven Hotz
- Head coach: Hermann Stessl
- Stadium: Letzigrund
- 1986–87 Nationalliga A: 6th of 16
- 1986–87 Swiss Cup: Round 3
- 1986 Intertoto Cup: 4th in the group
- Top goalscorer: League: Walter Pellegrini (14); All: Walter Pellegrini (16)

The 1986–87 season was FC Zürich's 90th season in their existence, since their foundation in 1896. It was their 28th consecutive season in the top flight of Swiss football, following their promotion at the end of the 1957–58 season. FCZ played their home games in the Letzigrund and the stadium is located in the west of Zurich in the district of Altstetten, which is about three kilometers from the city center.

== Overview ==
At the 1986 AGM local businessman Sven Hotz took over as chairman and patron of the club. Hotz was a trained bricklayer, initially worked as a cinema operator and then entered the construction and real estate industry, where he had entrepreneurial success with the property management company Sven Hotz AG. He had been vice-president for the previous two years. One of Hotz's first official acts was to employ a new head coach for the first team and he gave the Austrian Hermann Stessl a two-year contract. The FCZ first team competed in the domestic first-tier 1986–87 Nationalliga A and they competed in 1986–87 Swiss Cup. The team had not qualified for the UEFA European tournaments, but they entered the 1986 Intertoto Cup.

== Players ==
The following is the list of the FCZ first team squad this season. It also includes players that were in the squad the day the domestic league season started, on 9 August 1986, but subsequently left the club after that date.

Note: Flags indicate national team as defined under FIFA eligibility rules; some limited exceptions apply. Players may hold more than one non-FIFA nationality.

No.	Pos.	Nation	Player
1	GK	SUI	Karl Grob (league games: 23)
—	GK	SUI	Patrick Tornare (league games: 8)
—	DF	SUI	Urs Fischer (league games: 19)
—	DF	SUI	Roland Häusermann (league games: 14)
—	DF	SUI	Christian Hedinger (league games: 3)
—	DF	SUI	Ruedi Landolt (league games: 27)
—	DF	SUI	Heinz Lüdi (league games: 25)
—	DF	NZL	Shane Rufer (league games: 18)
—	DF	SUI	Peter Stoll (league games: 17)
—	MF	SUI	Thomas Bickel (league games: 29)
—	MF	CZE	Jan Berger (league games: 29)
—	MF	AUT	Andreas Gretschnig (league games: 20)

No.	Pos.	Nation	Player
—	MF	SUI	Urs Kühni (league games: 4)
—	MF	SUI	Roger Kundert (league games: 29)
—	MF	ITA	Marco Mautone (league games: 12)
—	MF	SUI	Salvatore Paradiso (league games: 4)
—	MF	SUI	Marcel Stoob (league games: 7)
—	MF	SUI	Jürg Studer (league games: 17)
—	FW	SUI	Massimo Alliata (league games: 20)
—	FW	SUI	Adilson de Almeida (league games: 3)
—	FW	SUI	Antonio Paradiso (league games: 2)
—	FW	SUI	Walter Pellegrini (league games: 27)
—	FW	ITA	Salvatore Romano (league games: 22)
—	FW	NZL	Wynton Rufer (league games: 5)

Players who left the squad

The following is the list of the FCZ first team players that left the squad during the previous season or in the off-season, before the new domestic season began.

Note: Flags indicate national team as defined under FIFA eligibility rules; some limited exceptions apply. Players may hold more than one non-FIFA nationality.

No.	Pos.	Nation	Player
—	DF	SUI	Thomas Hengartner (to St. Gallen)
—	DF	SUI	Urs Schönenberger (to Bellinzona)
—	MF	GER	Wolfgang Kraus (to Eintracht Frankfurt)
—	MF	SUI	Armin Krebs (to Baden)

No.	Pos.	Nation	Player
—	MF	ITA	David Mautone (to Grenchen)
—	MF	SUI	Markus Tanner (to Kriens)
—	FW	SUI	Markus Schneider (to Winterthur)
—	FW	SUI	Werner Schwaller (retired)

== Results ==
Legend

Win Draw Loss Postponed

=== Nationalliga A ===
The Swiss champions would qualify for the 1987–88 European Cup, the runners-up and third placed team would qualify for the 1987–88 UEFA Cup. The Swiss Football Association (ASF/SFV) had decided to reduce the size of the top tier NLA by four teams. The last two placed teams in the NLA would be directly relegated. The four teams in eleventh to fourteenth position would compete a play-out round with the top four teams of the NLB to decide the last two slots in next season's NLA.

==== League matches ====
9 August 1986 Round 1	Zürich	0–1	Grasshopper Club	Letzigrund, Zürich
20:00		FCZ summary	67' (0:1) Koller; (yellow card) De Siebenthal	Attendance: 15,800; Referee: (Switzerland) Bruno Galler (Kirchdorf, Bern and Untersiggenthal)

16 August 1986 Round 2	Zürich	4–0	Servette	Letzigrund, Zürich
20:00	Lüdi 35' (1:0); Pellegrini 60' (2:0); Alliata 63' (3:0); Pellegrini 70' (4:0)	FCZ summary		Attendance: 4,800; Referee: (Switzerland) Marco Raveglia (San Vittore)

23 August 1986 Round 3	Young Boys	1–1	Zürich	Wankdorf Stadium, Bern
17:30	Jeitziner (yellow card) 65'; Zuffi 83' (1:1)	FCZ summary	(yellow card) 40' Stoll; 59' (0:1) Rufer; (yellow card) 63' Kühni	Attendance: 8,000; Referee: (Switzerland) Freddy Philippoz, Sion

30 August 1986 Round 4	Zürich	2–0	Lausanne-Sport	Letzigrund, Zürich
17:30	Pellegrini 75' (1:0); Berger 83' (2:0)	FCZ summary		Attendance: 3,100; Referee: (Switzerland) Willy Hänni, (Cugy)

3 September 1986 Round 5	Basel	5–3	Zürich	St. Jakob Stadium, Basel
20:00	Maissen 35' (1:0); Nadig 57' (2:2); Mata 62' (3:2); Bützer (yellow card) 63'; Maissen (yellow card) 71'; Nadig 76' (4:2); Maissen 86' (5:3)	FCZ summary FCB summary	36' (1:1) Bickel; 55' (pen. 1:2) Bickel; 79' (4:3) Rufer	Attendance: 5,500; Referee: (Switzerland) Georges Sandoz (Corcelles-Cormondrèche and Neuchâtel)

6 September 1986 Round 6	Xamax	4–0	Zürich	Stade de la Maladière, Neuchâtel
	Thévenaz 20' (1:0); Sutter 54' (2:0) (Lüdi) 62' (o.g.); Hermann 67' (pen.); Urban (yellow card)	FCZ summary	(yellow card) Pellegrini; (yellow card) Stoob; (yellow card) Kundert	Attendance: 9.100; Referee: (Switzerland) Renzo Peduzzi (Roveredo)

13 September 1986 Round 7	Zürich	3–1	La Chaux-de-Fonds	Letzigrund, Zürich
17:30	Pellegrini 17' (1:0); Lüdi 62' (2:1); Bickel 84' (pen.)	FCZ summary	50' (1:1) Castro; (yellow card) Hohl; (yellow card) Paduano; (yellow card) Nogués	Attendance: 1,600; Referee: (Switzerland) Marco Raveglia (San Vittore)
Note: Only 1600 spectators despite free entry for standing places and a reduced price (CHF 12) for seats.

27 September 1986 Round 8	Aarau	1–1	Zürich	Stadion Brügglifeld, Aarau
17:30	Wassmer 78' (1:1); Schärer (yellow card)	FCZ summary FCA summary	31' (0:1) Alliata; (yellow card) Stoll	Attendance: 5,200; Referee: (Switzerland) Freddy Philippoz, Sion

4 October 1986 Round 9	Zürich	2–2	Bellinzona	Letzigrund, Zürich
17:30	Bickel 26' (pen.); Pellegrini 69' (2:2)	FCZ summary	24' (0:1) Bordoli; 29' (1:2) Paulo César; (yellow card) Schönenberger; (yellow card) Fargeon; (yellow card) Bordoli	Attendance: 5,000; Referee: (Switzerland) André Daina (Éclépens)
Note: Corners: 4:6.

8 October 1986 Round 10	Zürich	1–0	Sion	Letzigrund, Zürich
20:00	Stoob (yellow card) 66'; Romano 76' (1:0); Kundert (yellow card) 87'	FCZ summary	(yellow card) 41' Lopez; (yellow card) 77' Bonvin	Attendance: 5,900; Referee: (Switzerland) Philippe Mercier (Pully)

11 October 1986 Round 11	Wettingen	1–1	Zürich	Stadion Altenburg, Wettingen
20:00	Bertelsen 57' (1:0); Zbinden (yellow card)	FCZ summary	67' (1:1) Romano; (yellow card) Stoob	Attendance: 2,600; Referee: (Switzerland) Marco Raveglia (San Vittore)

25 October 1986 Round 12	Locarno	1–1	Zürich	Stadio del Lido, Locarno
20:00	Bachofner 72' (1:1); Fornera (yellow card)	FCZ summary	55' (0:1) Alliata; (yellow card) Kundert	Attendance: 2,800; Referee: (Switzerland) Kurt Röthlisberger (Aarau)

2 November 1986 Round 13	Zürich	3–2	St. Gallen	Letzigrund, Zürich
	Pellegrini 24' (1:1); Bickel 71' (pen.); Alliata 72' (3:2); Studer (yellow card); Landolt (yellow card)	FCZ summary	5' (0:1) Fregno; 64' (pen.) Hegi; (yellow card) Metzler	Attendance: 3,400; Referee: (Switzerland) André Reck (Birsfelden)

23 November 1986 Round 14	Vevey-Sports	1–1	Zürich	Stade de Copet, Vevey
14:30	Abega 75' (1:1)	FCZ summary	60' (0:1) Berger; (yellow card) Rufer; (yellow card) Pellegrini	Attendance: 1,850; Referee: (Switzerland) Manfred Schlup, (Grenchen)

30 November 1986 Round 15	Zürich	2–2	Luzern	Letzigrund, Zürich
14:30	Pellegrini 72' (1:2); Bickel 81' (pen. 2:2); Rufer (yellow card); Landolt (yellow card); Kundert (yellow card)	FCZ summary	24' (0:1) Grétarsson; 49' (0:2) Halter; (yellow card) Burri	Attendance: 5,400; Referee: (Switzerland) Marcel Despland (Yverdon-les-Bains)

1 March 1987 Round 16	Luzern	P–P	Zürich	Stadion Allmend, Luzern
		[ FCZ summary]		Referee: (Switzerland) Renzo Peduzzi (Roveredo)
Note: Postponed, due to an unplayable pitch.

8 March 1987 Round 17	Zürich	3–0	Vevey-Sports	Letzigrund, Zürich
17:30	Pellegrini 22' (1:0); Studer 72' (2:0); Landolt 90' (3:0)	FCZ summary		Attendance: 1,200; Referee: (Switzerland) Georges Sandoz (Corcelles-Cormondrèche and Neuchâtel)
Note: Goalkeeper Karl Grob was honored for 500 appearances in his 499th NLA match. The reason: The match the week before had to be cancelled due to an unplayable pitch and the club FCZ was determined to hold the ceremony at a home game.

15 March 1987 Round 18	St. Gallen	2–1	Zürich	Espenmoos, St. Gallen
14:30	Fregno 16' (1:0); Braschler 36' (2:0)	FCZ summary	56' (2:1) Pellegrini; (yellow card) 87' (yellow-red card) 87' Lüdi	Attendance: 6,000; Referee: (Switzerland) Rolf Blattmann (Zeiningen)
Note: In the 87th minute, Lüdi insulted the referee, calling him a «Lumpenschwein» ("rag pig,") according to the Newspaper Tagesanzeiger.

21 March 1987 Round 19	Zürich	1–0	Locarno	Letzigrund, Zürich
17:30	Studer 29' (1:0)	FCZ summary		Attendance: 1,200; Referee: (Switzerland) André Reck (Birsfelden)

29 March 1987 Round 22	Bellinzona	1–2	Zürich	Stadio Comunale, Bellinzona
14:30	Paulo César 9' (1:0)	FCZ summary	48' (1:1) Gretschnig; 75' (1:2) Alliata; (yellow card) 88' Grob	Attendance: 5,500; Referee: (Switzerland) Kurt Röthlisberger (Aarau)
Note: Fixture brought forward from 18 April.

1 April 1987 Round 16	Luzern	0–0	Zürich	Stadion Allmend, Luzern
20:00		FCZ summary	(yellow card) Häusermann; (yellow card) Landolt	Attendance: 6,700; Referee: (Switzerland) Renzo Peduzzi (Roveredo)
Note: Resheduled from 1 March.

5 April 1987 Round 20	Zürich	1–0	Wettingen	Letzigrund, Zürich
14:30	Pellegrini 80' (1:0); Studer (yellow card)	FCZ summary		Attendance: 3,800; Referee: (Switzerland) Charles-Henri Morex (Bex)

11 April 1987 Round 21	Sion	4–2	Zürich	Stade Tourbillon, Sion
20:00	Rojević 41' (1:1); Cina 56' (2:2); Brigger 75' (3:2); Bouderbala 85' (4:2); Brigger (yellow card)	FCZ summary	9' (0:1) Alliata; 54' (1:2) Bickel; (yellow card) Rufer; (yellow card) Lüdi; (yellow card) Bickel; (yellow card) Gretschnig	Attendance: 6,200; Referee: (Switzerland) Marco Raveglia (San Vittore)

25 April 1987 Round 23	Zürich	1–1	Aarau	Letzigrund, Zürich
17:30	Lüdi 65' (1:1)	FCZ summary FCA summary	56' (0:1) Schär	Attendance: 3,400; Referee: (Switzerland) Renzo Peduzzi (Roveredo)

2 May 1987 Round 24	La Chaux-de-Fonds	1–3	Zürich	Stade Charrière, La Chaux-de-Fonds
17:30	Béguin 6' (1:1)	FCZ summary	3' (0:1) Berger; 26' (1:2) Fischer; 71' (1:3) Lüdi	Attendance: 600; Referee: (Switzerland) Peter Bochsler (Basel)
Note: Corners 1:14

9 May 1987 Round 25	Zürich	2–2	Xamax	Letzigrund, Zürich
20:00	Pellegrini 6' (1:0); Pellegrini 80' (2:2)	FCZ summary	9' (1:1) Ben Haki; 71' (1:2) Lei-Ravello; (yellow card) Mottiez	Attendance: 8,500; Referee: (Switzerland) Bruno Galler (Kirchdorf, Bern and Untersiggenthal)

16 May 1987 Round 26	Zürich	3–2	Basel	Letzigrund, Zürich
20:00	Kundert 57' (1:2); Studer 67' (2:2); Lüdi 83' (3:2)	FCZ summary FCB summary	35' (0:1) Nadig; 39' (0:2) Strack (yellow card) 87' Bützer	Attendance: 3,300; Referee: (Switzerland) Philippe Mercier (Pully)

23 May 1987 Round 27	Lausanne-Sport	2–2	Zürich	Olympique de la Pontaise, Lausanne
20:00	Tachet 18' (1:0); Schürmann 58' (2:2)	FCZ summary	26' (1:1) Berger; 52' (1:2) Studer	Attendance: 3,500; Referee: (Switzerland) Kurt Röthlisberger (Aarau)

30 May 1987 Round 28	Zürich	4–1	Young Boys	Letzigrund, Zürich
20:00	Pellegrini 32' (1:0); Pellegrini 50' (2:0); Bickel 56' (3:0); Pellegrini (yellow card) 73'; Studer 80' (4:1)	FCZ summary	73' (3:1) Prytz	Attendance: 3,700; Referee: (Switzerland) Marcel Despland (Yverdon-les-Bains)

3 June 1987 Round 29	Servette	1–1	Zürich	Charmilles Stadium, Geneva
20:00	Decastel 61' (1:1)	FCZ summary	26' (0:1) Studer	Attendance: 2,500; Referee: (Switzerland) Bruno Galler (Kirchdorf, Bern and Untersiggenthal)

12 June 1987 Round 30	Grasshopper Club	5–1	Zürich	Hardturm, Zürich
20:00	Sforza 34' (1:0); Andermatt 40' (2:0); Koller 75' (3:1); Matthey 86' (4:1); Matthey 90' (5:1)	FCZ summary	(yellow card) 3' Kundert; 51' (2:1) Romano	Attendance: 5,000; Referee: (Switzerland) Philippe Mercier (Pully)

==== Final league table ====
Pos	Team	Pld	W	D	L	GF	GA	GD	Pts	Qualification
1	Xamax	30	21	6	3	75	27	+48	48	Swiss champions qualified for 1987–88 European Cup
2	Grasshopper Club	30	19	5	6	60	36	+24	43	qualified for 1987–88 UEFA Cup and entered 1987 Intertoto Cup
3	Sion	30	17	8	5	76	38	+38	42	qualified for 1987–88 UEFA Cup
4	Servette	30	16	4	10	65	44	+21	36	
5	Luzern	30	12	12	6	55	38	+17	36	
6	Zürich	30	12	12	6	52	44	+8	36	
7	St. Gallen	30	14	6	10	50	43	+7	34	
8	Lausanne-Sport	30	13	6	11	64	60	+4	32	entered 1987 Intertoto Cup
9	Bellinzona	30	10	11	9	42	39	+3	31	entered 1987 Intertoto Cup
10	Young Boys	30	10	8	12	47	45	+2	28	Swiss Cup winners qualified for 1987–88 Cup Winners' Cup
11	Aarau	30	9	8	13	37	42	−5	26	Play-out winners, remained in 1987–88 Nationalliga A
12	Basel	30	9	6	15	49	62	−13	24	Play-out winners, remained in 1987–88 Nationalliga A
13	Vevey Sports	30	6	8	16	31	72	−41	20	Play-out losers, relegated to 1987–88 Nationalliga B
14	Wettingen	30	6	7	17	31	48	−17	19	Play-out losers, relegated to 1987–88 Nationalliga B
15	Locarno	30	6	7	17	44	65	−21	19	Relegated to 1987–88 Nationalliga B
16	La Chaux-de-Fonds	30	1	4	25	22	97	−75	6	Relegated to 1987–88 Nationalliga B and entered 1987 Intertoto Cup

Source: rsssf.com
Rules for classification: 1) Points; 2) Goal difference; 3) Goals scored; 4) Head-to-head points; 5) Away goals scored; 6) Draw.

=== Swiss Cup ===
20 September 1986 Round 3	Mendrisio	5–3	Zürich	Stadio comunale Lido, Locarno
16:30	Trapletti 14' (1:2); Trapletti 16' (2:2); Sorci 37' (3:3); Mantilla 50' (4:3); Felappi 89' (5:3)	FCZ summary	9' (0:1) Pellegrini; 13' (0:2) Gretschnig; 34' (2:3) Pellegrini; (yellow card) 50' (yellow-red card) 87' Stoob; (red card) 90' Hermann Stessl (coach)	Attendance: 1,500; Referee: (Switzerland) Daniel Roduit (Sion)
Note: Mendrisio spielte 1986/87 season in der 1. Liga (third tier). 89th Minute: spectators storm the pitch, Lüdi scuffled with fans. Zurich filed a protest, claiming he was assaulted.

=== Intertoto Cup ===
==== Group 10 matches ====
21 June 1986 Matchday 1	IFK Göteborg (Sweden)	3–0	(Switzerland) Zürich	Varberg
	Fredriksson 15' (pen.); Larsson 33' (pen.); Mordt 37' (3:0)	FCZ summary	(red card) Lüdi; (yellow card) Kundert; (yellow card) Landolt	Attendance: 3,300; Referee: (Sweden) Rolf Eriksson

28 June 1986 Matchday 2	Sredets Sofia (Bulgaria)	2–0	(Switzerland) Zürich	Stadion Balgarska Armia, Sofia
	Tanev 11' (1:0); Stoichkov 49' (2:0)	FCZ summary	(yellow card) (yellow-red card) Kundert	Attendance: 3,000; Referee: (Bulgaria) Zontschew

5 July 1986 Matchday 3	Zürich (Switzerland)	3–1	(Bulgaria) Sredets Sofia	Sportplatz Ri-Au, Bad Ragaz
	Rufer 20' (1:0); Alliata 42' (2:0); Bickel 78' (pen.)	FCZ summary	56' (2:1) Tanev	Attendance: 900; Referee: (Switzerland) Willi Jaus (Feldmeilen)

9 July 1986 Matchday 4	Zürich (Switzerland)	2–2	(Czechoslovakia) Vítkovice	Sportplatz Rüti, Uzwil
	Rufer 43' (1:1); Bickel 73' (pen- 2:2); Landolt (yellow card)	FCZ summary	12' (0:1) Beles; 64' (1:2) Grussmann; (yellow card) Kovacik	Attendance: 950; Referee: (Switzerland) Renzo Peduzzi (Roveredo)

13 July 1986 Matchday 5	Vítkovice (Czechoslovakia)	2–1	(Switzerland) Zürich	Frýdek-Místek
	Bartl 34' (1:0); Beles 51' (2:0)	FCZ summary	85' (2:1) Romano; (yellow card) Lüdi	Attendance: 5,000; Referee: (Czechoslovakia) Jiří Jašek

19 July 1986 Matchday 6	Zürich (Switzerland)	2–3	(Sweden) IFK Göteborg	Letzigrund, Zürich
	Bickel 17' (1:0); Bickel 62' (2:3); Kundert (yellow card) 70'	FCZ summary	40' (1:1) Mordt; 47' (1:2) Ekström; 53' (1:3) Ekström; (yellow card) 77' Johansson)	Attendance: 1,350; Referee: (Switzerland) Werner Liebi (Thun)

==== Final group table ====
Pos	Team	Pld	W	D	L	GF	GA	GD	Pts	GÖT	VIT	CSK	ZÜR
1	(Sweden) IFK Göteborg	6	4	0	2	13	7	+6	8	—	5–0	1–0	3–0
2	(Czechoslovakia) Vítkovice	6	3	1	2	9	12	−3	7	3–1	—	1–3	2–1
3	(Bulgaria) Sredets Sofia	6	3	0	3	8	6	+2	6	2–0	0–1	—	2–0
4	(Switzerland) Zürich	6	1	1	4	8	13	−5	3	2–3	2–2	3–1	—

Source: mogiel.net
Rules for classification: 1) points; 2) goal difference; 3) number of goals scored.

=== Friendly matches ===
==== Pre- and mid-season ====
16 July 1986 Pre-season	Zürich	15–1	FC Albisrieden	Letzigrund trainings pitch, Zürich
	Rufer (1:0); Rufer (2:0); Rufer (3:0); Rufer (4:0); Romano (5:0); Romano (6:0); Romano (7:0); Pellegrini (8:0); Pellegrini (9:0); Bickel (10:0); Bickel (11:0); Berger (12:0); Berger (13:0); Stoob (14:0); Lüdi (15:0)	FCZ summary	(15:1)

23 July 1986 Exhibition game	Winterthur	2–2	Zürich	Schützenwiese, Winterthur
	Unseld 10' (1:0); Schneider 79' (2:2)	FCZ summary	33' (1:1) Pellegrini; 75' (1:2) de Almeida	Attendance: 400; Referee: (Switzerland) B. Neukom (Zürich)

26 July 1986 Exhibition game	Zürich	3–0	Kriens	Letzigrund, Zürich
	Alliata 24' (1:0); Pellegrini 62' (2:0); S. Paradiso 80' (3:0)	FCZ summary		Attendance: 350; Referee: (Switzerland) André Reck (Birsfelden)

30 July 1986 Exhibition game	Lugano	3–3	Zürich	Cornaredo, Lugano
	Jerković 27' (1:0); Elia 73' (2:3); Gross 88' (pen. 3:3)	FCZ summary	37' (1:1) Berger; 53' (1:2) Landolt; 70' (1:3) Kühni	Attendance: 500; Referee: (Switzerland) Papa (Agno)

2 August 1986 Exhibition game	Zürich	4–0	FC Stäfa	Letzigrund, Zürich
	Pellegrini 24' (1:0); Berger 77' (2:0); Pellegrini 83' (3:0); Berger 85' (4:0)	FCZ summary		Attendance: 500; Referee: (Switzerland) Kellenberger (Zollikon)

19 October 1986 Mid-season	FC Olten	0–5	Zürich	Sportanlagen Kleinholz, Olten
		FCZ summary	16' (0:1) Alliata; 52' (0:2) Romano; 55' (0:3) Alliata; 68' (0:4) Studer; 86' (0:5) Berger	Attendance: 350; Referee: (Switzerland) Serge Muhmenthaler (Grenchen)

8 November 1986 Exhibition game	Schaffhausen	3–4	Zürich	Stadion Breite, Schaffhausen
	Filomeno 6' (1:0); Dreher 41' (2:2); Küpfer 59' (3:4)	FCZ summary	17' (1:1) Studer; 33' (1:2) Fischer; 47' (2:3) Bickel; 53' (2:4) Studer	Attendance: 400; Referee: (Switzerland) Kellenberger (Zollikon)

16 November 1986 Exhibition game	Zürich	1–1	Wettingen	Letzigrund, Zürich
	Pellegrini 4' (1:0)	FCZ summary	19' (1:1) Friberg	Attendance: 300; Referee: (Switzerland) Karl Strässle (Steinach)

==== Winter break ====
22 January 1987 Exhibition game	Civitavecchia	1–2	Zürich	Stadio Comunale A. Elmi, Massa Marittima
	41' (1:1)	FCZ summary	29' (0:1) Studer; 71' (1:2) Bickel	Attendance: 4,000

23 January 1987 Exhibition game	Massese	1–2	Zürich	Stadio Comunale A. Elmi, Massa, Tuscany
	Goal	FCZ summary	35' (0:1) Pellegrini; 43' (0:2) Hedinger

25 January 1987 Exhibition game	Empoli	4–1	Zürich	Empoli
	Della Monica (pen.); Della Monica (pen.); Della Monica (pen.); Calonaci 53' (4:0)	FCZ summary	80' (pen. 4:1) Bickel	Attendance: 1,500

28 January 1987 Exhibition game	Zürich	3–0	Lugano	Stadio Comunale A. Elmi, Massa, Tuscany
	Bickel 8' (1:0); Kundert 49' (2:0); Alliata 73' (3:0)	FCZ summary

2 February 1987 Exhibition game	Zürich	1–0	Pfullendorf	Letzigrund trainings pitch, Zürich
	Goal	FCZ summary		Attendance: Played behind closed doors

8 February 1987 Exhibition game	Zürich	2–3	Biel-Bienne	Letzigrund trainings pitch, Zürich
	Stoob 13' (1:0); Alliata 53' (2:2)	FCZ summary	19' (1:1) Korus; 52' (1:2) Sollberger; 68' (2:3) Skov	Referee: (Switzerland) Manfred Schlup, (Grenchen)

15 February 1987 Exhibition game	Zürich	3–1	Schwarz-Weiss Bregenz	Letzigrund trainings pitch, Zürich
	Pellegrini (1:1); Pellegrini (2:1); Pellegrini (3:1); Alliata (4:1); Alliata (5:1); Berger (6:1)	FCZ summary	2' (0:1) Vögel	Attendance: 300; Referee: (Switzerland) Bruno Galler (Kirchdorf, Bern and Untersiggenthal)

15 February 1987 Exhibition game	Tuggen	1–4	Zürich	Linthstrasse, Tuggen
	Goal	FCZ summary	Pellegrini; Lüdi; Alliata; Romano

22 February 1987 Exhibition game	Chiasso	2–4	Zürich	Stadio Comunale Riva IV, Chiasso
	Goal	FCZ summary	Studer; Studer; Alliata; Bickel

3 March 1987 Exhibition game	Zürich	0–1	Schaffhausen	Juchhof I, Zürich
		FCZ summary	Goal

6 June 1987 Mid-season	FC Regensdorf	1–4	Zürich	Regensdorf
	Rindlisbacher 88' (1:4)	FCZ summary	8' (0:1) Rhiati; 26' (o.g.); 43' (0:3) Rufer; 56' (0:4) Pellegrini

== Sources ==
- dbFCZ Homepage
- Switzerland 1986–87 at RSSSF

Preceded by 1985–86	FC Zürich seasons	Succeeded by 1987–88
