= 1984–85 FC Zürich season =

FC Zürich
1984–85 season
- Owner: Hans Stanek
- Chairman: Hans Stanek
- Head coach: Václav Ježek
- Stadium: Letzigrund
- 1984–85 Nationalliga A: 7th
- 1984–85 Swiss Cup: Round 5
- 1984 Intertoto Cup: Group winners
- Top goalscorer: League: Massimo Alliata (14); All: Massimo Alliata (16)

The 1984–85 season was FC Zürich's 88th season in their existence, since their foundation in 1896. It was their 26th consecutive season in the top flight of Swiss football, following their promotion at the end of the 1957–58 season. FCZ played their home games in the Letzigrund and the stadium is located in the west of Zurich in the district of Altstetten, which is about three kilometers from the city center.

== Overview ==
The club's owner and chairman at this time had been Alfred Zweidler, but at the 1984 AGM he stood down and handed over to the local and successful business manager Hans Stanek. Stanek had been vice-chairman during the previous two years. The Czech Václav Ježek was appointed as new head-coach. He had previously been coach by Sparta Prague. FCZ first team competed in the domestic first-tier 1984–85 Nationalliga A and they also competed in 1984–85 Swiss Cup. The team had not qualified for any of the European tournaments, but they entered the 1984 Intertoto Cup.

== Players ==
The following is the list of the FCZ first team squad this season. It also includes players that were in the squad the day the domestic league season started, on 15 August 1984, but subsequently left the club after that date.

Note: Flags indicate national team as defined under FIFA eligibility rules; some limited exceptions apply. Players may hold more than one non-FIFA nationality.

No.	Pos.	Nation	Player
1	GK	SUI	Karl Grob (league games: 27)
—	GK	SUI	Patrick Tornare (league games: 4)
—	DF	SUI	Fritz Baur (league games: 28)
—	DF	SUI	Urs Fischer (league games: 23)
—	DF	SUI	Roland Häusermann (league games: 16)
—	DF	SUI	Thomas Hengartner (league games: 3)
—	DF	SUI	Ruedi Landolt (league games: 28)
—	DF	SUI	Heinz Lüdi (league games: 16)
—	DF	SUI	Urs Schönenberger (league games: 28)
—	DF	SUI	Peter Stoll (league games: 10)
—	MF	ITA	Roberto Di Muro (league games: 1)

No.	Pos.	Nation	Player
—	MF	YUG	Jurica Jerković (league games: 28)
—	MF	SUI	Roger Kundert (league games: 29)
—	MF	GER	Wolfgang Kraus (league games: 22)
—	MF	SUI	Armin Krebs (league games: 14)
—	MF	SUI	Salvatore Paradiso (league games: 1)
—	MF	SUI	Markus Tanner (league games: 14)
—	MF	ITA	David Mautone (league games: 16)
—	MF	ITA	Marco Mautone (league games: 3)
—	FW	SUI	Massimo Alliata (league games: 29)
—	FW	SUI	Antonio Paradiso (league games: 1)
—	FW	NZL	Wynton Rufer (league games: 22)
—	FW	SUI	Markus Schneider (league games: 30)

Players who left the squad

Note: Flags indicate national team as defined under FIFA eligibility rules; some limited exceptions apply. Players may hold more than one non-FIFA nationality.

No.	Pos.	Nation	Player
—	GK	SUI	Hermann Rufli (retired)
—	DF	GER	Gerhard Bold (to 1. FC Kaiserslautern)
—	DF	SUI	Gianpietro Zappa (to Lausanne-Sport)

No.	Pos.	Nation	Player
—	MF	SUI	Walter Iselin (to Aarau)
—	FW	SUI	Ruedi Elsener (to Neuchâtel Xamax)

== Results ==
Legend

Win Draw Loss Postponed

=== Nationalliga A ===
==== League matches ====
15 August 1984 Round 1	St. Gallen	4–0	Zürich	Espenmoos, St. Gallen
20:00	Christian Gross 16' (1:0); Zwicker 61' (2:0); Urban 67' (3:0); Braschler 72' (4:0)	FCZ summary	(yellow card) 78' Mautone	Attendance: 8,000; Referee: (Switzerland) Kurt Röthlisberger (Aarau)
Note: Karl Grob was honoured for his 450th Nationalliga A game

18 August 1984 Round 2	Zürich	2–1	Wettingen	Letzigrund, Zürich
20:00	Schneider 48' (1:0); Alliata 61' (2:0); Baur (yellow card) 73'	FCZ summary	(yellow card) Hüsser; 84' (2:1) Frei	Attendance: 3,400; Referee: (Switzerland) Philippe Mercier (Pully)

25 August 1984 Round 3	Xamax	5–2	Zürich	Stade de la Maladière, Neuchâtel
20:00	Nata 10' (1:0); Zaugg 16' (2:0); Perret 25' (3:0); Zaugg 30' (4:0); Lüthi 72' (5:1)	FCZ summary	58' (4:1) Alliata; (yellow card) 59' Jerković; (yellow card) 64'Rufer; 73' (5:2) Jerković; (yellow card) 80' Kundert	Attendance: 6,300; Referee: (Switzerland) Manfred Schlup, (Grenchen)

28 August 1984 Round 4	Zürich	1–0	Grasshopper Club	Letzigrund, Zürich
20:00	Alliata 9' (1:0); Kundert (yellow card)	FCZ summary	(yellow card) 36' Koller	Attendance: 10,300; Referee: (Switzerland) Jakob Baumann (Schaffhausen)

5 September 1984 Round 5	Sion	2–1	Zürich	Stade Tourbillon, Sion
20:15	Mauron 16' (1:0); Cina 42' (2:0)	FCZ summary	(yellow card) 35' Häusermann; 47' (2:1) Häusermann	Attendance: 4,200; Referee: (Switzerland) Ulrich Nyffenegger (Nidau)

12 September 1984 Round 6	Luzern	0–0	Zürich	Stadion Allmend, Luzern
20:00	Bernaschina (yellow card) 55'	FCZ summary	(yellow card) 20' Häusermann; (yellow card) 21' Landolt; (yellow card) 34' Schönenberger	Attendance: 5,600; Referee: (Switzerland) Claude Gachoud (Rolle)

29 September 1984 Round 7	Zürich	1–1	Servette	Letzigrund, Zürich
20:00	Rufer 35' (pen.); Schönenberger (yellow card) 44'; Kraus (yellow card) 53'; Grob (yellow card) 61'	FCZ summary	(yellow card) 54' Kok; 62' (1:1) Schnyder	Attendance: 7,800; Referee: (Switzerland) Jean-Marie Macheret, (Rueyres-St-Laurent)

6 October 1984 Round 8	Basel	1–1	Zürich	St. Jakob Stadium, Basel
17:30	Jeitziner (yellow card) 83'; Sutter 60' (1:0)	FCZ summary FCB summary	(yellow card) 11' Stoll; 90' (1:1) Alliata; (yellow card) 90' Rufer	Attendance: 4,500; Referee: (Switzerland) Francesco Bianchi (Chiasso)

10 October 1984 Round 9	Zürich	2–2	Lausanne-Sport	Letzigrund, Zürich
20:00	Rufer 35' (1:1); Rufer 47' (2:1)	FCZ summary	26' (0:1) Duc; (yellow card) 29' Kühni; (yellow card) 38' Seramondi; 54' (2:2) Andrey	Attendance: 3,900; Referee: (Switzerland) Rolf Blattmann (Zeiningen)

27 October 1984 Round 10	La Chaux-de-Fonds	3–2	Zürich	Stade Charrière, La Chaux-de-Fonds
18:30	Pavoni 13' (1:1); Pavoni 27' (2:2); Zwygart 71' (3:2)	FCZ summary	7' (0:1) Jerković; 20' (1:2) Alliata	Attendance: 3,100; Referee: (Switzerland) Alfred Heinis (Ammannsegg, Biberist)

11 November 1984 Round 11	Zürich	3–1	Young Boys	Letzigrund, Zürich
15:00	Kraus 12' (1:0); Rufer 23' (2:0); Kundert (43 pen. 3:0); Rufer (penalty missed) 45′ Kundert (yellow card) 58'	FCZ summary	(yellow card) 21' Ramsey; 58' (3:1) Weber	Attendance: 4,800; Referee: (Switzerland) Franz Gächter (Aarau, Suhr, Aargau)
Note: 45th minute: Zurbuchen held Rufer's penalty.

18 November 1984 Round 12	Aarau	1–1	Zürich	Stadion Brügglifeld, Aarau
15:00	Herbert (yellow card) 31'; Herbert 35' (1:1); Herbert (penalty missed) 65′ Kaltaveridis (yellow card) 87'; Granzotto (yellow card) 90'	FCZ summary FCA summary	21' (1:0) Alliata; (yellow card) 50' Schönenberger; (yellow card) 65' Baur; (yellow card) 75' Kraus; (yellow card) 75' Mautone	Attendance: 9,600; Referee: (Switzerland) Arturo Martino, (Neukirch an der Thur)
Note: 65th minute Grob saved Herberth's penalty.

25 November 1984 Round 13	Zürich	7–1	Winterthur	Letzigrund, Zürich
15:00	Rufer 8' (1:1); Kundert 11' (2:1); Kraus 44' (3:1); Alliata 55' (4:1); Schneider 71' (5:1); Rufer 88' (6:1); Rufer 90' (7:1)	FCZ summary	5' (0:1) Zuffi	Attendance: 3,500; Referee: (Switzerland) Georges Sandoz (Corcelles-Cormondrèche, Neuchâtel)

2 December 1984 Round 14	SC Zug	1–5	Zürich	Herti Allmend Stadion, Zug
15:00	Käser (yellow card) 66'; Killmaier 89' (pen.)	FCZ summary	8' (0:1) Schneider; 47' (0:2) Kraus; 48' (0:3) Rufer; 53' (0:4) Kraus; 80' (0:5) Schneider	Attendance: 3,700; Referee: (Switzerland) Claude Gachoud (Rolle)

9 December 1984 Round 15	Zürich	1–0	Vevey-Sports	Letzigrund, Zürich
15:00	Rufer 6' (1:0)	FCZ summary	(yellow card) 51' Gavillet; (yellow card) 70' Schürmann	Attendance: 3,500; Referee: (Switzerland) Francesco Bianchi (Chiasso)

3 March 1985 Round 16	Vevey-Sports	P–P	Zürich	Stade de Copet, Vevey
		[ FCZ summary]
Note: Match postponed due to snow, pitch unplayable

10 March 1985 Round 17	Zürich	6–2	SC Zug	Letzigrund, Zürich
15:00	Schneider 3' (1:0); Jerković 7' (2:0); Jerković 12' (3:0); Rufer 13' (4:0); Kundert 39' (pen.); Alliata 50' (6:1); Landolt (yellow card) 57'	FCZ summary	(yellow card) 22' Bauer; (penalty missed) 25′ Killmaier; 42' (5:1) Dünner; 78' (6:2) Killmaier	Attendance: 3,900; Referee: (Switzerland) Georges Sandoz (Corcelles-Cormondrèche, Neuchâtel)
Note: 25th minute Grob saved Killmaier's penalty.

13 March 1985 Round 16	Vevey-Sports	2–0	Zürich	Stade de Copet, Vevey
18:30	Sengör (yellow card) 23'; Cacciapaglia (yellow card) 29'; Schürmann 32' (1:0); Puippe (yellow card) 84'; Siwek 88' (2:0)	FCZ summary	(yellow card) 62' Schönenberger	Attendance: 2,000; Referee: (Switzerland) Robert Süess (Luzern and Meggen)
Note: Rescheduled from 3 March due to bad weather.

23 March 1985 Round 18	Winterthur	4–2	Zürich	Schützenwiese, Winterthur
17:30	Franz 18' (1:0); Chelos 35' (2:1); Egli 47' (3:1); Egli (yellow card); Franz 68' (4:1)	FCZ summary	27' (1:1) Alliata; (yellow card) 33' Landolt; (yellow card) 50' Lüdi; (yellow card) 56' Schneider; 71' (pen.) Kundert; (yellow card) 77' Grob	Attendance: 4,200; Referee: (Switzerland) Jakob Baumann (Schaffhausen)

31 March 1985 Round 19	Zürich	1–0	Aarau	Letzigrund, Zürich
16:00	Schönenberger 67' (1:0); Schneider (yellow card)	FCZ summary FCA summary	(yellow card) 56' Zahner	Attendance: 7,900; Referee: (Switzerland) Werner Liebi (Thun)

11 April 1985 Round 20	Young Boys	1–1	Zürich	Wankdorf Stadium, Bern
20:00	Schönenberger 36' (1:0)	FCZ summary	59' (1:1) Weber	Attendance: 5,300; Referee: (Switzerland) Arturo Martino, (Neukirch an der Thur)

21 April 1985 Round 21	Zürich	1–1	La Chaux-de-Fonds	Letzigrund, Zürich
16:00	Tanner 10' (1:0)	FCZ summary	19' (pen. 1:1) Zwygart	Attendance: 2,900; Referee: (Switzerland) Claude Gachoud (Rolle)

26 April 1985 Round 22	Lausanne-Sport	3–0	Zürich	Olympique de la Pontaise, Lausanne
20:00	Pellegrini 7' (1:0); Pellegrini 84' (2:0); Thychosen 88' (3:0)	FCZ summary	(yellow card) 58' Schönenberger	Attendance: 3,000; Referee: (Switzerland) Franz Gächter (Aarau, Suhr, Aargau)

23 May 1985 Round 23	Zürich	3–2	Basel	Letzigrund, Zürich
20:00	Landolt 10' (1:1); Alliata 24' (2:1); Baur (yellow card) 25'; Alliata 58' (3:1)	FCZ summary FCB summary	4' (0:1) Nadig; (yellow card) 55' Grossenbacher; 73' (3:2) Nadig	Attendance: 3,000; Referee: (Switzerland) Robert Süess (Luzern and Meggen)

11 May 1985 Round 24	Servette	2–1	Zürich	Charmilles Stadium, Geneva
20:30	Barberis 28' (1:0); Jaccard 59' (2:1)	FCZ summary	(yellow card) 27' Lüdi; 39' (1:1) Alliata	Attendance: 5,500; Referee: (Switzerland) Franz Gächter (Aarau, Suhr, Aargau)

19 May 1985 Round 25	Zürich	5–1	Luzern	Letzigrund, Zürich
16:00	Häusermann 37' (1:0); Alliata 62' (2:0); Schneider 67' (3:0); Kundert 68' (pen.); Jerković 82' (5:1)	FCZ summary	70' (4:1) Hegi	Attendance: 3,200; Referee: (Switzerland) André Daina (Éclépens)

24 May 1985 Round 26	Zürich	1–3	Sion	Letzigrund, Zürich
20:00	Jerković 9' (1:0); Häusermann (red card) 60'	FCZ summary	43' (1:1) Bouderbala; 53' (1:2) Cina; 62' (1:3) Sarrasin	Attendance: 2,800; Referee: (Switzerland) Rolf Blattmann (Zeiningen)
Note: In the 60th minute, Häusermann clearly shows the referee the middle finger, staight red card.

5 June 1985 Round 27	Grasshopper Club	2–2	Zürich	Hardturm, Zürich
20:00	Ponte 51' (1:1); Hermann 85' (2:2)	FCZ summary	28' (0:1) Landolt; (yellow card) 42' Kundert; (yellow card) 69' Kraus; 84' (1:2) Alliata	Attendance: 5,500; Referee: (Switzerland) Francesco Bianchi (Chiasso)
Note: Newspaper Sport, 7 June 1985: A minute's silence was observed for the victims of Brussels. At the start of the second half, objects were thrown onto the field by FCZ fans. Appeals from the announcer were to no avail.

8 June 1985 Round 28	Zürich	3–1	Xamax	Letzigrund, Zürich
20:00	Mautone (yellow card) 7'; Kundert 33' (pen.); Jerković (yellow card) 59'; Mautone 60' (2:1); Kundert 84' (pen.)	FCZ summary	(yellow card) 13' Elsener; 21' (0:1) Küffer	Attendance: 2,600; Referee: (Switzerland) Franz Gächter (Aarau, Suhr, Aargau)

15 June 1985 Round 29	Wettingen	3–3	Zürich	Stadion Altenburg, Wettingen
20:00	Roth 19' (1:0) (Lüdi) 57' (o.g.) (Lüdi) 84' (o.g.)	FCZ summary	78' (2:1) Jerković; 80' (2:2) Tanner; 88' (3:3) Tanner	Attendance: 1,700; Referee: (Switzerland) Jean-Claude Tagliabue (Sierre)
Note: Following his two own goals, Lüdi hits the post with a back pass shortly before the end.

19 June 1985 Round 30	Zürich	1–2	St. Gallen	Letzigrund, Zürich
	Schönenberger 29' (1:0)	FCZ summary	33' (1:1) Braschler; 46' (1:2) Urban	Attendance: 5,700; Referee: (Switzerland) Renzo Peduzzi (Roveredo)

==== Final league table ====
Pos	Team	Pld	W	D	L	GF	GA	GD	Pts	Qualification
1	Servette	30	19	8	3	71	28	+43	46	Swiss Champions qualified for 1985–86 European Cup
2	Aarau	30	16	10	4	62	43	+19	42	Swiss Cup winners qualified for 1985–86 Cup Winners' Cup and entered 1985 Intertoto Cup
3	Xamax	30	14	11	5	59	34	+25	39	Qualified for 1985–86 UEFA Cup
4	St. Gallen	30	13	11	6	66	32	+34	37	Qualified for 1985–86 UEFA Cup and entered 1985 Intertoto Cup
5	Sion	30	14	8	8	56	49	+7	36	Entered 1985 Intertoto Cup
6	Grasshopper Club	30	11	10	9	53	47	+6	32	
7	Zürich	30	11	9	10	59	52	+7	31	
8	Basel	30	11	9	10	46	49	−3	31	
9	Young Boys	30	10	10	10	42	45	−3	30	Entered 1985 Intertoto Cup
10	Lausanne-Sport	30	10	9	11	50	57	−7	29	
11	Wettingen	30	7	12	11	31	35	−4	26	
12	Luzern	30	9	8	13	33	53	−20	26	
13	Vevey-Sports	30	9	6	15	40	47	−7	24	
14	La Chaux-de-Fonds	30	6	12	12	41	54	−13	24	
15	SC Zug	30	4	6	20	27	71	−44	14	Relegated to 1985–86 Nationalliga B
16	Winterthur	30	4	5	21	32	72	−40	13	Relegated to 1985–86 Nationalliga B

Source: rsssf.com
Rules for classification: 1) Points; 2) Goal difference; 3) Goals scored; 4) Head-to-head points; 5) Away goals scored; 6) Draw.

=== Swiss Cup ===
15 September 1984 Round 3	Bellinzona	0–4	Zürich	Stadio Comunale, Bellinzona
20:00	Ostini (yellow card) 32'; Rossini (yellow card) 38'	FCZ summary	40' (0:1) Rufer; (yellow card) 44' Schönenberger; 86' (0:2) Rufer; 89' (0:3) Rufer; 90' (0:4) Jerković	Attendance: 800; Referee: (Switzerland) Gottlieb Barmettler (Oberrieden and Luzern)

21 October 1984 Round 4	SC Zug	2–3	Zürich	Herti Allmend Stadion, Zug
	Killmaier 8' (1:0); Kok 21' (2:0); Börlin (yellow card) 88'	FCZ summary	36' (2:1) Schneider; 42' (o.g.) Marin; 90+2' (2:3) Häusermann	Attendance: 3,450; Referee: (Switzerland) Bruno Galler (Kirchdorf, Bern)

17 March 1985 Round 5	Grenchen	2–1 (a.e.t.)	Zürich	Stadium Brühl, Grenchen
14:30	Baur 8' (1:0); Röthlisberger (yellow card) 15'; Born (yellow card) 54'; Röthlisberger 95' (2:1); Reich (yellow card) 117'	FCZ summary	19' (1:1) Tanner; (yellow card) 45' Kundert; (yellow card) 109' Schönenberger; (yellow card) 120' Grob	Attendance: 2,700; Referee: (Switzerland) Arturo Martino (Neukirch an der Thur)
Note: Deep terrain, heavy snowfall, side-lines no longer visible in the second half.

=== Intertoto Cup ===
==== Group 9 matches ====
30 June 1984 Round 1	Spartak Trnava (Czechoslovakia)	2–0	(Switzerland) Zürich	Trnava
	Fijalka 25' (1:0); Cabánik 56' (2:0)	FCZ summary		Attendance: 4,000; Referee: (Czechoslovakia) Valach

7 July 1984 Round 2	Austria Klagenfurt	1–2	(Switzerland) Zürich	Wörthersee Stadion, Klagenfurt
	Bürgler 19' (pen. 1:1)	FCZ summary	15' (0:1) Schneider; 85' (1:2) Alliata; (yellow card) Baur; (yellow card) Lüdi	Attendance: 1,200; Referee: (Austria) Gerhard Kapl

14 July 1984 Round 3	Ferencváros (Hungary)	3–0	(Switzerland) Zürich	Üllői úti Stadion, Budapest
	Rab 35' (1:0); Zsinka 64' (2:0); Rubold 79' (3:0)	FCZ summary	(yellow card) Jerković	Attendance: 10,000; Referee: (Hungary) László Kőrös

21 July 1984 Round 4	Zürich (Switzerland)	1–0	(Hungary) Ferencváros	Linthstrasse, Tuggen
	Rufer 80' (1:0)	FCZ summary	(yellow card) 54' Zsivótzky	Attendance: 1,600; Referee: (Switzerland) Franz Gächter (Aarau, Suhr, Aargau)
Note: Inauguration of the Linthstrasse sports field.

28 July 1984 Round 5	Zürich (Switzerland)	2–0	Austria Klagenfurt	Sportplatz Rüti, Uzwil
	Schneider 63' (1:0); Alliata 67' (2:0); Landolt (yellow card)	FCZ summary	63′ D. Hrstic; (yellow card) P. Hrstic	Attendance: 1,100; Referee: (Switzerland) Philippe Mercier (Pully)

4 August 1984 Round 6	Zürich (Switzerland)	2–1	(Czechoslovakia) Spartak Trnava	Löhracker, Aadorf
	Jerković 44' (1:0); Schneider 64' (2:1)	FCZ summary	59' (1:1) Dian; (red card) 69' Martinak; (red card) 64' Šimo	Attendance: 950; Referee: (Switzerland) Bruno Galler (Kirchdorf, Bern)
Note: Game as part of the 50th anniversary celebrations of SC Aadorf

==== Final group table ====
Pos	Team	Pld	W	D	L	GF	GA	GD	Pts	ZÜR	TRV	FER	KLA
1	(Switzerland) Zürich	6	4	0	2	7	7	0	8	—	2–1	1–0	2–0
2	(Czechoslovakia) Spartak Trnava	6	3	1	2	12	9	+3	7	2–0	—	1–1	3–1
3	(Hungary) Ferencváros	6	2	2	2	9	6	+3	6	3–0	3–1	—	0–0
4	Austria Klagenfurt	6	1	1	4	7	13	−6	3	1–2	2–4	3–2	—

Source: mogiel.net
Rules for classification: 1) Points; 2) Goal difference; 3) Head-to-head points; 4) Head-to-head goals; 5) Draw.

=== Friendly matches ===
==== Pre- and mid-season ====
11 July 1984 Pre-season	Baar	0–5	Zürich
		FCZ summary	Goal	Attendance: Played behind closed doors

25 July 1984 Exhibition game	Baden	1–3	Zürich	Scharten, Baden
	Hadewicz (yellow card) 62'; Ceccaroni 79' (1:2)	FCZ summary	43' (0:1) Alliata; 66' (0:2) Häusermann; 81' (1:3) Rufer	Attendance: 400; Referee: (Switzerland) Franz Gächter (Aarau, Suhr, Aargau)

29 July 1984 Exhibition game	SC Pfullendorf	1–1	Zürich	Pfullendorf, Germany
	Guhl 36' (1:0)	FCZ summary	68' (1:1) Häusermann	Attendance: 550; Referee: (Switzerland) Harry Ehing (Welschingen, Deutschland)
Note: Pfullendorf played in the Oberliga in 1984

31 July 1984 Exhibition game	Zürich	4–0	ŠK Slovan Bratislava	Frohberg, Stäfa
	Schneider 26' (1:0); Rufer 35' (2:0); Schneider 48' (3:0); Krebs 74' (4:0)	FCZ summary		Attendance: 600; Referee: (Switzerland) Willi Jaus (Feldmeilen)

7 August 1984 Exhibition game	Zürich	3–1	St. Gallen	Letzigrund, Zürich
	Alliata 20' (1:1); Jerković 44' (2:1); Mautone 69' (3:1)	FCZ summary	3' (0:1) Fimian	Attendance: 5,000; Referee: (Switzerland) Jakob Schönenberger (Zürich)

9 August 1984 Exhibition game	Aarau	5–3	Zürich	Zofingen
	Herberth 34' (1:1); Fregno 52' (2:1); Seiler 62' (3:1); Fregno 70' (4:2); Herberth 72' (5:2); Fregno (yellow card)	FCZ summary	5' (0:1) Rufer; 65' (3:2) Mautone; 88' (5:3) Schneider; (yellow card) Lüdi	Attendance: 700; Referee: (Switzerland) Rolf Blattmann (Zeiningen)

2 September 1984 Mid-season	Kriens	1–7	Zürich	Stadion Kleinfeld, Kriens
	Mathis 64' (1:4)	FCZ summary	26' (0:1) Jerković; 31' (0:2) Alliata; 34' (0:3) Alliata; 60' (0:4) Di Muro; 65' (1:5) Paradiso; 67' (1:6) Mautone; 79' (1:7) Jerković	Attendance: 100; Referee: (Switzerland) Roland Gnägi (Gossau)

10 September 1984 Exhibition game	FC Einsiedeln	2–3	Zürich	Einsiedeln
	Kälin 5' (1:0); Kälin 44' (2:2)	FCZ summary	30' (1:1) Schneider; 39' (1:2) Kraus; 86' (2:3) Rufer	Attendance: 850; Referee: (Switzerland) Ludwig Zurkinden (Zell, Zürich)

18 September 1984 Exhibition game	FC Dübendorf	0–3	Zürich	Wangen-Brüttisellen
		FCZ summary	5' (0:1) Rufer; 64' (0:2) Schneider; 84' (0:3) Häusermann	Attendance: 400; Referee: (Switzerland) B. Neukom (Zürich)

16 October 1984 Exhibition game	Zürich	8–1	FC Blue Stars Zürich	Letzigrund Trainingsground, Zürich
	Di Muro; Mautone; Mautone; Fischer; Schneider; Landolt; Jerković; Häusermann	FCZ summary	Goal	Attendance: Played behind closed doors

23 October 1984 Exhibition game	FC Stäfa	1–5	Zürich	Sportanlage Frohberg, Stäfa
	Weinem 7' (1:0)	FCZ summary	31' (1:1) Schneider; 38' (1:2) Rufer; 59' (1:3) Rufer; 79' (1:4) Rufer; 89' (1:5) Jerković	Attendance: 400; Referee: (Switzerland) Jakob Schönenberger (Zürich)

31 October 1984 Exhibition game	FC Gossau	1–6	Zürich
	Jakovljev 71' (1:5)	FCZ summary	10' (0:1) Rufer; 23' (o.g.); 26' (0:3) Alliata; 42' (0:4) Rufer; 51' (0:5) Schneider; 78' (1:6) Krebs

6 November 1984 Exhibition game	FC Bremgarten	1–2	Zürich	Bärenmatt Bremgarten
	Peterhans 73' (1:1)	FCZ summary	8' (0:1) Schönenberger; 88' (1:2) Schneider	Attendance: 400; Referee: (Switzerland) B. Neukom (Zürich)

20 November 1984 Exhibition game	FC Küsnacht	1–12	Zürich	Küsnacht
	Spiess 57' (1:5)	FCZ summary	3' (0:1) Kundert; 34' (0:2) Schneider; 35' (0:3) Krebs; 49' (0:4) Abédi Pelé; 53' (0:5) Jerković; 60' (1:6) Schönenberger; 67' (1:7) Schönenberger; 76' (1:8) Kraus; 79' (1:9) Jerković; 81' (1:10) Rufer; 82' (1:11) Rufer; 89' (1:12) Abédi Pelé	Attendance: 400; Referee: (Switzerland) B. Neukom (Zürich)

==== Winter break ====
30 January 1985 Winter break	Hamrun Spartans F.C.	1–1	Zürich	Attard, Malta
	Refalo 37' (1:1)	FCZ summary	18' (0:1) Lüdi; (red card) Lüdi	Attendance: 1,200; Referee: (Malta) Marco Borg
Note: Match as part of the training camp in Malta.

3 February 1985 Exhibition game	Malta	1–2	Zürich	National Stadium, Ta' Qali, Attard
	Mizzi 80' (1:2)	FCZ summary	27' (0:1) Rufer; 41' (0:2) Schneider; (yellow card) Jerković; (yellow card) Lüdi	Attendance: 1,000; Referee: (Malta) Victor Mintoff

9 February 1985 Exhibition game	FC Laufen	1–3	Zürich	Sportplatz Nau, Laufen
	Dreher 20' (1:0)	FCZ summary	55' (1:1) Di Muro; 66' (1:2) Alliata; 74' (1:3) Alliata	Referee: (Switzerland) Rolf Blattmann (Zeiningen)

12 February 1985 Exhibition game	Qatar SC	1–2	Zürich	Khalifa, Doha, Qatar
	Bakhid 3' (1:0)	FCZ summary	33' (1:1) Kundert; 49' (1:2) Rufer	Attendance: 100

14 February 1985 Exhibition game	Qatar national team	2–1	Zürich	Khalifa, Doha, Qatar
	Al-Khater 7' (1:0); Muftah 59' (2:0)	FCZ summary	82' (2:1) Rufer; (yellow card) Schönenberger; (yellow card) Landolt	Attendance: 100; Referee: (Qatar) Mohamed Al-Mulla
Note: Over 100,000 people watched the game live on television.

17 Februar 1985 Exhibition game	Japan national team	0–0	Zürich	Ajinomoto Field Nishigaoka, Kita, Tokyo
		FCZ summary		Attendance: 4,000; Referee: (Japan) Toshikazu Sano

19 February 1985 Exhibition game	Japan (University national team)	1–4	Zürich	Ajinomoto Field Nishigaoka, Kita, Tokyo
	Mochizuki 84' (1:3)	FCZ summary	45' (0:1) Rufer; 47' (0:2) Rufer; 76' (0:3) Tanner; 85' (1:4) Schneider	Attendance: 1,000; Referee: (Japan) Toshikazu Sano

21 February 1985 Exhibition game	Maharashtra stateteam	0–5	Zürich	Cooperage Ground, Nariman Point, Mumbai
		FCZ summary	Lüdi; 60' (0:2) Kundert; Jerković; 70' (0:4) Kundert; 74' (0:5) Schneider

2 March 1985 Exhibition game	Zürich	5–1	Schaffhausen	Letzigrund Trainingsground, Zürich
	Kraus 44' (1:1); Schneider 56' (2:1); Krebs 64' (3:1); Krebs 81' (4:1); Alliata 86' (5:1)	FCZ summary	26' (0:1) Medenica	Attendance: Played behind closed doors Referee: (Switzerland) Bürki, (Zürich)

4 March 1985 Exhibition game	Zürich	0–3	St. Gallen	Letzigrund Trainingsground, Zürich
		FCZ summary	16' (0:1) Jurkemik; 73' (0:2) Friberg; 75' (0:3) Fimian	Attendance: Played behind closed doors Referee: (Switzerland) Jakob Schönenberger (Zürich)
Note: Playing 3x 30 Minuten

26 March 1985 Mid-season	Zürich	1–3	Blue Stars	Letzigrund Trainingsground, Zürich
	Goal	FCZ summary	Goal	Attendance: Played behind closed doors

31 March 1985 Mid-season	SC Brühl	0–2	Zürich	Paul-Grüninger-Stadion, St. Gallen
		FCZ summary	28' (0:1) Krebs; 67' (0:2) Krebs	Referee: (Switzerland) Marino Paggiola (Appenzell)
Note: Transfer match for Thomas Hengartner

6 April 1985 Mid-season	BSC Old Boys	2–2	Zürich	Stadion Schützenmatte, Basel
	58' (1:0); 60' (2:0)	FCZ summary	82' (2:1) Mautone; 82' (o.g.)	Referee: (Switzerland) Francis Fischer (Arch)

16 April 1985 Mid-season	Red Star	0–3	Zürich	Allmend Brunau, Zürich
		FCZ summary	(0:1) Tanner (0:2) Schneider (0:3) Tanner	Attendance: Played behind closed doors

14 May 1985 Mid-season	FC Brüttisellen	1–3	Zürich	Lindenbuck, Wangen-Brüttisellen
	Unternährer 29' (1:1)	FCZ summary	23' (0:1) Schneider; 48' (1:2) Kundert; 69' (pen.) Kundert	Attendance: Played behind closed doors

== Sources ==
- dbFCZ Homepage
- Switzerland 1984–85 at RSSSF

Preceded by 1983–84	FC Zürich seasons	Succeeded by 1985–86
