= 1985–86 FC Zürich season =

FC Zürich
1985–86 season
- Owner: Hans Stanek
- Chairman: Hans Stanek
- Head coach: Václav Ježek
- Stadium: Letzigrund
- 1985–86 Nationalliga A: 4th
- 1985–86 Swiss Cup: Round 4
- 1985 Intertoto Cup: 4th in the group
- Top goalscorer: League: Wynton Rufer (14); All: Wynton Rufer (16)

The 1985–86 season was FC Zürich's 89th season in their existence, since their foundation in 1896. It was their 27th consecutive season in the top flight of Swiss football, following their promotion at the end of the 1957–58 season. FCZ played their home games in the Letzigrund and the stadium is located in the west of Zurich in the district of Altstetten, which is about three kilometers from the city center.

== Overview ==
The club's owner and chairman at this time was the local business manager Hans Stanek. Sven Hotz, further local businessman, served as his vize-president and he was designated to take over and become owner and chairman at the 1986 AGM. The Czech Václav Ježek had been appointed as head-coach for the previous season and Ježek continued in this position for his second year. The FCZ first team competed in the domestic first-tier 1985–86 Nationalliga A and they competed in 1985–86 Swiss Cup. The team had not qualified for the UEFA European tournaments, but they entered the 1985 Intertoto Cup.

== Players ==
The following is the list of the FCZ first team squad this season. It also includes players that were in the squad the day the domestic league season started, on 7 August 1985, but subsequently left the club after that date.

Note: Flags indicate national team as defined under FIFA eligibility rules; some limited exceptions apply. Players may hold more than one non-FIFA nationality.

| No. | Pos. | Nation | Player |
|---|---|---|---|
| 1 | GK | SUI | Karl Grob (league games: 14) |
| — | GK | SUI | Patrick Tornare (league games: 17) |
| — | DF | SUI | Urs Fischer (league games: 6) |
| — | DF | SUI | Roland Häusermann (league games: 20) |
| — | DF | SUI | Thomas Hengartner (league games: 0) |
| — | DF | SUI | Ruedi Landolt (league games: 30) |
| — | DF | SUI | Heinz Lüdi (league games: 29) |
| — | DF | NZL | Shane Rufer (league games: 18) |
| — | DF | SUI | Urs Schönenberger (league games: 16) |
| — | DF | SUI | Peter Stoll (league games: 16) |
| — | MF | SUI | Thomas Bickel (league games: 30) |
| — | MF | AUT | Andreas Gretschnig (league games: 25) |
| — | MF | GER | Wolfgang Kraus (league games: 15) |

| No. | Pos. | Nation | Player |
|---|---|---|---|
| — | MF | SUI | Armin Krebs (league games: 2) |
| — | MF | SUI | Urs Kühni (league games: 19) |
| — | MF | SUI | Roger Kundert (league games: 27) |
| — | MF | ITA | David Mautone (league games: 0) |
| — | MF | ITA | Marco Mautone (league games: 7) |
| — | MF | SUI | Salvatore Paradiso (league games: 0) |
| — | MF | SUI | Markus Tanner (league games: 2) |
| — | FW | SUI | Massimo Alliata (league games: 21) |
| — | FW | SUI | Antonio Paradiso (league games: 2) |
| — | FW | ITA | Salvatore Romano (league games: 6) |
| — | FW | NZL | Wynton Rufer (league games: 28) |
| — | FW | SUI | Markus Schneider (league games: 26) |
| — | FW | SUI | Werner Schwaller (league games: 6) |

Players who left the squad

Note: Flags indicate national team as defined under FIFA eligibility rules; some limited exceptions apply. Players may hold more than one non-FIFA nationality.

| No. | Pos. | Nation | Player |
|---|---|---|---|
| — | DF | SUI | Fritz Baur (to Wettingen) |
| — | MF | ITA | Roberto Di Muro (to Baden) |

| No. | Pos. | Nation | Player |
|---|---|---|---|
| — | MF | YUG | Jurica Jerković (to Lugano) |

== Results ==
Legend

Win Draw Loss Postponed

=== Nationalliga A ===
==== League matches ====
| 7 August 1985 Round 1 | Zürich | 0–0 | Young Boys | Letzigrund, Zürich |
| 20:00 | | FCZ summary | (yellow card) Siwek; (yellow card) Weber; (yellow card) Wittwer | Attendance: 5,000; Referee: (Switzerland) Manfred Schlup, (Grenchen) |

| 10 August 1985 Round 2 | Wettingen | 2–1 | Zürich | Stadion Altenburg, Wettingen |
| 20:00 | Dupovac 30' (pen.); Frei 44' (2:1) | FCZ summary | 19' (0:1) Kraus; (yellow card) Landolt; (yellow card) Kundert | Attendance: 4,200; Referee: (Switzerland) Werner Liebi (Thun) |

| 17 August 1985 Round 3 | Zürich | 4–0 | La Chaux-de-Fonds | Letzigrund, Zürich |
| 20:00 | Rufer 16' (1:0); Rufer 21' (2:0); Gretschnig 30' (3:0); Bickel 66' (4:0) | FCZ summary | | Attendance: 2,200; Referee: (Switzerland) Marco Raveglia (San Vittore) |

| 20 August 1985 Round 4 | Sion | 1–1 | Zürich | Stade Tourbillon, Sion |
| 20:15 | Lüdi 89' (o.g.); Brigger (yellow card); Alvaro Lopez (yellow card) | FCZ summary | 57' (0:1) Alliata; (yellow card) Kühni; (yellow card) Kundert | Attendance: 7,500; Referee: (Switzerland) Kurt Röthlisberger (Aarau) |
Note: Corners: 15:0

| 24 August 1985 Round 5 | Zürich | 1–0 | Basel | Letzigrund, Zürich |
| 20:00 | Bickel 90' (1:0) | FCZ summary FCB summary | (yellow card) 27' Botteron; (yellow card) 34' Hauser; (yellow card) 81' Süss; (yellow card) 90' Suter; (yellow card) 90+1' Schällibaum | Attendance: 6,200; Referee: (Switzerland) Walter Nussbaumer (Crans-près-Céligny) |
Note: National coach Paul Wolfisberg commented on the match to the Tages-Anzeiger with the following words: “I almost fell asleep.”

| 31 August 1985 Round 6 | Xamax | 9–1 | Zürich | Stade de la Maladière, Neuchâtel |
| 20:00 | Jacobacci 1' (1:0); Perret 29' (2:0); Lüthi 35' (3:0); Perret 50' (4:0); Küffer (penalty missed) 55′ Mottiez 55' (5:0); Lüthi 67' (6:0); Lüthi 70' (7:0); Lüthi 73' (8:0); Mottiez 90' (9:0); Givens (yellow card) | FCZ summary | 79' (pen.) Kundert | Attendance: 10,100; Referee: (Switzerland) Arturo Martino, (Neukirch an der Thur) |
Note: 55 minute: Küffer shot the penalty against the crossbar, Mottiez scored from the rebound.

| 4 September 1985 Round 7 | Zürich | 2–2 | Grasshopper Club | Letzigrund, Zürich |
| 20:00 | Lüdi 50' (1:2); Kundert 57' (2:2); Lüdi (yellow card); Kundert (yellow card); Bickel (yellow card) | FCZ summary | 1' (0:1) Matthey; 42' (0:2) Matthey; (yellow card) In-Albon | Attendance: 10,800; Referee: (Switzerland) Alfred Heinis (Ammannsegg, (Biberist)) |

| 14 September 1985 Round 8 | Grenchen | 1–8 | Zürich | Stadion Brühl, Grenchen |
| 20:00 | Zaugg 64' (1:6) | FCZ summary | 4' (0:1) Schneider; 19' (0:2) Gretschnig; 35' (0:3) Schneider; 55' (0:4) Rufer; 60' (0:5) Schneider; 62' (0:6) Rufer; 71' (1:7) Häusermann; 79' (1:8) Lüdi | Attendance: 6,000; Referee: (Switzerland) Philippe Mercier (Pully) |

| 29 September 1985 Round 9 | Zürich | 2–3 | Lausanne-Sport | Letzigrund, Zürich |
| 15:00 | Häusermann 5' (1:0); Rufer 39' (2:2) | FCZ summary | 8' (1:1) Ruchat; 23' (1:2) Thychosen; 90' (pen.) Thychosen | Attendance: 4,100; Referee: (Switzerland) Jean-Claude Tagliabue (Siders) |

| 16 October 1985 Round 10 | Servette | 1–2 | Zürich | Charmilles Stadium, Geneva |
| 20:00 | Schnyder 44' (1:1) | FCZ summary | (yellow card) 18' Häusermann; 34' (0:1) Alliata; 53' (1:2) Gretschnig; (yellow card) 63' Kundert | Attendance: 4,800; Referee: (Switzerland) Franz Gächter (Aarau, Suhr, Aargau) |

| 20 October 1985 Round 11 | Baden | 0–2 | Zürich | Scharten, Wettingen |
| 14:30 | | FCZ summary | 57' (o.g.) (Meier); 85' (0:2) Kundert | Attendance: 2,200; Referee: (Switzerland) Manfred Schlup, (Grenchen) |

| 26 October 1985 Round 12 | Zürich | 2–0 | Vevey-Sports | Letzigrund, Zürich |
| 17:30 | Gretschnig 6' (1:0); Kundert 67' (pen.) | FCZ summary | | Attendance: 1,500; Referee: (Switzerland) Arturo Martino, (Neukirch an der Thur) |
Note: Shane and Wynton Rufer both joined the New Zealand national team without permission. Upon their return, they were fined CHF 3,000 and CHF 5,000 respectively, and their salaries were reduced accordingly.

| 3 November 1985 Round 13 | Aarau | 3–3 | Zürich | Stadion Brügglifeld, Aarau |
| 15:00 | Herberth 4' (1:1); Zwahlen 14' (2:1); Herberth 48' (pen.) | FCZ summary | 2' (0:1) Bickel; 17' (2:2) Gretschnig; 30' (2:3) Schneider; (yellow card) Schönenberger; (yellow card) Kundert | Attendance: 8,200; Referee: (Switzerland) Walter Nussbaumer (Crans-près-Céligny) |

| 17 November 1985 Round 14 | Zürich | 1–0 | St. Gallen | Letzigrund, Zürich |
| 15:00 | Rufer 37' (1:0); Lüdi (yellow card) | FCZ summary | (yellow card) Urban; (yellow card) Braschler; (yellow card) Taddei | Attendance: 3,700; Referee: (Switzerland) André Daina (Éclépens) |
Note: Austria's national coach Branko Elsner in the stands.

| 24 November 1985 Round 15 | Luzern | 3–0 | Zürich | Stadion Allmend, Luzern |
| 14:30 | Torfason 13' (1:0); Halter 45' (2:0); Hegi (penalty missed) 75′ Grétarsson 89' (3:0) | FCZ summary | (yellow card) Mautone | Attendance: 7,000; Referee: (Germany) Siegfried Brehm |

| 2 March 1986 Round 16 | Zürich | P–P | Luzern | Letzigrund, Zürich |
| | | [ FCZ summary] | | Referee: (Switzerland) Arturo Martino, (Neukirch an der Thur) |

| 9 March 1986 Round 17 | St. Gallen | 1–1 | Zürich | Espenmoos, St. Gallen |
| 15:00 | Braschler 7' (1:0) | FCZ summary | 51' (1:1) Rufer | Attendance: 5,500; Referee: (Switzerland) Bruno Galler (Kirchdorf, Bern and Untersiggenthal) |

| 16 March 1986 Round 18 | Zürich | 0–2 | Aarau | Letzigrund, Zürich |
| 15:00 | Kundert (yellow card) 16'; Kraus (yellow card) 25' | FCZ summary | 31' (0:1) Wassmer; 44' (0:2) Fregno; (yellow card) 54' Küng | Attendance: 4,800; Referee: (Switzerland) Manfred Schlup, (Grenchen) |

| 23 March 1986 Round 19 | Vevey-Sports | 2–4 | Zürich | Stade de Copet, Vevey |
| 14:30 | Pavoni 15' (1:0); Patrick Biselx 87' (2:4) | FCZ summary | 29' (1:1) Kühni; 30' (1:2) Gretschnig; 48' (1:3) Schneider; 80' (1:4) Gretschnig | Attendance: 1,500; Referee: (Switzerland) Franz Gächter (Aarau, Suhr, Aargau) |

| 26 March 1986 Round 16 | Zürich | 1–1 | Luzern | Letzigrund, Zürich |
| 20:00 | Gretschnig 35' (1:1) | FCZ summary | 35' (0:1) Halter | Attendance: 5,100; Referee: (Switzerland) Arturo Martino, (Neukirch an der Thur) |
Note: Rescheduled from 2 March

| 5 April 1986 Round 20 | Zürich | 8–0 | Baden | Letzigrund, Zürich |
| 17:30 | Kundert 25' (pen.); Alliata 32' (2:0); Rufer 61' (3:0); Kraus 64' (4:0); Rufer 67' (5:0); Schneider 78' (6:0); Kundert 79' (7:0); Alliata 82' (8:0); Rufer (yellow card) | FCZ summary | (yellow card) Thorbjörnsson | Attendance: 800; Referee: (Switzerland) Claude Gachoud (Rolle) |

| 12 April 1986 Round 21 | Zürich | 3–0 | Servette | Letzigrund, Zürich |
| 17:30 | Kundert (penalty missed) 2′ Kundert 2' (1:0); Kundert 13' (2:0); Kühni 66' (3:0) | FCZ summary | (yellow card) Hasler | Attendance: 3,600; Referee: (Switzerland) Georges Sandoz (Corcelles-Cormondrèche and Neuchâtel) |
Note: Terrain difficult to play on (snow and mud). 2nd minute: Kundert converts the penalty on the rebound.

| 19 April 1986 Round 22 | Lausanne-Sport | 5–2 | Zürich | Olympique de la Pontaise, Lausanne |
| 20:15 | Seramondi 32' (1:1); Zappa 63' (2:1); Thychosen 69' (3:1); El Haddaoui 83' (4:1); Bernard Brodard 89' (5:1) | FCZ summary | 2' (0:1) Landolt; 90' (5:2) Rufer | Attendance: 2,500; Referee: (Switzerland) Werner Liebi (Thun) |

| 26 April 1986 Round 23 | Zürich | 2–1 | Grenchen | Letzigrund, Zürich |
| 17:30 | Gretschnig 14' (1:0); Rufer (yellow card) 49'; Alliata 67' (2:1) | FCZ summary | 20' (1:1) Michelberger | Attendance: 1,450; Referee: (Switzerland) Roland Gnägi (Gossau) |

| 29 April 1986 Round 24 | Grasshopper Club | P–P | Zürich | Hardturm, Zürich |
| | | [ FCZ summary] |

| 3 May 1986 Round 25 | Zürich | 0–0 | Xamax | Letzigrund, Zürich |
| 20:30 | | FCZ summary | | Attendance: 6,800; Referee: (Switzerland) André Daina (Éclépens) |

| 10 May 1986 Round 26 | Basel | 3–3 | Zürich | St. Jakob Stadium, Basel |
| 17:30 | Botteron (penalty missed) 11′ Maissen 13' (1:1); Nadig 19' (2:1); Nadig 78' (3:3); Mata (yellow card) | FCZ summary Summary | 5' (0:1) Rufer; 40' (2:2) Alliata; 43' (2:3) Alliata; (yellow card) Kraus | Attendance: 2,600; Referee: (Switzerland) Freddy Philippoz, Sion |

| 10 May 1986 Round 27 | Zürich | 3–1 | Sion | Letzigrund, Zürich |
| 20:00 | Rufer 6' (1:0); Romano 47' (2:1); Kraus (yellow card); Bickel (yellow card) 73'; Gretschnig 79' (3:1) | FCZ summary | 23' (1:1) Paul Brantschen; (red card) 75' Balet | Attendance: 2,800; Referee: (Switzerland) Francesco Bianchi (Chiasso) |

| 16 May 1986 Round 28 | La Chaux-de-Fonds | 0–0 | Zürich | Stade Charrière, La Chaux-de-Fonds |
| 20:00 | | FCZ summary | | Attendance: 900; Referee: (Switzerland) Werner Liebi (Thun) |

| 20 May 1986 Round 24 | Grasshopper Club | 1–3 | Zürich | Hardturm, Zürich |
| | Sulser 89' (1:3); In-Albon (yellow card) | FCZ summary | 36' (pen.) Kundert; 59' (0:2) Gretschnig; 73' (0:3) Rufer | Attendance: 8,500; Referee: (Switzerland) Bruno Galler (Kirchdorf, Bern and Untersiggenthal) |
Note: Rescheduled from 29 April.

| 24 May 1986 Round 29 | Zürich | 2–0 | Wettingen | Letzigrund, Zürich |
| 20:00 | Kundert 80' (1:0); Rufer 89' (2:0) | FCZ summary | (yellow card) 41' Hächler; (yellow card) 55' Dupovac; (yellow card) 89' Baur | Attendance: 2,800; Referee: (Switzerland) Marco Raveglia (San Vittore) |
Note: Killmaier's 72nd minute goal for Wettingenwas wrongly disallowed.

| 27 May 1986 Round 30 | Young Boys | 1–2 | Zürich | Wankdorf Stadium, Bern |
| 20:00 | Zuffi 23' (1:1) | FCZ summary | 22' (0:1) Romano; 29' (1:2) Kundert | Attendance: 18,500; Referee: (Switzerland) Franz Gächter (Aarau, Suhr, Aargau) |
Note: After the game, the Young Boys were presented with the championship trophy.

==== Final league table ====
| Pos | Team | Pld | W | D | L | GF | GA | GD | Pts | Qualification |
|---|---|---|---|---|---|---|---|---|---|---|
| 1 | Young Boys | 30 | 18 | 8 | 4 | 72 | 28 | +44 | 44 | Swiss champions, qualified for 1986–87 European Cup and entered 1986 Intertoto Cup |
| 2 | Xamax | 30 | 18 | 6 | 6 | 78 | 32 | +46 | 42 | Qualified for 1986–87 UEFA Cup |
| 3 | Luzern | 30 | 16 | 9 | 5 | 56 | 39 | +17 | 41 | Qualified for 1986–87 UEFA Cup and entered 1986 Intertoto Cup |
| 4 | Zürich | 30 | 15 | 9 | 6 | 64 | 43 | +21 | 39 | Entered 1986 Intertoto Cup |
| 5 | Grasshopper Club | 30 | 15 | 8 | 7 | 64 | 32 | +32 | 38 | Entered 1986 Intertoto Cup |
| 6 | Lausanne-Sport | 30 | 13 | 9 | 8 | 59 | 50 | +9 | 35 | Entered 1986 Intertoto Cup |
| 7 | Aarau | 30 | 14 | 6 | 10 | 62 | 47 | +15 | 34 | |
| 8 | Sion | 30 | 14 | 5 | 11 | 54 | 39 | +15 | 33 | Swiss Cup winners, qualified for 1986–87 Cup Winners' Cup |
| 9 | Servette | 30 | 14 | 3 | 13 | 49 | 50 | −1 | 31 | |
| 10 | Basel | 30 | 10 | 10 | 10 | 44 | 40 | +4 | 30 | |
| 11 | St. Gallen | 30 | 12 | 6 | 12 | 48 | 46 | +2 | 30 | Entered 1986 Intertoto Cup |
| 12 | Wettingen | 30 | 8 | 8 | 14 | 35 | 42 | −7 | 24 | |
| 13 | La Chaux-de-Fonds | 30 | 3 | 12 | 15 | 24 | 61 | −37 | 18 | |
| 14 | Vevey-Sports | 30 | 6 | 5 | 19 | 36 | 76 | −40 | 17 | |
| 15 | Grenchen | 30 | 5 | 6 | 19 | 33 | 81 | −48 | 16 | Relegated to 1986–87 Nationalliga B |
| 16 | Baden | 30 | 1 | 6 | 23 | 14 | 86 | −72 | 8 | Relegated to 1986–87 Nationalliga B |

Source: rsssf.com
Rules for classification: 1) Points; 2) Goal difference; 3) Goals scored; 4) Head-to-head points; 5) Away goals scored; 6) Draw.

=== Swiss Cup ===
| 22 September 1985 Round 3 | FC Brüttisellen | 0–5 (a.e.t.) | Zürich | Lindenbuck, Brüttisellen |
| 15:00 | | FCZ summary | 1' Kundert; 22' Häusermann; 46' Alliata; 49' Schneider; 80' Häusermann | Attendance: 1,671; Referee: (Switzerland) Willi Jaus (Feldmeilen) |

| 13 October 1985 Round 4 | Grasshopper Club | 5–3 (a.e.t.) | Zürich | Hardturm, Zürich |
| 16:00 | Egli 4' (1:0); Matthey 68' (2:0); Andermatt 94' (3:2); Sulser (109[4:3]); Sutter 116' (5:3) | FCZ summary | 75' (pen.) Kundert; 86' (2:2) Rufer; 105' (3:3) Bickel | Attendance: 10,500; Referee: (Switzerland) Renzo Peduzzi (Roveredo) |

=== Intertoto Cup ===
==== Group 6 matches ====
| 6 July 1985 Matchday 1 | Zürich (Switzerland) | 1–2 | (Czechoslovakia) Sparta Prague | Tuggen |
| | Schneider 23' (1:0) | FCZ summary | 77' (1:1) Griga; 84' (1:2) Griga | Attendance: 1,200; Referee: (Switzerland) Gottlieb Barmettler (Oberrieden, Lucerne) |

| 13 July 1985 Matchday 2 | Zürich (Switzerland) | 1–3 | (Denmark) Lyngby | Paul-Walser-Stiftung, Wohlen, Aargau |
| | Rufer 21' (1:2) | FCZ summary | 17' (0:1) Pretzmann; 19' (0:2) Foss Nielsen; 70' (1:3) Pretzmann | Attendance: 616; Referee: (Switzerland) Bruno Galler (Kirchdorf, Bern) |

| 17 July 1985 Matchday 3 | Lyngby (Denmark) | 1–0 | (Switzerland) Zürich | Hvalsø |
| | Christensen 29' (1:0) | FCZ summary | | Attendance: 1,775; Referee: (Denmark) Alex Jacobsen |

| 19 July 1985 Matchday 4 | Sparta Prague (Czechoslovakia) | 1–1 | (Switzerland) Zürich | Prague |
| | Ivan Hašek 53' (1:1) | FCZ summary | 39' (0:1) Häusermann; (yellow card) Lüdi; (yellow card) Kühni; (yellow card) Schönenberger | Attendance: 5.000 |

| 27 July 1985 Matchday 5 | Zürich (Switzerland) | 2–1 | (Poland) Lechia Gdańsk | Sportplatz Rüti, Uzwil |
| | Kraus 26' (1:1); Alliata 84' (2:1); Schönenberger (yellow card) | FCZ summary | Mozejko | Attendance: 900; Referee: (Switzerland) Kurt Röthlisberger (Suhr) |

| 3 August 1985 Matchday 6 | Lechia Gdańsk (Poland) | 1–0 | (Switzerland) Zürich | Gdańsk |
| | Oblewski 61' (1:0) | FCZ summary | (yellow card) Schönenberger | Attendance: 4,000; Referee: (Poland) Zalazko |

==== Final group table ====
| Pos | Team | Pld | W | D | L | GF | GA | GD | Pts | SPA | LYN | LGD | ZÜR |
|---|---|---|---|---|---|---|---|---|---|---|---|---|---|
| 1 | (Czechoslovakia) Sparta Prague | 6 | 3 | 2 | 1 | 15 | 8 | +7 | 8 | — | 6–2 | 0–0 | 1–1 |
| 2 | (Denmark) Lyngby | 6 | 4 | 0 | 2 | 12 | 12 | 0 | 8 | 1–4 | — | 4–1 | 1–0 |
| 3 | (Poland) Lechia Gdańsk | 6 | 2 | 1 | 3 | 6 | 9 | −3 | 5 | 3–2 | 0–1 | — | 1–0 |
| 4 | (Switzerland) Zürich | 6 | 1 | 1 | 4 | 5 | 9 | −4 | 3 | 1–2 | 1–3 | 2–1 | — |

Source: mogiel.net
Rules for classification: 1) Points; 2) Goal difference; 3) Goals scored; 4) Head-to-head points; 5) Away goals scored; 6) Draw.

=== Friendly matches ===
==== Pre- and mid-season ====
| 10 July 1985 Pre-season | Zürich | 6–0 | FC Küsnacht | Letzigrund, Zürich |
| | Schneider 20' (1:0); Schneider 35' (2:0); Schneider 55' (3:0); Krebs 80' (4:0); Alliata 84' (5:0); Fischer 88' (6:0) | FCZ summary |

| 21 July 1985 Exhibition game | Zürich | 0–6 | KFC Uerdingen 05 | Sportanlagen Moos, Affoltern am Albis |
| | | FCZ summary | 21' (0:1) Dämgen; 72' (0:2) Dämgen; 75' (0:3) Funkel; 81' (0:4) Funkel; 84' (0:5) Raschid; 86' (0:6) Loontiens | Attendance: 1,800; Referee: (Switzerland) Willi Jaus (Feldmeilen) |
Note: The team Uerdingen 05 were 1985 DFB-Pokal final winners.

| 24 July 1985 Exhibition game | Liechtenstein selection | 0–5 | Zürich | Sportplatz Blumenau, Triesen |
| | | FCZ summary | 13' (0:1) Schneider; 52' (0:2) Schneider; 68' (0:3) S. Paradiso; 81' (0:4) Hengartner; 83' (0:5) Schneider | Attendance: 450; Referee: (Switzerland) René Kellenberger (Herisau) |
Note: Very hot weather.

| 28 July 1985 Exhibition game | FC Altstätten (St. Gallen) | 4–6 | Zürich | Grüntal, Altstätten |
| | Sturm (1:1); Zellweger (2:3); Sturm (3:5); Steinmann (4:5) | FCZ summary | 12' (0:1) Rufer; 29' (1:2) Rufer; 40' (1:3) Schneider; 57' (pen.) Rufer; 59' (3:4) Schneider; 85' (4:6) Schneider | Attendance: 430; Referee: (Switzerland) Schürmann |

| 31 July 1985 Exhibition game | FC Stein am Rhein | 2–12 | Zürich | Sportplatz Degerfeld, Stein am Rhein |
| | Meier; Meier | FCZ summary | Krebs; Schneider; Kraus; Rufer; Schneider; Schneider; Schönenberger; S. Paradiso; Krebs; Krebs; M. Mautone; Alliata | Attendance: 800; Referee: (Switzerland) Jakob Baumann (Schaffhausen) |

| 27 August 1985 Exhibition game | Zürich | 0–4 | Bayern Munich | Letzigrund, Zürich |
| 20:00 | | FCZ summary | 7' (0:1) Mathy; 53' (0:2) Schwabl; 56' (0:3) Winklhofer; 88' (0:4) Wohlfarth | Attendance: 3,900; Referee: (Switzerland) Franz Gächter (Aarau, Suhr, Aargau) |
Note: Transfer match for Wolfgang Kraus.

| 10 September 1985 Mid-season | FC Uster | 2–6 | Zürich | Sportanlage Buchholz, Uster |
| | Goal | FCZ summary | M. Mautone; M. Mautone; Rufer; Kundert; Rufer; D. Mautone | Attendance: Played behind closed doors |

| 25 September 1985 Exhibition game | SC Buochs | 0–2 | Zürich | Stadion Seefeld, Buochs |
| | | FCZ summary | 13' (0:1) Schwaller; 76' (0:2) M. Mautone | Attendance: 300; Referee: (Switzerland) Ludwig Zurkinden (Zell, Zurich) |
Note: Buochs played the 1985–86 season in the 1. Liga (third-tier)

| 8 October 1985 Exhibition game | FC Zürich-Affoltern | 0–7 | Zürich | Letzigrund Trainingsground, Zürich |
| | | FCZ summary | Goal | Attendance: Played behind closed doors |

| 9 November 1985 Exhibition game | Zürich | 4–2 | FC Laufen | Letzigrund Trainingsground, Zürich |
| | Bickel (1:0); Schneider (2:2); Kundert (pen.); A. Paradiso | FCZ summary | (1:1) Dickert (1:2) | Referee: (Switzerland) Dossenbach (Effretikon) |

==== Winter break ====
| 16 January 1986 Exhibition game | CD Maspalomas | 0–1 | Zürich | Maspalomas |
| | | FCZ summary | 5' (0:1) Alliata |
Note: Maspalomas played in the Spanish 3rd Division in 1985/1986.

| 25 January 1986 Exhibition game | Zürich | 0–4 | FC Zug | Letzigrund Trainingsground, Zürich |
| | | FCZ summary | 58' (0:1) Bernauer; 73' (0:2) Bernauer; 77' (0:3) Mastroberardino; 78' (0:4) Bucher | Referee: (Switzerland) Jakob Baumann (Schaffhausen) |

| 1 February 1986 Exhibition game | Schaffhausen | 2–2 | Zürich | Schaffhausen |
| | Engesser 45' (1:1); Dreher 78' (2:2) | FCZ summary | 13' (0:1) Rufer; 55' (1:2) Schneider | Referee: (Switzerland) Marino Paggiola (Appenzell) |

| 11 February 1986 Exhibition game | Zürich | 5–0 | Thun | Marsa, Malta |
| | Rufer 24' (1:0); Rufer 27' (2:0); Kundert 56' (3:0); Rufer 62' (4:0); Bickel 69' (5:0) | FCZ summary | | Referee: (Switzerland) Hermann Burgermeister |
Note: Match as part of the training camp in Malta.

| 12 February 1986 Exhibition game | Zürich | 9–0 | Thun | Marsa, Malta |
| | Goal | FCZ summary |
Note: Match as part of the training camp in Malta.

| 14 February 1986 Exhibition game | Żebbuġ Rangers | 0–6 | Zürich | Marsa, Malta |
| | | FCZ summary | 19' (0:1) Alliata; 20' (0:2) Rufer; 25' (0:3) Kraus; 27' (0:4) Gretschnig; 56' (0:5) Rufer; 66' (0:6) Schneider |
Note: Playing time 2x 40 Minutes

| 16 February 1986 Exhibition game | Zürich | 5–0 | Hibernian | Marsa, Malta |
| | Gretschnig 8' (1:0); Gretschnig 36' (2:0); Alliata 38' (3:0); Rufer 45' (4:0); Kundert 80' (pen.) | FCZ summary | | Attendance: 200; Referee: (Switzerland) Hermann Burgermeister |
Note: Match as part of the training camp in Malta.

| 17 February 1986 Exhibition game | Zürich | 6–0 | League selection Malta | Marsa, Malta |
| | Alliata 8' (1:0); Rufer 22' (2:0); Alliata 31' (3:0); Rufer 32' (4:0); Rufer 41' (5:0); Rufer 63' (6:0) | FCZ summary |
Note: Match as part of the training camp in Malta.

| 18 February 1986 Exhibition game | Zürich | 1–0 | Hamrun Spartans | Marsa, Malta |
| | Rufer 30' (1:0); Rufer (yellow card) (yellow-red card); Häusermann (red card) | FCZ summary |
Note: Match as part of the training camp in Malta.

| 21 February 1986 Exhibition game | Zürich | 1–2 | Wettingen | Letzigrund Trainingsground, Zürich |
| | Bickel 43' (1:2) | FCZ summary | 10' (0:1) Killmaier; 19' (0:2) Killmaier | Referee: (Switzerland) Kellenberger (Zollikon) |

| 22 February 1986 Exhibition game | Zürich | 2–1 | Red Star | Letzigrund Trainingsground, Zürich |
| | Rufer 17' (1:0); Lüdi 45' (2:0) | FCZ summary | 53' (2:1) Heuberger | Referee: (Switzerland) Franz Gächter (Aarau, Suhr, Aargau) |
Note: 10 cm of snow!

| 2 March 1986 Exhibition game | FC Ascona | 2–5 | Zürich | Stadio Comunale Ascona |
| | Weidle 71' (pen.); Weidle 80' (2:4) | FCZ summary | 37' (pen.) Bickel; 46' (0:2) Rufer; 50' (pen.) Rufer; 54' (0:4) Alliata; 87' (2:5) Bickel | Referee: (Switzerland) Francesco Bianchi (Chiasso) |

| 4 March 1986 Exhibition game | SC Zug | 4–5 | Zürich | Herti Allmend Stadion, Zug |
| | Hemmeter 42' (1:4); Bauer 52' (pen.); Martinelli 56' (3:4); Martinelli 84' (4:4) | FCZ summary | 1' (0:1) Alliata; 15' (0:2) Gretschnig; 20' (0:3) Bickel; 26' (0:4) Bickel; 84' (4:5) Rufer | Referee: (Switzerland) Kurt Röthlisberger (Aarau) |

| 18 March 1986 Mid-season | FC Töss (Winterthur) | 0–6 | Zürich | Winterthur |
| | | FCZ summary | Goal | Attendance: Played behind closed doors |

== Sources ==
- dbFCZ Homepage
- Switzerland 1985–86 at RSSSF

| Preceded by 1984–85 | FC Zürich seasons | Succeeded by 1986–87 |
