= 1986–87 Swiss Cup =

Tournament details
- Country: Switzerland
- Teams: 192

Final positions
- Champions: Young Boys
- Runners-up: Servette

Tournament statistics
- Matches played: 191 plus 1 replay

The 1986–87 Swiss Cup was the 62nd season of Switzerland's annual football cup competition organised by the Swiss Football Association.

== Overview ==
The competition began on 9 August 1986 with the first games of Round 1 and ended on Whit Monday 8 June 1987 with the final held at the former Wankdorf Stadium in Bern. The teams from the Nationalliga B were granted byes for the first round. The teams from the Nationalliga A were granted byes for the first two rounds. The winners of the cup qualified themselves for the first round of the Cup Winners' Cup in the next season.

The draw was respecting regionalities, when possible and the lower classed team was granted home advantage. In the entire competition, the matches were played in a single knockout format. In the event of a draw after 90 minutes, the match went into extra time. In the event of a draw at the end of extra time, a penalty shoot-out was to decide which team qualified for the next round. In and after the quarter-finals replays were foreseen.

== Round 1 ==
In the first round a total of 160 clubs participated from the third-tier and lower. Reserve teams were not admitted to the competition.

=== Summary ===
Team 1	Score	Team 2
9–10 August 1987
FC Donneleye	0–2	Yverdon-Sports
FC Champvent	0–2	FC Saint-Jean GE
FC Chêne-Aubonne	0–5	Echallens
Meyrin	5–2 (a.e.t.)	Stade Nyonnais
CS Italien Genève	3–5	Stade Lausanne
FC AÏre-le-Lignon	0–4	FC Vernier
FC St-Barthélémy	1–3	Le Locle-Sport
FC Moudon	0–6	FC Collex-Bossy
FC Bramois	2–3	Montreux-Sports
FC Raron	5–0	FC Sierre
FC Conthey	2–4	Monthey
FC Vignoble Cully	0–5	FC Leytron
Lausanne Uni-Club	2–7	FC Stade Payerne
CS La Tour-de-Peilz	3–1	FC Saint-Légier
FC Lutry	3–2 (a.e.t.)	FC Savièse
FC Fully	4–3	FC Lalden
FC Saint-Blaise	0–1	Central Fribourg
FC Prez-vers-Noréaz	0–4	Colombier
SV Lyss	2–1 (a.e.t.)	Solothurn
FC Lotzwil-Madiswil	4–0	Lengnau
FC Länggasse (Bern)	0–1	Bern
FC Lerchenfeld (Thun)	1–1 (a.e.t.) (2–4 p)	Burgdorf
Serrières	1–2	FC Domdidier
FC Boudry	0–8	Köniz
FC Aaarwangen	2–4	Bümpliz
FC Farvagny	2–3	FC Klus-Balsthal
Dürrenast	0–1	FC WEF Bern
FC Viktoria Bern	3–1	FC Hauterive
FC Châtel-St-Denis	4–3	Thun
FC Fétigny	1–0	FC Langenthal
FC Allschwil	1–3	FC Suhr
FC Bellach	0–2	Old Boys
FC Härkingen	1–0	Concordia Basel
FC Frenkendorf	1–4	Laufen
Italgrenchen	0–9	FC Muri
FC Pratteln	3–2	Delémont
FC Bévilard	0–4	Nordstern
Blustavia Solothurn	1–3	Fribourg
SC Flumenthal	1–2	SV Sissach
FC Rheinfelden	3–0	FC Breite (Basel)
FC Develier	0–2	Moutier
FC Lamboing	2–1	FC Bassecourt
US Boncourt	0–3	Alle
SC Baudepartement Basel	0–1	FC Breitenbach
SC Emmen	1–3	FC Sursee
FC Küssnacht am Rigi	1–1 (a.e.t.) (3–4 p)	SC Reiden
FC Fislisbach	1–2	FC Spreitenbach
FC Oberentfelden	0–4	Emmenbrücke
FC Turgi	1–3	Schöftland
FC Schattdorf	1–4	FC Altdorf (Uri)
FC Buttisholz	4–6	FC Gunzwil
FC Baar	1–4	FC Aegeri
FC Wohlhusen	0–1 (a.e.t.)	Ibach
Wohlen	2–7 (a.e.t.)	FC Einsiedeln
FC Männedorf	1–6	FC Küsnacht (ZH)
FC Glattfelden	1–4	Gossau
FC Wetzikon	3–1	FC Kilchberg (ZH)
FC Effretikon	2–0	FC Zürich-Affoltern
FC Dietikon	1–2	FC Dübendorf
FC Beringen	0–2	Red Star
Herisau	1–0	Brühl
Ballspielclub Zürich	1–2 (a.e.t.)	FC Zug
FC Flawil	1–3	FC Rorschach
FC Kirchberg (SG)	1–2	Frauenfeld
FC Amriswil	0–3	Vaduz
Chur	3–1	Balzers
FC Rebstein	1–5	FC Rüti
FC Wädenswil	2–3 (a.e.t.)	Buochs
FC Wallisellen	1–2 (a.e.t.)	Blue Stars
FC Berg	1–3	FC Brüttisellen
FC Birmensdorf	1–2	FC Stäfa
FC Niederurnen	1–3	FC Altstätten (St. Gallen)
FC Turicum	2–0	Young Fellows
FC Sargans	1–8	FC Uzwil
FC Wiesendangen	0–3	Kreuzlingen
AS Breganzona	0–1	FC Ascona
SC Balerna	2–1	US Giubiasco
FC Morbio	0–5	FC Ponte Tresa
US Monte Carasso	2–3	Mendrisio
FC Onex	1–6 * FF awd 3–3	FC Grand-Lancy

- The match Onex–Grand-Lancy declaired forfait and awarded as 3-0 victory for Onex, because a player of Grand-Lancy was not qualified.

== Round 2 ==
The teams from the Nationalliga B joined the competition in this round. The draw was respecting regionalities, when possible and the lower classed team was granted home advantage.

=== Summary ===
Team 1	Score	Team 2
6 September 1987
FC Vernier	1–5 (a.e.t.)	FC Saint-Jean GE
Burgdorf	1–3	Bulle
FC Collex-Bossy	1–9	Etoile Carouge
CS La Tour-de-Peilz	0–2	FC Renens
WEF Bern	0–5	ES Malley
FC Lotzwil	0–2	Fribourg
FC Raron	1–0 (a.e.t.)	Montreux-Sports
6–7 September 1987
FC Brüttisellen	2–1	SC Zug
FC Stäfa ZH	1–4	FC Schaffhausen
FC Dübendorf	1–3 (a.e.t.)	Baden
FC Ascona	0–2	Chiasso
FC Altstätten (St. Gallen)	2–6	Lugano
FC Lutry	0–6	Martigny-Sports
FC Fétigny	0–3	Biel-Bienne
FC Rheinfelden	1–3	Grenchen
SV Sissach	1–3	FC Olten
SC Reiden	0–1	Kriens
FC Ponte Tresa	0–2	Winterthur
FC Onex	1–7	Chênois
Echallens	1–0	FC Leytron
Köniz	2–1	FC Châtel-St-Denis
FC Breitenbach	4–3	Moutier
Nordstern	1–2	Emmenbrücke
FC Suhr	2–2 (a.e.t.) (1–4 p)	Old Boys
FC Muri	3–1 (a.e.t.)	FC Einsielden
FC Altdorf (Uri)	2–0	Red Star
Chur	1–2	SC Zug
FC Rohrschach	2–2 (a.e.t.) (4–5 p)	Vaduz
Meyrin	5–1	Yverdon-Sports
Le Locle-Sport	2–1	FC Stade Payerne
FC Fully	1–2	Monthey
Central Fribourg	2–3	Stade Lausanne
Colombier	4–2 (a.e.t.)	Bümpliz
FC Klus-Balstahl	4–2 (a.e.t.)	FC Viktoria Bern
FC Pratteln	2–5	Laufen
Blue Stars	2–2 (a.e.t.) (6–7 p)	FC Sursee
Ibach	5–0	FC Turicum
FC Aegeri	0–1 (a.e.t.)	FC Küsnacht (ZH)
Buochs	3–0	FC Effretikon
FC Rüti	3–3 (a.e.t.) (1–4 p)	FC Uzwil
Frauenfeld	0–2	Mendrisio
Kreuzlingen	3–0	Herisau
SC Balerna	2–3	Gossau
FC Bern	1–0	FC Spreitenbach
Alle	2–0	Schöftland
SV Lyss	8–2	FC Härkingen
FC Lamboing	4–1	FC Domdidier
FC Domdidier	4–2	FC Wetzikon

== Round 3 ==
The teams from the Nationalliga A joined the competition in this round. The draw was respecting regionalities, when possible and the lower classed team was granted home advantage.

=== Summary ===
Team 1	Score	Team 2
19 September 1986
Monthey	3–2	Stade Lausanne
Buochs	1–3	Grasshopper Club
20 September 1986
Köniz	1–9	Basel
Bern	2–3	Fribourg
Mendrisio	5–3	Zürich
Vaduz	1–2 (a.e.t.)	Kriens
Winterthur	2–2 (a.e.t.) (5–4 p)	Schaffhausen
FC Altdorf (Uri)	2–5	FC Muri
Ibach	1–5	Locarno
Lugano	2–4	St. Gallen
Kreuzlingen	1–1 (a.e.t.) (5–3 p)	Chiasso
FC Gunzwil	1–5	Bellinzona
Emmenbrücke	1–4	Young Boys
FC Zug	3–2 (a.e.t.)	FC Uzwil
Grenchen	4–0	FC Olten
Echallens	3–1	FC Saint-Jean GE
Martigny-Sports	3–1	Vevey Sports
Chênois	1–2	Sion
Meyrin	2–1	Etoile Carouge
FC Breitenbach	2–8	Neuchâtel Xamax
Gossau	0–1 (a.e.t.)	FC Sursee
FC Brüttisellen	1–2	Luzern
ES Malley	3–1	FC Le Locle
FC Lamboing	0–3	Old Boys
FC Renens	1–2 (a.e.t.)	Servette
FC Raron	2–4	Lausanne-Sport
Bulle	0–3	La Chaux-de-Fonds
Colombier	1–0	Laufen
SV Lyss	0–1	Aarau
FC Küsnacht	0–2	Baden
FC Klus-Balsthal	2–3	Wettingen
Biel-Bienne	3–0	Alle

=== Matches ===
20 September 1986
15:00

Emmenbrücke	1–4	Young Boys
Wiprächtiger 51' (1:4)	YB summary	14' (0:1) Prytz; 20' (0:2) Siwek; 23' (0:3) Siwek; 41' (0:4) Gertschen

Stadion Gersag, Emmen
Attendance: 2,000
Referee: (Switzerland) Peter Kellenberger

20 September 1986
16:00

SV Lyss	0–1	Aarau
	FCA summary	77' (0:1) Seiler

Sportzentrum Grien, Lyss
Attendance: 1,200
Referee: (Switzerland) Andreas Schluchter (Schönenbuch)
- Lyss played the 1986–87 season in the 2. Liga (fourth-tier)

20 September 1986
16:30

Köniz	2–9	Basel
Nadig 17' (o.g. 1:1); Bräm 76' (2:8)	FCB summary	6' (0:1) Maissen; 27' (1:2) Maissen; 29' (1:3) Maissen; 48' (1:4) Knup; 52' (1:5) Nadig; 59' (1:6) Schällibaum; 66' (1:7) Maissen; 68' (1:8) Schällibaum; 81' (2:9) Knup

Liebefeld-Hessgut, Liebefeld
Attendance: 750
Referee: (Switzerland) Serge Muhmenthaler

20 September 1986
16:30

Mendrisio	5–3	Zürich
Trapletti 14' (1:2); Trapletti 16' (2:2); Sorci 37' (3:3); Mantilla 50' (4:3); Felappi 89' (5:3)	FCZ summary	9' (0:1) Pellegrini; 13' (0:2) Gretschnig; 34' (2:3) Pellegrini; (yellow card) 50' (yellow-red card) 87' Stoob; (red card) 90' Hermann Stessl (coach)

Stadio comunale Lido, Locarno
Attendance: 1,500
Referee: (Switzerland) Daniel Roduit (Sion)

20 September 1986
16:30

FC Renens	2–1 (a.e.t.)	Servette
Goal	Servette summary	Eriksen; Eriksen

Zone sportive du Censuy, Renens
- Renens played the 1986–87 season in the Nationalliga B (second-tier)

== Round 4 ==
=== Summary ===
The draw for this round also respected regionalities, when possible, and the lower classed team was again granted home advantage.

Team 1	Score	Team 2
18 October 1986
Servette	2–0	Lausanne-Sport
Bellinzona	1–2	Young Boys
Aarau	3–0	Baden
Basel	3–1	Fribourg
Monthey	0–3	Neuchâtel Xamax
La Chaux-de-Fonds	1–1 (a.e.t.) (4–2 p)	Colombier
Sion	4–1	Meyrin
ES Malley	2–3	Old Boys
Winterthur	5–0	FC Muri
19 October 1986
Locarno	2–1	St. Gallen
Wettingen	4–1	Biel-Bienne
FC Sursee	0–4	Luzern
Kreuzlingen	0–5	Grasshopper Club
Echallens	3–2	Martigny-Sports
FC Zug	0–5	Grenchen
Mendrisio	2–3	Kriens

=== Matches ===
18 October 1986
20:00

Servette	2–0	Lausanne-Sport
Cacciapaglia (1:0); Eriksen (2:0)	Servette summary

Stade des Charmilles, Geneva

18 October 1986
17:30

Bellinzona	1–2	Young Boys
Fargeon 48' (1:1)	YB summary	34' (o.g.) Schönenberger; 53' (1:2) Zuffi

Stadio Comunale Bellinzona, Bellinzona
Attendance: 14,000
Referee: (Switzerland) Charles Hänni

18 October 1986
17:30

Aarau	3–0	Baden
Zwahlen 9' (1:0); Schär 12' (2:0); Wassmer 79' (3:0)	FCA summary

Stadion Brügglifeld, Aarau
Attendance: 2,000
Referee: (Switzerland) Gottfried Friedrich

18 October 1986
15:00

Basel	3–1	Fribourg
Mata 60' (1:0); Gonçalo 78' (2:1); Gonçalo 88' (3:1)	FCB summary	73' (1:1) Chassot

St. Jakob-Park, Basel
Attendance: 1,250
Referee: (Switzerland) Peter Kellenberger

== Round 5 ==
=== Summary ===
The draw for the fifth round no longer respected clubs out of their regionalities, but the lower classed team was again granted home advantage.

Team 1	Score	Team 2
9 November 1986
Winterthur	2–2 (a.e.t.) (4–5 p)	Locarno
11 November 1986
Basel	1–2	Kriens
Grasshopper Club	0–3	Young Boys
Sion	3–0	Neuchâtel Xamax
Luzern	4–0	Old Boys
Servette	7–2	La Chaux-de-Fonds
Aarau	1–0 (a.e.t.)	Wettingen
7 December 1986
Grenchen	4–2	Echallens

=== Matches ===
11 November 1986
20:00

Grasshopper Club	0–3	Young Boys
	YB summary	62' (0:1) Bamert; 78' (0:2) Nilsson; 86' (0:3) Zuffi

Letzigrund, Zürich
Attendance: 5,000
Referee: (Switzerland)

11 November 1986
20:00

Servette	7–2	La Chaux-de-Fonds
1x Sinval; 3x Pavoni; 2x Schnyder; 1x Decastel	Servette summary	Goal

Stade des Charmilles, Geneva

11 November 1986
20:00

Aarau	1–0 (a.e.t.)	Wettingen
Schär 117' (1:0)	FCA summary

Stadion Brügglifeld, Aarau
Attendance: 3,600
Referee: (Switzerland) Rolf Blattmann (Zeiningen)

11 November 1986
20:00

Basel	1–2	Kriens
Gonçalo 4' (1:0); Maissen (yellow card) 52'	FCB summary	(yellow card) 26' Zemp; 31' (1:1) Zemp; 65' (1:2) Zemp

St. Jakob-Park, Basel
Attendance: 1,500
Referee: (Switzerland) Manfred Schlup Grenchen

== Quarter-finals ==
=== Summary ===
Team 1	Score	Team 2
29 March 1987
Kriens	0–2	Locarno
Sion	2–0	Luzern
7 April 1987
Young Boys	1–0	Grenchen
Servette	2–1	Aarau

=== Matches ===
7 April 1987
20:00

Young Boys	1–0	Grenchen
Wittwer 51' (1:0)	YB summary

Wankdorf Stadium, Bern
Attendance: 8,200
Referee: (Switzerland) Georges Sandoz (Auvernier)

7 April 1987
20:00

Servette	2–1	Aarau
Sinval 32' (1:1); Eriksen 65' (1:2)	Servette summary FCA summary	2' (0:1) Zwahlen

Stade des Charmilles, Geneva
Attendance: 4,300
Referee: (Switzerland) Marco Raveglia (San Vittore)

== Semi-finals ==
=== Summary ===
Team 1	Score	Team 2
1 May 19
Locarno	1–4 (a.e.t.)	Young Boys
Sion	1–1 (a.e.t.)	Servette

Team 1	Score	Team 2
1 May 19
Servette	3–1	Sion

=== Matches ===
28 April 1987
20:00

Locarno	1–4 (a.e.t.)	Young Boys
Abächerli 55' (1:1)	YB summary	49' (0:1) Zuffi; 98' (1:2) Prytz; 114' (1:3) Nilsson; 118' (1:4) Nilsson

Stadio comunale Lido, Locarno
Attendance: 8,000
Referee: (Switzerland) Philippe Mercier (Pully)

28 April 1987
20:00

Sion	1–1 (a.e.t.)	Servette
Lopez 77' (1:0)	Servette summary	86' (1:1) Schnyder

Stade Tourbillon, Sion
Attendance: 13,200
Referee: (Switzerland) Renzo Peduzzi (Roveredo)

Replay

12 May 1987
20:00

Servette	3–1	Sion
Eriksen 16' (1:0); Eriksen 24' (2:0); Favre 62' (3:0)	Servette summary	69' (3:1) Bonvin

Stade des Charmilles, Geneva
Attendance: 15,000
Referee: (Switzerland) Kurt Röthlisberger (Suhr)

== Final ==
8 June 1987
15:00

Young Boys	4–2 (a.e.t.)	Servette
Zuffi 18'; Prytz 55' (pen.); Siwek 93'; Wittwer (yellow card) 97'; Baumann (yellow card) 98'; Gertschen 117'	Fussball-Schweiz summary	17' Schnyder; 67' Decastel

Wankdorf Stadium, Bern
Attendance: 28,000
Referee: (Switzerland) Georges Sandoz (Auvernier)

Young Boys won the cup and this was their sixth cup title to this date

== Further in Swiss football ==
- 1986–87 Nationalliga A
- 1986–87 Swiss 1. Liga

== Sources ==
- Fussball-Schweiz
- 1986–87 at fcb-achiv.ch
- Switzerland 1986–87 at RSSSF
