= NEC Nijmegen in European football =

European football record of NEC Nijmegen

NEC Nijmegen in European football includes the games which are played by NEC Nijmegen in competitions organized by UEFA.

== Totals ==
As of 5 November 2026

Competition	Participations	Matches	Won	Drawn	Lost	Goals for	Goals against
UEFA Cup Winners' Cup	1	4	1	1	2	4	6
UEFA Cup / UEFA Europa League	3	14	5	2	7	17	22
Intertoto Cup	1	2	0	1	1	0	1
UEFA Champions League	1	4	1	1	2	3	7
Total	6	24	7	5	12	24	36

== Top scorers ==
As of 5 November 2026

Rank	Goals	Player	Last goal	Competition
1	4	(Netherlands) Bryan Linssen	5 November 2026	2026–27 UEFA Europa League
2	3	(Netherlands) Jhon van Beukering	18 December 2008	2008–09 UEFA Cup
3	2	(Denmark) Clement Bischoff	5 November 2026	2026–27 UEFA Europa League
3	2	(Netherlands) Michel Mommertz	2 November 1983	1983–84 European Cup Winners' Cup
3	2	(Suriname) Tjaronn Chery	22 October 2026	2026–27 UEFA Europa League

== Record by country ==
As of 5 November 2026

Rank	Country	Pld	W	D	L	GF	GA	Opponents
1	Norway	4	1	1	2	3	7	Bodø/Glimt (2), Brann (2)
2	Croatia	2	1	0	1	6	5	Dinamo Zagreb (2)
2	Germany	2	0	0	2	0	4	Hamburger SV (2)
2	Greece	2	1	1	0	2	1	Olympiacos (2)
2	(Republic of Ireland) Ireland	2	0	1	1	0	1	Cork City (2)
2	Italy	2	1	0	1	2	5	Juventus FC (1), Udinese (1)
2	Poland	2	0	0	2	2	4	Wisła Kraków (2)
2	Romania	2	1	1	0	1	0	Dinamo București (2)
2	Spain	2	0	0	2	2	5	Barcelona (2)
10	Bulgaria	1	0	1	0	1	1	PFC Levski Sofia (1)
10	Cyprus	1	1	0	0	3	1	AC Omonia (1)
10	England	1	0	0	1	0	1	Tottenham Hotspur (1)
10	Russia	1	1	0	0	2	1	Spartak Moscow (1)

== Results ==
As of 5 November 2026

Season	Round	Opponent	Home	Away	Aggregate
1983–84 Cup Winners' Cup	First round	(Norway) Brann	1–1	1–0	2–1
1983–84 Cup Winners' Cup	Second round	(Spain) Barcelona	2–3	0–2	2–5
2003–04 UEFA Cup	First round	(Poland) Wisła Kraków	1–2	1–2	2–4
2004 Intertoto Cup	Second round	(Republic of Ireland) Cork City	0–0	0–1	0–1
2008–09 UEFA Cup	Second round	(Romania) Dinamo București	1–0	0–0	1–0
2008–09 UEFA Cup	Group stage	(Croatia) Dinamo Zagreb	—N/a	2–3	3rd
2008–09 UEFA Cup	Group stage	(England) Tottenham Hotspur	0–1	—N/a	3rd
2008–09 UEFA Cup	Group stage	(Russia) Spartak Moscow	—N/a	2–1	3rd
2008–09 UEFA Cup	Group stage	(Italy) Udinese	2–0	—N/a	3rd
2008–09 UEFA Cup	Round of 32	(Germany) Hamburger SV	0–3	0–1	0–4
2026–27 UEFA Champions League	Third qualifying round	(Greece) Olympiacos	2–1	0–0	2–1
2026–27 UEFA Champions League	Play-off round	(Norway) Bodø/Glimt	1–3	0–3	1–6
2026–27 UEFA Europa League (Transferred from CL)
2026–27 UEFA Europa League (Transferred from CL)	League phase	(Italy) Juventus	—N/a	0–5	
2026–27 UEFA Europa League (Transferred from CL)	League phase	(Bulgaria) Levski Sofia	1–1	—N/a	
2026–27 UEFA Europa League (Transferred from CL)	League phase	(Croatia) Dinamo Zagreb	—N/a	4–2	
2026–27 UEFA Europa League (Transferred from CL)	League phase	(Cyprus) AC Omonia	3–1	—N/a	
2026–27 UEFA Europa League (Transferred from CL)	League phase	(France) Stade Rennais		—N/a	
2026–27 UEFA Europa League (Transferred from CL)	League phase	FC Ararat-Armenia	—N/a		
2026–27 UEFA Europa League (Transferred from CL)	League phase	(Portugal) S.L. Benfica		—N/a	
2026–27 UEFA Europa League (Transferred from CL)	League phase	(Slovenia) NK Celje	—N/a		

=== Intertoto Cup ===
(Note: The tournament was founded in 1961–62, but was only taken over by UEFA in 1995. Therefore the results of Intertoto Cup before the year 1995 are excluded from the statistics.)

Competition	Round	Opponent	Home	Away	Aggregate
1969 Intertoto Cup	Group stage	(Slovakia) Žilina	1–1	1–2	3rd
1969 Intertoto Cup	Group stage	(Switzerland) Bellinzona	2–0	3–3	3rd
1969 Intertoto Cup	Group stage	(Sweden) Örebro SK	0–0	3–3	3rd
1986 Intertoto Cup	Group stage	(Hungary) MTK Budapest	0–3	2–2	4th
1986 Intertoto Cup	Group stage	(Belgium) Standard Liège	0–1	1–1	4th
1986 Intertoto Cup	Group stage	(West Germany) Fortuna Düsseldorf	4–3	0–3	4th

=== Summer Cup ===
(Note: The Summer Cup (or Intertoto Cup 1978 Part 1, also called European Summer League) was a intercalated European soccer competition by the organizers of the Intertoto Cup. The Intertoto Cup had been an opportunity for teams to continue playing soccer in the summer since 1967. In 1978 two editions were played, the Summer Cup and the regular Intertoto Cup 1978, because due to the 1978 World Cup the competitions ended early there was a very long football-free period for the clubs. The Summer Cup was played in May and the regular Intertoto Cup in June/July. Only group matches were organized and there was no follow-up tournament. MSV Duisburg, Eintracht Braunschweig and First Vienna were the only teams to participate in both the Summer Cup and the regular Intertoto Cup in 1978.)

Competition	Round	Opponent	Home	Away	Aggregate
1978 Summer Cup	Group stage	(Germany) MSV Duisburg	4–2	0–6	4th
1978 Summer Cup	Group stage	(Belgium) Antwerp	3–2	0–2	4th
1978 Summer Cup	Group stage	(France) Bordeaux	1—2	2–4	4th
