= 1986 Intertoto Cup =

In the 1986 Intertoto Cup no knock-out rounds were contested, and therefore no winner was declared.

== Group stage ==
The teams were divided into twelve groups of four teams each.

=== Group 1 ===
Pos	Team	Pld	W	D	L	GF	GA	GD	Pts
1	(West Germany) Fortuna Düsseldorf	6	3	2	1	17	7	+10	8
2	(Hungary) MTK	6	2	3	1	13	10	+3	7
3	(Belgium) Liège	6	2	1	3	7	14	−7	5
4	(Netherlands) N.E.C.	6	1	2	3	7	13	−6	4

Rules for classification: 1) points; 2) goal difference; 3) number of goals scored.

=== Group 2 ===
Pos	Team	Pld	W	D	L	GF	GA	GD	Pts	BER	UER	LS	STA
1	(East Germany) Union Berlin	6	4	1	1	11	8	+3	9	—	3–2	1–0	4–1
2	(West Germany) Bayer Uerdingen	6	4	0	2	13	8	+5	8	3–0	—	2–1	3–1
3	(Switzerland) Lausanne-Sport	6	2	1	3	7	6	+1	5	1–1	2–0	—	3–1
4	(Belgium) Standard Liège	6	1	0	5	6	15	−9	2	1–2	1–3	1–0	—

Source: mogiel.net
Rules for classification: 1) points; 2) goal difference; 3) number of goals scored.

=== Group 3 ===
Pos	Team	Pld	W	D	L	GF	GA	GD	Pts
1	(Sweden) Malmö FF	6	3	1	2	13	5	+8	7
2	(Hungary) Videoton	6	2	2	2	7	7	0	6
3	(Poland) Górnik Zabrze	6	3	0	3	5	6	−1	6
4	(Norway) Rosenborg	6	1	3	2	5	12	−7	5

Rules for classification: 1) points; 2) goal difference; 3) number of goals scored.

=== Group 4 ===
Pos	Team	Pld	W	D	L	GF	GA	GD	Pts
1	(East Germany) Rot-Weiss Erfurt	6	4	1	1	8	4	+4	9
2	(Sweden) Kalmar	6	3	2	1	12	10	+2	8
3	(Bulgaria) Vitosha Sofia	6	2	2	2	12	11	+1	6
4	(Norway) Lillestrøm	6	0	1	5	2	9	−7	1

Rules for classification: 1) points; 2) goal difference; 3) number of goals scored.

=== Group 5 ===
Pos	Team	Pld	W	D	L	GF	GA	GD	Pts	SIG	HAN	LWA	YB
1	(Czechoslovakia) Sigma Olomouc	6	3	1	2	12	11	+1	7	—	3–2	3–0	3–1
2	(West Germany) Hannover 96	6	2	2	2	10	10	0	6	1–1	—	2–2	2–1
3	(Poland) Legia Warszawa	6	2	2	2	9	9	0	6	5–1	1–0	—	0–0
4	(Switzerland) Young Boys	6	2	1	3	9	10	−1	5	2–1	2–3	3–1	—

Source: mogiel.net
Rules for classification: 1) points; 2) goal difference; 3) number of goals scored.

=== Group 6 ===
Pos	Team	Pld	W	D	L	GF	GA	GD	Pts	ÚJP	AGF	GCZ	ADM
1	(Hungary) Újpest	6	5	0	1	12	6	+6	10	—	1–0	3–1	2–0
2	(Denmark) AGF	6	3	0	3	8	9	−1	6	2–3	—	2–1	1–0
3	(Switzerland) Grasshopper Club	6	2	1	3	9	9	0	5	0–1	4–1	—	2–1
4	(Austria) Admira Wacker Wein	6	1	1	4	5	10	−5	3	3–2	0–2	1–1	—

Source: mogiel.net
Rules for classification: 1) points; 2) goal difference; 3) number of goals scored.

=== Group 7 ===
Pos	Team	Pld	W	D	L	GF	GA	GD	Pts	BRØ	WID	MAG	STG
1	(Denmark) Brøndby	6	4	2	0	16	8	+8	10	—	3–0	4–3	3–0
2	(Poland) Widzew Łódź	6	4	1	1	16	11	+5	9	3–3	—	3–0	3–2
3	(East Germany) Magdeburg	6	1	1	4	12	15	−3	3	1–1	3–4	—	5–1
4	(Switzerland) St. Gallen	6	1	0	5	6	16	−10	2	1–2	0–3	2–0	—

Source: mogiel.net
Rules for classification: 1) points; 2) goal difference; 3) number of goals scored.

=== Group 8 ===
Pos	Team	Pld	W	D	L	GF	GA	GD	Pts
1	(Denmark) Lyngby	6	6	0	0	16	3	+13	12
2	(Israel) Maccabi Haifa	6	2	2	2	7	10	−3	6
3	(Israel) Hapoel Tel Aviv	6	1	2	3	9	12	−3	4
4	(Austria) GAK	6	1	0	5	3	10	−7	2

Rules for classification: 1) points; 2) goal difference; 3) number of goals scored.

=== Group 9 ===
Pos	Team	Pld	W	D	L	GF	GA	GD	Pts
1	(Poland) Lech Poznań	6	2	4	0	11	4	+7	8
2	(Austria) Linzer ASK	6	1	5	0	6	5	+1	7
3	(Denmark) Odense	6	2	2	2	12	14	−2	6
4	(Hungary) Siófoki Bányász	6	0	3	3	6	12	−6	3

Rules for classification: 1) points; 2) goal difference; 3) number of goals scored.

=== Group 10 ===
Table

Pos	Team	Pld	W	D	L	GF	GA	GD	Pts	GÖT	VIT	CSK	ZÜR
1	(Sweden) IFK Göteborg	6	4	0	2	13	7	+6	8	—	5–0	1–0	3–0
2	(Czechoslovakia) Vítkovice	6	3	1	2	9	12	−3	7	3–1	—	1–3	2–1
3	(Bulgaria) Sredets Sofia	6	3	0	3	8	6	+2	6	2–0	0–1	—	2–0
4	(Switzerland) Zürich	6	1	1	4	8	13	−5	3	2–3	2–2	3–1	—

Source: mogiel.net
Rules for classification: 1) points; 2) goal difference; 3) number of goals scored.

Matches

21 June 1986
Matchday 1

IFK Göteborg (Sweden)	3–0	(Switzerland) Zürich
Fredriksson 15' (pen.); Larsson 33' (pen.); Mordt 37' (3:0)	FCZ summary	(red card) Lüdi; (yellow card) Kundert; (yellow card) Landolt

Varberg
Attendance: 3,300
Referee: (Sweden) Rolf Eriksson

28 June 1986
Matchday 2

Sredets Sofia (Bulgaria)	2–0	(Switzerland) Zürich
Tanev 11' (1:0); Stoichkov 49' (2:0)	FCZ summary	(yellow card) (yellow-red card) Kundert

Stadion Balgarska Armia, Sofia
Attendance: 3,000
Referee: (Bulgaria) Zontschew

5 July 1986
Matchday 3

Zürich (Switzerland)	3–1	(Bulgaria) Sredets Sofia
Rufer 20' (1:0); Alliata 42' (2:0); Bickel 78' (pen.)	FCZ summary	56' (2:1) Tanev

Sportplatz Ri-Au, Bad Ragaz
Attendance: 900
Referee: (Switzerland) Willi Jaus (Feldmeilen)

9 July 1986
Matchday 4

Zürich (Switzerland)	2–2	(Czechoslovakia) Vítkovice
Rufer 43' (1:1); Bickel 73' (pen- 2:2); Landolt (yellow card)	FCZ summary	12' (0:1) Beles; 64' (1:2) Grussmann; (yellow card) Kovacik

Sportplatz Rüti, Uzwil
Attendance: 950
Referee: (Switzerland) Renzo Peduzzi (Roveredo)

13 July 1986
Matchday 5

Vítkovice (Czechoslovakia)	2–1	(Switzerland) Zürich
Bartl 34' (1:0); Beles 51' (2:0)	FCZ summary	85' (2:1) Romano; (yellow card) Lüdi

Frýdek-Místek
Attendance: 5,000
Referee: (Czechoslovakia) Jiří Jašek

19 July 1986
Matchday 6

Zürich (Switzerland)	2–3	(Sweden) IFK Göteborg
Bickel 17' (1:0); Bickel 62' (2:3); Kundert (yellow card) 70'	FCZ summary	40' (1:1) Mordt; 47' (1:2) Ekström; 53' (1:3) Ekström; (yellow card) 77' Johansson)

Letzigrund, Zürich
Attendance: 1,350
Referee: (Switzerland) Werner Liebi (Thun)

=== Group 11 ===
Pos	Team	Pld	W	D	L	GF	GA	GD	Pts	SLP	STU	LUZ	FER
1	(Czechoslovakia) Slavia Prague	6	4	2	0	11	2	+9	10	—	1–1	1–1	2–0
2	(Austria) Sturm Graz	6	3	1	2	7	11	−4	7	0–3	—	3–2	1–5
3	(Switzerland) Luzern	6	2	1	3	10	12	−2	5	0–3	0–1	—	3–2
4	(Hungary) Ferencváros	6	1	0	5	9	12	−3	2	0–1	0–1	2–4	—

Source: mogiel.net
Rules for classification: 1) points; 2) goal difference; 3) number of goals scored.

=== Group 12 ===
Pos	Team	Pld	W	D	L	GF	GA	GD	Pts
1	(East Germany) Carl Zeiss Jena	6	4	1	1	10	3	+7	9
2	(Sweden) ÖIS	6	3	2	1	9	4	+5	8
3	(Czechoslovakia) RH Cheb	6	2	1	3	11	13	−2	5
4	(West Germany) Saarbrücken	6	1	0	5	8	18	−10	2

Rules for classification: 1) points; 2) goal difference; 3) number of goals scored.

== See also ==
- 1986–87 European Cup
- 1986–87 European Cup Winners' Cup
- 1986–87 UEFA Cup
