= Björn Nilsson (footballer) =

Swedish footballer

Personal information
- Full name: Björn Nilsson
- Date of birth: 8 April 1960 (age 66)
- Place of birth: Malmö, Sweden
- Position: Midfielder

Senior career*
Years	Team	Apps	(Gls)
1979–1986	Malmö FF	134	(28)
1986–1991	Young Boys	107	(24)
1991–1993	FC Monthey	29	(9)
1993–1994	Landskrona BoIS	22	(1)
Total		292	(62)

International career
1982–1987	Sweden	16	(1)
- * Club domestic league appearances and goals

Björn Nilsson (born 8 April 1960) is a Swedish former footballer who played as a midfielder.
