= Tarcisio Ostini =

Swiss footballer (born 1958)

Personal information
- Date of birth: 12 June 1958 (age 68)
- Position: Defender

Senior career*
| Years | Team | Apps | (Gls) |
| 1981–1987 | AC Bellinzona | | |
- * Club domestic league appearances and goals

Tarcisio Ostini (born 12 June 1958) is a retired Swiss football defender.
