= Zlatko Dupovac =

Yugoslav and Bosnian footballer (1952–2025)

Personal information
- Date of birth: 14 July 1952
- Place of birth: Sarajevo, PR Bosnia and Herzegovina, FPR Yugoslavia
- Date of death: 3 January 2025 (aged 72)
- Place of death: Switzerland
- Position: Forward

Youth career
- Sarajevo

Senior career*
Years	Team	Apps	(Gls)
1968–1969	Radnik Hadžići	19	(10)
1969–1978	Sarajevo	120	(17)
1972–1973	→ Borac Banja Luka (loan)	28	(9)
1978–1979	Brühl SG	24	(8)
1979–1981	St. Gallen	39	(18)
1981–1987	Wettingen	61	(20)
- * Club domestic league appearances and goals

Zlatko Dupovac (14 July 1952 – 3 January 2025) was a Yugoslav and Bosnian professional footballer who played as a forward.

== Club career ==
Born in Sarajevo, Dupovac, a graduate of the FK Sarajevo youth system, started his professional career with local minnows, Radnik Hadžići, in 1968. After one season with the club, he transferred back to Sarajevo where he spent nine seasons. He spent the 1972–73 season on loan with Borac Banja Luka. In the summer of 1978 he transferred to the Swiss Super League, where he spent the next nine years playing for Brühl SG, St. Gallen and Wettingen, respectively.

== Death ==
Dupovac died on 3 January 2025, at the age of 72.
