= Bremgarten =

Bremgarten may refer to:

== Places ==
=== Germany ===
- Bremgarten, Hartheim am Rhein, part of Hartheim am Rhein, Baden-Württemberg

=== Switzerland ===
- Bremgarten bei Bern, in the canton of Bern
- Bremgarten, Aargau, in the canton of Aargau
- Bremgarten District, a district in the canton of Aargau

== Other ==
- Airport Bremgarten (IATA: EDTG), a former World War II airport near Bremgarten, Hartheim am Rhein
- Bremgarten Castle, a castle in the municipality of Bremgarten bei Bern
- Circuit Bremgarten, a former motor racing track near Bremgarten bei Bern
- FC Bremgarten, a football team in the Swiss 2. Liga
