= Leo Refalo =

Maltese footballer

Personal information
- Date of birth: 24 November 1962 (age 63)
- Place of birth: Ħamrun, Malta
- Position: Striker

Senior career*
Years	Team	Apps	(Gls)
1979–1990	Ħamrun Spartans	110	(50)
1990–1991	Birkirkara	14	(0)
1991–1994	Valletta	32	(10)
- Pietà Hotspurs

International career
1988	Malta	1	(0)
- * Club domestic league appearances and goals

Leo Refalo (born 24 November 1962 in Ħamrun) is a Maltese retired footballer.

== Club career ==
Refalo played the majority of his career for hoemtown club Ħamrun Spartans as a midfielder. He was the league's top goalscorer in 1983 and holds the record of most goals in one Maltese Premier League game for the club (alongside Stefan Sultana), when he scored five against Żebbuġ Rangers in 1989.

== International career ==
Refalo was capped once by Malta, when he came on as a substitute for David Carabott in a June 1988 European Championship qualification against Wales.

== Personal life ==
His twin brother Gejtu played for Ħamrun Spartans and Naxxar Lions in the Maltese top tier. His son Quilin played for Pietà Hotspurs.

== Honours ==
Ħamrun Spartans

- Maltese Premier League: 1983, 1987,1988
- Maltese FA Trophy: 1983, 1984, 1987, 1988, 1989

Valletta

- Maltese Premier League: 1992
