= Martin Weber (footballer) =

Swiss footballer and manager (born 1957)

Personal information
- Date of birth: 24 October 1957 (age 69)
- Place of birth: Bargen
- Position: Defender

Senior career*
Years	Team	Apps	(Gls)
1975–1979	FC Biel-Bienne		
1983–1987	FC Basel		
1987–1990	Servette FC		
1979–1995	BSC Young Boys		

International career
- Switzerland u-21
1981–1989	Switzerland	32	(1)

Managerial career
- 1996–1999: FC Solothurn
- 1999: BSC Young Boys
- * Club domestic league appearances and goals

Martin Weber (born 24 October 1957) is a retired Swiss football defender and later manager.

== Honours ==
- Swiss Super League:
  - Winner: 1985–86
- Swiss Super Cup:
  - Winner: 1986
- Swiss Cup:
  - Winner: 1986–87
