= Philippe Perret =

Swiss footballer and manager (born 1961)

Personal information
- Date of birth: 17 October 1961 (age 65)
- Position: Defensive midfielder

Senior career*
Years	Team	Apps	(Gls)
1978–1998	Neuchâtel Xamax	540	(27)

International career
- Switzerland u-21
1983–1988	Switzerland	14	(0)

Managerial career
- 2000–2001: Yverdon-Sport
- 2002–2004: Fribourg
- 2004–2007: FC La Chaux-de-Fonds
- 2008–2013: FC Biel-Bienne
- 2017–2019: FC Biel-Bienne (youth)
- * Club domestic league appearances and goals

Philippe Perret (born 17 October 1961) is a Swiss football manager and former player who played as a defensive midfielder. He spent his entire senior career with Neuchâtel Xamax.

== Honours ==
Neuchâtel Xamax

- Swiss Super League: 1986–87, 1987–88
- Swiss Super Cup: 1987, 1990
