= Magnus Johansson (footballer, born 1964) =

Swedish football player and manager (born 1964)

Personal information
- Date of birth: 5 October 1964 (age 62)
- Place of birth: Gothenburg, Sweden
- Position: Midfielder

Senior career*
Years	Team	Apps	(Gls)
1984–1990	IFK Göteborg		
1991–1992	Västra Frölunda		
1993–1996	Brann		
1997–1998	Haugesund		

Managerial career
- 1999–2001: Nord
- 2002–2005: Løv-Ham
- 2006: Bryne
- 2006–2011: Åsane
- * Club domestic league appearances and goals

Magnus Johansson (born 5 October 1964) is a Swedish football coach and former footballer who played for IFK Göteborg, Brann and Västra Frölunda.

== Playing career ==
Johansson won the UEFA Cup in 1987 and two Swedish championships with IFK Göteborg.

In 1993, he debuted for the Brann where he also was captain for two years before he transferred to the newly promoted team Haugesund in 1997. He played more than 400 games at the highest level in Norway and Sweden. Johansson didn't earn any caps for Sweden, but he represented Sweden at the youth national team and the Olympic team.

== Coaching career ==
After his active career, Johansson started coaching in the Norwegian Third Division-team SK Nord in 1999, which managed promotion the Second Division the first season under his command. In 2002, he was hired by Løv Ham from Bergen, and his breakthrough came in 2004 when he led them to promotion to the Adeccoliga. After retaining their spot in the Adeccoliga, Johansson became one of the foremost coaches in Norway, with offers from the Tippeliga clubs Vålerenga and Molde and the Adeccoliga club Bryne. He chose Bryne and became their head coach from the 2006 season. He resigned after just a half season in Bryne, after several disappointing results. On 16 July 2007, he signed with the third-tier team Åsane Fotball. Åsane was almost relegated to the Third Division with 13 points behind safe position with 9 games to play when Magnus Johansson came to the club but he saved the team in the Second Division. Åsane had a tough start in the 2008-season, but finished sixth in their group. Johansson coached Åsane for three more years, before he resigned on 8 November 2011 to start as responsible for player development in Hordaland Fotballkrets from 2012 to 2014.
