= Manfred Braschler =

Swiss footballer (1958–2002)

Manfred Braschler (8 October 1958 – 31 July 2002) was a Swiss footballer who played as a winger. Born in Austria, he was a Switzerland international.

== Early life ==
Braschler grew up in Imst, Austria, where he was regarded as a football prospect.

== Playing career ==
During his playing career, Braschler was nicknamed "Mani" in Switzerland. At club level, he played for SSW Innsbruck, St. Gallen and FC Chur. He made 22 appearances for the Switzerland national team. He mainly operated as a left winger and was known for his speed.

== Post-playing career ==
After retiring from professional football, Braschler owned a cleaning company.

== Personal life ==
Braschler was divorced from his first wife and had a son. From 1995 until his death he was in a relationship with his second wife Sandra whom he married in 2001. He died on 31 July 2002 in Goldach, Switzerland by hanging himself inside his garage. He had made several suicide attempts beforehand. According to his widow he couldn't cope with a life away from professional football.
