= Thomas Bickel =

Swiss footballer (born 1963)

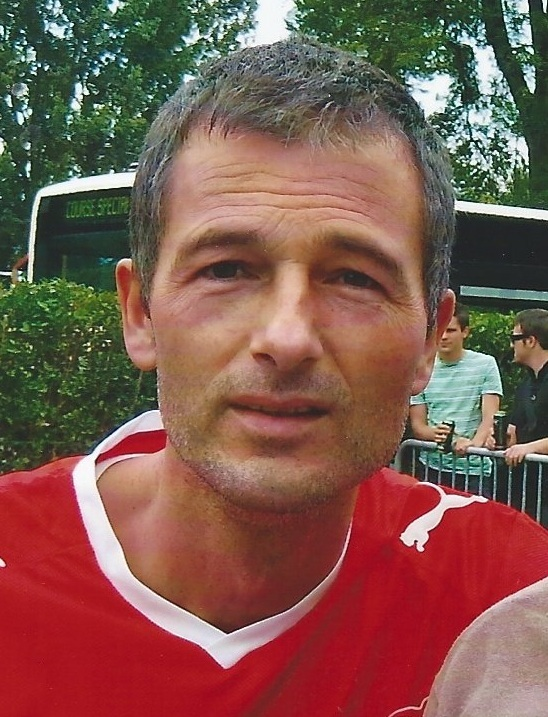

Personal information
- Date of birth: 6 October 1963 (age 63)
- Place of birth: Aarberg, Switzerland
- Height: 1.84 m (6 ft 0 in)
- Position: Midfielder

Senior career*
Years	Team	Apps	(Gls)
1984–1985	Biel-Bienne	29	(6)
1985–1988	FC Zürich	92	(19)
1988–1995	Grasshoppers	198	(24)
1995–1997	Vissel Kobe	75	(21)
Total		394	(70)

International career
1986–1995	Switzerland	52	(5)
- * Club domestic league appearances and goals

Thomas Bickel (born 6 October 1963) is chief scout for FC Zürich and a former Switzerland national football team midfielder.

He was capped 52 times including three games at the 1994 FIFA World Cup, and scored five goals for the Switzerland national team between 1986 and 1995.

Working mostly as an entrepreneur in gastronomy after his career, he returned to football for good in 2013 as head of scouting at FC Zürich where he had started his professional career as a player in 1985. From 2016 to 2020 he was part of the club management as head of the sport department. Subsequently he returned to his former role as head of scouting.

== Career statistics ==
=== Club ===
Appearances and goals by club, season and competition
Club	Season	League		
Club	Season	Division	Apps	Goals
Biel-Bienne	1984–85	Nationalliga B	29	6
Zürich	1985–86	Nationalliga A	30	3
Zürich	1986–87	Nationalliga A	29	8
Zürich	1987–88	Nationalliga A	33	8
Zürich	Total		92	19
Grasshopper Zürich	1988–89	Nationalliga A	24	2
Grasshopper Zürich	1989–90	Nationalliga A	30	2
Grasshopper Zürich	1990–91	Nationalliga A	33	1
Grasshopper Zürich	1991–92	Nationalliga A	31	7
Grasshopper Zürich	1992–93	Nationalliga A	32	3
Grasshopper Zürich	1993–94	Nationalliga A	29	7
Grasshopper Zürich	1994–95	Nationalliga A	19	2
Grasshopper Zürich	Total		198	24
Vissel Kobe	1995	Football League	25	6
Vissel Kobe	1996	Football League	30	12
Vissel Kobe	1997	J1 League	20	3
Vissel Kobe	Total		75	21
Career total			394	70

=== International ===
Appearances and goals by national team and year
National team	Year	Apps	Goals
Switzerland	1986	5	1
Switzerland	1987	6	0
Switzerland	1988	5	0
Switzerland	1989	1	0
Switzerland	1990	4	1
Switzerland	1991	7	0
Switzerland	1992	5	1
Switzerland	1993	3	0
Switzerland	1994	11	2
Switzerland	1995	5	0
Total		52	5
