= Andreas Gretschnig =

Austrian footballer (born 1960)

Personal information
- Date of birth: 16 December 1960 (age 65)
- Place of birth: Innsbruck, Austria
- Height: 1.82 m (6 ft 0 in)
- Position: Midfielder

Senior career*
Years	Team	Apps	(Gls)
1979–1985	SSW Innsbruck	109	(23)
1985–1987	FC Zürich	45	(12)
1987–1990	Wiener Sport-Club		
1990–1991	Admira Wacker Wien		
1991	SR Donaufeld		
1992–1996	FC Kufstein		
1996–1997	WSG Wattens		

International career
1984–1986	Austria	2	(0)
- * Club domestic league appearances and goals

Andreas Gretschnig (born 16 December 1960) is an Austrian former professional footballer who played as a midfielder. He made two appearances for the Austria national team from 1984 to 1986.
