= Walter Pellegrini =

Swiss footballer (born 1959)

Personal information
- Full name: Walter Pellegrini
- Date of birth: 30 June 1959 (age 67)
- Place of birth: Switzerland
- Height: 1.78 m (5 ft 10 in)
- Position: Striker

Senior career*
Years	Team	Apps	(Gls)
1978–1980	FC Chiasso		
1980–1982	Neuchâtel Xamax		
1982–1985	Lausanne Sports		
1985–1986	FC St. Gallen		
1986–1987	FC Zürich		
1987–1988	AC Bellinzona		
- * Club domestic league appearances and goals

Walter Pellegrini (born 30 June 1959) is a Swiss retired footballer who played as a centre forward.
