= Rudolf Landolt =

Swiss footballer (born 1957)

Vincent Fournier
Personal information
- Date of birth: 31 October 1957 (age 68)
- Position: Defender

Senior career*
Years	Team	Apps	(Gls)
1977–1991	FC Zürich	353	(13)

International career
- Switzerland U-21
- * Club domestic league appearances and goals

Rudolf Landolt (born 31 October 1957) is a retired Swiss football defender.
