= Urs Schönenberger =

Swiss footballer and manager (born 1959)

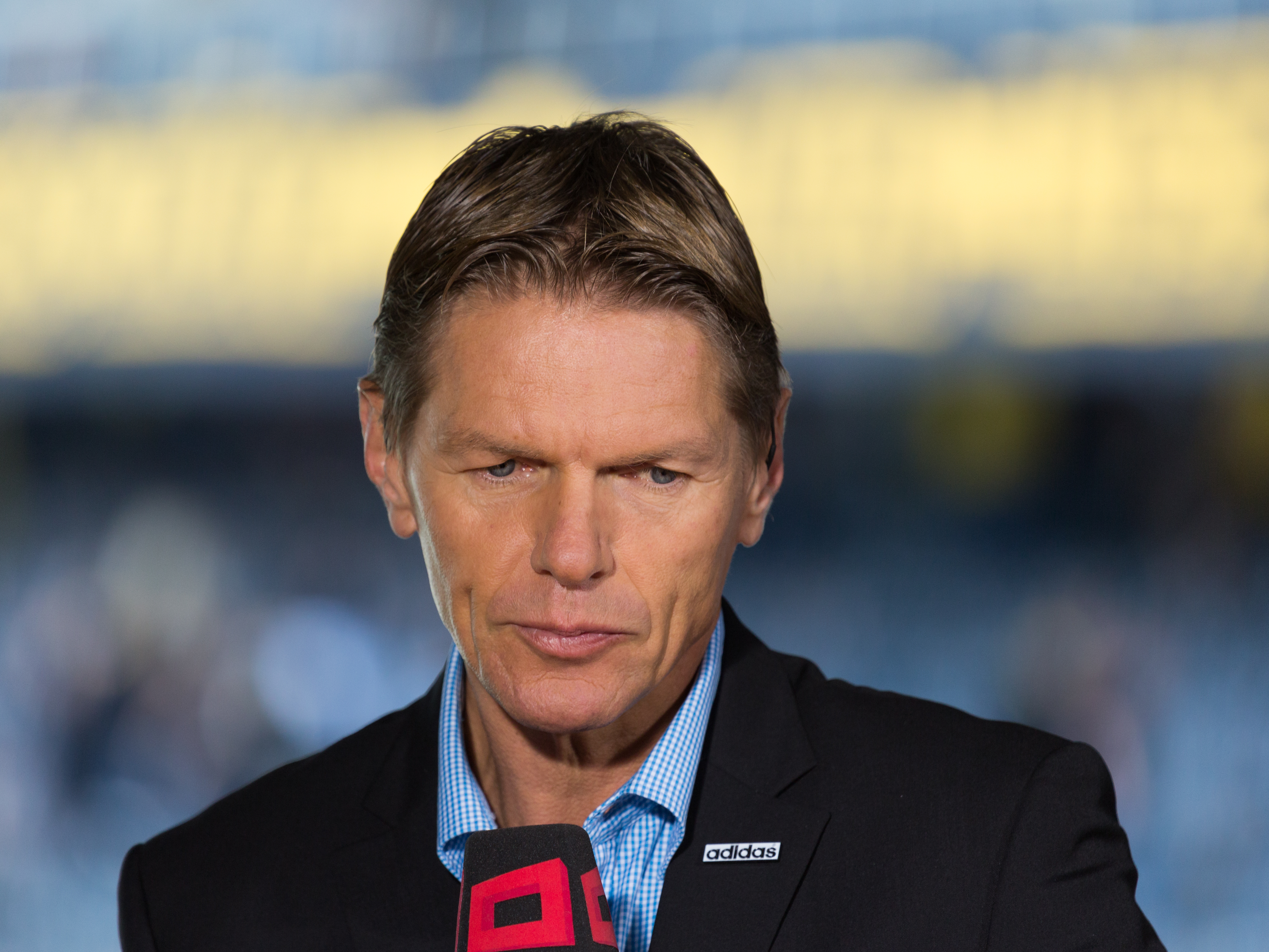

Personal information
- Full name: Urs Schönenberger
- Date of birth: 21 February 1959 (age 67)
- Place of birth: Zürich, Switzerland
- Height: 1.93 m (6 ft 4 in)

Senior career*
Years	Team	Apps	(Gls)
1980–1986	FC Zürich		
1986–1987	AC Bellinzona		
1987–1994	FC Luzern		
1994–1996	SC Kriens		
1996–1998	FC Baden		

Managerial career
- 1998–2001: FC Zürich (assistant)
- 2001–2002: FC Winterthur
- 2002–2003: SC Kriens
- 2003: FC Luzern
- 2004: SC Young Fellows Juventus
- 2005–2006: FC Thun
- 2006: FC Aarau
- 2007–2008: SC Young Fellows Juventus
- 2008–2009: SC Rheindorf Altach
- 2011: FC Wohlen
- 2012: SC Kriens
- * Club domestic league appearances and goals

Urs Schönenberger (born 21 February 1959) is a Swiss football manager and former player.
