= 1986–87 FC Basel season =

FC Basel
1986–87 season
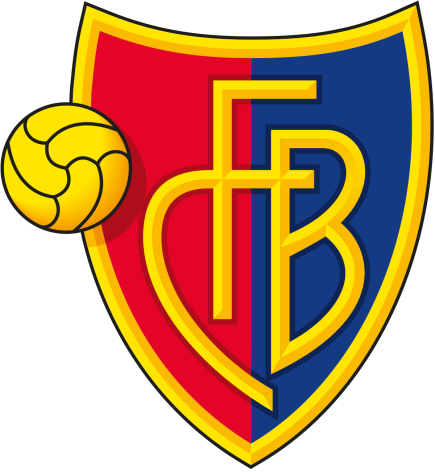
- Chairman: Peter Max Sutter
- Manager: Helmut Benthaus
- Ground: St. Jakob Stadium, Basel
- Nationalliga A: 12th of 16
- Swiss Cup: Round of 16
- Top goalscorer: League: Peter Nadig (13); All: Peter Nadig (14)
- Highest home attendance: 12,000 on 25 October 1986 vs. Young Boys
- Lowest home attendance: 1,300 on 12 June 1987 vs. Sion
- Average home league attendance: 4,426

The Fussball Club Basel 1893 1986–87 season was their 93rd season since the club's founding. It was their 41st consecutive season in the top flight of Swiss football since they achieved promotion in the 1945–46 season. FC Basel played their home games in the St. Jakob Stadium.

== Overview ==
=== Pre-season ===
Peter Max Sutter was the club's newly appointed chairman. He had taken over from local businessman Urs Gribi, who had held this position over the previous three seasons. The club was faced by financial problems that increased during the last few years: the cash flow was low and players wages and security costs were continually rising. Sutter's main concern was to find new sponsors that got more complicated at the time. Helmut Benthaus had returned as first team manager the season before, this was his second consecutive season as coach. Several players left. The defenders Ertan Irizik moved on to St. Gallen, Francois Laydu moved on to Locarno, Stefano Ceccaroni moved to FC Laufen and Alfred Lüthi moved on to Grenchen. Further the midfielder Martin Jeitziner moved on to Young Boys, and the two forwards Beat Sutter moved on to Xamax and Ruedi Zbinden moved on to Grenchen. Some new players signed in to the club. Stefan Bützer had won the championship with the Young Boys the previous season. Jean-Pierre François and Markus Füri both were from local team Concordia Basel and Markus Hodel from local club Nordstern Basel. Bruno Hänni was from lower tier club FC Oensingen and reserve goalkeeper Patrick Mäder was from lower tier club Schaffhausen.

In this season Basel played a total of 52 games (30 matches were played in the domestic league and another four in the promotion/relegation play-offs, three games were in the Swiss Cup and 15 were friendly matches). Of their test games, nine ended with a victory, four were drawn and two ended with a defeat. During these games the team scored 42 goals and conceded 18. All the test games were played away from home.

=== Domestic league ===
The aim of the Swiss Football Association (SFV) in the season 1986–87 the Nationalliga A was to reduce the number of clubs in the top flight of Swiss football from 16 to just 12. At the end of the season the top 10 clubs were to remain in the top division and the 15th and 16th club to be relegated directly to the Nationalliga B. Four teams from the Nationalliga A (in positions 11 to the 14) and four teams from the Nationalliga B (the top four positioned teams) contested a play-off round to determine the last two places in next season's Nationalliga A. Basel's announced aim was to defend their position in the top flight of Swiss football during the main season and to achieve a position above a play-off positions.

Basel played a mediocre season, although they won only two of their first ten games, they were always placed in the middle of the table and kept this position after the winter break with three wins against lower placed teams. But then with seven defeats in the last ten games meant that they slipped in the table. Basel ended the main season with only 24 points in 12th position and so had to enter into this knock-out round. Here they were drawn against Bulle (3rd in the Nationallaiga B) in a two-legged promotion/relegation play-off semi-final. Both games ended with a two all draw, but decisively Basel defeated Bulle 5–3 on penalties. Basel then defeated FC Wettingen 8–2 on aggregate (1–2 and 7–0) in one of the two promotion/relegation finals and managed to save their slot in the highest tier of Swiss football. The team completed their aim, but the play-off round was an undesirable addition to the season. Xamax won the championship winning 48 points and qualified for the 1987–88 European Cup. Grasshopper Club and Sion ended second and third and thus qualified for the 1987–88 UEFA Cup.

=== Swiss Cup ===
In the Swiss Cup Basel entered in the round of 64 with an away game against Nationalliga B team FC Köniz and Basel won 9–2. They continued to the round of 32 in which they had a home game against third tier Fribourg and this was won 3–1. The cup season ended in the round 16 as Basel lost the home game against lower classed Kriens. Young Boys and Servette advanced to the final, which was traditionally always played in the Wankdorf Stadium in Bern. After 90 minutes the game ended 1–1, but YB won the trophy 4–2 after extra time and qualified for the 1987–88 Cup Winners' Cup.

== Players ==
Note: Flags indicate national team as defined under FIFA eligibility rules; some limited exceptions apply. Players may hold more than one non-FIFA nationality.

No.	Pos.	Nation	Player
1	GK	SUI	Urs Suter
2	DF	SUI	André Ladner
3	DF	SUI	Dominique Herr
4	DF	GER	Gerd Strack
5	DF	SUI	Fredy Grossenbacher
6	DF	SUI	Marco Schällibaum
7	MF	SUI	Stefan Bützer (from Young Boys)
8	DF	SUI	Fabio Ghisoni (from FC Lengnau)
9	MF	GER	Thomas Hauser
10	MF	SUI	Erni Maissen
11	FW	SUI	Jean-Pierre François (from Concordia Basel)

No.	Pos.	Nation	Player
12	DF	SUI	Markus Hodel (from Nordstern Basel)
13	DF	SUI	Bruno Hänni (from FC Oensingen)
14	MF	ESP	Enrique Mata
15	MF	SUI	Peter Nadig
16	FW	SUI	Luiz Gonçalo (from Wettingen)
17	MF	SUI	René Botteron
18	FW	SUI	Adrian Knup
19	DF	SUI	Markus Füri (from Concordia Basel)
—	DF	GER	Thomas Süss
—	GK	SUI	Dominik Leder
—	GK	SUI	Patrick Mäder (from Schaffhausen)

Players who left the squad

Note: Flags indicate national team as defined under FIFA eligibility rules; some limited exceptions apply. Players may hold more than one non-FIFA nationality.

No.	Pos.	Nation	Player
—	GK	SUI	Thomas Paul
—	DF	SUI	Ertan Irizik (to St. Gallen)
—	DF	SUI	Francois Laydu (to Locarno)
—	DF	SUI	Alfred Lüthi (to Grenchen)
—	DF	SUI	Stefano Ceccaroni (to FC Laufen)

No.	Pos.	Nation	Player
—	MF	SUI	Martin Jeitziner (to Young Boys)
—	FW	SUI	Beat Sutter (to Xamax)
—	FW	SUI	Ruedi Zbinden (to Grenchen)
—	MF	SUI	Heinz Reichen
—	MF	SUI	Felix Rudin

== Results ==
Legend

Win Draw Loss Postponed

=== Friendly matches ===
==== Pre- and mid-season ====
5 July 1986 Pre-season	FC Aarwangen (Switzerland)	2–9	(Switzerland) Basel	Hubel, Aarwangen
15:00	Huser 15' (pen. 1:2); Huser 48' (2:6)	FCB summary	9' (0:1) Nadig; 13' (0:2) Maissen; 20' (1:3) Strack; 30' (1:4) Maissen; 33' (1:5) Schällibaum; 43' (1:6) Bützer; 59' (2:7) Herr; 63' (2:8) Ghisoni; 72' (2:9) Füri	Attendance: 500; Referee: (Switzerland) Serge Muhmenthaler (Grenchen)

11 July 1986 Pre-season	Solothurn (Switzerland)	1–2	(Switzerland) Basel	Lachen, Büren an der Aare
19:00	Largiadèr 84' (1:2)	FCB summary	72' (0:1) François; 78' (0:2) Ghisoni	Attendance: 400; Referee: (Switzerland) Manfred Schlup, (Grenchen)

15 July 1986 Wyler Cup round 1	Young Boys (Switzerland)	1–1	(Switzerland) Basel	Wyler, Bern
19:00	Lunde 80' (1:1)	FCB summary	59' (0:1) Schällibaum	Attendance: 1,600; Referee: (Switzerland) Georges Sandoz (Corcelles-Cormondrèche, Neuchâtel)

17 July 1986 Uhrencup semi-final	Grenchen (Switzerland)	1–3	(Switzerland) Basel	Stadion Brühl, Grenchen
17:00	Mautone 34' (1:1)	FCB summary	10' (0:1) Strack; 50' (1:2) Füri; 71' (1:3) Maissen	Attendance: 1,800; Referee: (Switzerland) Gottfried Friedrich (Seedorf, Uri)
Note: The Uhrencup is a former club football tournament that was held annually in Grenchen in Switzerland.

19 July 1986 Uhrencup final	Basel (Switzerland)	1–0	(Switzerland) Grasshopper Club	Stadion Brühl, Grenchen
19:00	Nadig 55' (1:0)	FCB summary		Attendance: 2,700; Referee: (Switzerland) Willi Jaus (Feldmeilen)
Note: The Uhrencup is a former club football tournament that was held annually in Grenchen in Switzerland.

22 July 1986 Wyler Cup round 2	Basel (Switzerland)	0–3	(Switzerland) Aarau	Wyler, Bern
19:00		FCB summary	5' (0:1) Schärer; 32' (0:2) Christensen; 58' (0:3) Christensen	Attendance: 1,600; Referee: (Switzerland) Gottfried Friedrich (Seedorf, Uri)

26 July 1986 Pre-season	Winterthur (Switzerland)	2–2	(Switzerland) Basel	Schützenwiese, Winterthur
19:30	Vöge 59' (pen. 1:2); Klein 85' (2:2)	FCB summary	9' (0:1) Ghisoni; 42' (0:2) Bützer	Attendance: 600; Referee: (Switzerland) Kurt Röthlisberger (Suhr, Aargau)

2 August 1986 Pre-season	Basel (Switzerland)	1–2	(Switzerland) Grasshopper Club	Moos, Balsthal
18:30	Knup 82' (1:2)	FCB summary	32' (0:1) Ponte; 40' (0:2) Gren	Attendance: 1,000; Referee: (Switzerland) Francis Fischer (Arch)

24 September 1986 Mid-season	FV Lörrach (Germany)	1–6	(Switzerland) Basel	Lörrach
17:30	Goal	FCB summary	Goal

==== Winter break ====
February 1987 Training camp	Basel (Switzerland)	0–0	(Germany) Bayern München	Lanzarote
		FCB summary
Note: Game during training camp in Lanzarote. Sometime between February 2nd and 5th, 1987

February 1987 Training camp	Basel (Switzerland)	5–1	(Spain) Selection Lanzarote	Lanzarote
	Goal	FCB summary	Goal
Note: Game during training camp in Lanzarote. Sometime between February 2nd and 5th, 1987

11 February 1987 Winter break	Freiburger FC (Germany)	0–2	(Switzerland) Basel	Möslestadion, Freibzrg
15:30		FCB summary	75' (0:1) Reichen; 86' (0:2) Knup

15 February 1987 Winter break	FC Olten (Switzerland)	2–4	(Switzerland) Basel	Kleinholz, Olten
14:20	(1:1) (2:4)	FCB summary	8' (0:1) Bützer; 24' (pen. 1:2) Knup; 48' (pen. 1:3) Knup; 82' (1:4) Gonçalo

18 February 1987 Winter break	FC Mulhouse (France)	0–4	(Switzerland) Basel	Stade de la Frontière, Saint-Louis, Haut-Rhin
19:00		FCB summary	2' (0:1) Ghisoni; 5' (0:2) Maissen; 25' (0:3) Maissen; 43' (0:4) Knup

21 February 1987 Winter break	Chiasso (Switzerland)	2–2	(Switzerland) Basel	Stadio Comunale, Chiasso
14:00	Moro 30' (1:1); Sordelli 75' (2:2)	FCB summary	15' (0:1) Knup; 42' (pen. 1:2) Knup	Attendance: 150; Referee: (Switzerland) Francesco Bianchi (Chiasso)

=== Nationalliga A ===
==== League matches ====
9 August 1986 Round 1	Sion	3–1	Basel	Stade Tourbillon, Sion
20:00	Balet 8' (1:0); Maissen 28' (o.g. 2:0); Rojević 34' (3:0)	FCB summary	(yellow card) 31' Ladner; 84' (3:1) Knup	Attendance: 6,200; Referee: (Switzerland) Franz Gächter (Aarau, Suhr, Aargau)

16 August 1986 Round 2	Vevey-Sports	2–2	Basel	Stade de Copet, Vevey
20:00	Zahnd 64' (1:0); Mann 77' (2:1)	FCB summary	71' (1:1) Knup; 88' (2:2) Strack	Attendance: 2,200; Referee: (Switzerland) Bruno Galler (Kirchdorf, Bern)
Note: First NLA appearances for Markus Füri (FCB) and the Argentinian Hugo Issa (Vevey).

23 August 1986 Round 3	Basel	3–1	Locarno	St. Jakob Stadium, Basel
17:30	Bützer (yellow card) 28'; Strack 62' (1:1); Maissen 66' (2:1); Knup 84' (3:1)	FCB summary	25' (0:1) Bachofner; (yellow card) 39' Laydu; (yellow card) 70' Giani	Attendance: 3,500; Referee: (Switzerland) Charles-Henri Morex (Bex)

30 August 1986 Round 4	Luzern	2–0	Basel	Stadion Allmend, Luzern
20:00	Baumann 10' (1:0); M. Müller 45' (2:0)	FCB summary	(yellow card) 14' Nadig; (yellow card) 29' Ladner	Attendance: 7,800; Referee: (Switzerland) Renzo Peduzzi (Roveredo)

3 September 1986 Round 5	Basel	5–3	Zürich	St. Jakob Stadium, Basel
20:00	Maissen 35' (1:0); Nadig 57' (2:2); Mata 62' (3:2); Bützer (yellow card) 63'; Maissen (yellow card) 71'; Nadig 76' (4:2); Maissen 86' (5:3)	FCZ summary FCB summary	36' (1:1) Bickel; 55' (pen. 1:2) Bickel; 79' (4:3) Rufer	Attendance: 5,500; Referee: (Switzerland) Georges Sandoz (Corcelles-Cormondrèche and Neuchâtel)
Note: First game on the new laid grass of the pitch.

6 September 1986 Round 6	Basel	0–0	Aarau	St. Jakob Stadium, Basel
17:30		FCB summary FCA summary	(yellow card) 69' Wassmer; (yellow card) 73' Schär	Attendance: 6,500; Referee: (Switzerland) Marcel Despland (Yverdon-les-Bains)
Note: Corners: 9:6. Poor refereeing.

13 September 1986 Round 7	Xamax	2–1	Basel	Stade de la Maladière (1924), Neuchâtel
20:00	Stielike 24' (1:0); Givens (yellow card) 49'; Herr 55' (o.g. 2:0)	FCB summary	60' (2:1) Strack; (yellow card) 71' Schällibaum	Attendance: 8,200; Referee: (Switzerland) Philippe Mercier (Pully)

27 September 1986 Round 8	Basel	1–1	Wettingen	St. Jakob Stadium, Basel
17:30	Nadig 44' (1:1); Schällibaum (yellow card) 81'	FCB summary	(yellow card) 8' Küng; (yellow card) 17' Peterhans; (yellow card) 19' Mullis; 39' (0:1) Hüsser	Attendance: 2,800; Referee: (Switzerland) Renzo Peduzzi (Roveredo)

4 October 1986 Round 9	St. Gallen	0–0	Basel	Espenmoos, St. Gallen
17:30	Hörmann (yellow card) 49'	FCB summary	(yellow card) 20' Füri; (yellow card) 44' Hodel	Attendance: 6,500; Referee: (Switzerland) Bruno Galler (Kirchdorf, Bern)
Note: Comer: 6:6 (2:2).

8 October 1986 Round 10	Basel	0–3	Grasshopper Club	St. Jakob Stadium, Basel
20:00		FCB summary	33' (0:1) Larsen; 38' (0:2) Matthey; 76' (pen. 0:3) Egli	Attendance: 7,500; Referee: (Switzerland) André Daina (Éclépens)

11 October 1986 Round 11	La Chaux-de-Fonds	0–2	Basel	Stade Charrière, La Chaux-de-Fonds
17:30	Meyer (yellow card) 62'	FCB summary	3' (0:1) Schällibaum; (yellow card) 38' Gonçalo; 56' (0:2) Knup; (yellow card) 67' Herr	Attendance: 700; Referee: (Switzerland) Manfred Schlup, (Grenchen)

25 October 1986 Round 12	Basel	1–0	Young Boys	St. Jakob Stadium, Basel
17:30	Mata (yellow card) 9'; Gonçalo 57' (pen. 1:0); Schällibaum (yellow card) 79'; Knup (yellow card) 87'	FCB summary	(yellow card) 89' Bamert	Attendance: 12,000; Referee: (Switzerland) Robert Süess (Luzern and Meggen)
Note: Swiss national team Daniel Jeandupeux was among the spectators. Free entry for all and that meant that the main stand was completely packed. Overall, the refereeing was correct. Corners: 5:7 (2:4).

2 November 1986 Round 13	Lausanne-Sport	4–3	Basel	Olympique de la Pontaise, Lausanne
14:30	Tachet 24' (1:1); Brodard (yellow card) 36'; Kaltaveridls 74' (2:3); Brodard 76' (3:3); Schürmann 89' (4:3)	FCB summary	9' (0:1) Nadig; (yellow card) 36' Strack; 66' (1:2) Strack; 71' (1:3) Knup	Attendance: 2,500; Referee: (Switzerland) Arturo Martino (Neukirch an der Thur)
Note: Corners: 8:9.

22 November 1986 Round 14	Basel	1–4	Servette	St. Jakob Stadium, Basel
17:30	Ladner (yellow card) 22'; Mata (yellow card) 45'; Strack 67' (1:3)	FCB summary	20' (0:1) Schnyder; 31' (0:2) Schnyder; 53' (0:3) Eriksen; 90' (1:4) Pavoni	Attendance: 2,700; Referee: (Switzerland) Jean-Claude Tagliabue

30 November 1986 Round 15	Bellinzona	1–0	Basel	Stadio Comunale Bellinzona, Bellinzona
14:30	Fargeon 40' (1:0)	FCB summary	(yellow card) 19' Schällibaum	Attendance: 8,000; Referee: (Switzerland) Philippe Mercier (Pully)
Note: Corners: 5:4.

1 March 1987 Round 16	Basel	1–1	Bellinzona	St. Jakob Stadium, Basel
14:30	Nadig 24' (1:0); Ladner (yellow card) 62'; Schällibaum (yellow card) 77'; Knup (yellow card) 79'	FCB summary	(yellow card) 28' Rodriguez; (yellow card) 53' Mellacina; (yellow card) 90' Tognlni; 90+2' (1:1) Türkyilmaz	Attendance: 3,500; Referee: (Switzerland) Bruno Galler (Kirchdorf, Bern)

7 March 1987 Round 17	Servette	2–1	Basel	Charmilles Stadium, Geneva
17:30	Eriksen 21' (1:0); Hasler 36' (2:0)	FCB summary	(yellow card) 31' Schällibaum; (yellow card) 39' Bützer; (yellow card) 56' Ladner; 68' (2:1) Ghisoni; (yellow card) 90' Hauser	Attendance: 3,200; Referee: (Switzerland) Franz Gächter (Aarau, Suhr, Aargau)
Note: Servette defender Pascal Cacciapaglia's 100th NLA game. Corners: 9:3.

15 March 1987 Round 18	Basel	4–3	Lausanne-Sport	St. Jakob Stadium, Basel
14:30	Strack 9' (1:1); Hauser 34' (2:1); Knup 67' (3:2); Hauser 69' (4:2); Süss (yellow card) 88'	FCB summary	4' (0:1) Schürmann; (yellow card) 14' El-Haddaoui; 52' (2:2) Fernandez; (yellow card) 81' Henry; 86' (4:3) Thychosen	Attendance: 4,300; Referee: (Switzerland) Freddy Philippoz (Sion)

21 March 1987 Round 19	Young Boys	0–1	Basel	Wankdorf Stadium, Bern
17:30		FCB summary	(yellow card) 37' Strack; (yellow card) 52' Herr; 90' (0:1) Bützer	Attendance: 5,000; Referee: (Switzerland) Willy Hänni, (Cugy)
Note: Corners 18:1 (5:1).

4 April 1987 Round 20	Basel	1–0	La Chaux-de-Fonds	St. Jakob Stadium, Basel
17:30	Hauser 73' (1:0)	FCB summary	(yellow card) 42' Amstutz; (yellow card) 53' Baur	Attendance: 2,000; Referee: (Switzerland) Gottfried Friedrich (Seedorf, Uri)
Note: Torrential rain throughout the entire match. Corners: 4:2 (2:1). Excellent refereeing.

11 April 1987 Round 21	Grasshopper Club	2–1	Basel	Hardturm, Zürich
17:30	Andermatt 11' (1:0); Koller 43' (2:0)	FCB summary	61' (2:1) Nadig	Attendance: 4,900; Referee: (Switzerland) Daniel Roduit (Sion)
Note: Fair game, no yellow cards.

18 April 1987 Round 22	Basel	3–4	St. Gallen	St. Jakob Stadium, Basel
17:30	Ladner (yellow card) 5'; Irizik (yellow card) 30'; Nadig 24' (1:1); Maissen 34' (2:1); Ladner 90+1' (3:4)	FCB summary	(yellow card) 10' Metzler; 17' (0:1) Hegi; 42' (2:2) Metzler; 50' (2:3) Metzler; 79' (o.g. 2:4) Süss	Attendance: 5,000; Referee: (Switzerland) Georges Sandoz (Corcelles-Cormondrèche, Neuchâtel)
Note: Corners: 13:7 (7:2).

25 April 1987 Round 23	Wettingen	1–2	Basel	Stadion Altenburg, Wettingen
20:00	Zbinden 4' (1:0); Germann (yellow card) 34'	FCB summary	19' (1:1) Bützer; 42' (1:2) Schällibaum; (yellow card) 58' Hauser; (yellow card) 63' Schällibaum; (yellow card) 73' Ghisoni	Attendance: 2,400; Referee: (Switzerland) Freddy Philippoz (Sion)
Note: Power outage in the first half (20th minute) resulted in a 28-minute interruption. Corners: 10:1 (5:1).

2 May 1987 Round 24	Basel	1–4	Xamax	St. Jakob Stadium, Basel
17:30	Nadig 19' (1:1); Strack (yellow card) 38'	FCB summary	13' (0:1) Jacobacci; (red card) 32' Jacobacci; 55' (1:2) Ben Haki; 97' (1:3) Mottiez; 90' (1:4) Mottiez	Attendance: 6,000; Referee: (Switzerland) Marco Raveglia (San Vittore)
Note: 100th NLA game for FCB goalkeeper Urs Suter. Corners: 6:6.

9 May 1987 Round 25	Aarau	2–1	Basel	Stadion Brügglifeld, Aarau
17:30	Schär (yellow card) 32'; Rufer 56' (1:1); Herberth 66' (pen. 2:1)	FCB summary FCA summary	41' (0:1) Hauser	Attendance: 6,200; Referee: (Switzerland) Claude Gachoud
Note: Corners: 13:2 (3:2).

16 May 1987 Round 26	Zürich	3–2	Basel	Letzigrund, Zürich
20:00	Kundert 57' (1:2); Studer 67' (2:2); Lüdi 83' (3:2)	FCZ summary FCB summary	35' (0:1) Nadig; 39' (0:2) Strack; (yellow card) 87' Bützer	Attendance: 3,300; Referee: (Switzerland) Philippe Mercier (Pully)
Note: Corners: 6:6 (3:3).

23 May 1987 Round 27	Basel	2–4	Luzern	St. Jakob Stadium, Basel
17:30	Herr (yellow card) 22'; Schällibaum 52' (1:3); Nadig 80' (2:3)	FCB summary	26' (0:1) Mohr; 28' (0:2) Mohr; 32' (0:3) Halter; (yellow card) 82' Mohr; 83' (2:4) Halter	Attendance: 2,700; Referee: (Switzerland) Freddy Philippoz (Sion)
Note: Corner: 5:5 (1:0).

30 May 1987 Round 28	Locarno	3–5	Basel	Stadio del Lido, Locarno
20:00	Gianfreda 21' (1:1); Fornera 56' (pen. 2:2); Arrigoni 77' (3:4)	FCB summary	3' (0:1) Knup; (yellow card) 26' Süss; 38' (1:2) Bützer; (red card) 50' Strack; 60' (pen. 2:3) Knup; 75' (2:4) Ladner; 90+1' (3:5) Maissen	Attendance: 4,500; Referee: (Switzerland) Arturo Martino (Neukirch an der Thur)

3 June 1987 Round 29	Basel	2–2	Vevey-Sports	St. Jakob Stadium, Basel
20:00	Grossenbacher (yellow card) 30'; Nadig 56' (1:2); Knup 77' (2:2)	FCB summary	42' (0:1) Gavillet; 51' (0:2) Gavillet; (yellow card) 67' Abega	Attendance: 1,500; Referee: (Switzerland) Georges Sandoz (Corcelles-Cormondrèche, Neuchâtel)

12 June 1987 Round 30	Basel	2–5	Sion	Stadion Schützenmatte, Basel
20:00	Herr 44' (1:4); Knup (penalty missed) 50′ Maissen 73' (2:5)	FCB summary	18' (0:1) Bregy; 30′ Cina; 30' (0:2) Cina; 35' (0:3) Cina; 43' (0:4) Cina; 59' (1:5) Albertoni	Attendance: 1,300; Referee: (Switzerland) Marcel Despland (Yverdon-les-Bains)
Note: First NLA match for Sion goalkeeper Marco Pascolo. 30th minute, FCB goalkeeper Dominik Leder saved the penalty-kick from Dominique Cina, but he scored from the rebound. 50th minute Marco Pascolo held the penalty-kick from Adrian Knup. First ever NLA goal scored by Dominique Herr and first NLA goal scored by Stefano Albertoni.

==== Final league table ====
Pos	Team	Pld	W	D	L	GF	GA	GD	Pts	Qualification
1	Xamax	30	21	6	3	75	27	+48	48	Swiss champions qualified for 1987–88 European Cup
2	Grasshopper Club	30	19	5	6	60	36	+24	43	qualified for 1987–88 UEFA Cup and entered 1987 Intertoto Cup
3	Sion	30	17	8	5	76	38	+38	42	qualified for 1987–88 UEFA Cup
4	Servette	30	16	4	10	65	44	+21	36	
5	Luzern	30	12	12	6	55	38	+17	36	
6	Zürich	30	12	12	6	52	44	+8	36	
7	St. Gallen	30	14	6	10	50	43	+7	34	
8	Lausanne-Sport	30	13	6	11	64	60	+4	32	entered 1987 Intertoto Cup
9	Bellinzona	30	10	11	9	42	39	+3	31	entered 1987 Intertoto Cup
10	Young Boys	30	10	8	12	47	45	+2	28	Swiss Cup winners qualified for 1987–88 Cup Winners' Cup
11	Aarau	30	9	8	13	37	42	−5	26	Play-out winners, remained in 1987–88 Nationalliga A
12	Basel	30	9	6	15	49	62	−13	24	Play-out winners, remained in 1987–88 Nationalliga A
13	Vevey Sports	30	6	8	16	31	72	−41	20	Play-out losers, relegated to 1987–88 Nationalliga B
14	Wettingen	30	6	7	17	31	48	−17	19	Play-out losers, relegated to 1987–88 Nationalliga B
15	Locarno	30	6	7	17	44	65	−21	19	Relegated to 1987–88 Nationalliga B
16	La Chaux-de-Fonds	30	1	4	25	22	97	−75	6	Relegated to 1987–88 Nationalliga B and entered 1987 Intertoto Cup

Source: rsssf.com
Rules for classification: 1) Points; 2) Goal difference; 3) Goals scored; 4) Head-to-head points; 5) Away goals scored; 6) Draw.

==== Nationalliga A/B: Play-outs ====
Semi-final

20 June 1987 First leg	Basel	2–2	Bulle	Stadion Schützenmatte, Basel
17:30	Nadig 7' (1:0); Grossenbacher (yellow card) 33'; Herr 88' (2:1)	FCB summary	84' (1:1) Mora; 90+4' (2:2) Mora	Attendance: 2,000; Referee: (Switzerland) Bruno Klötzli (Bévilard)
Note: Corners: 5:8

23 June 1987 Second leg	Bulle	2–2 (a.e.t.) (4–4 agg.) (3–5 p)	Basel	Stade de Bouleyres, Bulle
20:00	Sempedro 22' (1:0); Rössli 64' (2:1); Rumo (yellow card) 116'	FCB summary	(yellow card) 38' Ladner; 54' (1:1) Knup; (yellow card) 65' Hodel; 68' (2:2) François; (yellow card) 89' Füri	Attendance: 5,000; Referee: (Switzerland) René Kellenberger (Herisau)
	Penalties
	Aubonney (penalty scored); Sempedro (penalty scored); Hofer (penalty missed) } Lehnherr (penalty scored)		(penalty scored) Bützer; (penalty scored) Ladner; (penalty scored) Nadig; (penalty scored) Knup; (penalty scored) François

Basel win the penalty shoot-out and advance to final, Bulle remain in Nationalliga B

Final

27 June 1987 First leg	Wettingen	2–1	Basel	Stadion Altenburg, Wettingen
20:00	Bertelsen 81' (1:1); Rueda 90+1' (pen. 2:1)	FCB summary	(yellow card) 34' Süss; 79' (0:1) Nadig	Attendance: 4,600; Referee: (Switzerland) Renzo Peduzzi (Roveredo)

30 June 1987 Second leg	Basel	7–0 (8–2 agg.)	Wettingen	Stadion Schützenmatte, Basel
18:00	Maissen 23' (1:0); Ghisoni 32' (2:0); Maissen 37' (3:0); Bützer 40' (pen. 4:0); Maissen 51' (5:0); Maissen 60' (6:0); Grossenbacher 64' (7:0)	FCB summary	(yellow card) 50' Germann	Attendance: 5,000; Referee: (Switzerland) Renzo Peduzzi

Aggregate 8–2, Basel remain in Nationalliga A, Wettingen relegated

=== Swiss Cup ===
20 September 1986 Round 3	Köniz	2–9	Basel	Liebefeld-Hessgut, Liebefeld
16:30	Nadig 17' (o.g. 1:1); Bräm 76' (2:8)	FCB summary	6' (0:1) Maissen; 27' (1:2) Maissen; 29' (1:3) Maissen; 48' (1:4) Knup; 52' (1:5) Nadig; 59' (1:6) Schällibaum; 66' (1:7) Maissen; 68' (1:8) Schällibaum; 81' (2:9) Knup	Attendance: 750; Referee: (Switzerland) Serge Muhmenthaler
Note: Köniz played the 1986/87 season in the 1. Liga (third-tier). The composed referee Serge Muhmenteler himself played for FC Basel under coach Helmut Benthaus nine years earlier.

18 October 1986 Round 4	Basel	3–1	Fribourg	St. Jakob-Park, Basel
15:00	Mata 60' (1:0); Gonçalo 78' (2:1); Gonçalo 88' (3:1)	FCB summary	73' (1:1) Chassot	Attendance: 1,250; Referee: (Switzerland) Peter Kellenberger
Note: Fribourg played the 1986/87 season in the 1. Liga (third-tier). Corners: 6:3 (3:2). Fair game, no yellow cards.

11 November Round of 16	Basel	1–2	Kriens	St. Jakob-Park, Basel
20:00	Gonçalo 4' (1:0); Maissen (yellow card) 52'	FCB summary	(yellow card) 26' Zemp; 31' (1:1) Zemp; 65' (1:2) Zemp	Attendance: 1,500; Referee: (Switzerland) Manfred Schlup, (Grenchen)
Note: Kriens played the 1986/87 season in the NLB (second-tier).

== See also ==
- History of FC Basel
- List of FC Basel players
- List of FC Basel seasons

== Sources ==
- Rotblau: Jahrbuch Saison 2015/2016. Publisher: FC Basel Marketing AG. ISBN 978-3-7245-2050-4
- Die ersten 125 Jahre. Publisher: Josef Zindel im Friedrich Reinhardt Verlag, Basel. ISBN 978-3-7245-2305-5
- The FCB squad 1986–87 at fcb-archiv.ch
- 1986–87 at RSSSF
