= 1986–87 Neuchâtel Xamax FCS season =

Neuchâtel Xamax FCS
1986–87 season
- Manager: Gilbert Gress
- Stadium: Stade de la Maladière
- Nationalliga A: 1st
- Swiss Cup: Round of 16
- UEFA Cup: Second round
- Top goalscorer: League: Beat Sutter (14 goals); All: Beat Sutter (15 goals)

During the 1986–87 Swiss football season, Neuchâtel Xamax won the Nationalliga A, and also participated in the Swiss Cup and UEFA Cup. Xamax played their home games at Stade de la Maladière.

== Squad ==
The following is the list of the Xamax first team squad this season. It also includes players that were in the squad the day the domestic league season started, on 9 August 1986, but subsequently left the club after that date. Note: Flags indicate national team as defined under FIFA eligibility rules; some limited exceptions apply. Players may hold more than one non-FIFA nationality.

No.	Pos.	Nation	Player
—	GK	SUI	Joël Corminboeuf
—	DF	SUI	Daniel Fasel
—	DF	SUI	René Fluri
—	DF	SUI	Stéphane Forestier
—	DF	SUI	Alain Geiger
—	DF	SUI	Peter Küffer
—	DF	POR	Sérgio Ribeiro
—	DF	SUI	Claude Ryf
—	DF	GER	Uli Stielike
—	DF	SUI	Pierre Thévenaz
—	DF	CZE	Zdeněk Urban

No.	Pos.	Nation	Player
—	MF	SUI	Heinz Hermann
—	MF	SUI	Robert Lei-Ravello
—	MF	SUI	Patrice Mottiez
—	MF	SUI	Philippe Perret
—	FW	MAR	M'Jido Ben Haki
—	FW	SCO	Davie Dodds
—	FW	IRL	Don Givens
—	FW	SUI	Maurizio Jacobacci
—	FW	SUI	Robert Lüthi
—	FW	SUI	Beat Sutter
—	FW	SUI	Pascal Zaugg

== Competitions ==
=== Overall record ===
Competition	First match	Last match	Starting round	Final position	Record							
Competition	First match	Last match	Starting round	Final position	Pld	W	D	L	GF	GA	GD	Win %
Nationalliga A	9 August 1986	12 June 1987	Matchday 1	Winners	30	21	6	3	75	27	+48	70.00
Swiss Cup	20 September 1986	11 November 1986	Third round	Round of 16	3	2	0	1	11	5	+6	66.67
UEFA Cup	16 September 1986	5 November 1986	First round	Second round	4	2	2	0	6	2	+4	50.00
Total					37	25	8	4	92	34	+58	67.57

Source: Competitions

=== Nationaliga A ===
==== League matches ====
9 August 1986 Matchday 1	Aarau	0–5	Xamax	Stadion Brügglifeld, Aarau
17:30		FCA summary	Patrice MottiezMottiez 39'; Sutter 45', 64'; Urban 55'; Stielike 65'	Attendance: 8,000; Referee: (Switzerland) Freddy Philippoz (Sion)

16 August 1986 Matchday 2	Xamax	2–0	Lausanne-Sport	Stade de la Maladière, Neuchâtel
	Sutter 53'; Jacobacci 89'

23 August 1986 Matchday 3	Bellinzona	0–3	Xamax	Stadio Comunale Bellinzona, Bellinzona
			Jacobacci 17', 67'; Mottiez 36'

30 August 1986 Matchday 4	Xamax	1–1	Young Boys	Stade de la Maladière, Neuchâtel
	Hermann 30' (pen.)		Prytz 2'

3 September 1986 Matchday 5	La Chaux-de-Fonds	0–1	Xamax	Stade de la Charrière, La Chaux-de-Fonds
			Stielike 46'

6 September 1986 Matchday 6	Xamax	4–0	Zürich	Stade de la Maladière, Neuchâtel
	Thévenaz 20' (1:0); Sutter 54' (2:0) (Lüdi) 62' (o.g.); Hermann 67' (pen.); Urban (yellow card)	FCZ summary	(yellow card) Pellegrini; (yellow card) Stoob; (yellow card) Kundert	Attendance: 9.100; Referee: (Switzerland) Renzo Peduzzi (Roveredo)

13 September 1986 Matchday 7	Xamax	2–1	Basel	Stade de la Maladière, Neuchâtel
20:00	Stielike 24' (1:0); Givens (yellow card) 49'; Herr 55' (o.g.)	FCB summary	60' (2:1) Strack; (yellow card) 71' Schällibaum	Attendance: 8,200; Referee: (Switzerland) Philippe Mercier (Pully)

27 September 1986 Matchday 8	Grasshopper	1–0	Xamax	Hardturm, Zürich
	Sutter 86'

4 October 1986 Matchday 9	Xamax	1–1	Servette	Stade de la Maladière, Neuchâtel
	Lei-Ravello 51'		Eriksen 51'

8 October 1986 Matchday 10	Xamax	3–1	Wettingen	Stade de la Maladière, Neuchâtel
	Lüthi 40', 78'; Lei-Ravello 80' (pen.)		Heuberger 90+1'

11 October 1986 Matchday 11	Sion	0–1	Xamax	Stade de Tourbillon, Sion
			Lüthi 61'

25 October 1986 Matchday 12	Luzern	2–1	Xamax	Stadion Allmend, Lucerne
	Wehrli 18'; Torfason 75'		Widmer 45' (o.g.)

1 November 1986 Matchday 13	Xamax	7–2	Locarno	Stade de la Maladière, Neuchâtel
	Lüthi 5', 16', 51'; Sutter 45'; Lei-Ravello 64' (pen.), 74' (pen.); Hermann 90' (pen.)		Tedeschi 57'; Tami 64'

23 November 1986 Matchday 14	St. Gallen	0–2	Xamax	Espenmoos, St. Gallen
			Sutter 55', 72'

29 November 1986 Matchday 15	Xamax	3–0	Vevey	Stade de la Maladière, Neuchâtel
	Lei-Ravello 37'; Mottiez 63'; Sutter 72'

28 February 1987 Matchday 16	Vevey	2–4	Xamax	Stade de Copet, Vevey
	Ben Brahim 66'; Abega 72'		Urban 8'; Lüthi 10', 50'; Ryf 33'

7 March 1987 Matchday 17	Xamax	3–0	St. Gallen	Stade de la Maladière, Neuchâtel
	Sutter 18', 64'; Urban 24'

15 March 1987 Matchday 18	Locarno	0–2	Xamax	Stadio del Lido, Locarno
			Sutter 53'; Lüthi 87'

21 March 1987 Matchday 19	Xamax	2–2	Luzern	Stade de la Maladière, Neuchâtel
	Stielike 63'; Ryf 66'		Grétarsson 8'; Halter 48'

4 April 1987 Matchday 20	Xamax	3–2	FC Sion	Stade de la Maladière, Neuchâtel
	Lei-Ravello 27'; Sutter 54'; Lüthi 72'		Débonnaire 58'; Bouderbala 60'

11 April 1987 Matchday 21	Wettingen	1–1	Xamax	Stadion Altenburg, Wettingen
	Heuberger 40'		Mottiez 48'

20 April 1987 Matchday 22	Servette	3–1	Xamax	Stade des Charmilles, Geneva
	Hasler 9'; Kok 20'; Eriksen 71' (pen.)		Hermann 43'

25 April 1987 Matchday 23	Xamax	4–1	Grasshopper	Stade de la Maladière, Neuchâtel
	Lei-Ravello 14'; Jacobacci 61'; Sutter 71'; Ben Haki 84'		Ponte 26'

2 May 1987 Matchday 24	Basel	1–4	Xamax	St. Jakob Stadium, Basel
17:30	Nadig 19' (1:1); Strack (yellow card) 38'	FCB summary	13' (0:1) Jacobacci; (red card) 32' Jacobacci; 55' (1:2) Ben Haki; 97' (1:3) Mottiez; 90' (1:4) Mottiez	Attendance: 6,000; Referee: (Switzerland) Marco Raveglia (San Vittore)
Note: 100th NLA game for FCB goalkeeper Urs Suter. Corners: 6:6.

9 May 1987 Matchday 25	Zürich	2–2	Xamax	Letzigrund, Zürich
20:00	Pellegrini 6' (1:0); Pellegrini 80' (2:2)	FCZ summary	9' (1:1) Ben Haki; 71' (1:2) Lei-Ravello; (yellow card) Mottiez	Attendance: 8,500; Referee: (Switzerland) Bruno Galler (Kirchdorf, Bern and Untersiggenthal)

16 May 1987 Matchday 26	Xamax	5–0	La Chaux-de-Fonds	Stade de la Maladière, Neuchâtel
	Lei-Ravello 28' (pen.); Stielike 32', 90'; Sutter 61'; Lüthi 83'

23 May 1987 Matchday 27	Young Boys	2–3	Xamax	Wankdorf Stadium, Bern
	Weber 33' (pen.), 55'		Lei-Ravello 37' (pen.); Ben Haki 53', 80'

30 May 1987 Matchday 28	Xamax	2–0	Bellinzona	Stade de la Maladière, Neuchâtel
	Jacobacci 22', 48'

3 June 1987 Matchday 29	Lausanne-Sport	1–1	Xamax	Stade Olympique de la Pontaise, Lausanne
	Thychosen 41'		Hermann 31'

12 June 1987 Matchday 30	Xamax	2–1	Aarau	Stade de la Maladière, Neuchâtel
20:00	Jacobacci 11'; Lei-Ravello 30' (pen.)	FCA summary	Wyss 29'	Attendance: 20,300; Referee: (Switzerland) Serge Muhmenthaler (Grenchen)

==== Final league table ====
Pos	Team	Pld	W	D	L	GF	GA	GD	Pts	Qualification
1	Xamax	30	21	6	3	75	27	+48	48	Swiss champions qualified for 1987–88 European Cup
2	Grasshopper Club	30	19	5	6	60	36	+24	43	qualified for 1987–88 UEFA Cup and entered 1987 Intertoto Cup
3	Sion	30	17	8	5	76	38	+38	42	qualified for 1987–88 UEFA Cup
4	Servette	30	16	4	10	65	44	+21	36	
5	Luzern	30	12	12	6	55	38	+17	36	
6	Zürich	30	12	12	6	52	44	+8	36	
7	St. Gallen	30	14	6	10	50	43	+7	34	
8	Lausanne-Sport	30	13	6	11	64	60	+4	32	entered 1987 Intertoto Cup
9	Bellinzona	30	10	11	9	42	39	+3	31	entered 1987 Intertoto Cup
10	Young Boys	30	10	8	12	47	45	+2	28	Swiss Cup winners qualified for 1987–88 Cup Winners' Cup
11	Aarau	30	9	8	13	37	42	−5	26	Play-out winners, remained in 1987–88 Nationalliga A
12	Basel	30	9	6	15	49	62	−13	24	Play-out winners, remained in 1987–88 Nationalliga A
13	Vevey Sports	30	6	8	16	31	72	−41	20	Play-out losers, relegated to 1987–88 Nationalliga B
14	Wettingen	30	6	7	17	31	48	−17	19	Play-out losers, relegated to 1987–88 Nationalliga B
15	Locarno	30	6	7	17	44	65	−21	19	Relegated to 1987–88 Nationalliga B
16	La Chaux-de-Fonds	30	1	4	25	22	97	−75	6	Relegated to 1987–88 Nationalliga B and entered 1987 Intertoto Cup

Source: rsssf.com
Rules for classification: 1) Points; 2) Goal difference; 3) Goals scored; 4) Head-to-head points; 5) Away goals scored; 6) Draw.

=== Swiss Cup ===
20 September 1986 Third round	FC Breitenbach	2–8	Xamax	Sportanlage Grien, Breitenbach
	Dalhäuser 53'; Hänggi 70'		Urban 14', 87'; Jacobacci 24', 59'; Zaugg 26', 78'; Lei-Ravello 67', 68'

18 October 1986 Round of 32	Monthey	0–3	Xamax	Stade Philippe Pottier, Monthey
			Lei-Ravello 42' (pen.); Jacobacci 46'; Lüthi 72'

11 November 1986 Round of 16	Sion	3–0	Xamax	Stade de Tourbillon, Sion
	Bregy 13'; Bouderbala 47'; Ryf 68' (o.g.)

=== UEFA Cup ===
16 September 1986 First round	Xamax (Switzerland)	2–0	(Denmark) Lyngby	Stade de la Maladière, Neuchâtel
20:00	Jacobacci 29'; Stielike 82'	Report		Attendance: 8,200; Referee: José Guedes (Portugal)

1 October 1986 First round	Lyngby (Denmark)	1–3	(Switzerland) Xamax	Lyngby Stadium, Kongens Lyngby
19:00	Jørgensen 72'	Report	Jacobacci 2'; Lüthi 38', 44'	Attendance: 4,062; Referee: Klaus Peschel (East Germany)

22 October 1986 Second round	Groningen (Netherlands)	0–0	(Switzerland) Xamax	Stadion Oosterpark, Groningen
20:00		Report		Attendance: 15,302; Referee: Thorbjørn Aas (Norway)

5 November 1986 Second round	Xamax (Switzerland)	1–1	(Netherlands) Groningen	Stade de la Maladière, Neuchâtel
20:00	Sutter 39'	Report	van Dijk 44'	Attendance: 11,600; Referee: Lajos Németh (Hungary)
