= 1985–86 FC Basel season =

FC Basel
1985–86 season
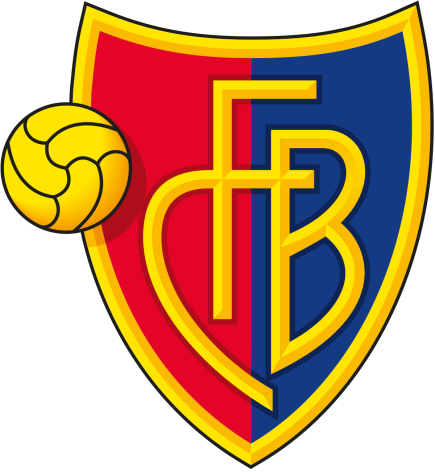
- Chairman: Urs Gribi
- Manager: Helmut Benthaus
- Ground: St. Jakob Stadium, Basel
- Nationalliga A: 10th of 16
- Swiss Cup: Semifinal
- Top goalscorer: League: Erni Maissen (14); All: Erni Maissen (19)
- Highest home attendance: 12,800 on 7 August 1985 vs. Luzern
- Lowest home attendance: 853 on 19 April 1986 vs. Baden
- Average home league attendance: 4,923

The Fussball Club Basel 1893 1985–86 season was their 92nd season since their foundation on 15 November 1893. It was the club's 40th consecutive season in the top flight of Swiss football since their promotion in the 1945–46 season. FC Basel played their home games in the St. Jakob Stadium. Urs Gribi was the club's chairman for the third consecutive year.

== Overview ==
=== Pre-season ===
Helmut Benthaus returned to FCB as first team manager, following his successful three-year term with VfB Stuttgart, in which they won the Bundesliga in the 1983–84 season. He took over from caretaker manager Emil Müller. A number of players left the squad. Former Netherlands international Adrie van Kraay retired from active football. Swiss international player Martin Andermatt moved on to Grasshopper Club and Livio Bordoli moved on to Locarno. Two players, Beat Feigenwinter and Nicolas Keller, left the first team squad and went to play for the reserve team. In the other direction Gerd Strack signed in from 1. FC Köln, André Ladner and Marco Schällibaum both signed in from Grasshopper Club, Francois Laydu signed in from La Chaux-de-Fonds and local lad Enrique Mata joined after a three-season period by Xamax. Further, another local lad Stefano Ceccaroni returned from his one-season loan to Baden.

In this season Basel played a total of 51 games. 30 matches were played in the domestic league, five in the Swiss Cup and 16 were friendly matches. Of their 16 test games, 12 ended with a victory, one was drawn, three ended with a defeat, the team scored 78 goals and conceded 18. Only one of these test games were played at home in St. Jakob Stadium, against Bayern Munich, all the others were played away from home.

=== Domestic league ===
Basel played in the 1985–86 Nationalliga A, which was contested by 16 teams, these being the top 14 clubs from the previous 1984–85 season and the two promoted teams from the second level Nationalliga B the previous season, these being Grenchen and Baden. The swiss league championship was contested in a double round robin format, with each club playing every other club twice, once at home and once away. Two points were awarded for a win and one point given to each team for a draw. The champions would be qualified for 1986–87 European Cup and the next two teams in the league would be qualified for the 1986–87 UEFA Cup.

Basel ended the season in tenth position, 14 points behind BSC Young Boys who became that season's champions and qualified for the 1986–87 European Cup. In their 30 league championship matches Basel won ten games, drew ten and also lost ten, which meant that they obtained 30 points. They scored 44 and conceding 40 goals. Erni Maissen was the team's top league goal scorer with 14 goals, Enrique Mata scored seven, Thomas Hauser scored five. Xamax and Luzern qualified for the 1986–87 UEFA Cup. The two newly promoted teams Grenchen and Baden both suffered relegation.

=== Swiss Cup ===
Basel entered the Swiss Cup in the round of 64 with an away game against lower classed Concordia Basel. The game was played in the St. Jakob Stadium, in which Concordia had home team status, in front of 1,800 spectators and Basel won 9–1. They continued to the round of 32 in which they had a home game against FC Vernier, which was won 6–0. In the round of 16 they had a home game against Lausanne Sports, which ended in a 4–1 victory. The quarterfinal was played as visitors to lower classed FC Lengnau and with a 6–0 victory, Basel advanced to the semifinal. The semi final was played at home in front of 12,000 spectators against Servette on 15 April 1986 and Servette took an early three-goal lead. A hat trick form Gerd Strack in the last 22 minutes of regular time meant that the match had to go into overtime. But with a penalty goal against them in the 4 minute of the extra time meant that Basel did not reach the final. Sion beat Servette in the final and as Cup winners were qualified for the 1986–87 Cup Winners' Cup.

== Players ==
Note: Flags indicate national team as defined under FIFA eligibility rules; some limited exceptions apply. Players may hold more than one non-FIFA nationality.

No.	Pos.	Nation	Player
1	GK	SUI	Dominik Leder
1	GK	SUI	Thomas Paul
1	GK	SUI	Urs Suter
2	DF	SUI	André Ladner (from Grasshopper Club)
3	DF	SUI	Ertan Irizik
4	DF	GER	Thomas Süss
5	DF	GER	Gerd Strack (from 1. FC Köln)
6	DF	SUI	Marco Schällibaum (from Grasshopper Club)
7	MF	SUI	Martin Jeitziner
8	FW	SUI	Beat Sutter
9	MF	GER	Thomas Hauser
10	MF	SUI	Erni Maissen

No.	Pos.	Nation	Player
11	FW	SUI	Ruedi Zbinden
12	DF	SUI	Francois Laydu (from La Chaux-de-Fonds)
13	DF	SUI	Alfred Lüthi
14	MF	ESP	Enrique Mata (from Xamax)
15	MF	SUI	Peter Nadig
16	DF	SUI	Fredy Grossenbacher
17	MF	SUI	René Botteron
18	DF	SUI	Stefano Ceccaroni (return after loan at Baden)
19	DF	SUI	Dominique Herr
—	NF	SUI	Heinz Reichen (from FC Oensingen)
—	FW	SUI	Adrian Knup
—	MF	SUI	Felix Rudin

Players who left the squad

Note: Flags indicate national team as defined under FIFA eligibility rules; some limited exceptions apply. Players may hold more than one non-FIFA nationality.

No.	Pos.	Nation	Player
—	DF	SUI	Beat Feigenwinter (reserves)
—	DF	NED	Adrie van Kraay (retired)

No.	Pos.	Nation	Player
—	DF	SUI	Martin Andermatt (to Grasshopper Club)
—	DF	SUI	Livio Bordoli (to Locarno)
—	MF	SUI	Nicolas Keller (reserves)

== Results ==
Legend

Win Draw Loss Postponed

=== Friendly matches ===
==== Pre- and mid-season ====
13 July 1985 Pre-season	Wasseramt (Water Works) XI (Switzerland)	1–7	(Switzerland) Basel	Galmis, Rüttenen
17:00	Rickli 70' (1:7)	FCB summary	11' (0:1) Ceccaroni; 17' (0:2) Mata; 24' (0:3) Mata; 36' (0:4) Sutter; 58' (0:5) Schällibaum; 59' (0:6) Maissen; 66' (0:7) Lüthi	Referee: (Switzerland) Francis Fischer (Arch)

16 July 1985 Nissan Cup semi-final	Basel (Switzerland)	5–2	(Switzerland) Grenchen	Wyler, Bern
19:00	Sutter 27' (1:0); Maissen 56' (2:0); Botteron 57' (3:0); Sutter 72' (4:1); Sutter 75' (5:1)	FCB summary	64' (3:1) Michelberger; 90' (5:2) Michelberger	Attendance: 600; Referee: (Switzerland) Willy Hänni, (Cugy)

17 July 1985 Uhrencup semi-final	Basel (Switzerland)	3–1	(Switzerland) Biel-Bienne	Stadion Brühl, Grenchen
19:00	Grossenbacher 49' (1:0); Schällibaum 51' (2:0); Ceccaroni 70' (3:0)	FCB summary	82' (3:1) Rappo	Attendance: 1,800; Referee: (Switzerland) Francis Fischer (Arch)
Note: The Uhrencup is a former club football tournament that was held annually in Grenchen in Switzerland.

20 July 1985 Uhrencup final	Grenchen (Switzerland)	4–1	(Switzerland) Basel	Stadion Brühl, Grenchen
19:30	Stohler 17' (1:0); Zaugg 56' (2:0); Jäggi 58' (3:0); Lehnherr 83' (4:1)	FCB summary	79' (3:1) Strack	Attendance: 4,500; Referee: (Switzerland) Alfred Heinis (Ammannsegg, Biberist)
Note: The Uhrencup is a former club football tournament that was held annually in Grenchen in Switzerland.

25 July 1985 Nissan Cup final	Young Boys (Switzerland)	0–1	(Switzerland) Basel	Wankdorf Stadium, Bern
19:00	Lunde (red card) 66'	FCB summary	63' (0:1) Maissen; (yellow card) 67' Botteron	Attendance: 1,800; Referee: (Switzerland) Wenger

30 July 1985 Pre-season	Basel (Switzerland)	0–1	(Germany) Bayern Munich	St. Jakob Stadium, Basel
19:30		FCB summary	Lerby	Attendance: 7,500; Referee: (Switzerland) Manfred Schlup, (Grenchen)
Note: There was a minute's silence before the match in memory of FCB honorary member Alfred Schaller.

10 September 1985 Mid-season	Old Boys (Switzerland)	2–7	(Switzerland) Basel	Stadion Schützenmatte, Basel
19:30	Trojani 51' (1:4); Gilica 66' (2:5)	FCB summary	7' (0:1) Ceccaroni; 35' (0:2) Ceccaroni; 46' (0:3) Hauser; 50' (0:4) Enrique Mata; 62' (1:5) Ceccaroni; 68' (2:6) Hauser; 69' (2:7) Hauser	Attendance: 240; Referee: (Switzerland) Peter Bochsler (Basel)

==== Winter break ====
7 December 1985 Winter break	SC Schw. Bankgesellschaft BS (Switzerland)	0–13	(Switzerland) Basel	Basel
15:00		FCB summary	(3x) Nadig (3x) Jeitziner (2x) Hauser (2x) Schällibaum (1x) Zbinden (1x) Lüthi (1x) Botteron	Referee: (Switzerland) Walter Rudin (Birsfelden)

28 January 1986 Winter break	Bahamas selection (The Bahamas)	0–14	(Switzerland) Basel	Freeport, The Bahamas
15:00		FCB summary	(4x) Hauser (2x) Botteron (2x) Sutter (2x) Ceccaroni (1x) Süss (1x) Mata (1x) Lüthi (1x) Ladner

31 January 1986 Winter break	Bahamas selection (The Bahamas)	0–10	(Switzerland) Basel	Freeport, The Bahamas
16:00		FCB summary	(2x) Sutter (2x) Strack (2x) Maissen (1x) Ceccaroni (1x) Jeitziner (1x) Lüthi (1x) Botteron

13 February 1986 Winter break	Old Boys (Switzerland)	0–4	(Switzerland) Basel	Stadion Schützenmatte, Basel
19:30		FCB summary	6' (0:1) Maissen; 51' (0:2) Maissen; 60' (pen. 0:3) Botteron; 75' (0:4) Lüthi	Attendance: 30; Referee: (Switzerland) Rolf Blattmann (Zeiningen)

16 February 1986 Winter break	Baden (Switzerland)	1–2	(Switzerland) Basel	Dornau, Dietikon
14:30	Benz 85' (1:1)	FCB summary	3' (0:1) Jeitziner; 90' (1:2) Lüthi	Attendance: 200; Referee: (Switzerland) Bernard Neukom (Zürich)

22 February 1986 Winter break	Locarno (Switzerland)	4–3	(Switzerland) Basel	Stadio del Lido, Locarno
14:30	Mata 41' (o.g. 1:2); Schönwetter 49' (2:2); Kurz 61' (3:2); Abächerli 72' (4:2)	FCB summary	28' (0:1) Nadig; 39' (0:2) Maissen; 80' (4:3) Grossenbacher	Attendance: 1,000; Referee: (Switzerland) Silvio Papa

1 March 1986 Winter break	Locarno (Switzerland)	2–3	(Switzerland) Basel	Stadio del Lido, Locarno
15:00	Tami 19' (1:2); Tami 36' (2:2)	FCB summary	12' (0:1) Sutter; 15' (o.g. 0:2) Rossi; 57' (2:3) Mata	Attendance: 300; Referee: (Switzerland) Sandro Gozzi

2 March 1986 Winter break	Losone Sportiva (Switzerland)	0–5	(Switzerland) Basel	Losone
14:30		FCB summary	10' (0:1) Lüthi; 20' (0:2) Ladner; 33' (0:3) Botteron; 51' (0:4) Sutter; 55' (0:5) Sutter

4 March 1986 Winter break	Freiburger FC (Germany)	0–0	(Switzerland) Basel	Möslestadion, Freiburg im Breisgau
16:00		FCB summary

=== Nationalliga A ===
==== League matches ====
7 August 1985 Round 1	Basel	0–1	Luzern	St. Jakob Stadium, Basel
20:00	Strack (yellow card) 9'	FCB summary	Burri (yellow card) 26'; Baumann (yellow card) 66'; Bernaschina (red card) 74'; M. Müller 81' (0:1)	Attendance: 12,800; Referee: (Switzerland) Freddy Philippoz (Sion)

10 August 1985 Round 2	Vevey-Sports	2–2	Basel	Stade de Copet, Vevey
20:00	Abega 35' (1:1); Cacciapaglia (yellow card) 56'; Gavillet 73' (2:2)	FCB summary	6' (0:1) Mata; (yellow card) 34' Maissen; (yellow card) 49' Irizik; (yellow card) 53' Jeitziner; 53' (1:2) Botteron; (yellow card) 65' Süss	Attendance: 2,900; Referee: (Switzerland) Manfred Schlup, (Grenchen)

17 August 1985 Round 3	Basel	0–3	Wettingen	St. Jakob Stadium, Basel
20:00	Irizik (yellow card) 10'; Sutter (yellow card) 38'	FCB summary	(yellow card) 8' Graf; 12' (0:1) Peterhans; 74' (pen. 0:2) Dupovac; 76' (0:3) Roth	Attendance: 5,200; Referee: (Switzerland) Charles-Henri Morex (Bex)

20 August 1985 Round 4	Lausanne-Sport	2–2	Basel	Olympique de la Pontaise, Lausanne
20:15	Thychosen 58' (1:1); Duc 64' (2:2); Duc (yellow card) 68'; Hertig (yellow card) 90'	FCB summary	24' (0:1) Grossenbacher; (yellow card) 39' Botteron; (yellow card) 41' Mata; 62' (1:2) Hauser	Attendance: 5,000; Referee: (Switzerland) Gottfried Friedrich (Seedorf, Uri)

24 August 1985 Round 5	Zürich	1–0	Basel	Letzigrund, Zürich
20:00	Bickel 90' (1:0)	FCZ summary FCB summary	(yellow card) 27' Botteron; (yellow card) 34' Hauser; (yellow card) 81' Süss; (yellow card) 90' Suter; (yellow card) 90+1' Schällibaum	Attendance: 6,200; Referee: (Switzerland) Walter Nussbaumer (Crans-près-Céligny)
Note: National coach Paul Wolfisberg commented on the match to the Tages-Anzeiger with the following words: “I almost fell asleep.”

31 August 1985 Round 6	Basel	1–0	Sion	St. Jakob Stadium, Basel
20:00	Hauser 1' (1:0); Maissen (yellow card) 26'	FCB summary	(yellow card) 24' Bouderbala	Attendance: 4,300; Referee: (Switzerland) Claude Gachoud

4 September 1985 Round 7	St. Gallen	1–1	Basel	Espenmoos, St. Gallen
20:00	Jurkemik (yellow card) 19'; Jurkemik 47' (1:0)	FCB summary	85' (1:1) Strack	Attendance: 7,000; Referee: (Switzerland) Philippe Mercier (Pully)

14 September 1985 Round 8	Basel	4–1	Aarau	St. Jakob Stadium, Basel
20:00	Hauser 23' (1:0); Irizik (yellow card) 26'; Grossenbacher 45' (2:0); Maissen 50' (3:0); Maissen 56' (4:0); Hauser (yellow card) 57'; Süss (yellow card) 71'	FCB summary FCA summary	(yellow card) 51' Zahner; 65' (4:1) Roberto Fregno; (yellow card) 73' Iselin; (yellow card) (yellow-red card) 88' Zahner	Attendance: 10,000; Referee: (Switzerland) Renzo Peduzzi (Roveredo)

29 September 1985 Round 9	Baden	1–3	Basel	Scharten, Baden
15:00	Benz (yellow card) 77'; Humbel 80' (1:3)	FCB summary	12' (0:1) Mata; 50' (0:2) Schällibaum; (yellow card) 73' Süss; 78' (0:3) Botteron	Attendance: 2,800; Referee: (Switzerland) Walter Nussbaumer (Crans-près-Céligny)

16 October 1985 Round 10	Basel	2–0	La Chaux-de-Fonds	St. Jakob Stadium, Basel
20:00	Hauser 39' (1:0); Strack (yellow card) 69'; Maissen 73' (2:0)	FCB summary		Attendance: 2,700; Referee: (Switzerland) André Daina (Éclépens)

19 October 1985 Round 11	Xamax	4–0	Basel	Stade de la Maladière (1924), Neuchâtel
18:15	Elsener 8' (1:0); Elsener 48' (pen. 2:0); Mottiez 52' (3:0); Mottiez 73' (4:0)	FCB summary		Attendance: 10,900; Referee: (Switzerland) Willi Jaus (Feldmeilen)

26 October 1985 Round 12	Basel	2–0	Servette	St. Jakob Stadium, Basel
20:00	Maissen 43' (1:0); Hauser 52' (2:0)	FCB summary		Attendance: 7,000; Referee: (Switzerland) Bruno Galler (Kirchdorf, Bern)
Note: Fair game, no yellow cards.

2 November 1985 Round 13	Grenchen	1–0	Basel	Stadion Brühl, Grenchen
18:00	Eggeling 18' (1:0)	FCB summary	(yellow card) 73' Irizik	Attendance: 2,500; Referee: (Switzerland) Claude Gachoud

16 November 1985 Round 14	Basel	2–2	Grasshopper Club	St. Jakob Stadium, Basel
17:30	In-Albon 47' (o.g. 1:1); Mata 55' (2:1)	FCB summary	8' (0:1) Matthey; (yellow card) 38' Matthey; (yellow card) 53' In-Albon; 57' (2:2) Koller	Attendance: 7,800; Referee: (Switzerland) Georges Sandoz (Corcelles-Cormondrèche, Neuchâtel)

24 November 1985 Round 15	Young Boys	1–1	Basel	Weiherhus, Eschenbach
14:30	Lunde 13' (1:0); Zuffi (yellow card) 39'; Conz (yellow card) 44'; Sutter (yellow card) 85'	FCB summary	(yellow card) 20' Grossenbacher; (yellow card) 25' Schällibaum; 44' (1:1) Botteron	Attendance: 3,800; Referee: (Switzerland) Arturo Martino (Neukirch an der Thur)

2 March 1986 Round 16	Basel	P – P	Young Boys	St. Jakob Stadium, Basel
		[ Summary]
Note: Postponed and rescheduled due to weather conditions

9 March 1986 Round 17	Grasshopper Club	0–0	Basel	Hardturm, Zürich
14:30		FCB summary		Attendance: 5,500; Referee: (Switzerland) Philippe Mercier (Pully)
Note: Fair game, no yellow cards.

15 March 1986 Round 18	Basel	3–0	Grenchen	St. Jakob Stadium, Basel
17:30	Maissen 38' (1:0); Schällibaum 41' (2:0); Maissen 43' (3:0); Grossenbacher (yellow card)	FCB summary		Attendance: 3,000; Referee: (Switzerland) Freddy Philippoz (Sion)
Note: The pitch was in a terrible state. Swiss national team head-coach Daniel Jeandupeux was amongst the spectators. World Cup referee André Daina acted as a linesman for training purposes in preparation for the World Cup.

22 March 1986 Round 19	Servette1	1–2	Basel	Charmilles Stadium, Geneva
18:00	Jaccard 45' (1:1)	FCB summary	41' (0:1) Maissen; (yellow card) 69' Mata; 71' (1:2) Ladner	Attendance: 4,500; Referee: (Switzerland) Kurt Röthlisberger (Suhr, Aargau)

26 March 1986 Round 16	Basel	0–1	Young Boys	St. Jakob Stadium, Basel
20:00	Grossenbacher (yellow card) 72'	FCB summary	(yellow card) 42' Wittwer; 90' (0:1) Zuffi	Attendance: 7,500; Referee: (Switzerland) Claude Gachoud
Note: It was announced before the match that Fredy Grossenbacher had signed a two-year prolongation of his contract with FCB.

5 April 1986 Round 20	Basel	1–1	Xamax	St. Jakob Stadium, Basel
17:30	Jeitziner 5' (1:0); Irizik (yellow card) 51'	FCB summary	(yellow card) 41' Perret; 56' (1:1) Luthi	Attendance: 5,800; Referee: (Switzerland) Francesco Bianchi (Chiasso)

12 April 1986 Round 21	La Chaux-de-Fonds	0–0	Basel	Stade Charrière, La Chaux-de-Fonds
18:00		FCB summary	(yellow card) 72' Süss	Attendance: 1,000; Referee: (Switzerland) Arturo Martino (Neukirch an der Thur)

19 April 1986 Round 22	Basel	5–0	Baden	St. Jakob Stadium, Basel
17:30	Maissen 26' (1:0); Mata 53' (2:0); Jeitziner 62' (3:0); Grossenbacher 77' (4:0); Nadig 81' (5:0)	FCB summary		Attendance: 853; Referee: (Switzerland) Renzo Peduzzi (Roveredo)
Note: NLA debut for 18-year-old Adrian Knup.

26 April 1986 Round 23	Aarau	2–1	Basel	Stadion Brügglifeld, Aarau
20:00	Herberth 36' (pen. 1:1); Küng (yellow card) 38'; Fregno 70' (2:1); Fregno (yellow card) 85'	FCB summary FCA summary	10' (0:1) Maissen; (yellow card) 38' Ladner; (yellow card) 49' Schällibaum	Attendance: 5,000; Referee: (Switzerland) André Daina (Éclépens)

29 April 1986 Round 24	Basel	3–1	St. Gallen	St. Jakob Stadium, Basel
20:00	Maissen 14' (1:0); Mata 38' (2:1); Maissen 89' (3:1)	FCB summary	24' (1:1) Urban; (yellow card) 66' Huwyler	Attendance: 1,500; Referee: (Switzerland) Manfred Schlup, (Grenchen)

3 May 1986 Round 25	Sion	1–0	Basel	Stade Tourbillon, Sion
20:15	Brigger (penalty missed) 8′ Cina 77' (1:0)	FCB summary		Attendance: 5,300; Referee: (Switzerland) Willi Jaus (Feldmeilen)
Note: 8th minute, Urs Suter saved the penalty from Jean-Paul Brigger.

10 May 1986 Round 26	Basel	3–3	Zürich	St. Jakob Stadium, Basel
17:30	Botteron (penalty missed) 11′ Maissen 13' (1:1); Nadig 19' (2:1); Nadig 78' (3:3); Mata (yellow card)	FCZ summary Summary	5' (0:1) Rufer; 40' (2:2) Alliata; 43' (2:3) Alliata; (yellow card) Kraus	Attendance: 2,600; Referee: (Switzerland) Freddy Philippoz, Sion
Note: 11th minute, René Botteron kicks the penalty wide of the goal.

13 May 1986 Round 27	Basel	0–3	Lausanne-Sport	St. Jakob Stadium, Basel
20:00	Botteron (penalty missed) 37′	FCB summary	55' (0:1) Hertig; 61' (0:2) Thychosen; 91' (0:3) Thychosen	Attendance: 1,500; Referee: (Switzerland) Bruno Galler (Kirchdorf, Bern)
Note: 37th minute, Lausanne goalkeeeper Jean-Claude Milani saved the penalty-kick from René Botteron.

16 May 1986 Round 28	Wettingen	1–1	Basel	Stadion Altenburg, Wettingen
20:00	Aebischer 58' (1:1)	FCB summary	14' (0:1) Maissen	Attendance: 1,200; Referee: (Switzerland) René Kellenberger (Herisau)

24 May 1986 Round 29	Basel	5–2	Vevey-Sports	St. Jakob Stadium, Basel
18:00	Maissen 29' (1:0); Strack 51' (2:0); Mata 65' (3:0); Mata 78' (4:0); Jeitziner 86' (5:2)	FCB summary	83' (4:1) Schürmann; 84' (4:2) Pavoni	Attendance: 1,200; Referee: (Switzerland) Arturo Martino (Neukirch an der Thur)

27 May 1986 Round 30	Luzern	4–0	Basel	Stadion Allmend, Luzern
20:00	M. Müller 44' (1:0); Halter 51' (2:0); Grétarsson 60' (3:0); Halter 72' (4:0)	FCB summary		Attendance: 11,700; Referee: (Switzerland) Werner Liebi (Thun)

==== Final league table ====
Pos	Team	Pld	W	D	L	GF	GA	GD	Pts	Qualification
1	Young Boys	30	18	8	4	72	28	+44	44	Swiss champions, qualified for 1986–87 European Cup and entered 1986 Intertoto Cup
2	Xamax	30	18	6	6	78	32	+46	42	Qualified for 1986–87 UEFA Cup
3	Luzern	30	16	9	5	56	39	+17	41	Qualified for 1986–87 UEFA Cup and entered 1986 Intertoto Cup
4	Zürich	30	15	9	6	64	43	+21	39	Entered 1986 Intertoto Cup
5	Grasshopper Club	30	15	8	7	64	32	+32	38	Entered 1986 Intertoto Cup
6	Lausanne-Sport	30	13	9	8	59	50	+9	35	Entered 1986 Intertoto Cup
7	Aarau	30	14	6	10	62	47	+15	34	
8	Sion	30	14	5	11	54	39	+15	33	Swiss Cup winners, qualified for 1986–87 Cup Winners' Cup
9	Servette	30	14	3	13	49	50	−1	31	
10	Basel	30	10	10	10	44	40	+4	30	
11	St. Gallen	30	12	6	12	48	46	+2	30	Entered 1986 Intertoto Cup
12	Wettingen	30	8	8	14	35	42	−7	24	
13	La Chaux-de-Fonds	30	3	12	15	24	61	−37	18	
14	Vevey-Sports	30	6	5	19	36	76	−40	17	
15	Grenchen	30	5	6	19	33	81	−48	16	Relegated to 1986–87 Nationalliga B
16	Baden	30	1	6	23	14	86	−72	8	Relegated to 1986–87 Nationalliga B

Source: rsssf.com
Rules for classification: 1) Points; 2) Goal difference; 3) Goals scored; 4) Head-to-head points; 5) Away goals scored; 6) Draw.

=== Swiss Cup ===
22 September 1985 Round of 64	Concordia Basel	1–9	Basel	St. Jakob Stadium, Basel
20:00	Francois 58' (pen. 1:4)	FCB summary	10' (0:1) Hauser; 35' (0:2) Hauser; 39' (0:3) Mata; 57' (0:4) Nadig; 75' (1:5) Hauser; 79' (1:6) Jeitziner; 83' (1:7) Schällibaum; 86' (1:8) Ladner; 90' (1:9) Hauser	Attendance: 1,800; Referee: (Switzerland) André Reck
Note: Concordia played the 1985/86 season in the 1. Liga (third-tier). Fair game, no yellow cards.

13 October 1985 Round of 32	Basel	6–0	FC Vernier	St. Jakob Stadium, Basel
18:00	Maissen 12' (1:0); Maissen 19' (2:0); Mata 38' (3:0); Nadig 64' (4:0); Jeitziner 78' (5:0); Mata 81' (6:0)	FCB summary		Attendance: 1,400; Referee: (Switzerland) Manfred Schlup, (Grenchen)
Note: Vernier played the 1985/86 season in the 1. Liga (third-tier). A minute's silence in memory of the deceased Alfred Heidig (FCB honorary member) and Ulrich Nyffenegger (international referee). Fair game, no yellow cards.

8 November 1985 Round of 16	Basel	4–1	Lausanne Sports	St. Jakob Stadium, Basel
20:00	Hauser (yellow card) 5'; Maissen 14' (1:0); Mata 40' (2:0); Maissen 68' (3:0); Nadig 75' (4:0)	FCB summary	(yellow card) 7' Kaltaverdis; (yellow card) 52' Henry; 85' (4:1) Seramondi	Attendance: 2,800; Referee: (Switzerland) Kurt Röthlisberger (Suhr, Aargau)

31 March 1986 Quarterfinal	FC Lengnau	0–6	Basel	Sportanlage Moos, Lengnau
15:00		FCB summary	26' (0:1) Sutter; 54' (0:2) Sutter; 56' (0:3) Hauser; 60' (0:4) Maissen; 80' (0:5) Sutter; 88' (0:6) Sutter	Attendance: 3,417; Referee: (Switzerland) Willy Hänni, (Cugy)
Note: Lengnau played the 1985/86 season in the 1. Liga (third-tier).

15 April 1986 Semifinal	Basel	3–4 (a.e.t.)	Servette	St. Jakob Stadium, Basel
20:00	Strack 68' (1:3); Strack 79' (2:3); Strack 90' (3:3); Ladner (yellow card) 107'	FCB summary Servette summary	3' (0:1) Opoku Nti; 18' (0:2) Jaccard; 39' (0:3) Jaccard; (yellow card) 44' Jaccard; (yellow card) 89' Besnard; 94' (pen.) Geiger	Attendance: 12,000; Referee: (Switzerland) Kurt Röthlisberger (Suhr, Aargau)

== See also ==
- History of FC Basel
- List of FC Basel players
- List of FC Basel seasons

== Sources ==
- Rotblau: Jahrbuch Saison 2015/2016. Publisher: FC Basel Marketing AG. ISBN 978-3-7245-2050-4
- Die ersten 125 Jahre. Publisher: Josef Zindel im Friedrich Reinhardt Verlag, Basel. ISBN 978-3-7245-2305-5
- The FCB squad 1985–86 at fcb-archiv.ch
- Switzerland 1985–86 at RSSSF
