= 1985–86 Swiss Cup =

Tournament details
- Country: Switzerland

Final positions
- Champions: Sion
- Runners-up: Servette

The 1985–86 Swiss Cup was the 61st season of Switzerland's annual football cup competition.

== Overview ==
The competition began on 9 and 10 August 1985 with the first games of Round 1 and ended on Whit Monday 19 May 1986 with the final held at the former Wankdorf Stadium in Bern. The teams from the Nationalliga B were granted byes for the first round. The teams from the Nationalliga A were granted byes for the first two rounds. The winners of the cup qualified themselves for the first round of the Cup Winners' Cup in the next season.

== Round 3 ==
The teams from the NLA joined the cup competition in the third round. The draw was respecting regionalities, when possible, and the lower classed team was granted home advantage.

=== Summary ===
Team 1	Score	Team 2
21 September 1986
FC Renens	0–2	La Chaux-de-Fonds
FC Saint-Blaise	1–0	Etoile Carouge
Chênois	4–0	FC Stade Payerne
ES Malley	3–4 (a.e.t.)	Sion
Biel-Bienne	0–1 (a.e.t.)	FC Aarberg
Meyrin	2–4	Vevey Sports
FC Stäfa	0–7	Luzern
FC Dübendorf	1–0	Baden
Chiasso	2–1	FC Suhr
Laufen	1–2	FC Lengnau
FC Klus-Balsthal	1–2 (a.e.t.)	Aarau
Concordia	1–9	Basel
Fribourg	0–1	FC Vernier GE
Martigny-Sports	8–3	FC Domdidier
Tuggen	1–6	Bellinzona
Rapid Ostermundigen	0–6	Winterthur
Lugano	3–0	Red Star
FC Turicum ZH	0–6	Locarno
22 September 1986
FC Effretikon	0–3	St. Gallen
FC Olten	0–2	Grasshopper Club
US Boncourt	1–4	Yverdon-Sport
FC Rüti ZH	2–3	FC Altstätten SG
FC Brüttisellen	0–5	Zürich
Monthey	1–11	Neuchâtel Xamax
AS Breganzona	1–0	Vaduz
FC Breitenbach	1–4	Grenchen
FC Langenthal	0–3	SC Zug
FC Zug	0–1	Young Boys
FC Lalden	0–1	Servette
Montreux-Sports	1–9	Lausanne-Sport
FC Bremgarten AG	1–2	Wettingen
FC Glarus	1–2	Kreuzlingen

=== Matches ===
21 September 1986
17:30

FC Klus-Balsthal	1–2 (a.e.t.)	Aarau
Erich Hert 11'	FCA summary	3' Alfred Herberth; 114' Alfred Herberth

Sportplatz Moos, Balsthal
Attendance: 2,700
Referee: (Switzerland) Andreas Schluchter (Schönenbuch)

21 September 1986
20:00

Concordia Basel	1 – 9	Basel
Francois 58' (pen.)	FCB summary	10' (0:1) Hauser; 35' (0:2) Hauser; 39' (0:3) Mata; 57' (0:4) Nadig; 75' (1:5) Hauser; 79' (1:6) Jeitziner; 83' (1:7) Schällibaum; 86' (1:8) Ladner; 90' (1:9) Hauser

St. Jakob Stadium, Basel
Attendance: 1,800
Referee: (Switzerland) André Reck

22 September 1986
15:00

FC Brüttisellen	0–5 (a.e.t.)	Zürich
	FCZ summary	1' Kundert; 22' Häusermann; 46' Alliata; 49' Schneider; 80' Häusermann

Lindenbuck, Brüttisellen
Attendance: 1,671
Referee: (Switzerland) Willi Jaus (Feldmeilen)

22 September 1986
15:30

FC Zug	0–1	Young Boys
	YB summary	6' Zuffi

Herti Allmend Stadion, Zug
Attendance: 1,400
Referee: (Switzerland) Marco Raveglia (San Vittore)

22 September 1986
16:00

FC Lalden	0–1	Servette
	Servette summary	Schnyder

Sportplatz Finnenbach, Lalden

== Round 4 ==
=== Summary ===
Team 1	Score	Team 2
12 October 1985
La Chaux-de-Fonds	8–0	FC Saint-Blaise
Chênois	2–3 (a.e.t.)	Young Boys
Sion	6–1	Yverdon-Sport
Wettingen	6–0	FC Altstätten (St. Gallen)
Luzern	4–1	FC Dübendorf
Chiasso	1–3	FC Lengnau
Aarau	6–0	AS Breganzona
Basel	6–0	FC Vernier GE
Lausanne-Sport	8–2	Martigny-Sports
St. Gallen	3–0	Bellinzona
Winterthur	7–2	Lugano
Neuchâtel Xamax	1–2	Locarno
13 October 1985
Kreuzlingen	2–3 (a.e.t.)	Grenchen
FC Aarberg	0–4	Vevey Sports
SC Zug	1–2	Servette
Grasshopper Club	5–3 (a.e.t.)	Zürich

=== Matches ===
12 October 1985
17:30

Chênois	2–3 (a.e.t.)	Young Boys
Tlokinski 16' (1:1); Tlokinski 67' (2:1)	YB summary	5' (0:1) Lunde; 77' (2:2) Bregy; 113' (2:3) Bützer

Stade des Trois-Chêne, Thônex
Attendance: 3,000
Referee: (Switzerland) Charles-Henri Morex

12 October 1985
17:30

Aarau	6–0	AS Breganzona
Fregno 14' (1:0); Alfred Herberth 19' (2:0); Zwahlen 36' (3:0); Meyer 46' (4:0); Meyer 60' (5:0); Alfred Herberth 64' (6:0)	FCA summary

Stadion Brügglifeld, Aarau
Attendance: 1,600
Referee: (Germany) Ferdinand Friedrich

12 October 1985
15:00

Basel	6 – 0	FC Vernier
Maissen 12' (1:0); Maissen 19' (2:0); Mata 38' (3:0); Nadig 64' (4:0); Jeitziner 78' (5:0); Mata 81' (6:0)	Summary

St. Jakob Stadium, Basel
Attendance: 1,400
Referee: (Switzerland) Manfred Schlup Grenchen

13 October 1985
16:00

SC Zug	1–2	Servette
Goal	Servette summary	Schnyder; Schnyder

Herti Allmend Stadion, Zug

13 October 1985
16:00

Grasshopper Club	5–3 (a.e.t.)	Zürich
Egli 4' (1:0); Matthey 68' (2:0); Andermatt 94' (3:2); Sulser (109[4:3]); Sutter 116' (5:3)	FCZ summary	75' (pen.) Kundert; 86' (2:2) Rufer; 105' (3:3) Bickel

Hardturm, Zürich
Attendance: 10,500
Referee: (Switzerland) Renzo Peduzzi (Roveredo)

== Round 5 ==
=== Summary ===
Team 1	Score	Team 2
8 November 1985
Basel	4–1	Lausanne-Sport
9 November 1985
Grasshopper Club	5–2	Young Boys
St. Gallen	0–0 (a.e.t.) (5–4 p)	Winterthur
Sion	4–2	Vevey Sports
10 November 1985
Wettingen	4–0	Luzern
FC Lengnau	2–0	Aarau
Locarno	1–3	Servette
La Chaux-de-Fonds	3–0	Grenchen

=== Matches ===
8 November 1985
20:00

Basel	4 – 1	Lausanne Sports
Hauser (yellow card) 5'; Maissen 14' (1:0); Mata 40' (2:0); Maissen 68' (3:0); Nadig 75' (4:0)	Summary	(yellow card) 7' Kaltaverdis; (yellow card) 52' Henry; 85' (4:1) Seramondi

St. Jakob Stadium, Basel
Attendance: 2,800
Referee: (Switzerland) Kurt Röthlisberger Suhr

9 November 1985
16:00

Grasshopper Club	5–2	Young Boys
Gren 15' (1:0); Gren 18' (2:0); Gren 39' (3:1); Ponte 49' (4:1); Gren 45' (5:2)	YB summary	32' (2:1) Lunde; 54' (4:2) Lunde

Hardturm, Zürich
Attendance: 10,500
Referee: (Switzerland) Renzo Peduzzi (Roveredo)

10 November 1985
14:30

FC Lengnau	2–0 (a.e.t.)	Aarau
Ghisoni 6' (1:0); Bollinger 65' (2:0)	FCA summary

Moos, Lengnau
Attendance: 1,250
Referee: (Switzerland) Arturo Martino (Neukirch an der Thur)

10 November 1985
15:00

Locarno	1–3	Servette
Goal	Servette summary	Magnusson; Schnyder; Kok

Stadio comunale Lido, Locarno

== Quarter-finals ==
=== Summary ===
Team 1	Score	Team 2
31 May 19
La Chaux-de-Fonds	2–1	Grasshopper Club
Sion	2–0	Wettingen
FC Lengnau	0–6	Basel
St. Gallen	0–0 (a.e.t.) (5–6 p)	Servette

=== Matches ===
31 March 1986
15:00

FC Lengnau	0 – 6	Basel
	Summary	26' (0:1) Sutter; 54' (0:2) Sutter; 56' (0:3) Hauser; 60' (0:4) Maissen; 80' (0:5) Sutter; 88' (0:6) Sutter

Sportanlage Moos, Lengnau
Attendance: 3,417
Referee: (Switzerland) Willy Hänni

31 March 1986
15:00

St. Gallen	0–0 (a.e.t.)	Servette
	Servette summary
Penalties
Penalty scored Penalty missed	5–6	Penalty scored

Espenmoos, St. Gallen

== Semi-finals ==
=== Summary ===
Team 1	Score	Team 2
15 April 1986
La Chaux-de-Fonds	0–2	Sion
Basel	3–4 (a.e.t.)	Servette

=== Matches ===
15 April 1986
20:00

Basel	3 – 4 (a.e.t.)	Servette
Strack 68' (1:3); Strack 79' (2:3); Strack 90' (3:3); Ladner (yellow card) 107'	FCB summary Servette summary	3' (0:1) Opoku Nti; 18' (0:2) Jaccard; 39' (0:3) Jaccard; (yellow card) 44' Jaccard; (yellow card) 89' Besnard; 94' (pen.) Geiger

St. Jakob Stadium, Basel
Attendance: 12,000
Referee: (Switzerland) Kurt Röthlisberger Suhr

== Final ==
The cup final was played on Whit Monday 1986. There was a symbolic kick-off through film actor Jean-Paul Belmondo.

19 May 1986
14:30

Sion	3–1 (a.e.t.)	Servette
Balet 42' (1:1); Balet 52' (2:1); Bonvin 82' (3:1)	Fussball-Schweiz summary	24' (0:1) Schnyder

Wankdorf Stadium, Bern
Attendance: 39,000
Referee: (Switzerland) Philippe Mercier (Pully)

After injury in the 85th minute Referee Mercier was replaced by Georg Sandoz. Sion won the cup and this was their fifth cup title to this date.

== Further in Swiss football ==
- 1985–86 Nationalliga A
- 1985–86 Swiss 1. Liga

== Sources ==
- Fussball-Schweiz
- 1985–86 at fcb-achiv.ch
- Switzerland 1985–86 at RSSSF

Preceded by 1984–85	Swiss Cup seasons	Succeeded by 1986–87
