= Adrian Knup =

Swiss footballer (born 1968)

Personal information
- Date of birth: 2 July 1968 (age 58)
- Place of birth: Liestal, Switzerland
- Height: 1.85 m (6 ft 1 in)
- Position: Striker

Senior career*
Years	Team	Apps	(Gls)
1986–1988	FC Basel	40	(11)
1988–1989	FC Aarau	33	(13)
1989–1992	FC Luzern	74	(20)
1992–1994	VfB Stuttgart	53	(20)
1994–1996	Karlsruher SC	39	(11)
1996	Galatasaray	5	(2)
1996–1998	FC Basel	29	(8)
Total		273	(85)

International career
1989–1996	Switzerland	49	(26)

Managerial career
- 2007–2008: Switzerland (team leader)
- 2009–2017: FC Basel (head of youth)
- 2012–2017: FC Basel (vice president)
- * Club domestic league appearances and goals

Adrian Knup (born 2 July 1968) is a Swiss former professional footballer who played as a striker in the 1980s and 1990s.

He was capped 49 times and scored 26 goals for the Switzerland national team between 1989 and 1996, including three games at the 1994 FIFA World Cup. From 2009 to 2017 he worked as the head coach of the youth sector at FC Basel. He was also the vice president of the club between 2012 and 2017.

== Club career ==
Knup played his youth football with local team Basel. He advanced to their first team for their 1985–86 season and signed his first professional contract under manager Helmut Benthaus. After playing in one test match, Knup played his domestic league debut for the club in the home game at the St. Jakob Stadium on 19 April 1986 as Basel won 5–0 against Baden. In his first season Knup had just seven league appearances.

During their 1986–87 season Knup advanced and became a regular in the starting team. Knup was a typical No. 9 and was famed for the power he could get behind his headers. He scored his first league goal for his club in the first game of the season on 9 August 1986. It was the last goal of the away match against, but it could not help the team, as Basel were defeated 1–3 against Sion. In the following match one week later

Knup played three seasons with the club and received a call up to the Switzerland national team. But with Basel, apart from one title in the Uhrencup in 1986, he had no big successes. In their 1987–88 season his teammates included goalie Urs Suter, the defenders Peter Bernauer and Massimo Ceccaroni, the Scott Gordon Duffield Smith and two other Switzerland national team players Peter Nadig and Dominique Herr. Despite this personally strongly occupied team Basel were relegated to the Nationalliga B after the 1987–88 Nationalliga A season. One match in this season receives a particular mention, the away game on 29 November 1987 and Knup netted a hat-trick between the 37th and 71st minute as Basel won 4–0 against Zürich.

Following the relegation he left the team and joined FC Aarau in 1988. He spent only one season at Aarau and signed for FC Luzern in 1989 where he was an immediate success. In 1990, he was voted Luzern's Player of the Year. He was then signed by Bundesliga side VfB Stuttgart in 1992 where he played until 1994 when he signed for Karlsruher SC. He reached the 1995–96 DFB-Pokal final with Karlsruhe but they were beaten 1–0 by 1. FC Kaiserslautern. He then had a short spell with Galatasaray S.K. in Turkey before returning to Switzerland.

During the winter break of their 1996–97 season Knup returned to his club of origin under manager Karl Engel. But Knup needed some six matches before he found the binding to his new teammates and then it came to being. He scored two goals at home against Grasshopper Club, another goal in the home match against Xamax and another two goals in the home match against Aarau.

Knup stayed with the club for another season before he retired from his active football career. Between the years 1982 to 1988 and again from 1996 to 1998 Knup played a total of 138 games for Basel scoring a total of 54 goals. exactly 100 of these games were in the Nationalliga A, eight in the Swiss Cup and 30 were friendly games. He scored 29 goals in the domestic league, four in the cup and the other 21 were scored during the test games.

== International career ==
Knup played for the Switzerland national team between 1989 and 1996. He scored 26 goals in 49 games. Two of his goals came against Romania in a 4–1 win at the 1994 FIFA World Cup in the USA.

== Personal life ==
After retirement from his playing career, Knup became a commentator for Swiss League matches. On 25 May 2007, he was given the job as a coach for the Switzerland national team but demissioned after UEFA Euro 2008.

At the FC Basel AGM in June 2009 Knup was elected into the club's board of directors under club president Gigi Oeri. From 2009 to 2012 he worked as the head coach for the club's the youth sector. At the AGM in 2012, Ms Oeri stood down and Bernard Heusler became the club chairman, Knup was elected as vice president of the club. He held this position until 2017. Knup, president Heusler, finance director Stephan Werthmüller, director of football Georg Heitz and marketing director René Kamm all stood downsold together and Heusler sold the clubs Holding AG to Benrhard Burgener.

== Career statistics ==
Scores and results list Switzerland's goal tally first, score column indicates score after each Knup goal.

List of international goals scored by Adrian Knup
No.	Date	Venue	Opponent	Score	Result	Competition
1	11 October 1989	St. Jakob Stadium, Basel, Switzerland	Belgium	1–0	2–2	1990 World Cup qualifier
2	13 December 1989	Estadio Heliodoro Rodríguez López, Santa Cruz de Tenerife, Spain	Spain	1–1	1–2	Friendly
3	2 June 1990	Espenmoos, St. Gallen, Switzerland	United States	2–1	2–1	Friendly
4	21 August 1990	Praterstadion, Vienna, Austria	Austria	3–1	3–1	Friendly
5	17 October 1990	Hampden Park, Glasgow, Scotland	Scotland	1–2	1–2	Euro 1992 qualifier
6	14 November 1990	Stadio Olimpico, Serravalle, San Marino	San Marino	3–0	4–0	Euro 1992 qualifier
7	2 February 1991	Miami Orange Bowl, Miami, United States	United States	1–0	1–0	Friendly
8	12 March 1991	Sportplatz Rheinau, Balzers, Switzerland	Liechtenstein	2–0	6–0	Friendly
9	12 March 1991	Sportplatz Rheinau, Balzers, Switzerland	Liechtenstein	3–0	6–0	Friendly
10	12 March 1991	Sportplatz Rheinau, Balzers, Switzerland	Liechtenstein	5–0	6–0	Friendly
11	1 May 1991	Vasil Levski National Stadium, Sofia, Bulgaria	Bulgaria	1–2	3–2	Euro 1992 qualifier
12	1 May 1991	Vasil Levski National Stadium, Sofia, Bulgaria	Bulgaria	2–2	3–2	Euro 1992 qualifier
13	5 June 1991	Espenmoos, St. Gallen, Switzerland	San Marino	1–0	7–0	Euro 1992 qualifier
14	5 June 1991	Espenmoos, St. Gallen, Switzerland	San Marino	6–0	7–0	Euro 1992 qualifier
15	16 August 1992	Kadrioru Stadium, Tallinn, Estonia	Estonia	3–0	6–0	1994 World Cup qualifier
16	16 August 1992	Kadrioru Stadium, Tallinn, Estonia	Estonia	4–0	6–0	1994 World Cup qualifier
17	9 September 1992	Wankdorfstadion, Bern, Switzerland	Scotland	1–0	3–1	1994 World Cup qualifier
18	9 September 1992	Wankdorfstadion, Bern, Switzerland	Scotland	2–1	3–1	1994 World Cup qualifier
19	17 March 1993	Stade El Menzah, Tunis, Tunisia	Tunisia	1–0	1–0	Friendly
20	11 August 1993	Ryavallen, Borås, Sweden	Sweden	1–1	2–1	Friendly
21	17 November 1993	Hardturm, Zürich, Switzerland	Estonia	1–0	4–0	1994 World Cup qualifier
22	22 June 1994	Pontiac Silverdome, Pontiac, United States	Romania	3–1	4–1	1994 World Cup
23	22 June 1994	Pontiac Silverdome, Pontiac, United States	Romania	4–1	4–1	1994 World Cup
24	23 June 1995	Wankdorfstadion, Bern, Switzerland	Germany	1–1	1–2	Friendly
25	16 August 1995	Laugardalsvollur, Reykjavík, Iceland	Iceland	1–0	2–0	Euro 1996 qualifier
26	15 November 1995	Wembley Stadium, London, England	England	1–0	1–3	Friendly

== Honours ==
VfB Stuttgart

- DFL-Supercup: 1992
