= Markus Füri =

Swiss footballer (born 1965)

Personal information
- Full name: Markus Füri
- Date of birth: 25 December 1965 (age 60)
- Place of birth: Switzerland
- Position: Defender

Senior career*
Years	Team	Apps	(Gls)
1984–1986	FC Concordia Basel		
1986–1989	FC Basel	32	(0)
- * Club domestic league appearances and goals

Markus Füri (born 25 December 1965) is a Swiss retired footballer who played in the 1980s as defender.

Füri played his youth football with FC Concordia Basel and advanced to their first team in the 1984–1985 season. He played two seasons for the team in the 1st League, the third tier of Swiss football, and during this time he was noted by the scouts of the top-tier clubs.

Füri joined FC Basel's first team for their 1986–87 season under head-coach Helmut Benthaus. After playing in four test games, Füri played his domestic league debut for his new club in the away game on 16 August 1986 as Basel played a 2–2 draw with Vevey-Sports.

At the end of the following 1987–88 Nationalliga A season, under manager Urs Siegenthaler, Füri and his team suffered relegation, but he stayed on with the club for another season. Between the years 1986 and 1989 Füri played a total of 48 games for Basel scoring a total of two goals. 32 of these games were in the Nationalliga A, two in the Swiss Cup and 14 were friendly games. He scored both goals during the test games.

== Sources ==
- Die ersten 125 Jahre. Publisher: Josef Zindel im Friedrich Reinhardt Verlag, Basel. ISBN 978-3-7245-2305-5
- Verein "Basler Fussballarchiv" Homepage
