= Claude Ryf =

Swiss footballer and manager (born 1957)

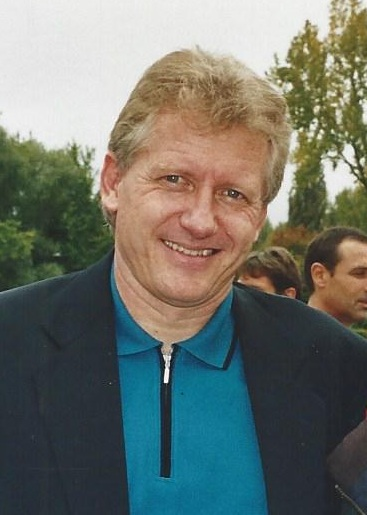

Personal information
- Date of birth: 18 March 1957 (age 69)
- Position: Defender

Senior career*
Years	Team	Apps	(Gls)
1976–1978	FS Renens		
1978–1985	FC Lausanne-Sport		
1985–1991	Neuchâtel Xamax		

International career
1986–1989	Switzerland	13	(0)

Managerial career
- 1992–1995: Étoile Carouge FC
- 1995–1996: Yverdon Sport FC
- 1996–1998: FC Baden
- 1998–1999: BSC Young Boys
- 1999–2001: FC Wil 1900
- 2002–2004: Neuchâtel Xamax
- 2006–2008: Switzerland u-20
- 2008–2009: Switzerland u-19
- 2011–2012: Switzerland u-18
- 2012–2013: Switzerland u-19
- 2013–2014: Switzerland u-20
- 2014–2017: Switzerland u-18
- 2018–: Switzerland u-20
- * Club domestic league appearances and goals

Claude Ryf (born 18 March 1957) is a retired Swiss football defender and later manager.

== Honours ==
Neuchâtel Xamax

- Swiss Super League: 1986–87, 1987–88
- Swiss Super Cup: 1987
