= Heinz Hermann =

Swiss footballer (born 1958)

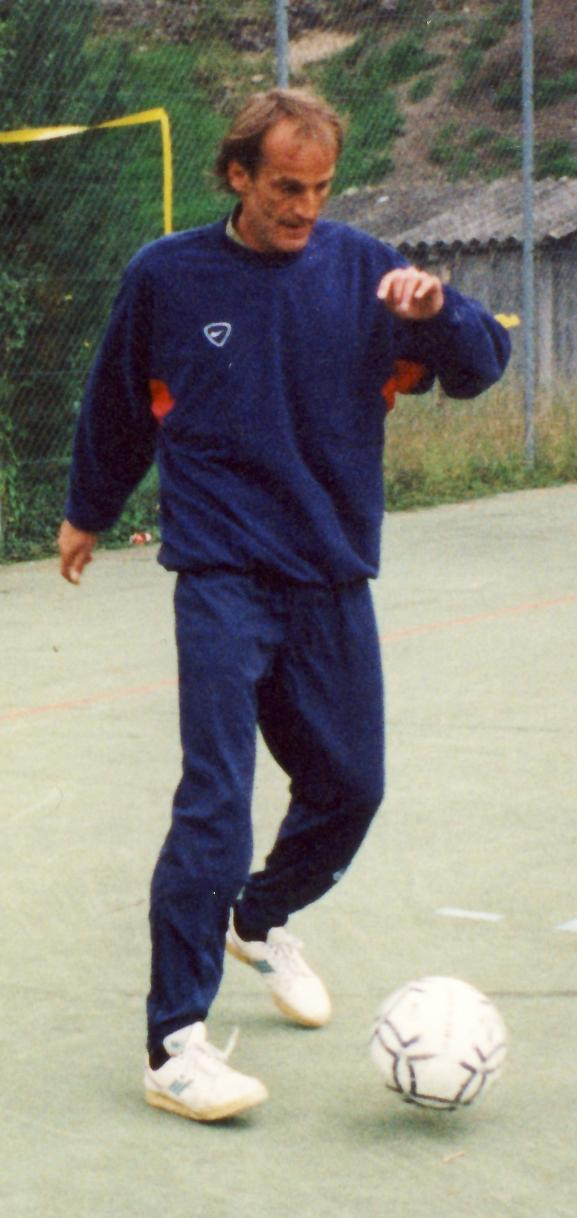
- Hermann in 2002

Personal information
- Date of birth: 28 March 1958 (age 68)
- Place of birth: Zürich, Switzerland
- Height: 1.82 m (6 ft 0 in)
- Position: Midfielder

Youth career
- FC Seefeld Zürich

Senior career*
Years	Team	Apps	(Gls)
1977–1985	Grasshoppers	213	(38)
1985–1990	Neuchâtel Xamax	139	(32)
1990–1992	Servette	90	(12)
1992–1993	Grasshoppers	18	(1)
1993–1994	Aarau	34	(1)
Total		494	(84)

International career
1978–1991	Switzerland	118	(15)

Managerial career
- 1997: FC Basel
- 2000–2002: SR Delémont
- 2002–2005: Waldhof Mannheim (Assistant)
- 2005–2007: FC Basel (Youth Coach)
- 2007–2008: FC Vaduz
- * Club domestic league appearances and goals

Heinz Hermann (born 28 March 1958) is a Swiss former professional footballer who played as a midfielder.

With 118 international caps (and 15 goals) between 1978 and 1991 for the Switzerland national team, Hermann is the nation's fourth-highest appearance maker, behind Granit Xhaka, Xherdan Shaqiri and Ricardo Rodriguez.

== Club ==
Hermann was born in Zürich. On 1 July 1977, he moved from FC Seefeld Zürich to Grasshopper Club Zürich, where he became Swiss league champion four times and cup champion once. At the end of the 1984–85 season, he changed to Neuchâtel Xamax. He later played for Servette FC and FC Aarau. From 1984 to 1988 he was awarded Player of the Year five consecutive seasons.

Hermann's first international match came in September 1978 with the 2–0 victory against the USA. In November 1991 he ended his international match career after a 1–0 loss to Romania.

His clubs as a coach include SR Delémont (manager), FC Vaduz in Liechtenstein, SV Waldhof Mannheim (assistant coach) and FC Basel, where he had filled a number of roles. In July 2012 he became new sports director of FC Luzern, but he was sacked on 6 February 2013.

== Honours ==
Grasshoppers

- Nationalliga A: 1977–78, 1981–82, 1982–83, 1983–84
- Swiss Cup: 1982–83

Neuchâtel Xamax

- Nationalliga A: 1986–87, 1987–88
- Swiss Super Cup: 1987

Individual

- Swiss Footballer of the Year: 1983–84, 1984–85, 1985–86, 1986–87, 1987–88

== See also ==
- List of men's footballers with 100 or more international caps
