= 1984 Danish 1st Division =

39th season of Danish 1st Division

Danish 1st Division
- Season: 1984

The 1984 Danish 1st Division season was the 39th season of the Danish 1st Division league championship, governed by the Danish Football Association. It constituted the 71st edition of the Danish football championship, and saw Vejle Boldklub win their fifth championship title.

The Danish champions qualified for the European Cup 1985-86 qualification, whilst the second placed team qualified for the qualification round of the UEFA Cup 1985-86. The three lowest placed teams of the tournament was directly relegated to the Danish 2nd Division for the following season. Likewise, the Danish 2nd Division champions and two first runners-up were promoted to the 1st Division.

== Table ==
Pos	Team	Pld	W	D	L	GF	GA	GD	Pts
1	Vejle Boldklub	30	17	7	6	60	36	+24	41
2	Aarhus GF	30	15	10	5	50	30	+20	40
3	Lyngby BK	30	18	2	10	55	34	+21	38
4	Brøndby IF	30	14	8	8	49	35	+14	36
5	Brønshøj BK	30	11	12	7	40	34	+6	34
6	Køge BK	30	12	6	12	39	36	+3	30
7	Ikast FS	30	13	3	14	44	45	−1	29
8	Herfølge BK	30	10	9	11	37	41	−4	29
9	Odense BK	30	10	8	12	47	40	+7	28
10	Næstved IF	30	9	9	12	46	51	−5	27
11	Hvidovre IF	30	7	13	10	28	37	−9	27
12	BK Frem	30	10	7	13	44	56	−12	27
13	Esbjerg fB	30	11	4	15	46	45	+1	26
14	Herning Fremad	30	9	8	13	30	50	−20	26
15	KB	30	10	5	15	36	46	−10	25
16	B 1909	30	6	5	19	20	55	−35	17

== Results ==
Home \ Away	AGF	B09	BIF	BBK	EfB	BKF	HBK	HFR	HIF	IFS	KB	KBK	LBK	NIF	OB	VBK
Aarhus GF	—	2–0	3–2	1–0	2–1	2–0	1–1	4–1	2–0	1–5	3–0	1–0	6–0	3–0	2–2	2–0
B 1909	1–1	—	0–2	0–2	0–3	3–2	0–1	2–0	0–0	1–0	3–1	0–1	0–4	1–1	1–1	0–2
Brøndby IF	1–1	6–1	—	0–2	3–2	1–0	2–2	4–1	2–0	2–0	1–4	0–0	1–2	3–1	2–2	0–0
Brønshøj BK	1–1	2–0	0–1	—	4–0	2–3	2–2	2–2	0–0	2–0	2–1	2–2	2–0	0–0	1–1	3–0
Esbjerg fB	1–1	2–1	0–1	4–1	—	1–2	1–2	2–0	0–0	2–5	4–1	3–1	0–2	2–0	0–3	0–1
BK Frem	1–0	3–1	2–4	3–2	0–3	—	0–0	1–1	2–2	4–1	1–1	3–0	3–3	2–1	2–3	1–2
Herfølge BK	1–1	1–0	0–2	1–1	5–2	1–1	—	1–1	0–3	1–0	1–3	1–0	2–1	2–3	2–3	0–1
Herning Fremad	1–2	2–0	1–0	1–2	0–0	2–0	0–3	—	2–2	0–2	1–0	0–3	1–0	2–2	2–1	1–0
Hvidovre IF	1–1	0–1	1–1	1–1	1–1	3–0	0–0	2–1	—	2–5	0–2	1–0	0–0	0–2	1–0	1–1
Ikast FS	0–0	2–0	4–0	0–2	1–0	1–1	2–0	0–3	0–3	—	3–0	3–2	0–2	1–0	2–0	1–4
Kjøbenhavns BK	2–1	2–0	1–1	0–1	1–0	0–1	2–0	1–1	0–2	2–1	—	0–2	2–3	1–2	2–1	1–3
Køge BK	4–1	3–0	1–1	0–0	0–4	1–0	0–2	0–1	1–0	4–1	1–0	—	1–2	3–1	2–1	2–0
Lyngby BK	1–2	1–2	0–2	5–0	3–2	1–0	5–2	4–0	2–0	3–0	1–2	1–0	—	3–1	2–0	1–2
Næstved IF	0–0	3–1	0–3	4–0	0–1	3–1	1–0	1–1	5–0	1–1	2–2	4–4	0–2	—	2–1	1–1
Odense BK	2–1	4–0	2–0	1–1	2–1	2–3	1–2	5–0	3–0	0–2	1–1	1–1	0–1	2–1	—	1–2
Vejle BK	1–2	1–1	2–1	0–0	2–4	9–2	2–1	4–1	2–2	3–1	3–1	2–0	1–0	8–4	1–1	—

Legend: Blue = home team win; Yellow = draw; Red = away team win.

== Top goalscorers ==
Position	Player	Club	Goals
1	Steen Thychosen	Vejle Boldklub	24
