= Luiz Gonçalo =

Brazilian footballer

Personal information
- Full name: Luiz Gonçalo
- Date of birth: 5 June 1960 (age 66)
- Position: Forward

Senior career*
Years	Team	Apps	(Gls)
1985–1986	FC Wettingen		
1986–1987	FC Basel	8	(1)
1987–1988	BSC Old Boys	11	(3)
- * Club domestic league appearances and goals

Luiz Gonçalo (born 5 June 1960) is a Brazilian retired footballer who played in the 1980s as a forward.

Gonçalo first played for FC Wettingen. He joined FC Basel's first team for their 1986–87 season under head-coach Helmut Benthaus. Gonçalo played his domestic league debut for his new club in the home game at the St. Jakob Stadium on 8 October 1986 as Basel were defeated 0–3 by Grasshopper Club. Gonçalo scored his first goal for his club on 18 October in the Swiss Cup in the home game against Fribourg. In fact he scored two goals, the last two goals in the game as Basel won 3–1. Gonçalo scored his first league goal for his club one week later on 25 October in the home game as Basel won 1–0 against Young Boys.

Although things started well for him, during the second half of the season Gonçalo didn't play another game. Gonçalo stayed only one season with the club, during this time he played a total of 14 games for Basel scoring a total of five goals. Eight of these games were in the Nationalliga A, two in the Swiss Cup and four were friendly games. He scored one goal in the domestic league, three goals in the Swiss Cup and the other was scored during the test games.

Following his time with Basel, Gonçalo moved on to play for Old Boys in the Nationalliga B, in the second tier of Swiss football.

== Sources ==
- Die ersten 125 Jahre. Publisher: Josef Zindel im Friedrich Reinhardt Verlag, Basel. ISBN 978-3-7245-2305-5
- Verein "Basler Fussballarchiv" Homepage
