= Paul Schönwetter =

German footballer

Personal information
- Date of birth: 15 November 1958 (age 67)
- Position: Midfielder

Senior career*
| Years | Team | Apps | (Gls) |
| 1983–1984 | 1860 Munich | | |
| 1985–1992 | FC Locarno | | |

Managerial career
- 1995–1999: FC Locarno
- 2000: FC Baden
- 2001: AC Bellinzona
- 2003–2005: FC Chiasso
- 2005: FC Lugano
- 2008–2009: FC Locarno
- 2014: FC Locarno
- * Club domestic league appearances and goals

Paul Schönwetter (born 15 November 1958) is a German former football player and manager who played as a midfielder.
