= Herbert Baumann (footballer) =

Swiss footballer (born 1964)

Personal information
- Date of birth: 16 September 1964 (age 62)
- Position: Defender

Senior career*
Years	Team	Apps	(Gls)
1981–1982	FC Emmenbrücke		
1982–1984	FC Littau		
1984–1998	FC Luzern		

International career
1989–1991	Switzerland	15	(0)
- * Club domestic league appearances and goals

Herbert Baumann (born 16 September 1964) is a retired Swiss football defender.
