= Robert Lüthi =

Swiss footballer (born 1958)

Personal information
- Full name: Robert Lüthi
- Date of birth: 12 July 1958 (age 68)
- Place of birth: Biel/Bienne, Switzerland
- Height: 1.70 m (5 ft 7 in)
- Position: Striker

Senior career*
Years	Team	Apps	(Gls)
1975–1980	FC Biel-Bienne		
1980–1992	Neuchâtel Xamax	291	(113)

International career
1981–1985	Switzerland	4	(1)
- * Club domestic league appearances and goals

Robert Lüthi (born 12 July 1958) is a retired Swiss footballer who played as a centre forward.

== Honours ==
Neuchâtel Xamax

- Swiss Super League: 1986–87, 1987–88
- Swiss Super Cup: 1987, 1988
