= Walter Hörmann =

Austrian footballer and coach

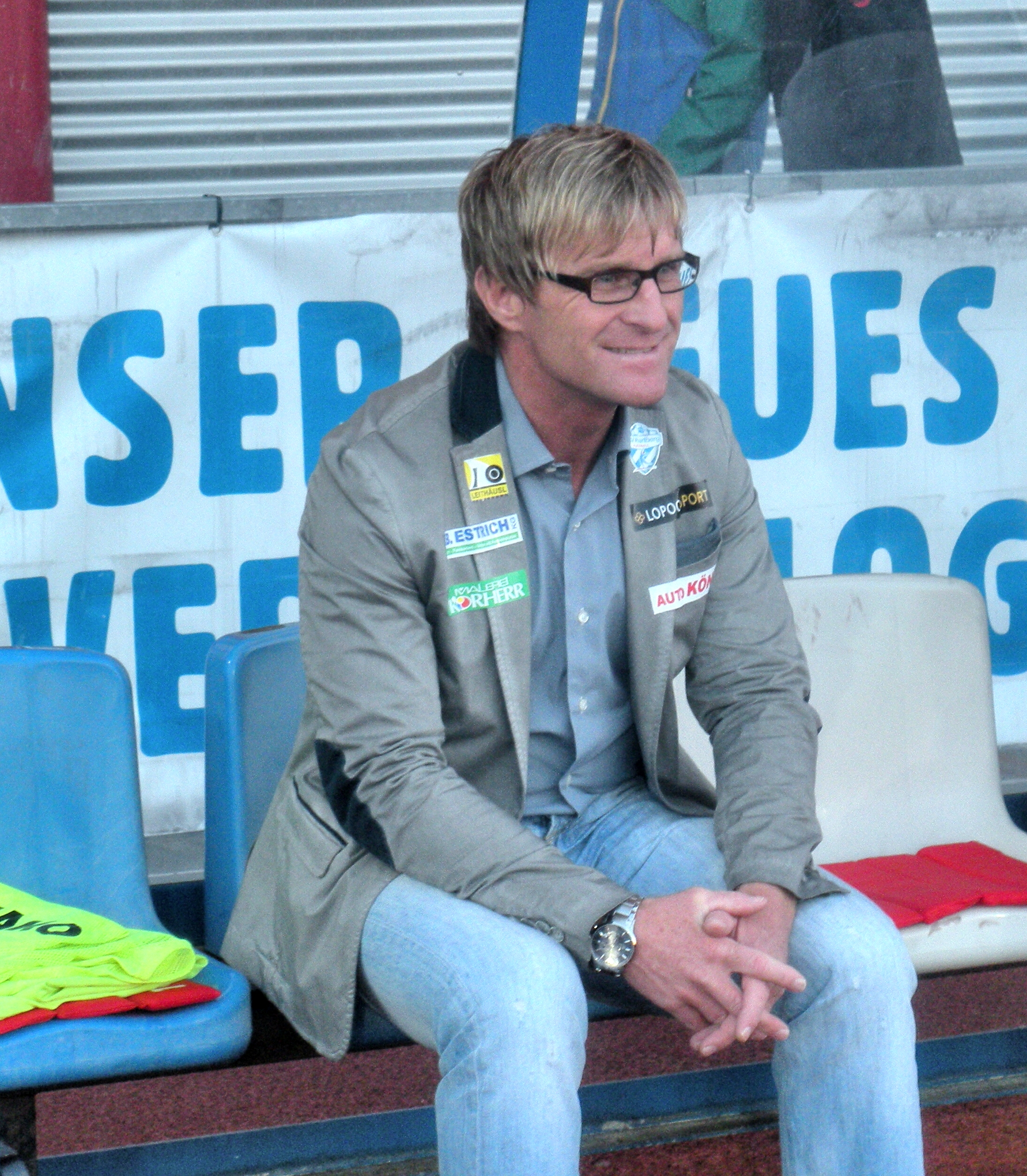
- Hörmann in 2012

Personal information
- Full name: Walter Hörmann
- Date of birth: 13 September 1961 (age 65)
- Position: Midfielder

Youth career
- SV Feldbach

Senior career*
Years	Team	Apps	(Gls)
1980–1985	Sturm Graz	132	(7)
1985–1987	St. Gallen		
1987–1992	Austria Wien	143	(3)
1992–1996	SK Sturm Graz	92	(7)
1996–1998	SV Austria Salzburg	62	(2)
1998–1999	FC Kärnten	14	(0)
1999–2000	DSV Leoben	12	(0)

International career
1984–1992	Austria	15	(0)

Managerial career
- 2001: Austria Wien
- 2002–2004: FC Vaduz
- 2003–2004: Liechtenstein
- 2004: SV Austria Salzburg (caretaker)
- 2004–2006: FC Wil
- 2006–2007: SKN St. Pölten
- 2007–2008: Sturm Graz (sporting director)
- 2008–2010: SCR Altach (sporting director)
- 2012: TSV Hartberg
- * Club domestic league appearances and goals

Walter Hörmann (born 13 September 1961) is a football coach and former player. As a player, he made 15 appearances for the Austria national team.

== Honours ==
- Austrian Football Bundesliga: three times
- Austrian Cup: three times
- Austrian Supercup: three times
