= Gilles Aubonney =

Swiss footballer (born 1958)

Personal information
- Date of birth: 5 September 1958 (age 68)
- Position: Defender

Senior career*
Years	Team	Apps	(Gls)
1978–1983	FC Fribourg		
1983–1994	FC Bulle		

Managerial career
- 1990–1993: FC Bulle (player-mng)
- * Club domestic league appearances and goals

Gilles Aubonney (born 5 September 1958) is a retired Swiss football defender.
