= Hanspeter Burri =

Swiss footballer (born 1963)

Personal information
- Date of birth: 22 December 1963 (age 62)
- Height: 1.69 m (5 ft 7 in)
- Position: Defender

Senior career*
Years	Team	Apps	(Gls)
1979–1993	FC Luzern		

International career
1989	Switzerland	1	(0)
- * Club domestic league appearances and goals

Hanspeter Burri (born 22 December 1963) is a retired Swiss football defender.
