= Giorgio Mellacina =

Swiss footballer (born 1961)

Personal information
- Date of birth: 15 January 1961 (age 65)
- Place of birth: Bellinzona, Switzerland
- Height: 1.86 m (6 ft 1 in)
- Position: Goalkeeper

Senior career*
Years	Team	Apps	(Gls)
1979–1988	AC Bellinzona		
1988–1992	FC Luzern		
- * Club domestic league appearances and goals

Giorgio Mellacina (born 15 January 1961) is a retired Swiss football goalkeeper.
