= Francois Laydu =

Swiss footballer (1960–2017)

Personal information
- Date of birth: 10 February 1960
- Date of death: March 2017
- Position: Defender

Youth career
- until 1979: FC Montreux-Sports

Senior career*
Years	Team	Apps	(Gls)
1979–1980	FC Montreux-Sports		
1980–1985	FC La Chaux-de-Fonds	160	(17)
1985–1986	FC Basel	3	(0)
1986–1990	FC Locarno	117	(1)
1990–1992	FC La Chaux-de-Fonds	24	(0)
- * Club domestic league appearances and goals

Francois Laydu (10 February 1960 – 2017) was a Swiss footballer who played in the 1980s and early 1990s as defender.

Laydu played his youth football by FC Montreux-Sports and advanced to their first team during the 1979–80 season in the 1st League. In summer 1980 he transferred to FC La Chaux-de-Fonds who played in the Nationalliga B, the second tier of Swiss football. In the 1982–83 season La Chaux-de-Fonds, with Laydu as central defender, achieved promotion to the Nationalliga A. In the following season Laydu played in all 30 of the seasons league games.

Laydu joined FC Basel's first team for their 1985–86 season under team manager Helmut Benthaus. Laydu played his domestic league debut for his new club in the home game in the St. Jakob Stadium on 17 August 1985 as Basel were defeated 0–3 by Wettingen. He stayed with the club for just twelve months, but was unable to achieve a regular place in the team. During this time Laydu played a total of 17 games for Basel without scoring a goal. Three of these games were in the Nationalliga A, one in the Swiss Cup and 13 were friendly games.

Following his time in Basel, Laydu moved on and played three and a half years for FC Locarno and then he returned to La Chaux-de-Fonds for two seasons and then he retired from active football.

After his active career, with his passion for football and his competence as an official, Laydu joined the Neuchâtel Xamax board of directors. Later he was player advisor and manager.

Following the bankruptcy of FC Lausanne-Sport, which was declared in 2003, François Laydu was administrator of the club and became sporting director. He was the origin of the rescue and notably played an important role in the reconstruction of the club.

Laydu died in March 2017 at the age of 57 after a long, incurable illness. In Laydus honor, the management of FC Lausanne-Sport stated in their tribute, his unfailing commitments during his years with the club for which he had a real passion. Further they stated, “everyone who had worked with him, still have in mind the image of a loyal and competent man, appreciated by all fellow workers.”

== Sources ==
- Francois Laydu at WorldFootball.net
- Josef Zindel (2018). FC Basel 1893. Die ersten 125 Jahre (in German). Basel: Friedrich Reinhardt Verlag. ISBN 978-3-7245-2305-5.
- Verein "Basler Fussballarchiv" Homepage
