= Stefan Bützer =

Swiss footballer (born 1965)

Personal information
- Date of birth: 17 September 1965 (age 61)
- Place of birth: Oberdiessbach, Switzerland
- Position: Midfielder

Youth career
- until 1984: BSC Young Boys

Senior career*
Years	Team	Apps	(Gls)
1984–1986	BSC Young Boys	47	(7)
1986–1988	FC Basel	65	(8)
1988–1994	FC Locarno	182	(26)
1994–1996	AC Bellinzona		
1996–1999	FC Locarno	88	(12)

International career
1985–1987	Switzerland U21	10	(3)
- * Club domestic league appearances and goals

Stefan Bützer (born 17 September 1965) is a Swiss retired footballer who played in the 1980s and 1990s as midfielder.

Bützer played for his youth football with BSC Young Boys and advanced to their first team in the summer of 1984. He played two season for YB and in the 1985–86 Nationalliga A season he played in 26 of the 30 league matches, scoring two goals, as they won the Swiss championship. He then moved on.

Bützer joined FC Basel's first team for their 1986–87 season under head-coach Helmut Benthaus. After playing in eight test games, Bützer played his domestic league debut for his new club in the first game of the season, on 9 August 1986, away from home as Basel were defeated 1–3 by Sion. Bützer scored his first goal for his club on 21 March 1987 in the away game in the Wankdorf Stadium and it was the winning goal in the last minute of the match as Basel won 1–0 against his former club Young Boys.

At the end of the following 1987–88 Nationalliga A season, under manager Urs Siegenthaler, Bützer and his team suffered relegation and he left the club. In his two-season Bützer played a total of 94 games for Basel scoring a total of 15 goals. 65 of these games were in the Nationalliga A, three in the Swiss Cup and 26 were friendly games. He scored eight goals in the domestic league, one in the Swiss Cup and the other six were scored during the test games.

Following his time with Basel, Bützer played six seasons for FC Locarno. He then played two seasons for AC Bellinzona before he returned to Locarno for another three seasons before ending his active playing career.

== Sources ==
- Die ersten 125 Jahre. Publisher: Josef Zindel im Friedrich Reinhardt Verlag, Basel. ISBN 978-3-7245-2305-5
- Verein "Basler Fussballarchiv" Homepage
