= Stefano Albertoni =

Swiss-Italian footballer

Personal information
- Date of birth: 10 April 1966 (age 60)
- Position: Midfielder

Senior career*
Years	Team	Apps	(Gls)
1985–1991	FC Sion		
1991–1993	FC Bulle		
- * Club domestic league appearances and goals

Stefano Albertoni (born 10 April 1966) is a Swiss-Italian former football midfielder.
