= Fabio Ghisoni =

Swiss footballer (born 1963)

Personal information
- Date of birth: 11 September 1963 (age 63)
- Place of birth: Switzerland
- Position: Striker

Youth career
- until 1982: FC Grenchen

Senior career*
Years	Team	Apps	(Gls)
1982–1984	FC Grenchen	43	(7)
1984–1986	FC Lengnau		
1986–1988	FC Basel	34	(2)
1988–1991	FC Emmenbrücke	85	(4)
- * Club domestic league appearances and goals

Fabio Ghisoni (born 11 September 1963) is a Swiss retired footballer who played in the 1980s and early 1990s as striker.

Ghisoni played his youth football with FC Grenchen and advanced to their first team for the 1982–83 season in the second tier of Swiss football. After two seasons he moved on to FC Lengnau one tier lower. He played here two seasons. At the end of the 1985–86 season Lengnau finished in second position in the 1st League Group 2 and qualified for the promotion play-offs. Although the team missed promotion, Ghisoni had been noted by teams in higher divisions.

Ghisoni signed his first professional contract with FC Basel and joined their first team for their 1986–87 season under head-coach Helmut Benthaus. After playing in six test games, Ghisoni played his domestic league debut for his new club in the away game on 9 August 1986 as Basel were defeated 1–3 by Sion. Ghisoni scored his first goal for his club on 7 March 1987 in the away game against Servette. But this did not save the team, because Basel were defeated 1–2. The team ended the season in 12th position in the table and therefore had to compete in the play-offs against relegation. Ghisoni played in all four play-off games and scored a goal in the final decisive game as Basel won 7–0 against Wettingen and thus avoided the drop to the lower division.

The following seasons didn't work out too well, neither for the team, nor for Ghisoni. Ghisoni played in only seven games during the first part of the season, under manager Urs Siegenthaler, and was not selected at all in the second stage. The team ended the qualification stage in second last position and had to play a relegation stage, but they could not save themselves and suffered relegation.

In his two seasons with the club, Ghisoni played a total of 50 games for Basel scoring a total of six goals. 34 of these games were in the Nationalliga A, three in the Swiss Cup and 13 were friendly games. He scored two goals in the domestic league and the other four were scored during the test games.

Following his time with Basel, Ghisoni moved on to play for FC Emmenbrücke, who also played in the Nationalliga B, the second tier of Swiss football.

== Sources ==
- Die ersten 125 Jahre. Publisher: Josef Zindel im Friedrich Reinhardt Verlag, Basel. ISBN 978-3-7245-2305-5
- Verein "Basler Fussballarchiv" Homepage
