= Dominique Herr =

Swiss footballer (born 1965)

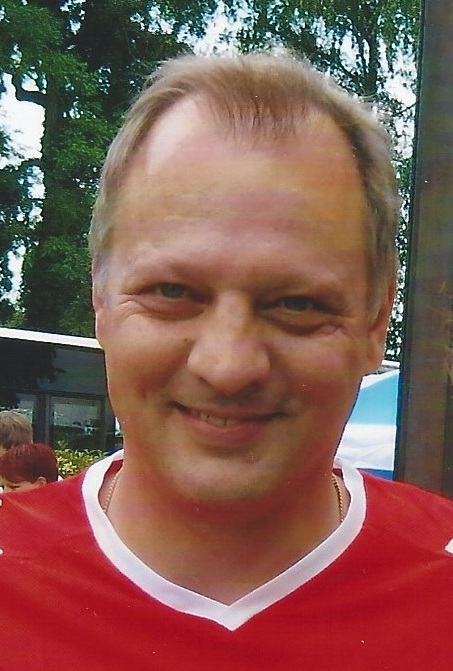

Personal information
- Date of birth: 25 October 1965 (age 61)
- Place of birth: Basel, Switzerland
- Height: 1.84 m (6 ft 0 in)
- Position: Defensive midfielder

Youth career
- –1984: FC Basel

Senior career*
Years	Team	Apps	(Gls)
1984–1988	FC Basel	76	(2)
1988–1992	Lausanne Sport	133	(9)
1992–1996	FC Sion	111	(5)
Total		320	(16)

International career
1989–1995	Switzerland	52	(4)
- * Club domestic league appearances and goals

Dominique Herr (born 25 October 1965) is a Swiss former football defensive midfielder who played throughout the 1980s and 1990s.

== Club career ==
Herr started his youth football at local club FC Basel. He advanced to their first team for their 1985–86 season and signed his first professional contract under manager Ernst-August Künnecke. Herr played his domestic league debut for the club in the home game in the St. Jakob Stadium on 9 December 1984 as Basel won 1–0 against Young Boys. In this and the following season he was a squad player, but played mainly for the FC Basel Under-21s for the first couple of seasons. In his first season Herr had just seven league appearances and in their 1985–86 season Herr had just five league appearances under head-coach Helmut Benthaus.

Herr broke into the first-team during their 1986–87 season, playing 31 games over the course of the entire campaign. He scored his first goal for his club in the last game of the regular season on 16 June 1987 in the home game in their temporary Stadion Schützenmatte. It was the 1st goal of the game, but it could not help the team because Basel were defeated 5–2 by Sion.

Basel had to compete in the play-outs against relegation. In the semi-final Herr netted his second goal for Basel in the 2–2 draw against Bulle but they continued to the final after a penalty shoot out in the 2nd leg. In this season Basel saved themselves from relegation by winning the play-out final. However Basel failed to avoid relegation to the Nationalliga B in 1988 and Herr left the club after four season in the first team.

During his time with Basel, between the years 1984 and 1988, Herr played a total of 111 games for Basel scoring a total of four goals. 76 of these games were in the Nationalliga A, four in the Swiss Cup and 31 were friendly games. He scored the mentioned two goals in the domestic league, the others were scored during the test games.

He joined Lausanne Sport who continued to play in the Nationalliga A. His first season at Stade Olympique de la Pontaise saw him achieve some excellent form and he was called up to the Switzerland national team. In Summer 1992, he signed for Swiss champions Sion where he won the Swiss Cup twice, in 1995 and 1996. Injury forced him into early retirement in 1996, aged just 30.

== International career ==
Herr was capped 52 times and scored 4 goals for the Switzerland national team between 1989 and 1995, including four games at the 1994 FIFA World Cup.

== Honours ==
FC Sion

- Swiss Cup: 1994–95, 1995–96

== Sources ==
- Die ersten 125 Jahre. Publisher: Josef Zindel im Friedrich Reinhardt Verlag, Basel. ISBN 978-3-7245-2305-5
- Verein "Basler Fussballarchiv" Homepage
