= Stefano Ceccaroni =

Swiss-Italian footballer (born 1961)

Personal information
- Full name: Stefano Ceccaroni
- Date of birth: 12 January 1961 (age 65)
- Place of birth: Basel, Switzerland
- Height: 1.77 m (5 ft 10 in)
- Positions: Defender; midfielder

Senior career*
Years	Team	Apps	(Gls)
1980–1986	FC Basel	46	(5)
1983–1984	→ FC Chiasso (loan)	18	(2)
1984–1985	→ FC Baden (loan)	27	(10)
1986–1997	FC Laufen		
1987–1998	FC Riehen		
1998–2001	Old Boys		

Managerial career
- 1998–2001: Old Boys
- 2001–2005: FC Basel (youth teams)
- 2005: Servette FC (caretaker)
- 2005–2007: BSC Young Boys assistant
- * Club domestic league appearances and goals

Stefano Ceccaroni (born 12 January 1961 in Basel) is a retired Swiss-Italian footballer and manager who played as a defender or midfielder. He spent his entire career playing in Switzerland. He is now businessman and works for the foundation of the Youth Campus Basel and is in the business management.

== Football career ==
Ceccaroni joined FC Basel's first team for their 1980–81 season under head-coach Helmut Benthaus. After playing in one test game Ceccaroni played his domestic league debut for his club in the home game in the St. Jakob Stadium on 5 April 1981. He scored his first goal for his club in the same game. It was the first goal of the match as Basel won 3–0 against FC Chiasso. Just two weeks later in the away game against Sion he was substituted in the 77th minute with the team one goal down. Ceccaroni scored the equaliser and saved his team from the defeat.

Even three years later he was not getting regular playing time, therefore the club loaned Ceccaroni out to play for Chiasso the second half of the 1983–84 Nationalliga A season. He played 18 games, scoring two goals, but the team suffered relegation. The following season Ceccaroni was loaned out to second tier FC Baden. In this season he played in 27 of the team's 30 matches and scored 10 goals and helped them win promotion.

Ceccaroni played one more season with Basel before he moved on. Between the years 1980 and 1986 Ceccaroni played a total of 90 games for Basel scoring a total of 30 goals. 46 of these games were in the Nationalliga A, seven in the Swiss Cup, one in the Swiss League Cup, three in the Cup of the Alps and 33 were friendly games. He scored five goal in the domestic league, one in the cup, one Alpencup and the other 23 were scored during the test games.

Following his time with Basel, Ceccaroni ended his professional career. He played one season semi-professional with FC Laufen. Then he played seven seasons with FC Riehen. Here he started and achieved his trainer-license. Ceccaroni then moved onto Old Boys as player-coach for two and a half seasons.

From summer 2001 FC Basel employed Ceccaroni for three and a half seasons as youth trainer. After Servette had sacked their trainer Marco Schällibaum in August 2004, Adrian Ursea took over as caretaker manager. Servette then contacted Ceccaroni, and Basel released him, and he took over as head coach until the end of the season. Following this, he was assistant trainer for BSC Young Boys and the trainer of their youth team.

Ceccaroni is a teacher and mentor. Since 2016 he works for the foundation of the Youth Campus Basel and is in the business management, he is responsible for the sector of schooling, education, the residential building and the restaurant.

Stefano is the elder brother of Massimo Ceccaroni who spent his entire professional career (1987–2002) playing with FC Basel.

== Sources ==
- Rotblau: Jahrbuch Saison 2017/2018. Publisher: FC Basel Marketing AG. ISBN 978-3-7245-2189-1
- Die ersten 125 Jahre. Publisher: Josef Zindel im Friedrich Reinhardt Verlag, Basel. ISBN 978-3-7245-2305-5
- Verein "Basler Fussballarchiv" Homepage
