= Enrique Mata (footballer) =

Spanish-Swiss footballer (born 1957)

Personal information
- Full name: Enrique Mata
- Date of birth: 10 May 1957 (age 69)
- Place of birth: Valencia, Spain
- Height: 1.74 m (5 ft 9 in)
- Positions: Midfielder; forward

Youth career
- FC Nordstern Basel

Senior career*
Years	Team	Apps	(Gls)
1977–1982	FC Nordstern Basel	102	(15)
1981–1982	FC Grenchen	15	(0)
1982–1985	Neuchâtel Xamax	86	(7)
1985–1991	FC Basel	104	(18)
1991–1992	FC Laufen		
- * Club domestic league appearances and goals

Enrique Mata (born 10 May 1957) is a Spanish-Swiss retired footballer who played in the late 1970s, the 1980s and early 1990s. He played mainly as an attacking midfielder, but also as a forward.

Mata played his youth football with FC Nordstern Basel and advanced to their first team in the 1977–78 season. At the end of that season Nordstern achieved promotion as division champions to the Nationalliga A. The following season Mata suffered relegation with Nordstern, the team coming last in the relegation round, but Mata stayed with the club. The following season Nordstern again achieved promotion as division runners-up. Mata also played the following season with the club.

But soon after the start of the 1981–82 season he moved on to FC Grenchen one league lower. Here he played for only half a year and again Mata moved on, this time to Xamax. Mata was always first choice midfielder by Xamax and played three seasons for the club.

Mata joined FC Basel's first team in their 1985–86 season under team manager Helmut Benthaus. After playing in five test games, Mata played his domestic league debut for his new club in the home game in the St. Jakob Stadium on 7 August 1985 as Basel played against Luzern. Mata scored his first goal for his club just three days later on 10 August in the away game against Vevey-Sports. It was the first goal of the game in the 6th minute, but it could not help Basel to a victory, the result was a 2–2 draw.

Mata stayed with Basel for six seasons. Mata injured himself in the 1986–87 season and this kept him out for longer than half a year. Despite suffering relegation at the end of their 1987–88 season Mata stayed with the club until the end of the 1990–91 season. Between the years 1985 and 1991 Mata played a total of 173 games for Basel scoring a total of 30 goals; 104 of these games were in the Nationalliga A, 14 in the Swiss Cup and 55 were friendly games. He scored 18 goals in the domestic league, five in the cup and the other seven were scored during the test games.

After his time with Basel, Mata retired from professional football and moved on and he played one season for local team FC Laufen in the 1st League.

== Sources ==
- Rotblau: Jahrbuch Saison 2017/2018. Publisher: FC Basel Marketing AG. ISBN 978-3-7245-2189-1
- Die ersten 125 Jahre. Publisher: Josef Zindel im Friedrich Reinhardt Verlag, Basel. ISBN 978-3-7245-2305-5
- Verein "Basler Fussballarchiv" Homepage
