= André Ladner =

Swiss footballer (1962–2025)

Personal information
- Date of birth: 20 May 1962
- Date of death: 29 July 2025 (aged 63)
- Height: 1.80 m (5 ft 11 in)
- Position: Defender

Youth career
- until 1980: Grasshopper Club

Senior career*
Years	Team	Apps	(Gls)
1980–1985	Grasshopper Club	93	(4)
1985–1987	FC Basel	58	(3)
1987–1991	FC Lugano	132	(0)

International career
1985	Switzerland U21	1	(0)
1983	Switzerland	4	(0)

Managerial career
- 2008–2010: FC Zürich (assistant)
- 2016–2017: FC Aarau (assistant)
- 2017–2018: FC United Zürich
- 2018–2019: FC Zürich Frauen
- * Club domestic league appearances and goals

André Ladner (20 May 1962 – 29 July 2025) was a Swiss professional footballer who played during the 1980s and early 1990s as a defender. He made four appearances for the Switzerland national team.

== Club career ==
Ladner played his youth football with Grasshopper Club and advanced to their first team during the 1980–81 Nationalliga A season. He played for the Grasshoppers for five seasons. The first season they were runners-up in the league and during the following seasons they were champions three times in a row. Furthermore, in the 1982–83 season they won the double, winning the Swiss Cup final 3–0 against Servette.

Ladner joined FC Basel's first team in their 1985–86 season under manager Helmut Benthaus. Ladner played his domestic league debut for his new club in the home game in the St. Jakob Stadium on 31 August 1985 as Basel won 1–0 against Sion. He scored his first goal for the club on 21 September in the Swiss Cup as Basel won 9–1 against lower tier local club Concordia Basel. He scored his first league goal for his club on 22 March 1986 in the away game as Basel won 2–1 against Servette and it was the winning goal of the match.

He stayed with the club for two seasons and during this time Ladner played a total of 86 games for Basel scoring a total of six goals. 58 of these games were in the Nationalliga A, eight in the Swiss Cup and 20 were friendly games. He scored three goals in the domestic league, one in the cup and the other two were scored during the test games.

Following his time with Basel, Ladner moved on to play four seasons for FC Lugano before he ended his active playing career.

== International career ==
Ladner was called up to play for his country in the 1982–83 season. He played his debut for Switzerland on 26 October 1983 as the Swiss won 2–0 against Yugoslavia. In total he played four matches for the Swiss team. One year later he played one game for the Swiss U-21 team.

== Trainer career ==
Ladner later obtained his trainer license and between July 2008 and June 2010 he was assistant to Bernard Challandes by Zürich. Between January 2016 and June 2017 he was assistant to Marco Schällibaum by Aarau. Between July 2017 and June 2018 Ladner was manager of FC United Zürich. Beginning in July 2018 Ladner was trainer for the ladies' team FC Zürich Frauen.

== Death ==
Ladner died on 29 July 2025.

== Honours ==
- Swiss champions: 1981–82, 1982–83, 1983–84
- Swiss Cup: 1982–83

== Sources ==
- André Ladner at National-Football-Teams.com
- André Ladner at WorldFootball.net
- Die ersten 125 Jahre (in German). Basel: Josef Zindel im Friedrich Reinhardt Verlag. ISBN 978-3-7245-2305-5.
