= Gerd Strack =

German footballer (1955–2020)

Personal information
- Full name: Gerhard Strack
- Date of birth: 1 September 1955
- Place of birth: Kerpen, West Germany
- Date of death: 21 May 2020 (aged 64)
- Place of death: Germany
- Height: 1.86 m (6 ft 1 in)
- Position: Defender

Youth career
- 1961–1966: Glückauf Habbelrath-Grefrath
- 1966–1973: SpVg Frechen 20
- 1973–1974: 1. FC Köln

Senior career*
Years	Team	Apps	(Gls)
1974–1985	1. FC Köln	261	(31)
1985–1987	FC Basel	48	(9)
1987–1988	Fortuna Düsseldorf	17	(2)
Total		326	(42)

International career
1982–1983	West Germany	10	(1)
- * Club domestic league appearances and goals

Gerhard "Gerd" Strack (1 September 1955 – 21 May 2020) was a German footballer who played as a defender in the 1970s and 1980s.

== Club career ==
Strack played his youth football at locals clubs Glückauf Habbelrath-Grefrath (until 1966) und SpVg Frechen 20 (until 1973). He played one season by the youth of 1. FC Köln before he advanced to their first team. Strack played as a defender. Strack played eleven seasons in Köln. He played 339 games for them, of which 261 were in the Bundesliga. He scored 46 goals, of which 31 were in the Bundesliga. With Köln Strack won the DFB-Pokal three times and were German champions once.

Strack joined FC Basel's first team in for their 1985–86 season under manager Helmut Benthaus. Strack played his domestic league debut for his new club in the home game at the St. Jakob-Park on 7 August 1975 as Basel were defeated 0–1 by FC Luzern. He scored his first goal for his club a few weeks later on 4 September in the away game as Basel played a 1–1 draw against St. Gallen.

During the two seasons with Basel, Strack played a total of 71 games scoring a total of 17 goals. 48 of these games were in the Nationalliga A, six in the Swiss Cup and 17 were friendly games. He scored nine goal in the domestic league, three in the cup and the other five were scored during the test games.

After his time with Basel, Strack returned to Germany and played the 1987–88 season in the 2. Bundesliga with Fortuna Düsseldorf.

== International career ==
He earned ten caps and scored one goal for West Germany from 1982 to 1983, and was included in the West German team for the UEFA Euro 1984, but did not play.

The one goal he scored, against Albania in a European Championship qualifier in Saarbrücken on 20 November 1983, was vital: it gave West Germany a 2–1 win and ensured that they qualified for Euro 1984 ahead of Northern Ireland.

== Sources ==
- Die ersten 125 Jahre. Publisher: Josef Zindel im Friedrich Reinhardt Verlag, Basel. ISBN 978-3-7245-2305-5
- FCB homepage: Gerd Strack mit nur 64 Jahren gestorben
