= Steen Thychosen =

Danish footballer (born 1958)

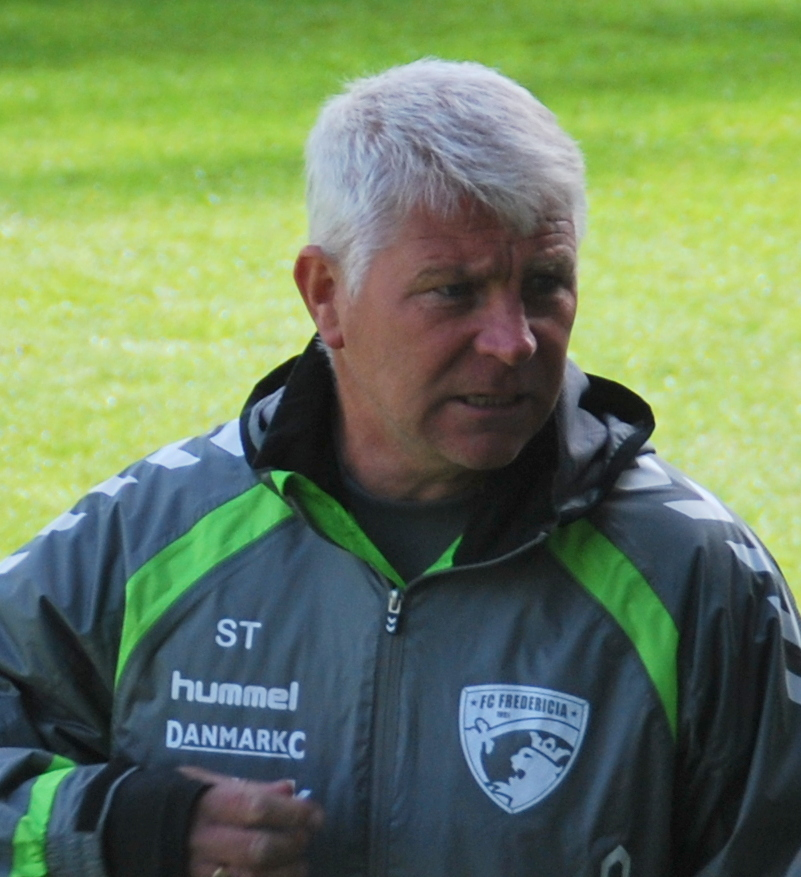
- FC Fredericia manager, 2012

Personal information
- Full name: Steen Thychosen
- Date of birth: 22 September 1958 (age 68)
- Place of birth: Vejle, Denmark
- Position: Striker

Senior career*
Years	Team	Apps	(Gls)
1976–1978	Vejle		
1978–1981	Borussia Mönchengladbach	26	(2)
1981–1983	RWD Molenbeek	53	(14)
1983–1985	Vejle	42	(28)
1985–1987	Lausanne	136	(79)
1987–1992	Vejle		

International career
1974–1975	Denmark U17	2	(1)
1974–1977	Denmark U19	33	(11)
1978–1984	Denmark U21	7	(3)
1984–1986	Denmark	2	(0)

Managerial career
- 2003–2004: Vejle BK
- 2003–2004: Vejle BK (athletic supervisor)
- 2008–2009: FC Fredericia (forward coach)
- 2009–2014: FC Fredericia (assistant)
- 2013: FC Fredericia (caretaker)
- 2014: Vejle BK (chiefscout)
- 2014–: Vejle BK (athletic supervisor)
- 2016: Vejle BK (caretaker)
- * Club domestic league appearances and goals

Steen Thychosen (born 22 September 1958) is a Danish former footballer, who played 252 games and scored 101 goals for Vejle Boldklub. He was a forward, who also represented German club Borussia Mönchengladbach, Belgian club RWD Molenbeek and Lausanne in Switzerland. He played two games for the Denmark national football team.

== Honours ==
Vejle

- Danish 1st Division: 1978, 1984
- Danish Cup: 1976–77

Borussia Mönchengladbach

- UEFA Cup: 1978–79

Individual

- Danish 1st Division top scorer: 1984 (24 goals, Vejle)
- Swiss National League A top scorer: 1985–86 (21 goals, Lausanne Sports)
