= Beat Sutter =

Swiss footballer (born 1962)

Personal information
- Date of birth: 12 December 1962 (age 63)
- Place of birth: Gelterkinden, Switzerland
- Height: 1.84 m (6 ft 1/2 in)
- Position: Striker

Youth career
- 1970–1981: FC Gelterkinden

Senior career*
Years	Team	Apps	(Gls)
1981–1986	FC Basel	114	(35)
1986–1994	Neuchâtel Xamax	223	(67)
1994–1995	Yverdon-Sport FC	29	(10)
1995–1996	FC St. Gallen	29	(2)
Total		395	(114)

International career
1983–1994	Switzerland	60	(12)
- * Club domestic league appearances and goals

Beat Sutter (born 12 December 1962) is a Swiss former football striker who played throughout the 1980s and 1990s.

Sutter began his career with FC Basel in 1981 and went on to play 114 matches for the club before he left to join Neuchâtel Xamax in 1986. He spent the best years of his career at Xamax, playing over 200 games there. In 1994, he signed for Yverdon-Sport FC, but he spent just one season there and moved on to FC St. Gallen in 1995. He scored twice in 29 appearances for St. Gallen and retired in 1996, aged 33.

== Honours ==
Neuchâtel Xamax

- Swiss Super League: 1986–87, 1987–88
- Swiss Super Cup: 1987, 1988, 1990
