= Swiss Super Cup =

- First season: 1986
- Folded: 1990
- Country: Switzerland
- Number of clubs: 2
- Last champions: Neuchâtel Xamax
- Most championships: Neuchâtel Xamax (3)

The Swiss SuperCup was a match that was played between the winners of the Swiss Super League and the Swiss Cup. It was held from 1986 to 1990.

== Winners ==
Year	Winner	Score	Finalist
1986	BSC Young Boys	3–1	FC Sion
1987	Neuchâtel Xamax	3–0	BSC Young Boys
1988	Neuchâtel Xamax	2–2 (5–2 pen.)	Grasshopper Club Zürich
1989	Grasshopper Club Zürich	4–2	FC Luzern
1990	Neuchâtel Xamax	1–1 (4–3 pen.)	Grasshopper Club Zürich

== Total Titles ==
Club	Titles
Neuchâtel Xamax	3
Grasshopper Club Zürich	1
BSC Young Boys	1
