= 1983–84 FC Basel season =

FC Basel
1983–84 season
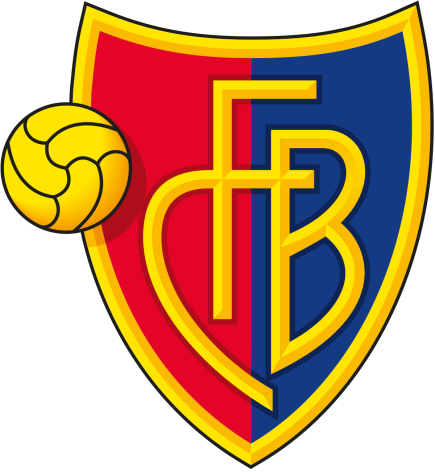
- Chairman: Urs Gribi
- Manager: Ernst August Künnecke
- Ground: St. Jakob Stadium, Basel
- Nationalliga A: 9th of 16
- Swiss Cup: Round 4
- Top goalscorer: League: Beat Sutter (12); All: Beat Sutter (14)
- Highest home attendance: 10,000 on 4 October 1983 vs Servette
- Lowest home attendance: 2,000 on 6 June 1984 vs Bellinzona
- Average home league attendance: 5.553

The Fussball Club Basel 1893 1983–84 season was their 90th season since the club was founded. It was their 38th consecutive season in the top flight of Swiss football, following their promotion at the end of the 1945–46 seasom. They played their home games in the former St. Jakob Stadium, situated about three kilometers south-east of the city-centre. Urs Gribi was their newly appointed chairman, he replaced Roland Rasi who stood down at the AGM after just one year chairmanship.

== Overview ==
=== Pre-season ===
Ernst August Künnecke was appointed as Basel’s new first team manager and Emil Müller was appointed as his assistant. They had taken over from Rainer Ohlhauser, who had been manager for just the previous season. Künnecke had not played as professional footballer, but had played in the highest amateur levels before becoming professional head coach in Belgium. Künnecke's reputation grew because of his conveyance, his advancing and his greatest strength was the furtherance of young players. Waterschei Thor and KV Mechelen were two of Künnecke's stations in Belgium and that is the reason why Basel played two test games against these teams during the first half of the season.

A number of players left the squad. Hans Küng retired after having been with the club six years and playing in a total of 252 games, of which 154 in the Nationalliga A and 16 were in the European competitions (European Cup, UEFA Cup and Cup of the Alps). Peter Marti move to Aarau after having been with the club seven years, playing in 262 games of which 146 in the Nationalliga A and 29 in the European competitions. Serge Duvernois and Serge Gaisser moved on to play for FC Mulhouse. Further Bruno Graf moved to Wettingen, Winfried Berkemeier to FC Raron and Roger Bossert to local club FC Laufen. In the other direction a number of new players joined the club. Three came from Wettingen, goalkeeper Urs Suter and the two defenders Martin Andermatt and Rolf Lauper. Uwe Dreher joined from Stuttgarter Kickers and René Botteron from 1. FC Nürnberg. Two youngsters were brought in from local clubs, Thomas Süss from Nordstern Basel and Fredy Grossenbacher from Concordia Basel. Another youngster, Peter Nadig, advanced from Basel's own youth team.

The FCB first team competed in this years domestic first-tier 1983–84 Nationalliga A, with the clear intention of retaining their top level status and reaching the top half of the table. The team also competed in the 1983–84 Swiss Cup with the intention of reaching at least the quarter-finals. They had not qualified for any of the UEFA European tournaments and they did neither enter the 1983 Intertoto Cup nor the Cup of the Alps.

Künnecke coached Basel in a total of 58 games in their 1983–84 season. 30 matches were played in the domestic league, two in the Swiss Cup and 26 were friendly matches. Of their 26 test games, 17 ended with a victory, one was drawn and eight ended with a defeat. The team scored 88 goals in these test matches and conceded 42. Only two of these test games were played at home in St. Jakob Stadium, the pre-season match against Celtic and the end of season game against local team Nordstern Basel. The others games were all played away. Under these were the two games in the Uhrencup which Basel won, 3–2 against Grenchen in the semi-final and 1–0 against Zürich in the final.

=== Domestic league ===
The 1983–84 Nationalliga A was contested by 16 teams, including the top 14 clubs from the previous season and the two sides promoted from the second level 1982–83 Nationalliga B, these being La Chaux-de-Fonds and Chiasso. The league was contested in a double round robin format, with each club playing every other club twice, home and away. Two points were awarded for a win and one point given to each team for a draw. The champions would be qualified for 1984–85 European Cup and the next two teams in the league would be qualified for the 1984–85 UEFA Cup.

As the season advanced it became increasingly apparent that Künnecke's ideas were not reaching the entire team squad at all times. Basel's youngsters played well during this season, Fredy Grossenbacher, Martin Jeitziner, Peter Nadig, Thomas Hauser and Beat Sutter advanced well under Künnecke. But Künnecke's ideas were not being accepted by the older, experienced players. At home, in the St. Jakob Stadium the team was playing well and winning the games, the first five home games were all won. However, the first seven away games all ended with a defeat. After the winter break Basel lost their first home game against La Chaux-de-Fonds 0–1. Künnecke reacted immediately and this was the last game that the three veterans Arthur von Wartburg, Jörg Stohler and Jean-Pierre Maradan played in the team. The supporters had noted the differences and the final home game of the season attracted only 2,000 spectators. Basel ended the season in ninth position. In their 30 league games Basel won eleven matches, drew six and lost thirteen. Basel obtained 28 points, scored 55 and conceding 59 goals. They were 16 points behind Grasshopper Club and Servette both of whom finished level on 44 points. A play-off match was to decide the championship and this was who by the Grasshoppers who became champions for the second consecutive year. Bellinzona and Chiasso suffered relegation.

=== Swiss Cup ===
Basel entered into the Swiss Cup in the round of 64 and here they were drawn away against local lower league club FC Birsfelden. The match was a one-sided affair and Basel won 8–0. In the round of 32 they had a home fixture against Luzern but were beaten 0–3. Servette won the Cup beating Lausanne-Sport 1–0 in the final. As Cup winners Servette were qualified for the 1984–85 Cup Winners' Cup. Basel did not play in any other cup competitions because the Swiss League Cup was no longer competed and because they were not qualified for European competitions, nor did they enter the Coppa delle Alpi this season.

== Players ==
The following is the list of the Basel first team squad during the season 1983–84. The list includes players that were in the squad on the day that the Nationalliga A season started on 10 August 1983 but subsequently left the club after that date.

Note: Flags indicate national team as defined under FIFA eligibility rules; some limited exceptions apply. Players may hold more than one non-FIFA nationality.

No.	Pos.	Nation	Player
1	GK	SUI	Hans Müller
1	GK	SUI	Thomas Paul
1	GK	SUI	Urs Suter (from Wettingen)
2	DF	SUI	Walter Geisser
3	DF	GER	Thomas Süss (from Nordstern Basel)
4	DF	SUI	Martin Andermatt (from Wettingen)
5	DF	SUI	Jörg Stohler
6	DF	SUI	Fredy Grossenbacher (from Concordia Basel)
7	MF	SUI	Martin Jeitziner
8	FW	SUI	Beat Sutter
9	FW	GER	Uwe Dreher (from Stuttgarter Kickers)
10	MF	SUI	Arthur von Wartburg
11	FW	SUI	Ruedi Zbinden

No.	Pos.	Nation	Player
12	DF	SUI	Jean-Pierre Maradan
13	DF	SUI	Alfred Lüthi
14	DF	SUI	Rolf Lauper (from Wettingen)
15	MF	GER	Thomas Hauser
15	MF	SUI	Nicolas Keller
16	MF	SUI	Peter Nadig (from youth team)
17	MF	SUI	René Botteron (from 1. FC Nürnberg)
18	MF	SUI	Erni Maissen
19	MF	SUI	Guido Rudin
—	DF	SUI	Stefano Ceccaroni (to Chiasso)
—		SUI	Felix Rudin
—		SUI	Thomas Schneider

Players who left the squad

Note: Flags indicate national team as defined under FIFA eligibility rules; some limited exceptions apply. Players may hold more than one non-FIFA nationality.

No.	Pos.	Nation	Player
—	GK	SUI	Hans Küng (retired)
—	DF	FRA	Serge Duvernois (to FC Mulhouse)
—	DF	SUI	Bruno Graf (to Wettingen)

No.	Pos.	Nation	Player
—	MF	GER	Winfried Berkemeier (to FC Raron)
—	MF	SUI	Roger Bossert (to FC Laufen)
—	MF	FRA	Serge Gaisser (to FC Mulhouse)
—	FW	SUI	Peter Marti (to Aarau)

== Results ==
Legend

Win Draw Loss Postponed

=== Friendly matches ===
==== Pre- and mid-season ====
3 July 1983 Pre-season	Basel (Switzerland)	1–2	(Switzerland) Zürich	Linden, Gunzwil
15:30	Sutter 9' (1:0)	FCZ summary Summary	18' (1:1) Iselin; 88' (1:2) Bold	Attendance: 1,000 bis 1,500; Referee: (Switzerland) Rudolf Renggli (Stans and Luzern)

10 July 1983 Pre-season	FC Mulhouse (France)	4–0	(Switzerland) Basel	Stade de l'Ill, Mulhouse
19:00	Six 8' (1:0); Gaisser 32' (2:0); Erlacher 69' (3:0); Maradan 87' (o.g. 4:0)	FCB summary		Attendance: 3,900; Referee: (France) Robert Wurtz
Note: Exhibition game because of the transfers of Serge Gaisser and Serge Duvernois

12 July 1983 Pre-season	FC Löffingen (Germany)	1–9	(Switzerland) Basel	Haslachstadion, Löffingen
19:00	Farace 76' (1:7)	FCB summary	14' (0:1) Hauser; 33' (0:2) Dreher; 36' (0:3) Dreher; 42' (0:4) Dreher; 68' (0:5) Nadig; 72' (0:6) Stohler; 76' (0:7) Dreher; 88' (1:8) Dreher; 89' (1:9) Zbinden	Attendance: 300; Referee: (Germany) Weiland

14 July 1983 Pre-season	FV Zell-Weierbach (Germany)	1–3	(Switzerland) Basel	Abtsbergstadion, Zell-Weierbach
18:30	Pitroc 49' (1:2)	FCB summary	18' (0:1) Zbinden; 20' (0:2) Zbinden; 71' (1:3) Ceccaroni	Attendance: 500; Referee: (Germany) Fiss

16 July 1983 Pre-season	Schaffhausen (Switzerland)	0–9	(Switzerland) Basel	Stadion Breite, Schaffhausen
18:00		FCB summary	5' (0:1) Sutter; 24' (0:2) Zbinden; 32' (0:3) Sutter; 49' (0:4) Nadig; 52' (0:5) Ceccaroni; 62' (0:6) Lüthi; 73' (0:7) Nadig; 76' (0:8) Ceccaroni; 87' (0:9) Ceccaroni	Attendance: 658; Referee: (Switzerland) Roland Gnägi

23 July 1983 Pre-season	Basel (Switzerland)	2–0	(Scotland) Celtic	St. Jakob Stadium, Basel
17:30	Dreher 47' (1:0); Dreher 76' (2:0)	FCB summary		Attendance: 3,500; Referee: (Switzerland) Rolf Blattmann

27 July 1983 Uhrencup semi-final	Grenchen (Switzerland)	2–3	(Switzerland) Basel	Stadion Brühl, Grenchen
20:00	Lehnherr 23' (1:1); Urs Moser 67' (2:3)	FCB summary	6' (0:1) von Wartburg; 42' (1:2) Hauser; 52' (1:3) Geisser	Attendance: 2,000; Referee: (Switzerland) Gottfried Friedrich (Seedorf, Uri)
Note: The Uhrencup is a former club football tournament that was held annually in Grenchen in Switzerland

30 July 1983 Pre-season	VfL Bochum (Germany)	2–1	(Switzerland) Basel	Möslestadion, Freiburg im Breisgau
20:00	Kühn 49' (1:1); Habig 88' (2:1)	FCB summary	20' (0:1) Dreher	Attendance: 3,000; Referee: (Germany) Hans-Jürgen Ortlieb

31 July 1983 Pre-season	Freiburger FC (Germany)	4–4 (4–3 p)	(Switzerland) Basel	Möslestadion, Freiburg im Breisgau
16:00	Respondek 12' (1:0); Respondek 25' (2:0); Derigs 59' (3:2); Wuchrer 78' (4:4)	FCB summary	(penalty missed) 40′ Stohler; 51' (2:1) Dreher; 57' (2:2) Andermatt; 60' (3:3) Dreher; 77' (3:4) Sutter	Attendance: 1,500; Referee: (Germany) Frai
	Penalties
	Derigs (penalty scored); Turunen (penalty missed); Schneider (penalty scored); Wuchrer (penalty scored); Zürn (penalty scored)		(penalty scored) Botteron; (penalty scored) Maradan; (penalty scored) Zbinden; (penalty missed) Sutter; (penalty missed) Lauper
Note: 40th minute: Jörg Stohler's penalty kick goes wide of the goal.

4 August 1983 Uhrencup final	Basel (Switzerland)	1–0	(Switzerland) Zürich	Stadion Brühl, Grenchen
20:00	Maradan 60' (1:0)	FCB summary FCZ summary		Attendance: 3,400; Referee: (Switzerland) Werner Liebi (Thun)
Note: The Uhrencup is a former club football tournament that was held annually in Grenchen in Switzerland. Federal Councillor Willi Ritschard was among the guests of honour.

6 August 1983 Pre-season	Basel (Switzerland)	1–4	(Germany) 1. FC Kaiserslautern	Oberfeldstadion, Schopfheim
18:00	Zbinden 24' (1:0)	FCB summary	31' (1:1) Frowein; 66' (1:2) Briegel; 70' (1:3) Melzer; 90' (1:4) Nilsson	Attendance: 2,700; Referee: (Germany) Ehrenfried Grether

6 October 1983 Mid-season	Basel (Switzerland)	6–3	(Switzerland) SC Ciba-Geigy Rosental	Basel
	Hauser (6x)	FCB summary	(2x) Lehmann (1x) Flückiger	Referee: (Switzerland) Peter Bochsler

11 October 1983 Mid-season	FC Altstätten (St. Gallen) (Switzerland)	2–4	(Switzerland) Basel	Altstätten
19:00	Buschor 10' (1:1); Schmid 16' (2:1)	FCB summary	8' (0:1) Hauser; 49' (2:2) Hauser; 65' (2:3) Ceccaroni; 70' (2:4) Stohler	Attendance: 600; Referee: (Switzerland) Roland Gnägi
Note: Torrential rain during the first half.

4 November 1983 Mid-season	KV Mechelen (Belgium)	3–2	(Switzerland) Basel	Mechelen, Belgium
20:00	(1:1) (2:1) (3:1)	FCB summary	(0:1) von Wartburg

5 November 1983 Mid-season	Waterschei Thor (Belgium)	2–0	(Switzerland) Basel	Genk, Belgium
20:00	Goal	FCB summary		Referee: (Belgium) Ignace Goris (Genk)

==== Winter break and mid-season ====
1 February 1984 Winter break	SV Bühlertal (Germany)	2–6	(Switzerland) Basel	Bühl, Germany
18:00	Keller (1:5); Keller (2:6)	FCB summary	6' (0:1) Zbinden; 15' (0:2) Zbinden; 43' (0:3) Jeitziner; 45' (0:4) Stohler; 50' (0:5) Sutter; 65' (1:6) Nadig

4 February 1984 Winter break	FV Lörrach (Germany)	1–4	(Switzerland) Basel	Grüttpark-Stadion, Lörrach Germany
14:30	Hild 32' (1:2)	FCB summary	8' (pen. 0:1) Stohler; 25' (0:2) Sutter; 37' (1:3) Sutter; 72' (1:4) Nadig	Attendance: 300; Referee: (Germany) Bruno Sahner

12 February 1984 Winter break	Basel (Switzerland)	1–1	(Switzerland) Young Boys	Margelacker, Muttenz
14:30	Maissen 13' (1:0)	FCB summary	39' (1:1) Nickel	Attendance: 500; Referee: (Switzerland) Rolf Blattmann (Zeiningen)
Note: Basel player Ruedi Zbinden had to leave the game in the 13th minute due to injury and was taken to Burderholz Hospital to determine the apparently serious injury to his right ankle (tendon surgery).

14 February 1984 Winter break	Biel-Bienne (Switzerland)	2–5	(Switzerland) Basel	Gurzelen Stadion, Biel/Bienne
	Greub 34' (1:2); Greub 69' (2:3)	FCB summary	7' (0:1) Dreher; 22' (0:2) Dreher; 66' (1:3) Stohler; 79' (2:4) Dreher; 84' (2:5) Dreher	Attendance: 150; Referee: (Switzerland) Manfred Schlup (Grenchen)

18 February 1984 Winter break	Bellinzona (Switzerland)	0–1	(Switzerland) Basel	Stadio Comunale Bellinzona, Bellinzona
14:30		FCB summary	73' (0:1) Nadig; (yellow card) 80' Müller	Attendance: 300; Referee: (Switzerland) Renzo Peduzzi (Roveredo)

19 February 1984 Winter break	Lugano (Switzerland)	3–1	(Switzerland) Basel	Cornaredo, Lugano
14:30	D. Bullo 34' (1:1); Maccini 81' (2:1); Roncari 84' (3:1)	FCB summary	2' (0:1) Jeitziner	Attendance: 100; Referee: (Switzerland) Marco Raveglia (San Vittore)

6 March 1984 Mid-season	Basel (Switzerland)	5–1	(Switzerland) Nordstern Basel	St. Jakob Stadium, Basel
19:00	Dreher 46' (1:1); Maissen 49' (2:1); Nadig 67' (3:1); Nadig 74' (4:1); Dreher 86' (5:1)	FCB summary	20' (0:1) Moritz	Attendance: 400; Referee: (Switzerland) André Reck

28 March 1984 Mid-season	Nordstern Basel (Switzerland)	1–4	(Switzerland) Basel	Stadion Rankhof, Basel
20:00	Marti 38' (1:3)	FCB summary	17' (0:1) Dreher; 24' (0:2) Dreher; 33' (0:3) Sutter; 67' (1:4) Nadig	Attendance: 400; Referee: (Switzerland) Peter Bochsler (Basel)

19 April 1984 Mid-season	Winterthur (Switzerland)	1–5	(Switzerland) Basel	Schützenwiese, Winterthur
17:00	Avesani 12' (1:0)	FCB summary	17' (1:1) Zbinden; 43' (1:2) Zbinden; 61' (1:3) Andermatt; 75' (1:4) Sutter; 77' (1:5) Sutter	Attendance: 800; Referee: (Switzerland) Willi Jaus (Feldmeilen)

25 May 1984 Mid-season	Concordia Basel (Switzerland)	0–5	(Switzerland) Basel	Basel
19:00		FCB summary	(0:1) Hauser (0:2) Jeitziner (0:3) Maissen (0:4) Nadig (0:5) Zbinden
Note: Playing time 2 x 40 minutes

29 May 1984 Mid-season	Old Boys (Switzerland)	0–6	(Switzerland) Basel	Basel
20:15		FCB summary	(3x) Francois (1x) Maissen (1x) Andermatt (1x) Lauper
Note: Basel with test player Francois

=== Nationalliga A ===
==== League matches ====
10 August 1983 Round 1	Bellinzona	4–2	Basel	Stadio Comunale, Bellinzona
20:30	Tedeschi 8' (1:0); Kurz 13' (2:0); Tedeschi 15' (3:0); Weidle 60' (4:0)	FCB summary	(penalty missed) 28′ Maradan; 61' (4:1) Sutter; 83' (4:2) Dreher	Attendance: 4,500; Referee: (Switzerland) Claude Gachoud
Note: 28th minute: Maradan missed the handball penalty. Bellinzona goalkeeper Mauro Benzoni saved it.

13 August 1983 Round 2	Basel	5–2	Luzern	St. Jakob Stadium, Basel
20:00	Dreher 6' (pen. 1:0); Jeitziner 25' (2:0); Sutter 56' (3:0); Andermatt 59' (4:0); Sutter 65' (5:0)	FCB summary	79' (5:1) Risi; 85' (5:2) Kasa	Attendance: 9,000; Referee: (Switzerland) André Daina

20 August 1983 Round 3	St. Gallen	4–2	Basel	Espenmoos, St. Gallen
17:30	Gisinger 25' (1:0); Gisinger 40' (2:0); Braschler 57' (3:0); Braschler 80' (4:2); Urban (yellow card) 83'	FCB summary	(yellow card) 50' Süss; 65' (2:1) Sutter; 71' (3:2) Dreher	Attendance: 10,200; Referee: (Switzerland) Peter Hauser

23 August 1983 Round 4	Basel	2–0	Young Boys	St. Jakob Stadium, Basel
20:00	Dreher 42' (1:0); Maissen 79' (2:0)	FCB summary	(yellow card) 7' Zahnd; (yellow card) 37' Brodard	Attendance: 8,000; Referee: (Switzerland) Jakob Baumann (Schaffhausen)
Note: Maissen (200th NLA game) honored before the match.

27 August 1983 Round 5	Xamax	2–0	Basel	Stade de la Maladière (1924), Neuchâtel
20:30	Mustapha (penalty missed) 17′ Lüthi 32' (1:0); Mustapha 60' (2:0); Zwygart (penalty missed) 81′	FCB summary	(yellow card) 21' Zbinden; (yellow card) 55' Sutter	Attendance: 7,500; Referee: (Switzerland) Franz Gächter (Aarau, Suhr, Aargau)
Note: 200th game for Walter Geisser for FC Basel. 17th minute: FCB goalkeeper Urs Suter saves Mustapha Yaghcha's penalty. 81st minute: Charles Zwygart hits the post with his penalty. Corner 10:4.

3 September 1983 Round 6	Basel	5–2	Vevey-Sports	St. Jakob Stadium, Basel
20:00	Sutter 16' (1:0); Sutter 31' (2:0); Maissen 42' (3:0); Dreher 49' (4:0); Dreher 65' (5:1)	FCB summary	(penalty missed) 12′ Franz; 60' (4:1) Jacobacci; 72' (5:2) Jacobacci	Attendance: 3,500; Referee: (Switzerland) Renzo Peduzzi (Roveredo)
Note: 12th minute: Hans Franz missed the penalty kick, shooting over the goal. Corners: 9:2.

17 September 1983 Round 7	Zürich	2–1	Basel	Letzigrund, Zürich
20:00	Jerković 13' (1:1); Landolt (yellow card) 33'; Rufer 75' (2:1)	FCZ summary FCB summary	3' (0:1) Sutter; (yellow card) 81' Zbinden	Attendance: 6,500; Referee: (Switzerland) André Daina (Éclépens)
Note: Corners 6:3.

24 September 1983 Round 8	Basel	4–1	Chiasso	St. Jakob Stadium, Basel
20:00	Dreher 12' (1:0); Maissen 61' (2:0); Dreher 73' (3:0) von Wartburg 80' (pen. 4:0)	FCB summary	(yellow card) 34' Morini; (yellow card) 74' Mastrodonato; 81' (4:1) Tami	Attendance: 4,200; Referee: (Switzerland) Willy Hänni, (Cugy)
Note: Corners: 15:3

1 October 1983 Round 9	Aarau	4–0	Basel	Stadion Brügglifeld, Aarau
20:00	Seiler 64' (1:0); Seiler 67' (2:0); Seiler 75' (3:0); Staub (yellow card) 83'; Seiler 89' (4:0)	FCB summary FCA summary	(yellow card) 18' Maradan; (yellow card) 22' Maissen; (yellow card) 83' Sutter	Attendance: 6,700; Referee: (Switzerland) Arturo Martino (Neukirch an der Thur)

4 October 1983 Round 10	Basel	3–2	Servette	St. Jakob Stadium, Basel
20:00	Sutter 52' (1:2); Sutter 72' (2:2); Andermatt 79' (3:2)	FCB summary	33' (0:1) Elia; 41' (0:2) Elia	Attendance: 10,000; Referee: (Switzerland) Philippe Mercier (Pully)

23 October 1983 Round 11	Lausanne-Sport	4–0	Basel	Olympique de la Pontaise, Lausanne
20:30	Pellegrini 4' (1:0); Bamert (yellow card) 40'; Dario (yellow card) 45'; Chapuisat (yellow card) 76'; Mauron 78' (2:0); Pellegrini 79' (3:0); Bamert 88' (4:0)	FCB summary	(red card) 24' Andermatt	Attendance: 5,000; Referee: (Switzerland) Kurt Röthlisberger Suhr

30 October 1983 Round 12	Basel	0–0	Grasshopper Club	St. Jakob Stadium, Basel
14:30	Egli (yellow card); Koller (yellow card)	FCB summary	(yellow card) Sutter; (yellow card) Geisser	Attendance: 9,000; Referee: (Switzerland) Ulrich Nyffenegger (Nidau)
Note: Corners: 8:5

13 November 1983 Round 13	Sion	5–3	Basel	Stade Tourbillon, Sion
14:30	Bregy 10' (1:0); Yerli 18' (2:0); Ben Brahim 27' (3:0); Tachet 49' (4:1); Yerli 51' (5:1)	FCB summary	34' (3:1) Maissen; (yellow card) 65' Maradan; 84' (5:2) Hauser; 84' (5:3) Hauser	Attendance: 7,500; Referee: (Switzerland) Rudolf Affolter
Note: Corners: 3:1. Flawless refereeing performance.

20 November 1983 Round 14	Basel	0–2	Wettingen	St. Jakob Stadium, Basel
14:30	Dreher (yellow card) 51'	FCB summary	47' (0:1) Zanetti; (yellow card) 51' Schneider; 56' (0:2) Fregno	Attendance: 3,500; Referee: (Switzerland) Walter Nussbaumer (Crans-près-Céligny)
Note: Corners: 16:4

26 November 1983 Round 15	La Chaux-de-Fonds	2–2	Basel	Stade Charrière, La Chaux-de-Fonds
16:30	GianfredaCarlo Gianfreda	FCB summary	4' (0:1) Sutter; 76' (2:2) Andermatt; (yellow card) Sutter	Attendance: 2,600; Referee: (Switzerland) Arturo Martino (Neukirch an der Thur)

26 February 1984 Round 16	Basel	0–1	La Chaux-de-Fonds	St. Jakob Stadium, Basel
14:30	Uwe Dreher (penalty missed) 9′ Süss (yellow card) 23'	FCB summary	79' (0:1) Baur	Attendance: 4,000; Referee: (Switzerland) Jakob Baumann (Schaffhausen)
Note: Basel played without the injured Botteron and Zbinden, as well as substitute goalkeeper Suter. 9th minute: LCdF goalkeeper Roger Läubli saved Uwe Dreher's penalty.

3 March 1984 Round 17	Wettingen	P – P	Basel	Stadion Altenburg, Wettingen
		[ Summary]

11 March 1984 Round 18	Basel	1–1	Sion	St. Jakob Stadium, Basel
14:30	Geisser (yellow card) 17'; Jeitziner 44' (1:1); Lüthi (yellow card) 51'; Nadig (yellow card) 78'	FCB summary	8' (0:1) Tachet; (yellow card) 83' J. Valentini	Attendance: 4,000; Referee: (Switzerland) Manfred Schlup, (Grenchen)
Note: Basel without Botteron, Zinden, Dreher, Müller (injured), Maradan, von Wartburg, Stohler (reserves). Sion without Karlen, P. Valentini, Rössli (injured). 76th minute: Goal by Yerli disallowed. Yerli left the field after a collision with Suter and had to be taken to hospital with an knee injury. Corners: 2:6.

14 March 1984 Round 17	Wettingen	0–0	Basel	Stadion Altenburg, Wettingen
20:00		FCB summary		Attendance: 3,300; Referee: (Switzerland) Gottlieb Barmettler (Luzern)
Note: Wettingen played without the injured Frei and Peterhans, Basel without the injured Müller, Dreher and Botteron.

18 March 1984 Round 19	Grasshopper Club	4–1	Basel	Hardturm, Zürich
14:30	In-Albon 9' (1:0); Jara 28' (2:0); Schällibaum (yellow card) 67'; Jara (yellow card) 75'; Ponte 77' (3:1); Egli 85' (4:1)	FCB summary	71' (2:1) Andermatt	Attendance: 6,200; Referee: (Switzerland) Franz Gächter (Aarau, Suhr, Aargau)
Note: First NLA appearances for goalkeepers Paul and Felix Rudin. Corners: 6:8.

24 March 1984 Round 20	Basel	1–0	Lausanne-Sport	St. Jakob Stadium, Basel
20:00	Jeitziner 26' (1:0); Süss (yellow card)	FCB summary		Attendance: 2,800; Referee: (Switzerland) Georges Sandoz (Corcelles-Cormondrèche, Neuchâtel)
Note: Torrential rain throughout the entire match. Corners: 8:4.

4 April 1984 Round 21	Servette	3–1	Basel	Charmilles Stadium, Geneva
20:00	Brigger 11' (1:0); Barberis 26' (2:0); Geiger 77' (3:1)	FCB summary	48' (2:1) Sutter; (yellow card) 78' Maissen	Attendance: 4,200; Referee: (Switzerland) Rudolf Affolter

7 April 1984 Round 22	Basel	0–0	Aarau	St. Jakob Stadium, Basel
20:00		FCB summary FCA summary	(yellow card) 56' Seiler; (yellow card) 78' Kaltaveridis	Attendance: 3,300; Referee: (Switzerland) Jakob Baumann (Schaffhausen)
Note: Corners: 16:4

14 April 1984 Round 23	Chiasso	1–3	Basel	Stadio Comunale Riva IV, Chiasso
20:30	Mastrodonato (yellow card) 19'; Stephani (yellow card) 64'; Werner 74' (pen. 1:3)	FCB summary	40' (0:1) Jeitziner; 43' (0:2) Maissen; 69' (0:3) Andermatt; (red card) 72' Dreher	Attendance: 1,300; Referee: (Switzerland) Werner Liebi (Thun)
Note: Chiasso played with only ten players from the 65th minute, following an injury to Kalbermatter, that forced him out of play.

28 April 1984 Round 24	Basel	3–0	Zürich	St. Jakob Stadium, Basel
20:00	Sutter 3' (1:0); Zbinden 5' (2:0); Nadig 22' (3:0)	FCB summary FCZ summary	(yellow card) 65' Kundert	Attendance: 7,000; Referee: (Switzerland) Bruno Galler (Kirchdorf, Bern)
Note: Corners: 2:11. Beat Sutter was forced to leave the game in the 12th minute after a collision with Grob/Stoll, suffering a shoulder injury.

4 May 1984 Round 25	Vevey-Sports	2–2	Basel	Stade de Copet, Vevey
20:00	Siwek 28' (1:0); Debonnaire 35' (2:0); Gavillet (yellow card) 86'	FCB summary	70' (2:1) Zbinden; 86' (2:2) Zbinden	Attendance: 2,100; Referee: (Switzerland) Kurt Röthlisberger (Suhr, Aargau)

12 May 1984 Round 26	Basel	4–2	Xamax	St. Jakob Stadium, Basel
20:00	Hauser 4' (1:0); Hauser 31' (2:0); Nadig 43' (3:0); Nadig 69' (4:1)	FCB summary	45' (3:1) Zaugg; 90' (4:2) Givens	Attendance: 5,500; Referee: (Switzerland) Philippe Mercier (Pully)
Note: Basel ohne Dreher (gesperrt), Maissen, Sutter und Botteron (alle verletzt).

15 May 1984 Round 27	Young Boys	2–0	Basel	Wankdorf Stadium, Bern
20:00	Radi (penalty missed) 6′ Mezger 9' (1:0); Signer 62' (2:0)	FCB summary		Attendance: 2,700; Referee: (Switzerland) Georges Sandoz (Corcelles-Cormondrèche, Neuchâtel)
Note: 6th minute: FCB goalkeeper Urs Suter saves Youssef Radi's penalty.

19 May 1984 Round 28	Basel	4–2	St. Gallen	St. Jakob Stadium, Basel
20:00	Lüthi 7' (1:0); Andermatt 12' (2:0); Jeitziner 23' (3:0); Hauser 57' (4:1)	FCB summary	44' (3:1) Urban; 74' (4:2) Gisinger	Attendance: 7,500; Referee: (Switzerland) Willy Hänni, (Cugy)
Note: Basel were without the injured Botteron, Sutter, Maissen, and Dreher; St. Gallen fielded their full squad. No cautions were issued, fair game. Another goal by Jeitziner was disallowed fractions of a second after the halftime whistle. Corners: 9-10.

2 June 1984 Round 29	Luzern	4–1	Basel	Stadion Allmend, Luzern
20:00	Fairclough 8' (1:0); Kaufmann 33' (2:0); H. Risi 61' (3:1); Tanner 67' (4:1)	FCB summary	49' (2:1) Zbinden	Attendance: 4,200; Referee: (Switzerland) Bruno Galler (Kirchdorf, Bern)
Note: Luzern without René Müller, Basel without Dreher, Botteron and Sutter (all injured). No cautions. Good performance by the referee. Corners: 8:3.

6 June 1984 Round 30	Basel	5–1	Bellinzona	St. Jakob Stadium, Basel
20:00	Hauser 8' (1:0); Maissen 27' (2:0); Jeitziner 33' (3:0); Maissen 62' (4:1); Hauser 87' (5:1)	FCB summary	36' (pen. 3:1) Hafner	Attendance: 2,000; Referee: (Switzerland) Ulrich Nyffenegger (Nidau)
Note: Basel without Dreher, Sutter, and Botteron. Hauser's goal in the 67th minute was disallowed for inexplicable reasons.

==== League table ====
Pos	Team	Pld	W	D	L	GF	GA	GD	Pts	Qualification
1	Grasshopper Club	30	19	6	5	59	32	+27	44	Championship play-off winners, qualified for 1984–85 European Cup
2	Servette	30	19	6	5	67	31	+36	44	Championship play-off loosers Swiss Cup winners, qualified for 1984–85 Cup Winners' Cup
3	Sion	30	18	7	5	74	39	+35	43	qualified for 1984–85 UEFA Cup
4	Xamax	30	15	10	5	54	27	+27	40	qualified for 1984–85 UEFA Cup
5	St. Gallen	30	16	8	6	57	41	+16	40	entered 1984 Intertoto Cup
6	Lausanne-Sport	30	13	8	9	49	37	+12	34	
7	La Chaux-de-Fonds	30	12	9	9	52	47	+5	33	
8	Wettingen	30	12	6	12	43	43	0	30	entered 1984 Intertoto Cup
9	Basel	30	11	6	13	55	59	−4	28	
10	Aarau	30	9	9	12	50	42	+8	27	
11	Young Boys	30	8	9	13	39	40	−1	25	
12	Zürich	30	8	8	14	39	56	−17	24	entered 1984 Intertoto Cup
13	Vevey-Sports	30	9	6	15	43	65	−22	24	
14	Luzern	30	9	4	17	35	52	−17	22	entered 1984 Intertoto Cup
15	Bellinzona	30	4	4	22	30	79	−49	12	Relegated to 1984–85 Nationalliga B
16	Chiasso	30	4	2	24	26	82	−56	10	Relegated to 1984–85 Nationalliga B

Source: rsssf.com
Rules for classification: 1) Points; 2) Goal difference within the league, but decider play-off for qualifiers;

==== Championship play-off ====
15 June 1984
Play-off

Grasshopper Club	1–0 (a.e.t.)	Servette
Egli 109' (pen.)	RSSSF summary

Wankdorf Stadium, Bern
Attendance: 30,000
Referee: (Switzerland) André Daina Eclépens

=== Swiss Cup ===
10 September 1983 Round 3	FC Birsfelden	0–8	Basel	Sportplatz Sternenfeld, Birsfelden
20:00		FCB summary	12' (0:1) Dreher; 13' (0:2) Jeitziner; 15' (0:3) Maissen; 30' (0:4) Jeitziner; 37' (0:5) Jeitziner; 54' (0:6) Sutter; 70' (0:7) Sutter; 80' (0:8) Jeitziner	Attendance: 1,600; Referee: (Switzerland) Rolf Blattmann (Zeiningen)
Note: Corners 4:13.

16 October 1983 Round 4	Basel	0–3	Luzern	St. Jakob Stadium, Basel
16:00		FCB summary	(yellow card) 6' Müller; (yellow card) 37' Martinelli; 51' Fairclough; 74' Fairclough; 75' Fairclough; (yellow card) 77' Kaufmann	Attendance: 6,000; Referee: (Germany) Hans-Peter Dellwing (Trier)
Note: FCB had to manage with ten players from the 70th minute and even just nine from the 86th minute onwards, after first Geisser had to leave the field prematurely due to a muscle strain and then Stohler with a suspected broken arm, and neither could be replaced. A minute's silence was observed in advance of the game for Federal Councillor Willi Ritschard.

== See also ==
- History of FC Basel
- List of FC Basel players
- List of FC Basel seasons

== Sources ==
- Rotblau: Jahrbuch Saison 2015/2016. Publisher: FC Basel Marketing AG. ISBN 978-3-7245-2050-4* Die ersten 125 Jahre. Publisher: Josef Zindel im Friedrich Reinhardt Verlag, Basel. ISBN 978-3-7245-2305-5
- Die ersten 125 Jahre. Publisher: Josef Zindel im Friedrich Reinhardt Verlag, Basel. ISBN 978-3-7245-2305-5
- FCB squad 1983–84 at fcb-archiv.ch
- Switzerland 1983–84 at RSSSF
