= 1982–83 FC Basel season =

FC Basel
1982–83 season
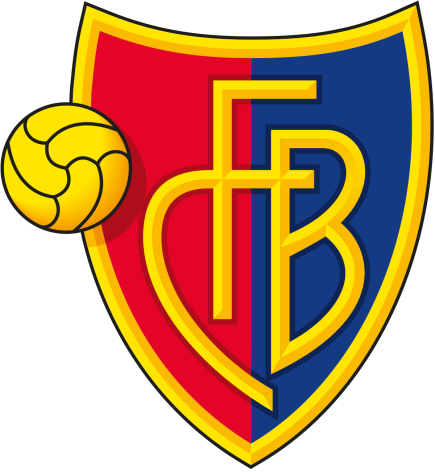
- Chairman: Roland Rasi
- Manager: Rainer Ohlhauser
- Ground: St. Jakob Stadium, Basel
- Nationalliga A: 11th of 16
- Swiss Cup: Round 5
- Coppa delle Alpi: Group stage
- Top goalscorer: League: Martin Jeitziner (7); Beat Sutter (7); Jörg Stohler (7); All: Beat Sutter (9); Jörg Stohler (9)
- Highest home attendance: 11,500 on 11 September 1982 vs Grasshopper Club
- Lowest home attendance: 1,800 on 8 June 1983 vs Aarau
- Average home league attendance: 4,466

The Fussball Club Basel 1893 1982–83 season was their 89th season since the club was founded. It was their 37th consecutive season in the top flight of Swiss football after they won promotion during the season 1945–46. They played their home games in the St. Jakob Stadium. Roland Rasi was appointed as the club's chairman at the AGM, he replaced Pierre Jacques Lieblich who stood down.

== Overview ==
=== Pre-season ===
Rainer Ohlhauser was the new first team manager. He had taken over from Helmut Benthaus, who had been manager for 17 years between 1965 and 1982, and who had moved on to take over as manager of VfB Stuttgart. A number of players left the squad, Ernst Schleiffer moved on to Grenchen, Peter Marti went to Aarau, Markus Tanner to Luzern and Joseph Küttel to Lugano. In the other direction Winfried Berkemeier joined from Young Boys, Ruedi Zbinden joined from local rivals Nordstern Basel and Nicolas Keller joined from Chiasso. There were also a number of youngsters who advanced from the youth team, Roger Bossert, Guido Rudin and Thomas Hauser.

Basel played a total of 51 games this season. 30 matches were played in the domestic league, three in the Swiss Cup, four in the Cup of the Alps and 14 were friendly matches. The Swiss League Cup was no longer played this season. The team scored a total of 108 goals and conceded 85. Of their 14 test games, ten were won, two drawn and two ended with a defeat. Only one of these test games were played at home in St. Jakob Stadium, the others were all played away.

=== Domestic league ===
The 1982–83 Nationalliga A was contested by 16 teams, including the top 14 clubs from the previous season and the two sides promoted from the second level 1981–82 Nationalliga B, these being FC Winterthur and FC Wettingen. The league was contested in a double round robin format, with each club playing every other club twice, home and away. Two points were awarded for a win and one point given to each team for a draw. Basel ended the season in eleventh position. In their 30 league games Basel won ten, drew five and lost fifteen matches, obtaining 25 points. They scored 47 goals, conceding 56, they were 24 points behind Grasshopper Club Zürich who became new champions. The new champions were qualified for 1983–84 European Cup. Servette were second in the championship, but as Cup winners they qualified for the 1983–84 Cup Winners' Cup. Therefore, the third and fourth teams, St. Gallen and Zürich, qualified for the 1983–84 UEFA Cup. FC Bulle and FC Winterthur suffered relegation.

=== Swiss Cup ===
Basel entered into the 1982–83 Swiss Cup in round 3. Here they were drawn away against third-tier FC Breitenbach and on 9 October they won the match 4–0. In the fourth round Basel were drawn at home against Lausanne-Sport. The game was played on 12 March 1983 and Basel won 2–1 after extra time. On 4 April the away defeat against second-tier Mendrisiostar meant the end of this cup season. The Swiss League Cup was no longer competed this year.

=== Coppa delle Alpi ===
In the Coppa delle Alpi Basel were drawn against AJ Auxerre and Metz. Two draws against Auxerre and one victory and a defeat against Metz left them in third position in the Swiss teams group table. Xamax and Nantes played in the final.

== Players ==
The following is the list of the Basel first team squad during the season 1982–83. The list includes players that were in the squad on the day that the Nationalliga A season started on 14 August 1982 but subsequently left the club after that date.

Note: Flags indicate national team as defined under FIFA eligibility rules; some limited exceptions apply. Players may hold more than one non-FIFA nationality.

No.	Pos.	Nation	Player
1	GK	SUI	Hans Küng
1	GK	SUI	Thomas Paul
2	DF	SUI	Walter Geisser
3	DF	FRA	Serge Duvernois
4	DF	SUI	Bruno Graf
5	DF	SUI	Jörg Stohler
6	MF	GER	Winfried Berkemeier (from Young Boys)
7	MF	SUI	Martin Jeitziner
8	FW	SUI	Beat Sutter
9	FW	SUI	Stefano Ceccaroni
10	MF	SUI	Arthur von Wartburg
11	FW	SUI	Ruedi Zbinden (from Nordstern Basel)

No.	Pos.	Nation	Player
12	DF	SUI	Jean-Pierre Maradan
13	DF	SUI	Alfred Lüthi
14	FW	SUI	Peter Marti
15	MF	SUI	Roger Bossert (from youth team)
16	MF	SUI	Guido Rudin (from youth team)
17	MF	FRA	Serge Gaisser
18	MF	SUI	Nicolas Keller (from Chiasso)
19	MF	GER	Thomas Hauser (from youth team)
22	GK	SUI	Hans Müller
—	DF	SUI	René Hasler
—	MF	SUI	Cesare Cosenza

Players who left the squad

Note: Flags indicate national team as defined under FIFA eligibility rules; some limited exceptions apply. Players may hold more than one non-FIFA nationality.

No.	Pos.	Nation	Player
—	GK	SUI	Walter Eichenberger (to Young Boys)
—	MF	SUI	Otto Demarmels (retired)
—	MF	SUI	Erni Maissen (to Zürich)

No.	Pos.	Nation	Player
—	FW	GER	Harald Nickel (retired)
—	MF	SUI	Martin Mullis (to Wettingen)
—	MF	SUI	Hansruedi Schär (to Nordstern)
—	MF	SUI	René Zingg (to FC Montreux-Sports)

== Results ==
Legend

Win Draw Loss Postponed

=== Friendly matches ===
==== Pre- and mid-season ====
13 July 1982 Pre-season	FC Mulhouse (France)	3–3	(Switzerland) Basel	Stade Municipal, Huningue
19:45	Ouattara 8' (1:0); Andrey 33' (2:0); Wagner 58' (3:1)	FCB summary	50' (2:1) Jeitziner; 65' (3:2) Ceccaroni; 77' (3:3) Zbinden; (yellow card) Gaisser	Attendance: 1,200; Referee: (France) Seltz

5 August 1981 Uhrencup semi-final	Basel (Switzerland)	6–1	(Switzerland) Biel-Bienne	Stadion Brühl, Grenchen
19:00	Gaisser 8' (1:0); Zbinden 20' (2:0); Berkemeier 22' (3:0); Berkemeier 29' (4:0); Stohler 66' (5:0); Sutter 68' (6:0)	FCB summary	76' (6:1) Campiotti	Attendance: 1,000; Referee: (Switzerland) Hauri
Note: Ihe Uhrencup is a former club football tournament that was held annually in Grenchen in Switzerland. For the last 12 minutes FCB only had 10 men, because the slightly injured Serge Gaisser also left the field.

7 August 1982 Uhrencup final	Grenchen (Switzerland)	2–1	(Switzerland) Basel	Stadion Brühl, Grenchen
19:00	Biljali 47' (1:1); Wenger 60' (2:1)	FCB summary	22' (0:1) Sutter	Attendance: 2,300; Referee: (Switzerland) Werner Liebi (Thun)
Note: The Uhrencup is a former club football tournament that was held annually in Grenchen in Switzerland.

7 September 1982 Mid-season	Etoile Carouge (Switzerland)	2–4	(Switzerland) Basel	Stade de la Fontenette, Carouge
19:30	Goal	FCB summary	(1x) Stohler (1x) Lüthi (1x) Gaisser (1x) Zbinden	Attendance: 400; Referee: (Switzerland) De Toro

30 September 1982 Mid-Season	SV Weil (Germany)	1–3	(Switzerland) Basel	Weil am Rhein
19:00	Goal	FCB summary	(1x) Graf (1x) Ceccaroni (1x) Zbinden

19 October 1982 Mid-season	Basel (Switzerland)	2–0	(Germany) VfB Stuttgart	St. Jakob Stadium, Basel
19:30	Zbinden 43' (1:0); Sutter 50' (2:0)	FCB summary		Attendance: 7,500; Referee: (Switzerland) Franz Gächter (Aarau, Suhr, Aargau)
Note: To cover the costs of the game, 8000 spectators would have been needed.

==== Winter break and mid-season ====
31 January 1983 Winter break	Seoul (South Korea)	2–2	(Switzerland) Basel	Villefranche-sur-Mer
15:00	(1:0) (2:1)	FCB summary	(1:1) Sutter (2:2) Maradan; (penalty missed) 90′ Maradan
Note: Match as Exhibition game during the trainings camp.

1 February 1983 Winter break	Vevey-Sports (Switzerland)	3–1	(Switzerland) Basel	Villefranche-sur-Mer
15:00	(1:0) (2:0) (3:0)	FCB summary	75' (3:1) Marti
Note: Match as Exhibition game during the trainings camp.

8 February 1983 Winter break	FC Allschwil (Switzerland)	2–10	(Switzerland) Basel	Gartenhof, Hartplatz, Allschwil
19:00	Leuthardt 11' (1:3); Storz 14' (2:3)	FCB summary	3' (0:1) Sutter; 4' (0:2) Jeitziner; 7' (0:3) Sutter; 25' (2:4) Lüthi; 48' (2:5) Ceccaroni; 49' (2:6) Ceccaroni; 56' (2:7) von Wartburg; 75' (2:8) Sutter; 80' (2:9) Sutter; 90' (2:10) Berkemeier	Attendance: 100; Referee: (Switzerland) Rolf Blattmann (Zeiningen)

12 February 1983 Winter break	Xamax (Switzerland)	1–2	(Switzerland) Basel	Stade Municipal, Payerne
15:30	Bianchi 47' (1:1)	FCB summary	3' (0:1) Jeitziner; 85' (1:2) Marti	Attendance: 500; Referee: (Switzerland) Willy Hänni, (Cugy)
Note: In the 30th minute, Walter Geisser was struck by the jumping Silvano Bianchi and had to be carried off the pitch with stomach pains. At the hospital, the player underwent a thorough examination, which revealed no serious injury (possibly a bruised rib).

16 February 1983 Winter break	SC Binningen (Switzerland)	0–4	(Switzerland) Basel	Spiegelfeld, Binningen
19:00		FCB summary	31' (0:1) Jeitziner; 50' (0:4) Jeitziner; 60' (0:3) Sutter; 90' (0:4) Jeitziner	Attendance: 150; Referee: (Switzerland) Kurt Fuchs (Basel)

19 February 1983 Winter break	Nordstern Basel (Switzerland)	0–5	(Switzerland) Basel	Stadion Rankhof, Basel
14:30		FCB summary	8' (0:1) Jeitziner; 27' (0:2) Stohler; 48' (0:3) Zbinden; 53' (0:4) Sutter; 74' (0:5) von Wartburg	Attendance: 300; Referee: (Switzerland) Rolf Blattmann (Zeiningen)

30 March 1983 Mid-season	Old Boys (Switzerland)	0–2	(Switzerland) Basel	Stadion Schützenmatte, Basel
19:00		FCB summary	3' (0:1) Geisser; 58' (0:2) Ceccaroni	Referee: (Switzerland) Pfister

3 May 1983 Mid-season	FC Laufen (Switzerland)	0–3	(Switzerland) Basel	Zwingen
18:30		FCB summary	52' (0:1) Ceccaroni; 68' (0:2) Berkemeier; 69' (0:3) Duvernois	Attendance: 1,000; Referee: (Switzerland) Weisskopf

=== Nationalliga A ===
==== League matches ====
14 August 1982 Round 1	Basel	0–1	Young Boys	St. Jakob Stadium, Basel
20:00		FCB summary	78' (0:1) Signer; (yellow card) Feuz	Attendance: 7,500; Referee: (Switzerland) Bruno Galler (Kirchdorf, Bern)

21 August 1982 Round 2	Aarau	1–2	Basel	Stadion Brügglifeld, Aarau
20:00	Müller 11' (1:0); Tschupperet (yellow card) 66'	FCB summary FCA summary	48' (1:1) Sutter; (yellow card) 57' Stohler; 72' (1:2) Marti; (yellow card) 83' Berkemeier	Attendance: 6,500; Referee: (Switzerland) Marco Raveglia (San Vittore)

25 August 1982 Round 3	Servette	2–0	Basel	Charmilles Stadium, Geneva
20:30	Brigger 42' (1:0); Elia 85' (2:0)	FCB summary		Attendance: 8,000; Referee: (Switzerland) André Daina (Éclépens)
Note: The bumpy terrain, partly covered with sand and earth, made ball control very difficult.

28 August 1982 Round 4	Basel	5–1	Vevey-Sports	St. Jakob Stadium, Basel
20:00	Marti 28' (1:0); Stohler 54' (pen. 2:0); Marti 72' (3:1); Jeitziner 75' (4:1); Berkemeier (yellow card) 82'; Zbinden 88' (5:1)	FCB summary	(yellow card) 53' Debonnaire; (yellow card) 53' Franz; 55' (2:1) Siwek	Attendance: 3,400; Referee: (Switzerland) Kurt Röthlisberger Suhr

4 September 1982 Round 5	Bellinzona	0–3	Basel	Stadio Comunale, Bellinzona
20:30	Hafner (yellow card) 50'	FCB summary	21' (pen. 0:1) Stohler; (yellow card) 30' Berkemeier; 39' (0:2) Lüthi; (yellow card) 51' Maradan; 72' (0:3) Sutter	Attendance: 4,000; Referee: (Switzerland) Charles-Henri Morex (Bex)

11 September 1982 Round 6	Basel	3–1	Grasshopper Club	St. Jakob Stadium, Basel
20:00	Maradan 27' (1:0); Lüthi 34' (2:0); Gaisser 86' (3:1)	FCB summary	66' (2:1) Ladner	Attendance: 11,500; Referee: (Switzerland) Georges Sandoz (Corcelles-Cormondrèche, Neuchâtel)

18 September 1982 Round 7	Xamax	3–2	Basel	Stade de la Maladière (1924), Neuchâtel
20:15	Sarrasin 10' (1:0); Trinchero (penalty missed) 11′ Zaugg 53' (2:0); Gianfreda 79' (3:2)	FCB summary	66' (2:1) Berkemeier; 72' (2:2) Jeitziner	Attendance: 10,500; Referee: (Switzerland) Jean-Marie Macheret, (Rueyres-St-Laurent)

25 September 1982 Round 8	Basel	1–0	Winterthur	St. Jakob Stadium, Basel
20:00	Jeitziner 17' (1:0)	FCB summary		Attendance: 4,500; Referee: (Switzerland) Arturo Martino (Neukirch an der Thur)

9 October 1982 Round 9	St. Gallen	2–0	Basel	Espenmoos, St. Gallen
17:30	Gisinger 40' (1:0); Braschler 90' (2:0)	FCB summary		Attendance: 10,000; Referee: (Switzerland) André Daina (Éclépens)

23 October 1982 Round 10	Basel	2–2	Sion	St. Jakob Stadium, Basel
20:00	Sutter 17' (1:1); Zbinden 60' (2:1)	FCB summary	11' (0:1) Bregy; 69' (2:2) Balet	Attendance: 2,000; Referee: (Switzerland) Jakob Baumann (Schaffhausen)

31 October 1982 Round 11	Basel	1–0	Lausanne-Sport	St. Jakob Stadium, Basel
14:30	Gaisser 86' (1:0)	FCB summary		Attendance: 4,500; Referee: (Switzerland) Willy Hänni, (Cugy)
Note: 70th minute: Match interrupted due to numerous fireworks from the FCB fan section; referee threatened to abandon the match.

7 November 1982 Round 12	Wettingen	1–0	Basel	Stadion Altenburg, Wettingen
14:30	Radakovic (yellow card) 29'; Zanchi (yellow card) 63'; Andermatt 72' (1:0)	FCB summary	(yellow card) 28' Jeitziner; (red card) Maradan	Attendance: 5,500; Referee: (Switzerland) Daniel Bürki

10 November 1982 Round 13	Basel	1–1	Zürich	St. Jakob Stadium, Basel
20:00	Jeitziner 13' (1:0); Zbinden (yellow card) 31'; Maissen (yellow card) 43'	FCZ summary FCB summary	33' (1:1) Landolt; (yellow card) 88' Lüdi	Attendance: 7,000; Referee: (Switzerland) Ulrich Nyffenegger
Note: On the cover of the match program for the championship game between FCB and FCZ on 10 November 1982, prominently featured the following announcement from Martin Jeitziner: "If we don't win, I will be giving away Züri-Tirggel (Zurich Tirggel cookies) on Thursday at 3 p.m. in Zürcherstrasse." Jeitziner does his best to prevent this "disgrace" and scored the opening goal very early on. However, Landolt managed to equalize before halftime, and so the next day Jeitziner stood in the Zürcherstrasse in Basel, giving away Züri-Tirggel cookies.

21 November 1982 Round 14	Luzern	4–3	Basel	Stadion Allmend, Luzern
14:30	P. Risi 10' (pen. 1:0); P. Risi 22' (2:0); Lauscher 48' (3:1); P. Risi 72' (pen. 4:3)	FCB summary	30' (2:1) Stohler; 57' (3:2) Berkemeier; 70' (3:3) Cosenza	Attendance: 12,700; Referee: (Switzerland) Vito De Toro
Note: Soft ground, ideal football weather, great atmosphere.

27 November 1982 Round 15	Basel	3–1	Bulle	St. Jakob Stadium, Basel
15:30	Zbinden 3' (1:0); Jeitziner 48' (2:0); Jeitziner 84' (3:1)	FCB summary	(yellow card) 41' Golay; 51' (2:1) Blanchard	Attendance: 2,000; Referee: (Switzerland) Jakob Schönenberger
Note: The entire match was played under floodlights (despite kick-off time)! Before the match, Hans Küng was honored for his 150th league appearance with FCB. Minute of mourning (and mourning bands worn by the FCB players) for the late Franz Rinderer (former chairman of the FC Basel).

27 February 1983 Round 16	Bulle	2–1	Basel	Stade de Bouleyres, Bulle
14:30	Bapst (yellow card) 22'; Mora (yellow card) 32'; Mora 45' (1:1); Saunier 65' (2:1)	FCB summary	8' (pen. 0:1) Stohler	Attendance: 1,500; Referee: (Switzerland) Bruno Galler (Kirchdorf, Bern)
Note: Very deep ground

3 March 1983 Round 17	Basel	3–0	Luzern	St. Jakob Stadium, Basel
14:30	Stohler (penalty missed) 20′ Sutter 29' (1:0); Marti 44' (2:0); Sutter 48' (3:0)	FCB summary		Attendance: 5,500; Referee: (Switzerland) Walter Nussbaumer (Crans-près-Céligny)
Note: 20th minute FCL goalkeeper Gody Waser saved Jörg Stohler's penalty. Corners 4:18. Good referee.

20 March 1983 Round 18	Zürich	4–3	Basel	Letzigrund, Zürich
14:30	Jerković 11' (pen. 1:0); Rufer 31' (2:0); Seiler 35' (3:0); Iselin (yellow card) 42'; Jerković 55' (pen. 4:1)	FCZ summary FCB summary	48' (pen. 3:1) Stohler; (yellow card) 69' Jeitziner; 74' (4:2) Gaisser; 75' (4:3) Sutter	Attendance: 9,200; Referee: (Switzerland) Kurt Röthlisberger (Suhr, Aargau)
Note: Following this match FCZ and their head coach Daniel Jeandupeux parted ways.

23 March 1983 Round 19	Basel	1–0	Wettingen	St. Jakob Stadium, Basel
20:00	Stohler 75' (pen. 1:0)	FCB summary		Attendance: 2,500; Referee: (Switzerland) Claude Gachoud
Note: von Wartburg's 250th championship game for FC Basel.

9 April 1983 Round 20	Lausanne-Sport	7–0	Basel	Olympique de la Pontaise, Lausanne
20:30	Lei-Ravello 15' (1:0); Gaisser 28' (o.g. 2:0); Kok 45+1' (3:0); Kok 49' (4:0); Mauron 50' (5:0); Pellegrini 51' (6:0); Diserens 85' (pen. 7:0)	FCB summary		Attendance: 5,500; Referee: (Switzerland) Renzo Peduzzi (Roveredo)
Note: Corners: 11:5. 69th minute, a goal by Peter Marti, following a cross from Beat Sutter, was not given (goalkeeper Jean-Claude Milani clearly held the ball behind the goal line, but the linesman signaled play on).

16 April 1983 Round 21	Sion	1–0	Basel	Stade Tourbillon, Sion
18:15	Balet 36' (1:0)	FCB summary	(yellow card) 16' Ceccaroni; (yellow card) 22' Zbinden; (penalty missed) 51′ Stohler; (yellow card) 77' Sutter	Attendance: 4,000; Referee: (Switzerland) Robert Süess

23 April 1983 Round 22	Basel	2–2	St. Gallen	St. Jakob Stadium, Basel
20:00	Hauser 13' (1:1); Stohler 56' (2:1)	FCB summary	6' (0:1) Braschler; 81' (2:2) Gisinger; (yellow card) Gorgon	Attendance: 4,000; Referee: (Switzerland) Willi Jaus (Feldmeilen)
Note: Corners: 3:15. League debut von Thomas Hauser.

30 April 1983 Round 23	Winterthur	1–1	Basel	Schützenwiese, Winterthur
20:00	Roth 58' (1:0)	FCB summary	60' (1:1) Hauser; (yellow card) 65' Keller	Attendance: 1,900; Referee: (Switzerland) Georges Sandoz (Corcelles-Cormondrèche, Neuchâtel)

7 May 1983 Round 24	Basel	0–4	Xamax	St. Jakob Stadium, Basel
20:00		FCB summary	28' (0:1) Mottiez; (yellow card) 61' Perret; 63' (0:2) Lüthi; 67' (0:3) Lüthi; 78' (0:4) Lüthi	Attendance: 3,800; Referee: (Germany) Manfred Neuner Leimen

19 May 1983 Round 25	Grasshopper Club	1–0	Basel	Hardturm, Zürich
20:00	Egli 44' (1:0)	FCB summary	(yellow card) 41' Lüthi	Attendance: 4,700; Referee: (Switzerland) Werner Liebi (Thun)

28 May 1983 Round 26	Basel	2–3	Bellinzona	St. Jakob Stadium, Basel
20:00	Marti 38' (1:2); Hauser 73' (2:3)	FCB summary	17' (0:1) Kurz; 33' (0:2) Kundert; 64' (1:3) Kurz; (yellow card) 74' Schär; (yellow card) 85' Tedeschi; (yellow card) 90' Viel	Attendance: 2,000; Referee: (Switzerland) Peter Hauser

1 June 1983 Round 27	Vevey-Sports	3–3	Basel	Stade de Copet, Vevey
19:00	Franz 11' (1:1); Franz 68' (pen. 2:2); Franz 81' (3:2)	FCB summary	2' (0:1) Zbinden; 54' (1:2) Marti; 86' (3:3) Gaisser	Attendance: 1,800; Referee: (Switzerland) Bruno Burgener (Kriens)
Note: Last game for Bruno Burgener as referee.

4 June 1983 Round 28	Basel	1–3	Servette	St. Jakob Stadium, Basel
20:00	Gaisser (yellow card) 13'; Gaisser 33' (1:1)	FCB summary	(yellow card) 22' Cacciapaglia; 23' (0:1) Brigger; 51' (1:2) Favre; (yellow card) 56' Geiger; 69' (1:3) Favre	Attendance: 5,000; Referee: (Switzerland) Ulrich Nyffenegger (Nidau)

8 June 1983 Round 29	Basel	2–1	Aarau	St. Jakob Stadium, Basel
20:00	Jeitziner 30' (1:0); Maradan 48' (pen. 2:0)	FCB summary FCA summary	73' (2:1) Herberth	Attendance: 1,800; Referee: (Switzerland) Arturo Martino (Neukirch an der Thur)
Note: Jörg Stohler honored for his 299th league championship game. Goalkeeper Hans Küng honored for his retirement.

11 June 1983 Round 30	Young Boys	4–2	Basel	Wankdorf Stadium, Bern
20:00	Jacobacci 32' (1:0); Schmidlin 40' (2:1); Peterhans 61' (3:1); Peterhans 63' (4:1)	FCB summary	34' (1:1) Lüthi; (yellow card) 75' Stohler; 84' (4:2) Sutter	Attendance: 2,000; Referee: (Switzerland) Francesco Bianchi (Chiasso)

==== Final league table ====
Pos	Team	Pld	W	D	L	GF	GA	GD	Pts	Qualification
1	Grasshopper Club	30	24	1	5	86	29	+57	49	Swiss champions, qualified for 1983–84 European Cup
2	Servette	30	22	4	4	65	24	+41	48	Swiss Cup finalist, qualified for 1983–84 Cup Winners' Cup
3	St. Gallen	30	17	6	7	61	31	+30	40	qualified for 1983–84 UEFA Cup and entered 1983 Intertoto Cup
4	Zürich	30	17	4	9	55	39	+16	38	qualified for 1983–84 UEFA Cup and entered 1983 Intertoto Cup
5	Lausanne-Sport	30	15	7	8	51	28	+23	37	
6	Xamax	30	15	7	8	61	40	+21	37	
7	Sion	30	12	11	7	51	36	+15	35	
8	Luzern	30	14	3	13	57	56	+1	31	entered 1983 Intertoto Cup
9	Young Boys	30	11	8	11	35	42	−7	30	entered 1983 Intertoto Cup
10	Wettingen	30	8	9	13	40	47	−7	25	
11	Basel	30	10	5	15	47	56	−9	25	
12	Vevey	30	9	4	17	42	61	−19	22	
13	Bellinzona	30	8	5	17	36	74	−38	21	
14	Aarau	30	8	4	18	32	52	−20	20	
15	Bulle	30	4	4	22	27	87	−60	12	Relegated to 1983–84 Nationalliga B
16	Winterthur	30	2	6	22	30	74	−44	10	Relegated to 1983–84 Nationalliga B

Source: rsssf.com
Rules for classification: 1) Points; 2) Goal difference within the league, but decider play-off for qualifiers;

=== Swiss Cup ===
17 October 1982 Round 3	FC Breitenbach	0–4	Basel	Bodenacker, Breitenbach
14:30	R. Hänggi (yellow card)	FCB summary	13' (0:1) Berkemeier; 26' (0:2) Zbinden; 71' (0:3) Sutter; 87' (0:2) Berkemeier; (yellow card) Maradan; (yellow card) Graf	Attendance: 2,800; Referee: (Switzerland) Rolf Blattmann (Zeiningen)
Note: Breitenbach played the 1982–83 season in the 1. Liga (third-tier).

13 March 1983 Round 4	Basel	2–1 (a.e.t.)	Lausanne-Sport	St. Jakob Stadium, Basel
14:30	Berkemeier (yellow card) 25'; Sutter 81' (1:1); Stohler 117' (2:1)	FCB summary	(penalty missed) 42′ Pellegrini; (yellow card) 49' Lei-Ravello; 63' (0:1) Ryf	Attendance: 7,300; Referee: (Switzerland) Jakob Baumann (Schaffhausen)
Note: 42nd minute: Basel's goalkeeper Hans Küng saved the penalty from Walter Pellegrini.

4 April 1983 Round 5	Mendrisiostar	2–1	Basel	Centro Sportivo Comunale, Mendrisio
14:30	Mohorovic 10' (1:0); Ambroggi (yellow card) 34'; Mohorovic 74' (2:1); Vavassori (yellow card) 76'	FCB summary	21' (1:1) Stohler; (yellow card) 75' Maradan	Referee: (Switzerland) Peter Hauser
Note: Mendrisiostar played the 1982–83 season in the Nationalliga B (second-tier).

=== Coppa delle Alpi ===
Group A

17 July 1982 Round 1	Basel (Switzerland)	0–0	(France) AJ Auxerre	St. Jakob Stadium Basel
20:00		FCB summary		Attendance: 1,200; Referee: (France) Jean-Marie Lartigot

24 July 1982 Round 2	AJ Auxerre (France)	2–2	(Switzerland) Basel	Stade de l'Aube, Troyes
20:30	Ferreri 78' (1:2); Szarmach 85' (2:2)	FCB summary	63' (1:0) Gaisser; 65' (0:2) Ceccaroni	Attendance: 2,500; Referee: (Switzerland) Werner Liebi

27 July 1982 Round 3	Basel (Switzerland)	3–2	(France) Metz	St. Jakob Stadium Basel
20:00	Zbinden 17' (1:0); Zbinden 32' (2:0); Stohler 58' (pen. 3:1)	FCB summary	(yellow card) 38' Zdun; 42' (2:1) Bernad; 79' (3:2) Morgante	Attendance: 1,000; Referee: (France) Joël Quiniou

31 July 1982 Round 4	Metz (France)	5–1	(Switzerland) Basel	Stade Saint-Symphorien, Metz
20:30	Morgante 6' (1:0); Loiseau 42' (2:1); Kurbos 55' (3:1); Kurbos 61' (4:1); Sonor 81' (5:1)	FCB summary	31' (1:1) Sutter	Attendance: 2,841; Referee: (Switzerland) Roland Chapuis

Swiss teams group table
Pos	Team	Pld	W	D	L	GF	GA	GD	Pts
1	Xamax	4	3	0	1	11	6	+5	6
2	Servette	4	2	2	0	5	2	+3	6
3	Basel	4	1	2	1	6	9	−3	4
4	Grasshopper Club	4	0	3	1	4	5	−1	3
5	Sion	4	1	0	3	5	9	−4	2

NB: teams played two teams of the other country home and away

== See also ==
- History of FC Basel
- List of FC Basel players
- List of FC Basel seasons

== Sources ==
- Rotblau: Jahrbuch Saison 2015/2016. Publisher: FC Basel Marketing AG. ISBN 978-3-7245-2050-4
- Switzerland 1982–83 at RSSSF
- Cup of the Alps 1982 at RSSSF
