= Peter Nadig =

Swiss footballer (born 1965)

Personal information
- Full name: Peter Nadig
- Date of birth: 20 February 1965 (age 61)
- Place of birth: Basel, Switzerland
- Height: 1.90 m (6 ft 3 in)
- Positions: Midfielder; forward

Youth career
- until 1983: Basel

Senior career*
Years	Team	Apps	(Gls)
1983–1988	Basel	123	(41)
1988–1995	Luzern	183	(54)
- * Club domestic league appearances and goals

Peter Nadig (born 20 February 1965) is a former Swiss footballer who played in the 1980s and 1990s as midfielder or as striker.

== Career ==
Nadig played his youth football with local team Basel. He advanced to their first team for their 1983–84 season and signed his first professional contract under manager Ernst-August Künnecke. After playing in 12 test games, Nadig played his domestic league debut for the club in the home game in the St. Jakob Stadium on 11 March 1984 as Basel played a 1–1 draw with Sion. He collected his first yellow card in the same game. He scored his first goal for his club in the home game on 28 April and it was the last goal of the game in the 22nd minute as Basel won 3–0 against Zürich.

Nadig played five season with the club and received a call up to the Swiss national team. But with Basel, apart from three titles in the Uhrencup, he had no big successes. In their 1987–88 season his teammates included goalie Urs Suter, the defenders Peter Bernauer and Massimo Ceccaroni, the Scott Gordon Duffield Smith and two other Swiss national team players Adrian Knup and Dominique Herr. Despite this personally strongly occupied team Basel were relegated to the Nationalliga B after the 1987–88 Nationalliga A season.

Following the relegation he left the team. Between the years 1983 and 1988 Nadig played a total of 197 games for Basel scoring a total of 78 goals. 123 of these games were in the Nationalliga A, nine in the Swiss Cup and 65 were friendly games. He scored 41 goals in the domestic league, six in the cup and the other31 were scored during the test games.

Nadig transferred to Luzern where he played for seven years. He won the championship with Luzern in the 1988–89 season and the Swiss Cup in 1991–92 as Luzern won 3–1 after extra time. Nadig achieved his greatest personal success in 1989 as he was voted Swiss Footballer of the Year.

== Honours ==
Basel

- Uhren Cup winner: 1983, 1986, 1988

Luzern

- Swiss League champion: 1988-89
- Swiss Cup winner: 1991-92

Individual

- Swiss Footballer of the Year: 1988–89

== Sources ==
- Rotblau: Jahrbuch Saison 2015/2016. Publisher: FC Basel Marketing AG. ISBN 978-3-7245-2050-4
- Die ersten 125 Jahre. Publisher: Josef Zindel im Friedrich Reinhardt Verlag, Basel. ISBN 978-3-7245-2305-5
- Verein "Basler Fussballarchiv" Homepage
