= Urs Suter =

Swiss footballer (born 1959)

Personal information
- Date of birth: 4 March 1959 (age 67)
- Place of birth: Zürich, Switzerland
- Height: 1.83 m (6 ft 0 in)
- Position: Goalkeeper

Youth career
- 1970–1976: FC Langnau am Albis
- 1976–1978: Grasshopper Club Zürich

Senior career*
Years	Team	Apps	(Gls)
1978–1980	Grasshopper Club Zürich		
1980–1982	FC Blue Stars Zürich		
1982–1983	FC Wettingen	29	(0)
1983–1988	FC Basel	138	(0)
1988–1992	FC Zürich	43	(0)
1992–1933	FC Wettingen	22	(0)
1993–1998	FC Tuggen		
1998–	FC Wollishofen		
- * Club domestic league appearances and goals as of 23 November 2009 ‡ National team caps and goals as of 23 November 2009

Urs Suter (born 4 March 1959) is a Swiss former footballer who played as a goalkeeper.

== Football career ==
Suter started his football with the youth teams of the local football club FC Langnau am Albis before moving on to Grasshopper Club Zürich. He played in their youth team and later in their reserve side. During the 1980–81 and 1981–82 seasons he played for FC Blue Stars Zürich in the Swiss 1. Liga.

Urs Suter signed his first professional contract with promoted FC Wettingen in 1981. During his first season he was the reserve goalkeeper and did not come to any playing time, but the team won promotion. In the 1982–83 season Suter became first keeper and played 29 games.

Suter joined FC Basel in their 1983–84 season under head-coach Ernst-August Künnecke. After playing in seven test games Suter played his domestic league debut for the club in the away game on 10 August 1983 as Basel were defeated 2–4 by Bellinzona. With Basel he won the Uhrencup in 1983 and 1986. Suter played in Basel for five seasons, until the team was relegated after a very disappointing 1987–88 season. His team mates included defenders Massimo Ceccaroni and Peter Bernauer and Swiss national team players such as Adrian Knup, Dominique Herr and Peter Nadig. Despite this personally strongly occupied team Basel were relegated to the Nationalliga B after the 1987–88 Nationalliga A season. During this time Suter played a total of 219 games for Basel. 138 of these games were in the Nationalliga A, 14 in the Swiss Cup and 67 were friendly games.

At that point he transferred to FC Zürich and played there for four years. During the season 1989–90 Suter won promotion with Zürich to the Nationalliga A.

In the 1992–93 season, Suter again played for FC Wettingen, but at the end of the season the club was dissolved due to financial reasons. So Suter moved, as semi-professional, to FC Tuggen in the 1. Liga. The team won the Group championship and were promoted to the Challenge League (then named Nationalliga B). However, a year later the team was placed last in the division and were relegated. Again a year later they were 1. Liga Group winners, but failed in the play-off promotion game with 0:2 against FC Thun. Suter played in Tuggen five years and retired in 1998, concluding his football career with FC Wollishofen in the lower divisions.

== Honours ==
Basel

- Uhrencup Winner: 1983, 1986

Zürich

- Promotion to Nationalliga A: 1989–90

Tuggen

- Group Champions Swiss 1. Liga and Promotion to Nationalliga B: 1993–94
- Group Champions 1. Liga: 1995–96

== Personal Information ==
Urs Suter is married to Jacqueline. They have two daughters Kerstin und Senja. Today Suter lives in Zürich and works as a sales representative for an electric lighting company.

== Sources ==
- Die ersten 125 Jahre. Publisher: Josef Zindel im Friedrich Reinhardt Verlag, Basel. ISBN 978-3-7245-2305-5
- Verein "Basler Fussballarchiv" Homepage
- Urs Suter at WorldFootball.net
