= Felix Rudin =

Swiss footballer (born 1965)

Personal information
- Full name: Felix Rudin
- Date of birth: 27 September 1965 (age 61)
- Place of birth: Switzerland
- Positions: Defender; midfielder

Senior career*
Years	Team	Apps	(Gls)
1983–1986	FC Basel	5	(0)
- * Club domestic league appearances and goals

Felix Rudin (born 27 September 1965) is a former Swiss footballer who played in the 1980s. He played mainly in the position as defender, but also as midfielder.

Rudin played his youth football by FC Basel and joined their first team in their 1983–84 season under team manager Ernst August Künnecke. Rudin played his domestic league debut for the club in the away game on 18 March 1984 as Basel lost 1–4 against Grasshopper Club.

Rudin stayed with the club's first team for at least three seasons and during this time he played a total of 11 games for Basel without scoring a goal. Five of these games were in the Nationalliga A and six were friendly games.

== Sources ==
- Die ersten 125 Jahre. Publisher: Josef Zindel im Friedrich Reinhardt Verlag, Basel. ISBN 978-3-7245-2305-5
- Verein "Basler Fussballarchiv" Homepage
