= Uwe Dreher =

German footballer (1960–2016)

Personal information
- Date of birth: 13 May 1960
- Place of birth: Tübingen, West Germany
- Date of death: 20 October 2016 (aged 56)
- Place of death: Tübingen, Germany
- Height: 1.75 m (5 ft 9 in)
- Position: Striker

Youth career
- –1978: SV 03 Tübingen

Senior career*
| Years | Team | Apps | (Gls) |
| 1978–1983 | Stuttgarter Kickers | 137 | (66) |
| 1983–1985 | FC Basel | 20 | (8) |
| 1984–1985 | → FC Laufen (loan) | 30 | (11) |
| 1985–1990 | FC Schaffhausen | 121 | (33) |
| 1990 | FC Laufen | | |
| 1990–1991 | SV 03 Tübingen | | |
| 1991–1994 | FC Rottenburg | | |
| 1994–1998 | TSV Lustnau | | |

International career
| 1980 | West Germany U21 | 1 | (0) |

Managerial career
- 1990: FC Laufen
- 1991–1994: FC Rottenburg
- 1995–2016: TSV Lustnau
- * Club domestic league appearances and goals

Uwe Dreher (13 May 1960 – 20 October 2016) was a German professional footballer who played as a striker in the late 1970s and throughout the 80s. He later worked as coach.

== Career ==
Dreher was born and grew up in Tubingen in central Baden-Württemberg and he played his youth football with local amateur club SV 03 Tübingen. In 1978 he moved to Stuttgarter Kickers, who at that time played in the 2. Bundesliga Süd. He played there for five years as striker or centre forward, scoring 66 goals in 137 games. During this time, he was called up to the West Germany U21 national team and he played one game with them. The game against the Netherlands in Mönchengladbach ended with a 1–1 draw. Dreher was repeatedly set back by injuries, which prevented him from reaching the highest levels of football. His planned move to the then Bundesliga club 1. FC Kaiserslautern fell through, which ultimately led to his separation from the Kickers. Dreher reoriented himself and moved to Switzerland.

Dreher joined FC Basel's first team for their 1983–84 season under head coach Ernst-August Künnecke. After playing in nine test games Dreher played his domestic league debut for the club in the away game on 10 August 1983. He scored his first goal for his new team in the same game, but it could not help them as Basel were defeated 4–2 by Bellinzona. Dreher played regularly in the starting formation, until in April, then after a red card in the match against Chiasso, he lost contact to the team and never played again. In his one season with the team, he played a total of 43 games for Basel scoring a total of 27 goals. 20 of these games were in the domestic league, two in the Swiss Cup and 21 were friendly games. He scored eight goals in the domestic league, one in the cup and the other 18 were scored during the test games.

For the 1984–85 season, Dreher was loaned to FC Laufen, who under head coach Urs Siegenthaler had achieved promotion to the second highest tier of the Swiss football league system for the first time in the club's history. With Dreher as striker and team's top scorer, 11 goals in 30 appearances, they were able to avoid relegation.

In the summer of 1985 Dreher signed for FC Schaffhausen, who also played in the Swiss second tier. After just a short time, Dreher, who played first as striker and later as midfielder, became team-leader and captain. However, in spring and autumn 1989 recurring injuries forced him to step shorter and finally to retire. In 1990 Dreher was signed by FC Laufen, who in the meantime has returned to the amateur league, as player-coach. But this remained a short experience.

Returning home, Dreher rejoined SV 03 Tübingen and in 1991 he was hired by amateur club FC Rottenburg as player-coach, where he remained for three seasons.

He then took on various positions at the “club of his heart”, TSV Lustnau. One day after Dreher led the training as a temporary coach, the ex-professional player, who earned his money in the insurance business, died. "He lay down on the sofa and simply never woke up," said a relative.

== Sources ==
- Josef Zindel (2018). FC Basel 1893. Die ersten 125 Jahre (in German). Basel: Friedrich Reinhardt Verlag. ISBN 978-3-7245-2305-5.
- Verein "Basler Fussballarchiv" Homepage
