= Cesare Cosenza =

Swiss footballer (born 1960)

Personal information
- Full name: Cesare Cosenza
- Date of birth: 23 June 1960 (age 66)
- Place of birth: Switzerland
- Position: Defender

Senior career*
Years	Team	Apps	(Gls)
1982–1983	FC Basel	5	(1)
1987–1991	BSC Old Boys	110	(5)
- * Club domestic league appearances and goals

Cesare Cosenza (born 23 June 1960) is a Swiss retired footballer who played in the 1980s and early 1990s as a defender.

Cosenza joined FC Basel's first team during their 1982–83 season under head coach Rainer Ohlhauser. After playing in two test matches, Cosenza played his domestic league debut for the club in the away game on 7 November 1982 as Basel were defeated 0–1 by Wettingen. He scored his first goal for his club on 21 November in the away game against Luzern. But this could not save the team from a 3–4 defeat.

In his one season with the club, Cosenza played a total of eight games for Basel, scoring just that one goal. Five of these games were in the Nationalliga A and three were friendly games.

Following his time with Basel, Cosenza moved on. In the 1987–88 season, he played for the Old Boys in the Nationalliga B, the second tier of Swiss football. He played at least four seasons for them and made 110 domestic league appearances, scoring five goals.

== Sources ==
- Die ersten 125 Jahre. Publisher: Josef Zindel im Friedrich Reinhardt Verlag, Basel. ISBN 978-3-7245-2305-5
- Verein "Basler Fussballarchiv" Homepage
