= Martin Andermatt =

Swiss football manager (born 1961)

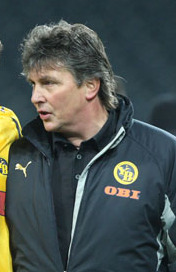
- Martin Andermatt managing Young Boys in 2008

Personal information
- Date of birth: 21 November 1961 (age 64)
- Place of birth: Baar, Switzerland
- Height: 1.79 m (5 ft 10 in)
- Position: Defender

Team information
- Current team: Yverdon-Sport (technical director)

Senior career*
Years	Team	Apps	(Gls)
1977–1979	FC Zug		
1979–1983	FC Wettingen		
1983–1985	FC Basel	57	(11)
1985–1990	Grasshoppers	125	(19)
1990–1992	FC Wettingen		
1992–1997	FC Emmenbrücke		

International career
1983–1989	Switzerland	11	(0)

Managerial career
- 1995–1997: FC Emmenbrücke (Player-manager)
- 1997–1998: FC Winterthur
- 1998–1999: FC Baden
- 1999–2000: SSV Ulm
- 2001–2002: Eintracht Frankfurt
- 2002–2003: FC Wil
- 2003–2005: FC Vaduz
- 2003–2006: Liechtenstein
- 2006–2008: Young Boys
- 2009–2010: FC Aarau
- 2011–2012: Bellinzona
- 2013: Bellinzona
- 2014–2015: Zug 94
- 2016–2018: Hannover 96 (advisor)
- 2021–2022: Schaffhausen
- 2022–2023: Basel (assistant)
- 2025–: Yverdon-Sport (technical director)
- 2026: Yverdon-Sport
- * Club domestic league appearances and goals

Martin Andermatt (born 21 November 1961) is a Swiss football manager and a former player who is the technical director of Swiss Challenge League club Yverdon-Sport.

== Club career ==
The trained teacher began his career as player with SC Zug, FC Baar, FC Emmenbrücke, and Wettingen. After this followed assignments as professional with FC Basel and later Grasshopper Club Zürich.

Andermatt joined Basel's first team for their 1983–84 season under head coach Ernst-August Künnecke. After playing in nine test games Andermatt played his domestic league debut for his new club in the away game in the Stadio Comunale on 10 August 1983 as Basel were defeated 2–4 by Bellinzona. He scored his first goal for the club just three days later, on 13 August in the home game in the St. Jakob Stadium. It was the fourth goal of the game as Basel won 5–2 against Luzern.

He played for the club for two years. Between the years 1983 and 1985 Andermatt played a total of 101 games for Basel scoring a total of 21 goals. 57 of these games were in the Nationalliga A, 5 in the Swiss Cup and 39 were friendly games. He scored 11 goals in the domestic league, 1 in the cup and the other 9 were scored during the test games.

Andermatt then moved to Grasshopper Club Zürich. In his time with the Grasshoppers he won the Swiss Championship and Cup. He then moved to back to FC Wettingen, where he stayed for two seasons and then to FC Emmenbrücke where he also stayed for two seasons before retiring from active football

== International career ==
He made regular appearances in the Switzerland national team between 1983 and 1989.

== Coaching career ==
His managerial career began with FC Emmenbrücke where he was player manager from 1995 to 1997. After this he spent a season with each, FC Winterthur and FC Baden.

In March 1999 he took on German second division side SSV Ulm 1846, then on 5th place and in the course of the season's last 11 matchdays led them to the third place, and thus the first ever promotion to the Bundesliga. After 24 matches there the club was closer to an UEFA Cup rank then to the relegation zone, but a crisis thereafter saw the SSV 1846 passed down again after just a single season. After bad results at the beginning of the new year in the second division Andermatt was let go already in September. This maneuver did not help the club at all and by the end of that season Ulm had gone all the way to the third division.

From June 2001 until his premature exit in March 2002 he was hired by German side Eintracht Frankfurt which was just relegated to the second division in the hope that he might lead the team to an immediate return to the Bundesliga. After the fulfillment of this aspiration became more and more unrealistic he was replaced halfway through the second half of the season.

After this he returned to Switzerland and took over the reins at first division side FC Wil where he was fired in 2003 after the brief and turbulent take-over by former European Footballer of the Year winner Igor Belanov.

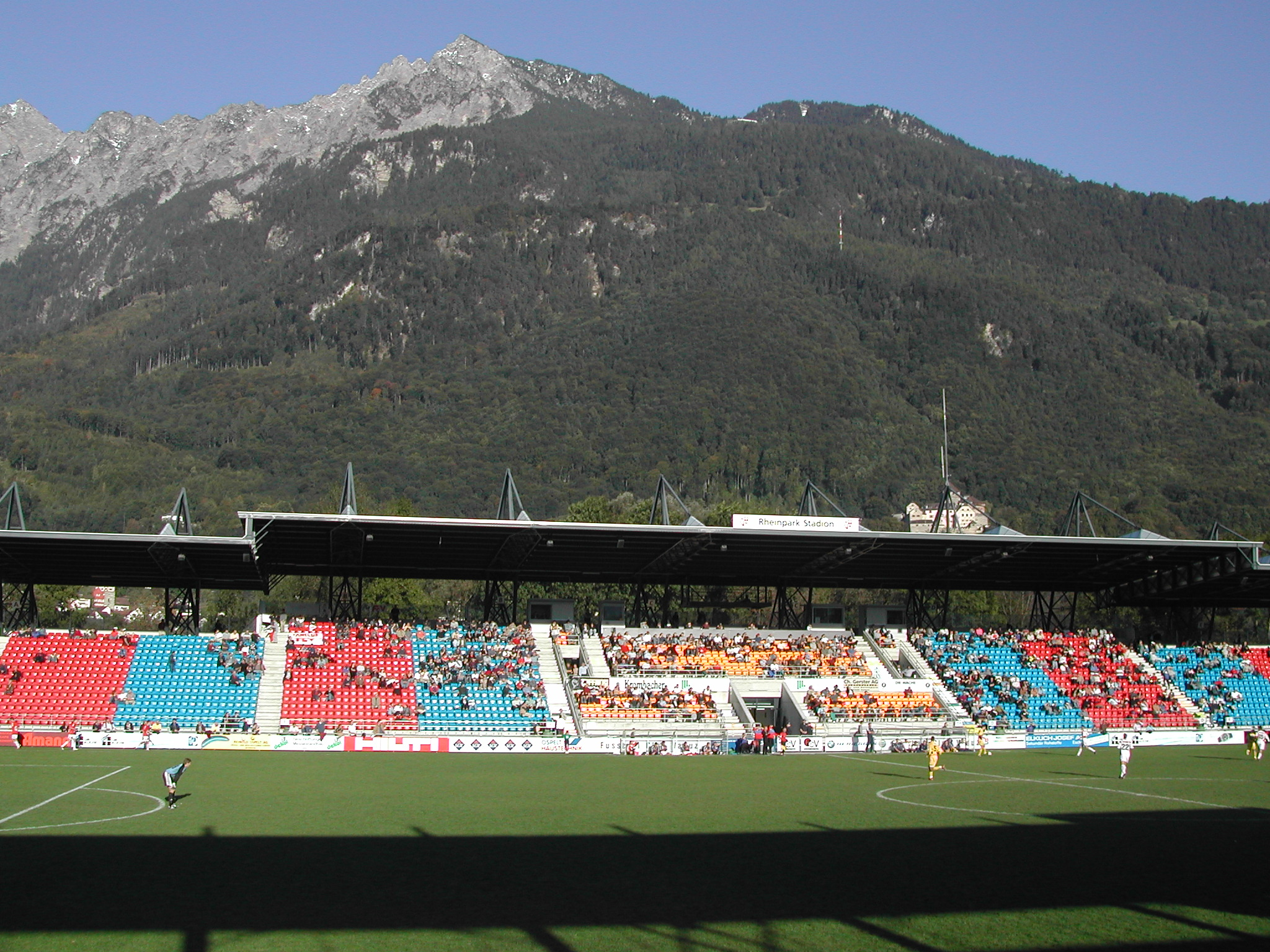
The Rheinpark Stadion in Vaduz, Liechtenstein (capacity of 6 127)

From 2003 to 2005 he coached FC Vaduz in Liechtenstein and alongside this the national side of the principality, where he could achieve some surprising results when drawing. 2-2 against Portugal, the losing finalists of the Euro 2004. Before this result, Liechtenstein had lost all of its previous 20 World Cup qualifiers. The team also caused a shock in the return match at the end of the group phase when Benjamin Fischer scored and Liechtenstein led at half time before eventually losing 2-1. Liechtenstein under andermatt also won 4-0 at Luxembourg. On the other hand, Liechtenstein are the only country ever to lose to San Marino with a 0-1 loss in a friendly match on 28 April 2004.

The club side led in the Swiss second division for a long stretch of the 2004/05 season. At the end of the season FC Vaduz had a minor crisis which saw the slipping and Andermatt was fired four rounds before the end of the season. Vaduz missed out on promotion in the play-off matches versus Neuchâtel Xamax.

Andermatt however retained his position with the national team until October 2006 when he took the manager job with BSC Young Boys in Bern. There he finished his first season 4th.

On 17 September 2021, he was hired by Schaffhausen in the Swiss Challenge League. The club hired Artim Šakiri as a new manager just two weeks prior, but Šakiri was not able to obtain a work permit quickly, and the club hired Andermatt instead. Despite leading Schaffhausen to a second-place finish in the 2021-22 Swiss Challenge League (sadly, missing out on promotion in the promotion playoff), his contract was not renewed for the following season.

On 10 June 2022, Andermatt was hired as an assistant coach by Basel.

On 9 March 2026, he returned to coaching, taking the head coach position at Swiss Challenge League side Yverdon-Sport. On 22 September 2026, he left his head coach position, while staying with Yverdon as a technical director.

== Personal life ==
Andermatt's son, Nicolas, is also a professional footballer.

== Honours ==
=== Player ===
Grasshoppers

- Swiss Championship: 1989–90
- Swiss Cup: 1987–88, 1988–89, 1989–90
- Swiss Super Cup: 1989
