= Serge Gaisser =

French footballer (born 1958)

Personal information
- Date of birth: 5 January 1958 (age 68)
- Place of birth: Muespach, France
- Height: 1.76 m (5 ft 9 in)
- Position: Midfielder

Youth career
- –1976: Saint-Louis

Senior career*
Years	Team	Apps	(Gls)
1976–1977	Saint-Louis	17	(2)
1977–1978	Racing Besançon	6	(0)
1978–1979	Saint-Louis		
1979–1983	Basel	71	(9)
1983–1986	Mulhouse	34	(2)
1986–1987	Concordia Basel		
- * Club domestic league appearances and goals

Serge Gaisser (born 5 January 1958) is a French former professional footballer who played as a midfielder and is best known for his years with FC Basel and FC Mulhouse.

== Career ==
Born in Muespach, Gaisser grew up in Saint-Louis, Haut-Rhin and started his football by the localclub Saint-Louis Neuweg, who at that time played in the French Division 3, the third tier of French football. However, he started his professional football career by Racing Besançon in the 1977–78 French Division 2. But because he only played in six games during the entire season as the team finished in second position in the league, Gaisser returned somewhat disillusioned to Saint-Louis, who in the meantime had suffered relegation.

A year later Gaisser signed for FC Basel, under head coach Helmut Benthaus, at the begin of the 1979–80 Nationalliga A season. In the pre-season Gaisser played in nine test games. Two of these were in the 1979 Uhrencup and in the final against Grenchen) he scored a goal as Basel won 4–1 to lift the trophy. Gaisser played his domestic league debut for his new club in the home game in the St. Jakob Stadium on 11 August 1979 as Basel won 2–1 against Sion. He scored his first goal for his new team on 25 November in the home game as Basel won 7–0 against Lugano. He played 23 league games during that season, scoring 3 goals, and thus helped Basel win the championship title.

In the first round of the 1980–81 European Cup, in the return leg, Gaisser scored the last goal of the game as Basel won 4–1 against Club Brugge to advance to the next round. In the 1981 Coppa delle Alpi final against Sochaux, which ended 2–2 and Basel won in the penalty shoot-out, Gaisser scored one goal and successfully converted his penalty.

He stayed with Basel for four seasons and during this time he played a total of 144 games for Basel scoring a total of 32 goals. 71 of these games were in the Swiss Super League, 12 in the Swiss Cup and League Cup, seven in the UEFA competitions (European Cup and Cup of the Alps) and 54 were friendly games. He scored nine goals in the domestic league, two in the Swiss Cup, one in the afore mentioned match in the European Cup and the other 18 were scored during the test games.

Gaisser transferred to Mulhouse before the start of the 1983–84 French Division 2 season. He played three seasons for Mulhouse, he played regularly during his first season, but there-after played mainly in their reserve team. He transferred back to Switzerland in 1986 and joined Concordia Basel to end his football career.

== Personal life ==
Later, Gaisser acted as trainer for the youth teams by local French clubs Sierentz, Muespach and Blotzheim. Gaisser worked in accounting, finance and controlling in the construction and transport department of Basel-Stadt until his retirement.

== Honours ==
- Swiss League: 1979–80
- Uhrencup: 1979, 1980
- Cup of the Alps: 1981

== Sources ==
- Rotblau: Jahrbuch Saison 2017/2018. Publisher: FC Basel Marketing AG. ISBN 978-3-7245-2189-1
- Die ersten 125 Jahre. Publisher: Josef Zindel im Friedrich Reinhardt Verlag, Basel. ISBN 978-3-7245-2305-5
- Verein "Basler Fussballarchiv" Homepage
- Cup of the Alps 1981 at RSSSF
