= Roger Läubli =

Swiss footballer and manager (born 1951)

Personal information
- Date of birth: 25 October 1951 (age 75)
- Position: Goalkeeper

Senior career*
Years	Team	Apps	(Gls)
1983–1986	FC La Chaux-de-Fonds		
1987–1989	Neuchâtel Xamax		

Managerial career
- 1990–1992: FC La Chaux-de-Fonds
- 1993–1996: SR Delémont
- 1999: BSC Young Boys
- * Club domestic league appearances and goals

Roger Läubli (born 25 October 1951) is a Swiss retired football goalkeeper and later manager.
