= Thomas Paul (footballer, born 1961) =

Swiss footballer (born 1961)

Personal information
- Full name: Thomas Paul
- Date of birth: 20 March 1961 (age 65)
- Position: Goalkeeper

Senior career*
Years	Team	Apps	(Gls)
1981–1986	FC Basel	12	(0)
1990–1994	BSC Old Boys	66	(0)
- * Club domestic league appearances and goals

Thomas Paul (born 20 March 1961) is a Swiss retired footballer who played in the 1980s and 1990s as goalkeeper.

Paul joined FC Basel's first team for their 1981–82 season under manager Helmut Benthaus. Paul played mainly in their reserve team. After playing for the first team in two test games, Paul played his domestic league debut for the club in the away game on 18 March 1984 as Basel were defeated 1–4 by Grasshopper Club. He had to play, because their first team goalkeepers Hans Müller and Urs Suter were both missing because of injury. In that season he played eight league matches, keeping three clean sheets. Paul stayed at least five seasons with the club and during this time he played a total of 37 games for Basel. 12 of these games were in the Nationalliga A and 25 were friendly games.

Following his time with Basel, Paul joined local rivals Old Boys, who at that time played in the Nationlliga B, the second tier of Swiss football. For them he played 66 domestic league games.

== Sources ==
- Rotblau: Jahrbuch Saison 2017/2018. Publisher: FC Basel Marketing AG. ISBN 978-3-7245-2189-1
- Die ersten 125 Jahre. Publisher: Josef Zindel im Friedrich Reinhardt Verlag, Basel. ISBN 978-3-7245-2305-5
- Verein "Basler Fussballarchiv" Homepage
