= Winfried Berkemeier =

German footballer

Personal information
- Full name: Winfried Berkemeier
- Date of birth: 22 January 1953 (age 73)
- Place of birth: Gronau, North Rhine-Westphalia West Germany
- Positions: Midfielder; striker

Youth career
- –1973: SG Düren 99

Senior career*
Years	Team	Apps	(Gls)
1973–1975	1. FC Köln	4	(0)
1975–1978	Tennis Borussia Berlin	104	(16)
1978–1979	1. FC Nürnberg	32	(4)
1979–1981	FC Schalke 04	29	(5)
1981–1982	BSC Young Boys	31	(3)
1982–1983	FC Basel	22	(2)
1983–1985	FC Raron		

Managerial career
- 1984–1985: FC Raron
- 1995–1997: FC Termen/Ried-Brig
- 2000–2001: FC Naters (assistant)
- 2002–2005: FC Visp (assistant)
- 2006–2008: FC Naters (assistant)
- * Club domestic league appearances and goals

Winfried Berkemeier (born 22 January 1953) is a former German footballer.

This midfielder and forward played six seasons in the Bundesliga for four teams. Though he was unable to break through with 1. FC Köln, he played with Tennis Borussia Berlin and through the whole of his first season only missed one game.

Berkemeier had little luck, however, since with four of the teams he joined, they were to immediately be demoted from the 1. Bundesliga, amongst these occasions being in 1977 with Tennis Borussia Berlin, in 1979 with 1. FC Nürnberg and in 1981 with FC Schalke 04.

Berkemeier then moved to Switzerland and played for Young Boys and then for Basel before he became a manager in 1984.

He joined Basel's first team for their 1982–83 season under trainer Helmut Benthaus. After three test matches and four matches in the Cup of the Alps, Berkemeier played his domestic league debut for his new club in the home game at the Landhof on 14 August 1982 as Basel were defeated 0–1 by the Young Boys. He scored his first goal for his club on 18 September in the away game against Xamax, but this could not save the team from a 2–3 defeat. During his time with Basel, Berkemeier played a total of 41 games for Basel scoring a total of eight goals. 22 of these games were in the Nationalliga A, three in the Swiss Cup, four in the Cup of the Alps and 12 were friendly games. He scored two goals in the domestic league, two in the cup and the other four were scored during the test games.

After his time in Basel Berkemeier moved to FC Raron and became player-manager.
