= Roger Bossert =

Swiss footballer (born 1961)

Personal information
- Full name: Roger Bossert
- Date of birth: 4 October 1961 (age 65)
- Position: Defender

Senior career*
Years	Team	Apps	(Gls)
1982–1983	FC Basel	5	(0)
1983–1985	FC Laufen	34	(1)
1987–1988	FC Baden	15	(0)
- * Club domestic league appearances and goals

Roger Bossert (born 4 October 1961) is a Swiss retired footballer who played in the 1980s as defender.

Bossert joined FC Basel's first team for their 1982–83 season und head-coach Rainer Ohlhauser. Bossert played his debut for the club in the away game in the Swiss Cup on 17 October 1982 as Basel won 4–0 against lower tier local club FC Breitenbach. He played his domestic league debut for the club in the away game on 21 November as Basel were defeated 3–4 by Luzern.

In his one season with the club Bossert played a total of 12 games for Basel without scoring a goal. Five of these games were in the Nationalliga A, two in the Swiss Cup and five were friendly games.

Following his season with Basel, Bossert moved on to play for FC Laufen in the Nationalliga B, the second tier of Swiss football. He stayed with Laufen for two seasons and he played at least one season with FC Baden.

== Sources ==
- Die ersten 125 Jahre. Publisher: Josef Zindel im Friedrich Reinhardt Verlag, Basel. ISBN 978-3-7245-2305-5
- Verein "Basler Fussballarchiv" Homepage
