= Muespach =

Commune in Grand Est, France

- Commune
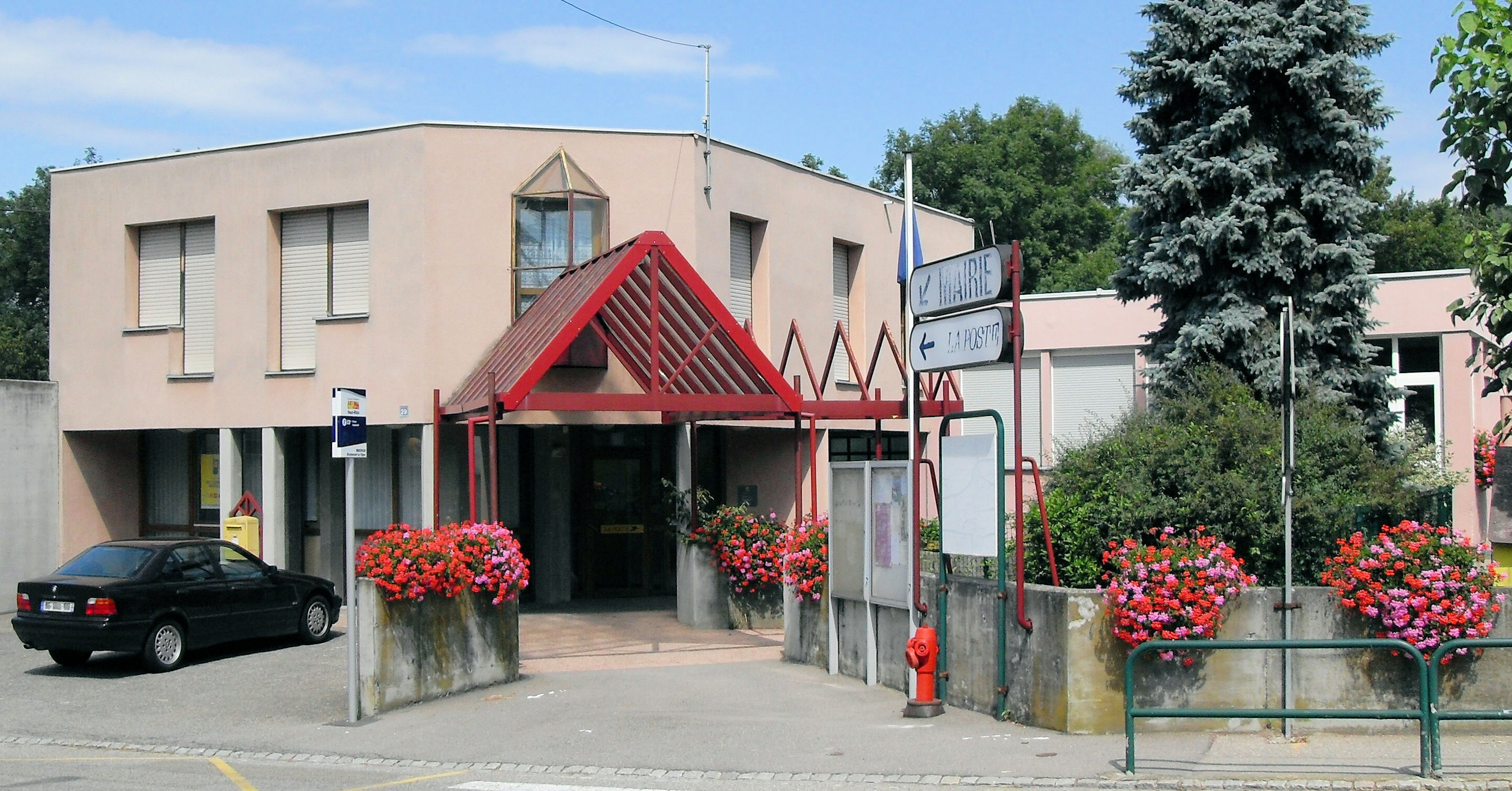
- The town hall in Muespach

- Coat of arms
- Location of Muespach
- Location within France Location within Grand Est
- Coordinates: 47°32′54″N 7°22′52″E
- Country: France
- Region: Grand Est
- Department: Haut-Rhin
- Arrondissement: Altkirch
- Canton: Altkirch

Government
  - Mayor (2020–2026): Régine Rentz-Hatstatt
- Area^{1}: 11.37 km^{2} (4.39 sq mi)
- Elevation: 400 m (1,300 ft)
- Highest elevation: 471 m (1,545 ft)
- Lowest elevation: 371 m (1,217 ft)
- Population (2023): 942
  - Density: 82.8/km^{2} (215/sq mi)
- Time zone: UTC+01:00 (CET)
  - Summer (DST): UTC+02:00 (CEST)
- INSEE/Postal code: 68221 /68640
- ^{1} French Land Register data, which excludes lakes, ponds, glaciers > 1 km^{2} (0.386 sq mi or 247 acres) and river estuaries.

Muespach (German: Müspach) is a commune in the Haut-Rhin department in the Grand Est region in north-eastern France.

== See also ==
- Communes of the Haut-Rhin département
