= Nicolas Keller =

Swiss footballer (born 1963)

Personal information
- Full name: Nicolas Keller
- Date of birth: 27 May 1963 (age 63)
- Positions: Defender; midfielder

Senior career*
Years	Team	Apps	(Gls)
1980–1982	FC Chiasso	22	(0)
1982–1985	FC Basel	10	(0)
- * Club domestic league appearances and goals

Nicolas Keller (born 27 May 1963) was a Swiss footballer who played in the 1980s. He played as midfielder, but also as defender.

Keller first played for Chiasso in the 1980–81 Nationalliga A and 1981–82 seasons.

Keller then joined FC Basel's first team during their 1982–83 season under head coach Rainer Ohlhauser. Keller played his domestic league debut for his new club in the away game on 16 April as Basel were defeated 0–1 by Sion.

Keller played three seasons for the club and during that time he played a total of 17 games for Basel without scoring a goal. Ten of these games were in the Nationalliga A and seven were friendly games.

== Sources ==
- Die ersten 125 Jahre. Publisher: Josef Zindel im Friedrich Reinhardt Verlag, Basel. ISBN 978-3-7245-2305-5
- Verein "Basler Fussballarchiv" Homepage
