= Claudio Tedeschi =

Swiss footballer (born 1955)

Personal information
- Date of birth: 15 September 1955 (age 71)
- Position: Defender

Senior career*
Years	Team	Apps	(Gls)
1974–1983	AC Bellinzona		
1984–1985	FC Lugano		
1985–1986	FC Chiasso		
1986–1987	FC Locarno		

Managerial career
- 1989–1990: AC Bellinzona
- 2003–2004: AC Bellinzona
- * Club domestic league appearances and goals

Claudio Tedeschi (born 15 September 1955) is a retired Swiss football defender and later manager.
