= Ernst-August Künnecke =

German football manager (1938–2002)

Personal information
- Date of birth: 3 January 1938
- Date of death: 16 March 2002 (aged 64)
- Position: Midfielder

Youth career
- Hannover 96

Senior career*
Years	Team	Apps	(Gls)
–1960	Hannover 96		
1960–1962	VfV Hildesheim		
1962–1964	SV Arminia Hannover		
1964–	Hannover 96		

Managerial career
- 1967–1969: SC Tuttlingen
- 1969–1971: Patro Eisden
- 1971–1976: K.R.C. Mechelen
- 1976–1977: VfR Heilbronn
- 1977–1979: KFC Winterslag
- 1979–1981: Lierse
- 1982–1983: Waterschei Thor
- 1983–1985: Basel
- 1985–1986: K.V. Mechelen
- 1988: K.R.C. Genk
- 1989–1992: Basel
- 1993–1994: TuS Celle
- 1994–1996: SC Brühl
- 1997–1998: FC Kreuzlingen
- * Club domestic league appearances and goals

Ernst-August Künnecke (born 3 January 1938 – 16 March 2002) was a German football player and football coach.

== Career ==
Künnecke played his youth football with Hannover 96. He advanced and played at amateur level. In 1960 he became amateur champion with Hannover 96. Künnecke remained amateur, but his playing career did not last long. He moved to VfV Hildesheim and later to SV Arminia Hannover, before returning to Hannover 96.

In 1967 Künnecke started his coaching career with SC Tuttlingen, a small amateur club in the south of the Black Forest. In 1969 he signed as head coach for Patro Eisden in Belgium. Afterwards, Künnecke moved to second division Racing Mechelen and won the title and were promoted in the 1974–75 season, but were relegated a year later. He was also head coach for VfR Heilbronn, KFC Winterslag, Lierse S.K. and Waterschei Thor.

Künnecke joined Basel's first team for their 1983–84 season and signed a two-year contract. His reputation grew because of his conveyance, his advancing and his greatest strength was the furtherance of young players. As the season advanced it became increasingly apparent that Künnecke's ideas were not reaching the entire team squad at all times. Basel's youngsters played well during this season, Fredy Grossenbacher, Martin Jeitziner, Peter Nadig, Thomas Hauser and Beat Sutter advanced well under Künnecke. But Künnecke's ideas were not being accepted by the older, experienced players. At home, in the St. Jakob Stadium the team was playing well and winning the games, the first five home games were all won. However, the first seven away games all ended with a defeat. After the winter break Basel lost their first home game against La Chaux-de-Fonds 0–1. Künnecke reacted immediately and this was the last game that the three veterans Arthur von Wartburg, Jörg Stohler and Jean-Pierre Maradan played in the team. The supporters had noted the differences and the final home game of the season attracted only 2,000 spectators. The following season Basel lost three of their first four matches. Then, following a run of five defeats and five draws with only one win, the team suffered one defeat too many against Lausanne-Sport on 11 November, and Basel's club chairman Urs Gribi fired Künnecke.

Following two seasons with K.V. Mechelen and another with K.R.C. Genk, Künnecke was contacted by Basel's new chairman Charles Röthlisberger. In the meantime, Basel had suffered relegation, Röthlisberger had sacked Urs Siegenthaler and then he re-installed Künnecke as head coach. Künnecke settled in Switzerland and stayed with the club nearly three years, until in March 1992 chairman Röthlisberger released him from his position, due to a run of poor results.

One year as head coach with TuS Celle, two years with Brühl St. Gallen, then a short period with Dynamo Dresden as youth manager, then one season as head coach for Kreuzlingen was Künnecke’s final stations while he lived in Switzerland. In 1998 he returned to Belgium and became the coach of third division team Rita Berlaar. Künnecke suffered from a lingering illness and died in March 2002 from the effects of that illness.

== Sources ==
- Rotblau: Jahrbuch Saison 2017/2018. Publisher: FC Basel Marketing AG. ISBN 978-3-7245-2189-1
- Die ersten 125 Jahre. Publisher: Josef Zindel im Friedrich Reinhardt Verlag, Basel. ISBN 978-3-7245-2305-5
- Ernst-August Künnecke at Verein "Basler Fussballarchiv" site
