= Uhrencup =

Tournament details
- Host country: Switzerland
- Dates: 10–14 July
- Teams: 4 (from 3 confederations)
- Venues: 2 (in 2 host cities)

Final positions
- Champions: (England) Wolverhampton Wanderers (1st title)
- Runners-up: (Netherlands) Feyenoord
- Third place: (Switzerland) Young Boys
- Fourth place: (Switzerland) FC Basel

Tournament statistics
- Matches played: 4
- Goals scored: 15 (3.75 per match)
- Top scorer(s): Bonatini, Mir, van Persie (2 goals each)

The Uhrencup is a club football tournament, held annually in Grenchen and Biel in Switzerland. The Uhrencup is seen as a testament to the major influence that is exercised by the local watchmaking industry on the cultural lives of the area's residents (Uhren is German for "watches"). The tournament usually features four teams (sometimes more), each playing two matches, and is held in July as a friendly tournament, the format of which tends to be fluid. For the teams taking part, the tournament is a welcome opportunity to prepare for the upcoming football season.

== Origin ==
Founded in 1962 by representatives of Grenchen's watchmaking industry, the first Uhrencup was held to celebrate the inauguration of the new grandstand at the local Brühl stadium. Due to the tournament's reverberating success it was repeated the following year and, thanks to the sponsoring from the local watch industry, it continues to be held annually (with the exception of 1967, 1974 and 2012).

== History ==
=== Established as an international tournament (1962–1968) ===
The first Uhrencup in 1962 already featured an international line-up. Together with the two local clubs FC Grenchen and FC Biel-Bienne, the Belgian team Cercle Brügge and Italian team AC Como also took part in the tournament. Due to its success and because it attracted about 20,000 spectators, it was repeated the following year.

The English side Ipswich Town won the tournament in 1963 and the Dutch team Sparta Rotterdam was the second international representative. A year later German club Karlsruher SC and the French team Nîmes Olympique competed in the Uhrencup. In 1965 Lanerossi Vicenza won the competition, Maccabi Tel Aviv also took part. In 1966 and again in 1968 FC Sochaux took part, winning the first of the two competitions, but not being at all successful two years later. In 1967 the competition was not held.

=== Uhrencup as regional event (1969–2002) ===
At the end of the 1967–68 Nationalliga A season Grenchen were relegated and therefore the tournament lost its international significance. From here on it was mainly Swiss sides that took part in the Uhrencup and it turned into a regional event. FC Basel took part for the first time in 1969 and won the cup 5–3 in the final against Biel-Bienne, Wenger, Hauser (twice), Balmer and Odermatt scoring the Basel goals. A year later Basel defended the title with an 8–7 win after penalties following a 5–5 at full-time.

The next year the home team Grenchen won the cup for the second time, winning 3–1 against reigning Swiss Champions Basel, local boy Serge Muhmenthaler scoring one of the Grenchen goals. Neuchâtel Xamax won the Uhrencup 1972. Young Boys won the title 1973, Serge Muhmenthaler scoring a goal and winning his second Uhrencup title this time with his new team. In 1974 the competition was not held. Young Boys (1975) and Zürich (1976) were the next two cup winners. Serge Muhmenthaler reached his third Uhrencup Final with his third club in 1977 but was unable to repeat the success, the final ended in a 6–1 defeat against Neuchâtel Xamax. However reaching the final again in the next year Muhmenthaler won the 1978 Uhrencup with FC Basel 2–1 against the same finalists.

Basel won the title six times (1978, 1979, 1980, 1983, 1986, 1988), Grenchen won it three times (1981, 1982, 1985), Servette (1984) and Young Boys (1987) during the following years. As international teams were again invited to participate Partizan Belgrade (1989), Górnik Zabrze (1990) and 1. FC Köln (1991) competed and won the tournament.

During the following years (1992 to 2002) the Uhrencup returned to being a Swiss-Internal tournament. The winners being FC Zürich (three times), Grenchen (twice) and FC Solothurn, Grasshoppers and Sevette each once. FC Subingen, a team from the 2. Liga (then fourth tier of the Swiss Football League) won Uhrencup in 1997.

=== New edition as an international tournament (2003–2011) ===
In 2003 a new organising committee took over the marketing of the Uhrencup and with added financial help it was again possible to invite international teams. Casino SW Bregenz, FC Schalke 04, 1. FC Kaiserslautern (twice), 1. FC Köln, Bayer Leverkusen, FC Red Bull Salzburg, Celtic Glasgow, Borussia Dortmund, Legia Warsaw and Panathinaikos Athens have participated during this period, but only Trabzonspor (2005) and Shakhtar Donetsk (2009) were able to win the title.

2010 was a truly international affair, with only one club (Young Boys) originating from Switzerland. The remaining competitors were Deportivo de La Coruña from Spain, the Dutch side Twente Enschede and the eventual winner VfB Stuttgart from Germany.

Basel won the competition for the twelfth time. In the 2011 event, they beat Hertha Berlin 3–0, and then went on to defeat West Ham 2–1 in their second game. The second Swiss team, Young Boys Bern, also won both matches against the international teams, but had a lower overall goal score with 6–3. To celebrate the 50th edition of the tournament, the current German champion Borussia Dortmund played a friendly game against the Swiss vice champion FC Zürich, which ended with a 1–1 tie.

=== Since 2013 ===
In 2012 the tournament was not held, but was held in 2013 between 5 and 9 July with Basel and Grasshopper Club Zürich taking part. For Basel it was the 29th time that they would take place; they have won the competition thirteen times. The tournament again took a hiatus, this time of two years before returning in 2015.

== 2011 ==
=== Standings ===
Pos	Team	Pld	W	WP	LP	L	GF	GA	GD	Pts	Final result
1	(Switzerland) Basel	2	2	0	0	0	5	1	+4	6	2011 Uhrencup Champions
2	(Switzerland) Young Boys	2	2	0	0	0	6	3	+3	6	
3	(England) West Ham United	2	0	0	0	2	2	4	−2	0	
4	(Germany) Hertha Berlin	2	0	0	0	2	2	7	−5	0	

Rules for classification: 1) Points; 2) Goal difference; 3) Goals scored; 4) Goal ratio

=== Matches ===
8 July 2011
18:30 CEST

Young Boys (Switzerland)	4–2	(Germany) Hertha Berlin
Silberbauer 40' (pen.); Degen 49', 80'; Khalifa 56'	Report	Lasogga 44'; Mijatović 52'

Stadion Brühl, Grenchen

All Stars
9 July 2011
16:00 CEST
Final

Borussia Dortmund (Germany)	1–1	(Switzerland) FC Zürich
Błaszczykowski 12'	Report	Drmić 8'

Signal Iduna Park, Dortmund

11 July 2011
18:00 CEST

Young Boys (Switzerland)	2–1	(England) West Ham United
Schneuwly 17'; Affolter 39'	Report	Nouble 21'

Stadion Brühl, Grenchen

12 July 2011
20:30 CEST

Basel (Switzerland)	3–0	(Germany) Hertha Berlin
Frei 32' (pen.); Frei 44'; Frei 53'	Report

Stadion Brühl, Grenchen

13 July 2011
19:30 CEST

Basel (Switzerland)	2–1	(England) West Ham United
Pak 53'; Yapi 90+0' (pen.)	Report	Stanislas 75' (pen.)

St. Jakob-Park, Basel

== 2013 ==
=== Standings ===
Pos	Team	Pld	W	WP	LP	L	GF	GA	GD	Pts	Final result
1	(Switzerland) FC Basel	2	2	0	0	0	5	1	+4	6	2013 Uhrencup Champions
2	(Serbia) Red Star Belgrade	2	1	0	0	1	2	2	0	3	
3	(Germany) Fortuna Düsseldorf	2	0	1	0	1	2	4	−2	2	
4	(Switzerland) Grasshopper Club Zürich	2	0	0	1	1	1	3	−2	1	

Rules for classification: 1) Points; 2) Goal difference; 3) Goals scored; 4) Goal ratio

=== Matches ===
5 July 2013
18:30 CEST

FC Basel (Switzerland)	3–0	(Germany) Fortuna Düsseldorf
Jevtić 7'; Simić 68'; Adili 78'	Report

6 July 2013
18:30 CEST

Grasshopper Club Zürich (Switzerland)	0–1	(Serbia) Red Star Belgrade
	Report	Kasalica 30'

8 July 2013
18:30 CEST

FC Basel (Switzerland)	2–1	(Serbia) Red Star Belgrade
Stocker 80'; Bobadilla 88'	Report	Mladenović 42'; Kovačević (red card) 60'

9 July 2013
18:30 CEST

Grasshopper Club Zürich (Switzerland)	1–1	(Germany) Fortuna Düsseldorf
Feltscher 57'	Report	Benschop 36'
Penalties
	5–6

== 2015 ==
=== Standings ===
Pos	Team	Pld	W	WP	LP	L	GF	GA	GD	Pts	Final result
1	(Switzerland) Biel	1	1	0	0	0	2	0	+2	3	2015 Uhrencup Champions
2	(Germany) B. Mönchengladbach	1	1	0	0	0	2	1	+1	3	
3	(Switzerland) Sion	1	0	0	0	1	1	2	−1	0	
4	(Austria) A. Salzburg	1	0	0	0	1	0	2	−2	0	

Rules for classification: 1) Points; 2) Goal difference; 3) Goals scored; 4) Goal ratio

=== Matches ===
4 September 2015
18:30 CEST

B. Mönchengladbach (Germany)	2–1	(Switzerland) Sion
Hahn 7'; Hazard 19'	Report	Mujangi 87'

Tissot Arena, Biel/Bienne

5 September 2015
20:30 CEST

Biel (Switzerland)	2–0	(Austria) A. Salzburg
Barouch 44'; Mihajlović 70'	Report

Tissot Arena, Biel/Bienne

== 2016 ==
=== Standings ===
Pos	Team	Pld	W	WP	D	LP	L	GF	GA	GD	Pts	Final result
1	(Turkey) Galatasaray	2	1	0	1	0	0	4	1	+3	4	2016 Uhrencup Champions
2	(Switzerland) Zürich	2	1	0	0	0	1	2	4	−2	3	
3	(Germany) Borussia Mönchengladbach	2	0	1	0	0	1	5	5	0	2	
4	(Switzerland) Young Boys	2	0	0	1	1	0	4	5	−1	2	

Source: Uhrencup
Rules for classification: 1) Points; 2) Goal difference; 3) Goals scored; 4) Goal ratio

=== Matches ===
13 July 2016
19:30 CEST

Young Boys (Switzerland)	3–3	(Germany) Borussia Mönchengladbach
Vilotić 22'; Bertone 51'; Sulejmani 59'	Report	Hazard 20' (pen.), 45'; Ndenge 85'
Penalties
Sulejmani (penalty scored); Bertone (penalty missed); Ravet (penalty scored); Kubo (penalty scored); Gajić (penalty scored)	4–5	(penalty scored) Christensen; (penalty scored) Sow; (penalty scored) Ndenge; (penalty scored) Strobl; (penalty scored) Traoré

Stadion Brühl, Grenchen
Attendance: 4,480
Referee: Sandro Schärer (Switzerland)

15 July 2016
19:30 CEST

Borussia Mönchengladbach (Germany)	1–2	(Switzerland) Zürich
Hahn 59'		Winter 61'; Rodríguez 82' (pen.)

Tissot Arena, Biel
Attendance: 1,952
Referee: San Fedayi (Switzerland)

17 July 2016
16:00 CEST

Galatasaray (Turkey)	3–0	(Switzerland) Zürich
Bruma 36'; Adili 83'; Ünsal 86'	Report

Tissot Arena, Biel
Referee: San Fedayi (Switzerland)

19 July 2016
19:30 CEST

Young Boys (Switzerland)	1–1	(Turkey) Galatasaray
Lecjaks 84'	Report	Bruma 14'

Tissot Arena, Biel
Referee: Nikolaj Hänni (Switzerland)

== 2017 ==
=== Standings ===
Pos	Team	Pld	W	WP	LP	L	GF	GA	GD	Pts	Final result
1	(England) Stoke City	2	1	1	0	0	4	2	+2	5	2017 Uhrencup Champions
2	(Switzerland) BSC Young Boys	2	1	0	1	0	7	4	+3	4	
3	(Portugal) S.L. Benfica	2	1	0	0	1	3	5	−2	3	
4	(Switzerland) Neuchâtel Xamax	2	0	0	0	2	0	3	−3	0	

=== Results ===
10 July 2017
20:00 CEST

Neuchâtel Xamax (Switzerland)	0–1	(England) Stoke City
	Report	Djuric 86' (o.g.)

Tissot Arena, Biel/Bienne

12 July 2017
20:00 CEST

BSC Young Boys (Switzerland)	2–2	(England) Stoke City
Hoarau 43'; Ravet 46'	Report	Adam 56' (pen.); Muniesa 57'
Penalties
Ravet (penalty missed); Gerndt (penalty scored); Bertone (penalty scored); Schick (penalty scored); Bürki (penalty missed); Wüthrich (penalty missed); Aebischer (penalty missed); Sulejmanov (penalty missed)	3–4	(penalty missed) Edwards; (penalty scored) Souttar; (penalty missed) Sweeney; (penalty scored) Telford; (penalty scored) Campbell; (penalty missed) Tymon; (penalty missed) Shenton; (penalty scored) Crouch

Tissot Arena, Biel/Bienne

13 July 2017
20:00 CEST

S.L. Benfica (Portugal)	2–0	(Switzerland) Neuchâtel Xamax
Jonas 5'; Seferovic 18'	Report

Stadion Brühl, Grenchen

15 July 2017
17:00 CEST

S.L. Benfica (Portugal)	1–5	(Switzerland) BSC Young Boys
Jonas 22'	Report	Assalé 25', 74'; Sulejmani 51'; Fassnacht 86', 88'

Tissot Arena, Biel/Bienne

== 2018 ==
=== Standings ===
Pos	Team	Pld	W	WP	LP	L	GF	GA	GD	Pts	Final result
1	(England) Wolverhampton Wanderers	2	2	0	0	0	6	1	+5	6	2018 Uhrencup Champions
2	(Netherlands) Feyenoord	2	1	0	0	1	5	3	+2	3	
3	(Switzerland) BSC Young Boys	2	1	0	0	1	3	4	−1	3	
4	(Switzerland) FC Basel	2	0	0	0	2	1	7	−6	0	

=== Results ===
10 July 2018
18:00 CEST

FC Basel (Switzerland)	1–2	(England) Wolverhampton Wanderers
Van Wolfswinkel 9'	Report	Mir 17'; Jota 50'

Tissot Arena, Biel/Bienne

11 July 2018
18:00 CEST

BSC Young Boys (Switzerland)	3–0	(Netherlands) Feyenoord
Hoarau 31'; Mbabu (yellow card) 44'; Nsame 76'; Wüthrich 80'	Report

Tissot Arena, Biel/Bienne

13 July 2018
20:00 CEST

FC Basel (Switzerland)	0–5	(Netherlands) Feyenoord
Dié (yellow card) 48'; Zuffi (yellow card) 66'; Ajeti (yellow card) 71'	Report	van Persie 2', 61'; Berghuis 45'; Botteghin 71'; Vilhena 79'

Tissot Arena, Biel/Bienne

14 July 2018
15:00 CEST

BSC Young Boys (Switzerland)	0–4	(England) Wolverhampton Wanderers
	Report	Bonatini 26', 54'; Costa 30'; Mir 89'

Stadion Neufeld, Bern

== 2019 ==
=== Standings ===
Pos	Team	Pld	W	WP	LP	L	GF	GA	GD	Pts	Final result
1	(Switzerland) BSC Young Boys	2	2	0	0	0	7	1	+6	6	2019 Uhrencup Champions
2	(Germany) Eintracht Frankfurt	2	1	0	0	1	4	6	−2	3	
3	(England) Crystal Palace	2	0	1	0	1	2	3	−1	2	
4	(Switzerland) FC Luzern	2	0	0	1	1	2	5	−3	1	

=== Results ===
9 July 2019
20:00 CEST

FC Luzern (Switzerland)	1–2	(England) Crystal Palace
Schürpf 6'	Report	Benteke 1'
Penalties
	5–6

Tissot Arena, Biel/Bienne

10 July 2019
20:00 CEST

BSC Young Boys (Switzerland)	5–1	(Germany) Eintracht Frankfurt
Hoarau 6'; Ngamaleu 30'; Nsame 68'; Gaudino 75', 82'	Report	Kamada 86'

Tissot Arena, Biel/Bienne

12 July 2019
20:00 CEST

FC Luzern (Switzerland)	1–3	(Germany) Eintracht Frankfurt
Voca 44'	Report	Kamada 8'; Haller 17'; Paciência 76'

Tissot Arena, Biel/Bienne

13 July 2019
15:00 CEST

BSC Young Boys (Switzerland)	2–0	(England) Crystal Palace
Ngamaleu 5'; Hoarau 32'	Report

Stadion Neufeld, Bern

== Uhrencup winners by year ==
Year	Placements			
Year	Winner	2nd Place	3rd Place	4th place
1962	(Switzerland) FC Grenchen	(Belgium) Cercle Brugge K.S.V.	(Italy) Calcio Como	(Switzerland) FC Biel-Bienne
1963	(England) Ipswich Town	(Switzerland) FC Grenchen	(Switzerland) FC Biel-Bienne	(Netherlands) Sparta Rotterdam
1964	(Switzerland) BSC Young Boys	(Germany) Karlsruher SC	(France) Nîmes Olympique	(Switzerland) FC Grenchen
1965	(Italy) Lanerossi Vicenza	(Switzerland) FC Grenchen	(Switzerland) BSC Young Boys	(Israel) Maccabi Tel Aviv F.C.
1966	(France) FC Sochaux-Montbéliard	(Switzerland) FC Grenchen	(Italy) Lanerossi Vicenza	(Switzerland) FC Biel-Bienne
1967	Not held			
1968	(Switzerland) FC Biel-Bienne	(Switzerland) BSC Young Boys	(France) FC Sochaux-Montbéliard	(Switzerland) FC Grenchen
1969	(Switzerland) FC Basel	(Switzerland) FC Biel-Bienne	(Switzerland) FC Grenchen	(Switzerland) FC Lausanne-Sport
1970	(Switzerland) FC Basel	(Switzerland) BSC Young Boys	(Switzerland) FC Biel-Bienne	(Switzerland) FC Grenchen
1971	(Switzerland) FC Grenchen	(Switzerland) FC Basel	(Switzerland) FC Lausanne-Sport	(Switzerland) FC Biel-Bienne
1972	(Switzerland) Neuchâtel Xamax	(Switzerland) FC Biel-Bienne	(Switzerland) FC Grenchen	(Switzerland) FC Basel
1973	(Switzerland) BSC Young Boys	(Switzerland) FC Biel-Bienne	(Switzerland) Neuchâtel Xamax	(Switzerland) FC Grenchen
1974	Not held			
1975	(Switzerland) BSC Young Boys	(Switzerland) FC Grenchen	(Switzerland) FC Biel-Bienne	(Switzerland) FC La Chaux-de-Fonds
1976	(Switzerland) FC Zurich	(Switzerland) BSC Young Boys	(Switzerland) FC Grenchen	(Switzerland) FC Biel-Bienne
1977	(Switzerland) Neuchâtel Xamax	(Switzerland) FC Basel	(Switzerland) FC Biel-Bienne	(Switzerland) FC Grenchen
1978	(Switzerland) FC Basel	(Switzerland) Neuchâtel Xamax	(Switzerland) FC Grenchen	(Switzerland) FC Biel-Bienne
1979	(Switzerland) FC Basel	(Switzerland) FC Grenchen	(Switzerland) FC La Chaux-de-Fonds	(Switzerland) FC Luzern
1980	(Switzerland) FC Basel	(Switzerland) FC Grenchen	(Switzerland) FC Biel-Bienne	(Switzerland) FC Luzern
1981	(Switzerland) FC Grenchen	(Switzerland) FC Basel	(Switzerland) FC Luzern	(Switzerland) FC Biel-Bienne
1982	(Switzerland) FC Grenchen	(Switzerland) FC Basel	(Switzerland) FC Aarau	(Switzerland) FC Biel-Bienne
1983	(Switzerland) FC Basel	(Switzerland) FC Zurich	(Switzerland) FC Grenchen	(Switzerland) FC Biel-Bienne
1984	(Switzerland) Servette FC	(Switzerland) FC Basel	(Switzerland) FC Biel-Bienne	(Switzerland) FC Grenchen
1985	(Switzerland) FC Grenchen	(Switzerland) FC Basel	(Switzerland) FC Biel-Bienne	(Switzerland) Servette FC
1986	(Switzerland) FC Basel	(Switzerland) Grasshopper Club Zürich	(Switzerland) FC Grenchen	(Switzerland) FC Biel-Bienne
1987	(Switzerland) BSC Young Boys	(Switzerland) FC Grenchen	(Poland) Górnik Zabrze	(Switzerland) FC Basel
1988	(Switzerland) FC Basel	(Switzerland) FC Grenchen	(Czechoslovakia) FC Nitra	(Netherlands) FC Twente
1989	(Socialist Federal Republic of Yugoslavia) FK Partizan	(Switzerland) FC Grenchen	(Switzerland) FC Basel	(Switzerland) FC Zurich
1990	(Poland) Górnik Zabrze	(Switzerland) FC Basel	(Switzerland) FC Lugano	(Switzerland) FC Aarau
1990	Eliminated (with the other two) as the last of group 1: (Switzerland) FC Grenchen			
1990	Eliminated as severed bottom of Group 2: (Switzerland) FC Zurich			
1991	(Germany) 1. FC Köln	(Switzerland) FC Sion	(Poland) Olimpia Poznań	(Switzerland) FC Grenchen
1992	(Switzerland) FC Zurich	(Switzerland) SR Delémont	(Switzerland) FC Basel	(Switzerland) FC Grenchen
1993	(Switzerland) FC Zurich	(Switzerland) FC Basel	(Switzerland) FC Grenchen	(Switzerland) SR Delémont
1994	(Switzerland) FC Zurich	(Switzerland) SR Delémont	(Switzerland) FC Grenchen	(Switzerland) FC Schaffhausen
1995	(Switzerland) FC Aarau	(Switzerland) FC Solothurn	(Switzerland) BSC Young Boys	(Switzerland) FC Grenchen
1996	(Switzerland) FC Grenchen	(Switzerland) FC Solothurn	(Switzerland) SV Lyss	(Switzerland) FC Biel-Bienne
1997	(Switzerland) FC Subingen	(Switzerland) FC Biel-Bienne	(Switzerland) FC Grenchen	(Switzerland) SV Lyss
1998	(Switzerland) FC Solothurn	(Switzerland) SR Delémont	(Switzerland) FC Subingen	(Switzerland) FC Grenchen
1999	(Switzerland) FC Grenchen	(Switzerland) FC Solothurn	(Switzerland) FC Langenthal	(Switzerland) FC Thun
2000	(Switzerland) BSC Young Boys	(Switzerland) Neuchâtel Xamax	(Switzerland) FC Solothurn	(Switzerland) FC Grenchen
2001	(Switzerland) Grasshopper Club Zürich	(Switzerland) BSC Young Boys	(Switzerland) FC Solothurn	(Switzerland) FC Grenchen
2002	(Switzerland) Servette FC	(Switzerland) BSC Young Boys	(Switzerland) FC Aarau	(Switzerland) FC Grenchen
2003	(Switzerland) FC Basel	(Switzerland) BSC Young Boys	(Switzerland) Grasshopper Club Zürich	(Austria) SC Bregenz
2004	(Switzerland) BSC Young Boys	(Germany) 1. FC Kaiserslautern	(Switzerland) FC Basel	(Germany) FC Schalke 04
2005	(Turkey) Trabzonspor	(Germany) 1. FC Kaiserslautern	(Switzerland) BSC Young Boys	(Switzerland) FC Basel
2006	(Switzerland) FC Zürich/FC Basel	(Switzerland) BSC Young Boys	(Germany) Bayer 04 Leverkusen, (Germany) 1. FC Köln (both third)	
2007	(Switzerland) BSC Young Boys	(Switzerland) FC Basel	(Austria) FC Red Bull Salzburg	(Scotland) Celtic F.C.
2008	(Switzerland) FC Basel	(Germany) Borussia Dortmund	(Switzerland) FC Luzern	(Poland) Legia Warsaw
2009	(Ukraine) FC Shakhtar Donetsk	(Switzerland) BSC Young Boys	(Switzerland) FC Basel	(Greece) Panathinaikos F.C.
2010	(Germany) VfB Stuttgart	(Switzerland) BSC Young Boys	(Netherlands) FC Twente	(Spain) Deportivo de La Coruña
2011	(Switzerland) FC Basel	(Switzerland) BSC Young Boys	(England) West Ham United	(Germany) Hertha BSC
2012	Not held			
2013	(Switzerland) FC Basel	(Serbia) Red Star Belgrade	(Germany) Fortuna Düsseldorf	(Switzerland) Grasshopper Club Zürich
2014	Not held			
2015	(Switzerland) FC Biel-Bienne	(Germany) B. Mönchengladbach	(Switzerland) FC Sion	(Austria) A. Salzburg
2016	(Turkey) Galatasaray	(Switzerland) FC Zurich	(Switzerland) BSC Young Boys	(Germany) B. Mönchengladbach
2017	(England) Stoke City	(Switzerland) BSC Young Boys	(Portugal) S.L. Benfica	(Switzerland) Neuchâtel Xamax
2018	(England) Wolverhampton Wanderers	(Netherlands) Feyenoord	(Switzerland) BSC Young Boys	(Switzerland) FC Basel
2019	(Switzerland) BSC Young Boys	(Germany) Eintracht Frankfurt	(England) Crystal Palace	(Switzerland) FC Luzern

== Titles by team ==
Team	Years won	Titles
(Switzerland) FC Basel	1969, 1970, 1978, 1979, 1980, 1983, 1986, 1988, 2003, 2006, 2008, 2011, 2013	13
(Switzerland) BSC Young Boys	1964, 1973, 1975, 1987, 2000, 2004, 2007, 2019	8
(Switzerland) FC Grenchen	1962, 1971, 1981, 1982, 1985, 1996, 1999	7
(Switzerland) FC Zurich	1976, 1992, 1993, 1994, 2006	5
(Switzerland) FC Biel-Bienne	1968, 2015	2
(Switzerland) Neuchâtel Xamax	1972, 1977	2
(Switzerland) Servette FC	1984, 2002	2
(Germany) 1. FC Köln	1991	1
(Switzerland) FC Aarau	1995	1
(Ukraine) FC Shakhtar Donetsk	2009	1
(France) FC Sochaux-Montbéliard	1966	1
(Switzerland) FC Solothurn	1998	1
(Switzerland) FC Subingen	1997	1
(Socialist Federal Republic of Yugoslavia) FK Partizan	1989	1
(Turkey) Galatasaray	2016	1
(Switzerland) Grasshopper Club Zürich	2001	1
(Poland) Górnik Zabrze	1990	1
(England) Ipswich Town	1963	1
(Italy) Lanerossi Vicenza	1965	1
(England) Stoke City	2017	1
(Turkey) Trabzonspor	2005	1
(Germany) VfB Stuttgart	2010	1
(England) Wolverhampton Wanderers	2018	1

== Participation by club ==
Team	Participant
(Switzerland) FC Grenchen	39
(Switzerland) FC Basel	30
(Switzerland) BSC Young Boys	24
(Switzerland) FC Biel-Bienne	23
(Switzerland) FC Zurich	10
(Switzerland) FC Solothurn	6
(Switzerland) Neuchâtel Xamax	6
(Switzerland) FC Luzern	5
(Switzerland) FC Aarau	4
(Switzerland) Grasshopper Club Zürich	4
(Switzerland) SR Delémont	4
(Switzerland) Servette FC	3
(Germany) 1. FC Kaiserslautern	2
(Germany) 1. FC Köln	2
(Germany) Borussia Dortmund	2
(Germany) Borussia Mönchengladbach	2
(Switzerland) FC La Chaux-de-Fonds	2
(Switzerland) FC Lausanne-Sport	2
(Switzerland) FC Sion	2
(France) FC Sochaux-Montbéliard	2
(Switzerland) FC Subingen	2
(Netherlands) FC Twente	2
(Poland) Górnik Zabrze	2
(Italy) Lanerossi Vicenza	2
(Switzerland) SV Lyss	2
(Germany) Bayer 04 Leverkusen	1
(Italy) Calcio Como	1
(Scotland) Celtic F.C.	1
(Belgium) Cercle Brugge K.S.V.	1
(England) Crystal Palace	1
(Spain) Deportivo de La Coruña	1
(Germany) Eintracht Frankfurt	1
(Switzerland) FC Langenthal	1
(Switzerland) FC Lugano	1
(Czechoslovakia) FC Nitra	1
(Austria) FC Red Bull Salzburg	1
(Switzerland) FC Schaffhausen	1
(Germany) FC Schalke 04	1
(Ukraine) FC Shakhtar Donetsk	1
(Switzerland) FC Thun	1
(Netherlands) Feyenoord	1
(Socialist Federal Republic of Yugoslavia) FK Partizan	1
(Germany) Fortuna Düsseldorf	1
(Turkey) Galatasaray	1
(Germany) Hertha BSC	1
(England) Ipswich Town	1
(Germany) Karlsruher SC	1
(Poland) Legia Warsaw	1
(Israel) Maccabi Tel Aviv F.C.	1
(France) Nîmes Olympique	1
(Poland) Olimpia Poznań	1
(Greece) Panathinaikos F.C.	1
(Serbia) Red Star Belgrade	1
(Austria) SC Bregenz	1
(Portugal) S.L. Benfica	1
(Netherlands) Sparta Rotterdam	1
(England) Stoke City	1
SV Austria Salzburg	1
(Turkey) Trabzonspor	1
(Germany) VfB Stuttgart	1
(England) West Ham United	1
(England) Wolverhampton Wanderers	1

== See also ==
- Swiss Super League
- List of football (soccer) competitions
