= Goal of the Month (Germany) =

German football award

Logo of TV-channel Das Erste

The Goal of the Month (German: Tor des Monats) is, like the Goal of the Year, the ARD Goal of the Decade and Goal of the Century, an individual soccer award selected by viewers of Sportschau (German TV channel ARD). Honored are spectacular or important football goals mostly scored in or for Germany.

== Winners ==
(Rows in bold are also Goals of the Year.)

=== 1971 ===
Month	Scorer	For	Against	Competition	Date
March	Gerhard Faltermeier	SSV Jahn Regensburg	VfR Mannheim	Regionalliga Süd	28 March 1971
April	Günter Netzer	Borussia Mönchengladbach	Bayern Munich	Bundesliga	14 April 1971
May	Bernd Nickel	Eintracht Frankfurt	Kickers Offenbach	Bundesliga	29 May 1971
June	Werner Balte	VfL Bochum	SC Tasmania 1900 Berlin	Regionalliga Playoff Round	20 June 1971
July	Peter Braun	SV Fraulautern	FC Homburg	DFB-Pokal	24 July 1971
August	Stan Libuda	FC Schalke 04	MSV Duisburg	Bundesliga	21 August 1971
September	Rolf Rüssmann	FC Schalke 04	Werder Bremen	Bundesliga	18 September 1971
October	**Ulrik le Fevre**	**Borussia Mönchengladbach**	**FC Schalke 04**	**Bundesliga**	**23 October 1971**
November	Alun Evans	FC Liverpool	Bayern Munich	European Cup Winners' Cup	3 November 1971
December	no goal selected				

=== 1972 ===
Month	Scorer	For	Against	Competition	Date
January	Bernd Nickel	Eintracht Frankfurt	Hamburger SV	Bundesliga	22 January 1972
February	Franz Beckenbauer	Bayern Munich	Eintracht Braunschweig	DFB-Pokal	23 February 1972
March	Gerd Müller	Bayern Munich	FC Steaua București	European Cup Winners' Cup	8 March 1972
April	Klaus Scheer; Stan Libuda	FC Schalke 04	Borussia Mönchengladbach	DFB-Pokal	5 April 1972
May	Manfred Kaltz	Hamburger SV	Bayern Munich	Bundesliga	6 May 1972
June	Gerd Müller	Germany	Belgium	Euro 1972	14 June 1972
July	Wolfgang Holoch	Stuttgarter Kickers	SpVgg 07 Ludwigsburg	Süddeutscher Pokal	22 July 1972
August	no goal selected				
September	Uli Hoeneß	Germany Olympic football team	East Germany Olympic football team	1972 Summer Olympics	8 September 1972
October	Reiner Geye	Fortuna Düsseldorf	Borussia Mönchengladbach	Bundesliga	4 October 1972
November	**Günter Netzer; Gerd Müller**	**Germany**	**Switzerland**	**Friendly**	**15 November 1972**
December	no goal selected				

=== 1973 ===
Month	Scorer	For	Against	Competition	Date
January	Hans-Josef Kapellmann	1. FC Köln	VfB Stuttgart	Bundesliga	20 January 1973
February	Jupp Heynckes	Borussia Mönchengladbach	Fortuna Düsseldorf	Bundesliga	17 February 1973
March	**Günter Netzer**	**Borussia Mönchengladbach**	**1. FC Kaiserslautern**	**UEFA Cup**	**20 March 1973**
April	Bernd Nickel	Eintracht Frankfurt	Wuppertaler SV	Bundesliga	28 April 1973
May	Jupp Heynckes	Borussia Mönchengladbach	FC Liverpool	UEFA Cup	23 May 1973
June	Günter Netzer	Borussia Mönchengladbach	1. FC Köln	DFB-Pokal	23 June 1973
July	Alfons Kluger	TSV Burgdorf	VfL Wolfsburg	DFB-Pokal	29 July 1973
August	Alfred Volk	FV Speyer	1. FC Saarbrücken	Regionalliga Südwest	26 August 1973
September	Bernd Rupp	Borussia Mönchengladbach	Werder Bremen	Bundesliga	8 September 1972
October	Bernd Rupp	Borussia Mönchengladbach	Rangers	European Cup Winners' Cup	24 October 1973
November	Erwin Kremers	FC Schalke 04	Eintracht Frankfurt	Bundesliga	3 November 1973
December	no goal selected				

=== 1974 ===
Month	Scorer	For	Against	Competition	Date
January	Johann Ettmayer	VfB Stuttgart	Eintracht Frankfurt	Bundesliga	26 January 1974
February	Klaus Fichtel	FC Schalke 04	Borussia Mönchengladbach	Bundesliga	2 February 1974
March	Franz Beckenbauer	Bayern Munich	MSV Duisburg	UEFA Cup	30 March 1974
April	Herbert Neumann	1. FC Köln	Wuppertaler SV	Bundesliga	27 April 1974
May	no goal selected				
June	no goal selected				
July	no goal selected				
August	Karl-Heinz Struth	SC Fortuna Köln	Rot-Weiß Oberhausen	Bundesliga	25 August 1974
September	Bärbel Wohlleben	TuS Wörrstadt	DJK Eintracht Erle	Deutsche Fußballmeisterschaft	8 September 1974
October	**Erwin Kostedde**	**Kickers Offenbach**	**Borussia Mönchengladbach**	**Bundesliga**	**18 October 1974**
November	Erich Beer	Hertha BSC Berlin	MSV Duisburg	Bundesliga	3 November 1973
December	no goal selected				

=== 1975 ===
Month	Scorer	For	Against	Competition	Date
January	Peter Nogly	Hamburger SV	Borussia Mönchengladbach	Bundesliga	25 January 1975
February	Gerd Zimmermann	Fortuna Düsseldorf	1. FC Kaiserslautern	DFB-Pokal	8 February 1975
March	Jürgen Glowacz	1. FC Köln	Hamburger SV	Bundesliga	26 March 1975
April	Manfred Ritschel	Kickers Offenbach	Eintracht Frankfurt	Bundesliga	19 April 1975
May	Herbert Wimmer	Germany	Netherlands	Friendly	17 May 1975
June	Beverly Ranger	Bonner SC	SSG Bergisch Gladbach	Mittelrheinmeisterschaft	26 June 1975
July	Jupp Heynckes	Borussia Mönchengladbach	FC St. Pauli	Friendly	23 July 1975
August	Peter Hayduk	Hannover 96	Borussia Mönchengladbach	Bundesliga	9 August 1975
September	**Klaus Fischer**	**FC Schalke 04**	**Karlsruher SC**	**Bundesliga**	**27 September 1975**
October	Lorenz-Günther Köstner	Bayer Uerdingen	FC Schalke 04	Bundesliga	25 October 1975
November	Johann Ettmayer	Hamburger SV	Red Star Belgrade	UEFA Cup	5 November 1975
December	no goal selected				

=== 1976 ===
Month	Scorer	For	Against	Competition	Date
January	Hannes Löhr	1. FC Köln	Hertha BSC Berlin	Bundesliga	17 January 1976
February	Berti Vogts	Germany	Malta	UEFA Euro 1976 qualifying	28 February 1976
March	Sigfried Held	Kickers Offenbach	Bayern Munich	Bundesliga	13 March 1976
April	Erich Beer	Germany	Spain	UEFA Euro 1976 qualifying	24 April 1976
May	Uli Hoeneß	Germany	Spain	UEFA Euro 1976 qualifying	22 May 1976
June	Dieter Müller	Germany	Soviet Union	UEFA Euro 1976	20 June 1976
July	Burkhard Steiner	Rot-Weiss Essen (U18)	VfB Stuttgart (U18)	U18 championship	11 July 1976
August	Jürgen Jendrossek	SG Wattenscheid 09	Wuppertaler SV	2. Bundesliga	29 August 1976
September	Gerd Müller	Bayern Munich	Tennis Borussia Berlin	Bundesliga	10 September 1976
October	**Gerd Müller**	**Bayern Munich**	**Banik Ostrava**	**European Cup**	**20 October 1976**
November	Heinz Flohe	Germany	Soviet Union	Friendly	17 November 1976
December	no goal selected				

=== 1977 ===
Month	Scorer	For	Against	Competition	Date
January	Manfred Burgsmüller	Borussia Dortmund	Karlsruher SC	Bundesliga	29 January 1977
February	Lorenz Hilkes	SpVgg Greuther Fürth	FC 08 Homburg	2. Bundesliga Süd	4 February 1977
March	Rainer Bonhof	Borussia Mönchengladbach	Eintracht Frankfurt	Bundesliga	26 March 1977
April	Hans-Jürgen Wittkamp	Borussia Mönchengladbach	Dynamo Kyiv	European Cup	20 April 1977
May	Kurt Jara	MSV Duisburg	1. FC Saarbrücken	Bundesliga	14 May 1977
June	Klaus Fischer	Germany	Mexico	Friendly	15 June 1977
July	Jan Højland Nielsen	1860 Munich	Arminia Bielefeld	DFB-Pokal	30 July 1977
August	Carlos Babington	SG Wattenscheid 09	Fortuna Köln	2. Bundesliga North	5 August 1977
September	Allan Simonsen	Borussia Mönchengladbach	Vasas Budapest	European Cup	14 September 1977
October	Allan Simonsen	Borussia Mönchengladbach	Eintracht Frankfurt	Bundesliga	29 October 1977
November	**Klaus Fischer**	**Germany**	**Switzerland**	**Friendly**	**16 November 1977**
December	no goal selected				

=== 1979 ===
Month	Scorer	For	Against	Competition	Date
January	Jürgen Röber	Werder Bremen	1. FC Nürnberg	Bundesliga	16 December 1978
February	Horst Hrubesch	Hamburger SV	Borussia Mönchengladbach	Bundesliga	4 February 2004
March	Gerd Warken	FC 08 Homburg	SpVgg Bayreuth	2. Bundesliga Süd	25 March 1979
April	Klaus Toppmöller	1. FC Kaiserslautern	Eintracht Frankfurt	Bundesliga	21 April 1979
May	Walter Krause	Kickers Offenbach	TSV 1860 Munich	2. Bundesliga Süd	15 May 1979
June	Wolfgang Seel	Fortuna Düsseldorf	Hertha BSC	DFB-Pokal	24 June 1979
July	Wolfgang Dienelt	Stuttgarter Kickers U-19	1. FC Kaiserslautern U-19	U-19 Meisterschaft	15 July 1979
August	Hans-Peter Briegel	1. FC Kaiserslautern	FC Valencia	Friendly	4 August 1979
September	Karlheinz Kwolek	1. FC Pforzheim	TSV 1860 Munich	DFB-Pokal	29 September 1979
October	Karl-Heinz Rummenigge	Germany	Wales	UEFA Euro 1980 qualifying	17 October 1979
November	**Harald Nickel**	**Borussia Mönchengladbach**	**Inter Milan**	**1979–80 UEFA Cup**	**7 November 1979**
December	no goal selected				

=== 2004 ===
Month	Scorer	For	Against	Competition	Date
January	Lukas Podolski	1. FC Köln	Borussia Mönchengladbach	Bundesliga	31 January 2004
February	Stefan Blank	Alemannia Aachen	Bayern Munich	DFB-Pokal	4 February 2004
March	Normen Elsner	Eisenhüttenstädter FC Stahl	Frankfurter FC Viktoria	NOFV-Oberliga	6 March 2004
April	Mike Hanke	FC Schalke 04	Bayer Leverkusen	Bundesliga	17 April 2004
May	Lukas Podolski	1. FC Köln	Bayern Munich	Bundesliga	1 May 2004
June	no goal selected				
July	Angelos Charisteas	Greece	Portugal	Euro 2004 final	4 July 2004
August	Ahmet Kuru	Eintracht Braunschweig	VfB Lübeck	Regionalliga Nord	11 August 2004
September	Joe Enochs	VfL Osnabrück	Bayern Munich	DFB-Pokal	21 September 2004
October	Lukas Podolski	1. FC Köln	Rot-Weiß Oberhausen	2. Bundesliga	17 October 2004
November	Matthias Lehmann	TSV 1860 Munich	1. FC Saarbrücken	2. Bundesliga	7 November 2004
December	**Klemen Lavrič**	**Dynamo Dresden**	**Rot-Weiß Erfurt**	**2. Bundesliga**	**12 December 2004**

=== 2009 ===
Month	Scorer	For	Against	Competition	Date
January	Sérgio Pinto	Hannover 96	Schalke 04	Bundesliga	31 January 2009
February	Kevin Kuranyi	Schalke 04	Borussia Dortmund	Bundesliga	20 February 2009
March	Michael Ballack	Germany	Liechtenstein	World Cup qualification	4 April 2009
April	**Grafite**	**VfL Wolfsburg**	**Bayern Munich**	**Bundesliga**	**4 April 2009**
May	Florian Trinks	Germany U17	Netherlands U17	European Under-17 Championship	18 May 2009
June	Sandro Wagner	Germany U21	England U21	European Under-21 Championship	29 June 2009
July	Orlando Smeekes	FC Carl Zeiss Jena	SV Wehen Wiesbaden	3. Liga	25 July 2009
August	Bastian Götzfried	Würzburger FV	FC Blau-Weiß Leinach	Landesliga	26 August 2009
September	Melanie Behringer	Germany	England	2009 UEFA Women's Championship	10 September 2009
October	Angelo Barletta	VfL Osnabrück	Borussia Dortmund	DFB-Pokal	27 October 2009
November	Alexander Ende	SC Fortuna Köln	MSV Duisburg II	Oberliga NRW	29 November 2009
December	Eljero Elia	Hamburger SV	1. FC Nürnberg	Bundesliga	12 December 2009

=== 2010 ===
Month	Scorer	For	Against	Competition	Date
January	Arjen Robben	Bayern Munich	Werder Bremen	Bundesliga	23 January 2010
February	Aristide Bancé	Mainz 05	Hertha Berlin	Bundesliga	13 February 2010
March	Arjen Robben	Bayern Munich	Schalke 04	Bundesliga	24 March 2010
April	Arjen Robben	Bayern Munich	Manchester United	Champions League	7 April 2010
May	Claudio Pizzaro	Werder Bremen	Hamburger SV	Bundesliga	8 May 2010
June	Thomas Müller	Germany	Australia	2010 World Cup	13 June 2010
July	Ilian Micanski	1. FC Kaiserslautern	Liverpool F.C.	Friendly	24 July 2010
August	Alexander Thamm	Rot-Weiss Essen	VfB Homberg	NRW-Liga	13 August 2010
September	Sami Allagui	Mainz 05	Bayern Munich	Bundesliga	25 September 2010
October	**Michael Stahl**	**TuS Koblenz**	**Hertha Berlin**	**DFB-Pokal**	**26 October 2010**
November	Sidney Sam	Bayer Leverkusen	1. FC Kaiserslautern	Bundesliga	7 November 2010
December	Torsten Oehrl	FC Augsburg	FSV Frankfurt	2. Bundesliga	11 December 2010

=== 2011 ===
Month	Scorer	For	Against	Competition	Date
January	Paul Kosenkow	BV Cloppenburg	SV Meppen	Oberliga Niedersachsen	28 January 2011
February	Lukas Podolski	1. FC Köln	SC Freiburg	Bundesliga	26 February 2011
March	Marcel Schuhen	1. FC Köln U19	SG Wattenscheid U19	U19 Bundesliga	27 March 2011
April	Julian Schuster	SC Freiburg	1899 Hoffenheim	Bundesliga	9 April 2011
May	Julian Draxler	FC Schalke 04	MSV Duisburg	DFB-Pokal Final	21 May 2011
June	Lukas Scepanik	1. FC Köln U17	Werder Bremen U17	U17 Bundesliga	5 June 2011
July	Sascha Rösler	Fortuna Düsseldorf	VfL Bochum	2. Bundesliga	18 July 2011
August	**Raúl**	**FC Schalke 04**	**1. FC Köln**	**Bundesliga**	**13 August 2011**
September	Silvio	1. FC Union Berlin	FC Ingolstadt 04	2. Bundesliga	11 September 2011
October	Eren Derdiyok	Bayer Leverkusen	VfL Wolfsburg	Bundesliga	1 October 2011
November	Jan Schlaudraff	Hannover 96	Hamburger SV	Bundesliga	26 November 2011
December	Christian Clemens	1. FC Köln	SC Freiburg	Bundesliga	10 December 2011

=== 2012 ===
Month	Scorer	For	Against	Competition	Date
January	Marco Reus	Borussia Mönchengladbach	Bayern Munich	Bundesliga	20 January 2012
February	Shinji Okazaki	VfB Stuttgart	Hannover 96	Bundesliga	19 February 2012
March	Raúl	Schalke 04	1. FC Kaiserslautern	Bundesliga	18 March 2012
April	Raúl	Schalke 04	Hannover 96	Bundesliga	8 April 2012
May	Thomas Müller	Bayern Munich	1. FC Köln	Bundesliga	5 May 2012
June	Marco Reus	Germany	Greece	UEFA Euro 2012	22 June 2012
July	Sebastian Kehl	Borussia Dortmund	1. FC Nürnberg	Friendly	21 July 2012
August	Mohammed Abdellaoue	Hannover 96	Manchester United	Friendly	11 August 2012
September	Marco Reus	Borussia Dortmund	Borussia Mönchengladbach	Bundesliga	29 September 2012
October	Ciprian Marica	Schalke 04	SV Sandhausen	DFB-Pokal	30 October 2012
November	**Zlatan Ibrahimović**	**Sweden**	**England**	**Friendly**	**14 November 2012**
December	Juan Arango	Borussia Mönchengladbach	Mainz 05	Bundesliga	9 December 2012

=== 2013 ===
Month	Scorer	For	Against	Competition	Date
January	Mame Biram Diouf	Hannover 96	Schalke 04	Bundesliga	18 January 2013
February	Arjen Robben	Bayern Munich	Borussia Dortmund	DFB-Pokal	27 February 2013
March	Ivica Olić	VfL Wolfsburg	SC Freiburg	Bundesliga	9 March 2013
April	Bastian Schweinsteiger	Bayern Munich	Eintracht Frankfurt	Bundesliga	6 April 2013
May	Franck Ribéry	Bayern Munich	Borussia Mönchengladbach	Bundesliga	18 May 2013
June	Leonie Maier	Germany	Japan	Friendly	22 June 2012
July	**Raúl; Julian Draxler**	**Schalke 04**	**Al Sadd**	**Friendly**	**27 July 2013**
August	Christian Gentner	VfB Stuttgart	Rijeka	UEFA Europa League	29 August 2013
September	Robert Lewandowski	Borussia Dortmund	SC Freiburg	Bundesliga	28 September 2013
October	André Schürrle	Germany	Sweden	FIFA World Cup qualification	15 October 2013
November	Pascal Köpke	SpVgg Unterhaching	VfB Stuttgart II	3. Liga	9 November 2013
December	Patrick Helmes	1. FC Köln	Dynamo Dresden	2. Bundesliga	13 December 2013

=== 2014 ===
Month	Scorer	For	Against	Competition	Date
January	Thiago	Bayern Munich	VfB Stuttgart	Bundesliga	29 January 2014
February	Klaas-Jan Huntelaar	Schalke 04	Real Madrid	UEFA Champions League	26 February 2014
March	Domi Kumbela	Eintracht Braunschweig	Mainz 05	Bundesliga	25 March 2014
April	Florian Dick	1. FC Kaiserslautern	FSV Frankfurt	2. Bundesliga	20 April 2014
May	Claudio Pizarro	Bayern Munich	Hamburger SV	Bundesliga	3 May 2014
June	André Schürrle	Germany	Algeria	2014 FIFA World Cup	30 June 2014
July	**Mario Götze**	**Germany**	**Argentina**	**2014 FIFA World Cup**	**13 July 2014**
August	Fabian Klos	Arminia Bielefeld	SV Sandhausen	DFB-Pokal	17 August 2014
September	Moritz Stoppelkamp	SC Paderborn	Hannover 96	Bundesliga	20 September 2014
October	Kevin De Bruyne	VfL Wolfsburg	Lille	UEFA Europa League	2 October 2014
November	Dennis Mast	Arminia Bielefeld	SV Wehen Wiesbaden	3. Liga	8 November 2014
December	Bastian Schweinsteiger	Bayern Munich	Mainz 05	Bundesliga	19 December 2014

== Details ==
The Goal of the Month Award and the Goal of the Year Award were incepted in 1971 by the German TV station ARD, back then one of only two public broadcasting agencies in Germany, in its Saturday evening "Sportschau" report in the channel of Das Erste. Each month, the GotM is held, and five especially spectacular, unusual or important goals are shortlisted for the viewers to vote on. Initially in the 1970s, votes were cast per mail, but nowadays votes are commonly cast per telephone or per Internet. The winner receives a golden plaque.

Up to 12 winners (usually less due to breaks in winter and summer) are eligible for the big annual event, the GotY Award. Again, the goal with the most votes wins. Parallel to this, the 10 annual winners may participate in the Goal of the Decade Award, and in 1999, the three Goals of the Decade of the 70s, 80s and 90s squared off for the Goal of the Century Award, see above.

== Records ==
- first GotM winner: Gerhard Faltermeier of Jahn Regensburg
- most GotM: 10, Lukas Podolski, of which 8 were scored within only 27 months (January 2004 to April 2006)
- 7 GotM: Jürgen Klinsmann, between 1986 and 1999
- 6 GotM:
  - Karl-Heinz Rummenigge (1979–1984)
  - Mario Basler (1992–1999)
  - Klaus Fischer (1975–2003)
  - Fischer also holds the record for longest stretch between GotMs: 28 years, scoring in a "veterans match" between Bayern Munich and 1860 Munich on 30 July 2003, at age 53, in the 6th minute of the 0–1 (final 4–4) game, again with his trademark bicycle kick (awarded for the third time).
- 5 GotM:
  - Gerd Müller (1972–1976)
  - Rudi Völler (1987–1990)
- 4 GotM:
  - Günter Netzer, Oliver Bierhoff and others

Teams (as of February 2011):

1. 61 FC Bayern Munich
2. 46 Men's national teams (FIFA team, Under 21 team, Olympic team)
3. 35 Borussia Mönchengladbach
4. 33 1. FC Köln

Most GotM per Team and Year:

- 6 Borussia Mönchengladbach (in 1973)

== Additional notes ==
See also Category:kicker-Torjägerkanone Award winners for the top scorer of each season.
