= Out Front =

Out Front, OutFront, Outfront, or similar terms may refer to:

- Out Front (Booker Little album), a 1961 Booker Little jazz album
- Out Front! (Jaki Byard album), a 1964 Jaki Byard jazz album
- Out Front (newspaper), a Denver LGBT newspaper
- OutFront Minnesota, an LGBT rights organization
- Erin Burnett OutFront (a.k.a. "OutFront"), a CNN TV news magazine
- Outfront Media, formerly CBS Outdoor, an outdoor advertising company
- Outfront, the original title of the Soldiers: Heroes of World War II videogame

== See also ==
- Infront
- Out (disambiguation)
- Front (disambiguation)
