= Jürgen Wilhelm =

German footballer

Personal information
- Date of birth: 2 November 1950 (age 75)
- Place of birth: West Germany
- Position: Forward

Youth career
- SC 09 Oberlahnstein

Senior career*
Years	Team	Apps	(Gls)
1971–1973	Borussia Dortmund	31	(11)
1973–1982	Eintracht Bad Kreuznach		
1982–????	BFV Hassia Bingen		

International career
	West Germany Amateur	1	(0)

Managerial career
- 1995–1996: Eintracht Bad Kreuznach
- 1997–1998: FC Bavaria Ebernburg
- ?–2009: FSV Bretzenheim
- * Club domestic league appearances and goals

Jürgen Wilhelm (born 2 November 1950) is a German former professional footballer who played as a forward for Borussia Dortmund in the Bundesliga.

He is best known for scoring the Goal of the Year in Germany in 1983, while playing for amateur third division side BFV Hassia Bingen.

== Playing career ==
=== Early career ===
As a player for amateur side SC 09 Oberlahnstein, Wilhelm played one game for the German national amateur football team, a 4–2 loss to Luxembourg on 3 March 1971.

=== Borussia Dortmund ===
Wilhelm made his Bundesliga debut on 13 November 1971 in a 4–0 home defeat for Borussia against VfB Stuttgart. He scored his first of three Bundesliga goals against Arminia Bielefeld on 6 May 1972. He scored two more goals against Hannover 96 in the last game of the season but was unable to prevent Borussia's first relegation from the Bundesliga. In total, he made seven appearances for the club in his sole Bundesliga season, scoring three goals.

He stayed for one more season with the club in the tier-two Regionalliga West, before moving on to Eintracht Bad Kreuznach.

=== Eintracht Bad Kreuznach ===
With Eintracht, he won the tier-three Amateurliga Südwest in 1975 and earned promotion to the 2nd Bundesliga Süd. The club lasted for only one season at this level before having to return to the Amateurliga. It was Jürgen Wilhelm's last appearance in professional football.

=== BFV Hassia Bingen ===
In 1982, he joined Oberliga Südwest side Hassia Bingen. On 2 October 1983 he scored a goal for the club against FC Homburg that was voted as the Goal of the Month by German television station ARD. This goal then went on to win the Goal of the Year award.

== Coaching career ==
Wilhelm returned to Eintracht Bad Kreuznach as coach in the 1995–96 season.

In the 1997–98 season, he coached FC Bavaria Ebernburg, which, despite its name, it not a club from Bavaria but rather one from the former Bavarian Palatinate.

He coached the lower-league amateur side FSV Bretzenheim until 2009, when the club was relegated to the Bezirksklasse (VIII) and he was dismissed.

== Career statistics ==
Appearances and goals by club, season and competition
Club	Season	League		
Club	Season	Division	Apps	Goals
Borussia Dortmund	1971–72	Bundesliga	7	3
Borussia Dortmund	1972–73	Regionalliga West	24	8
Eintracht Bad Kreuznach	1975–76	2. Bundesliga Süd	33	14
