= Bärbel Wohlleben =

German footballer (born 1943)

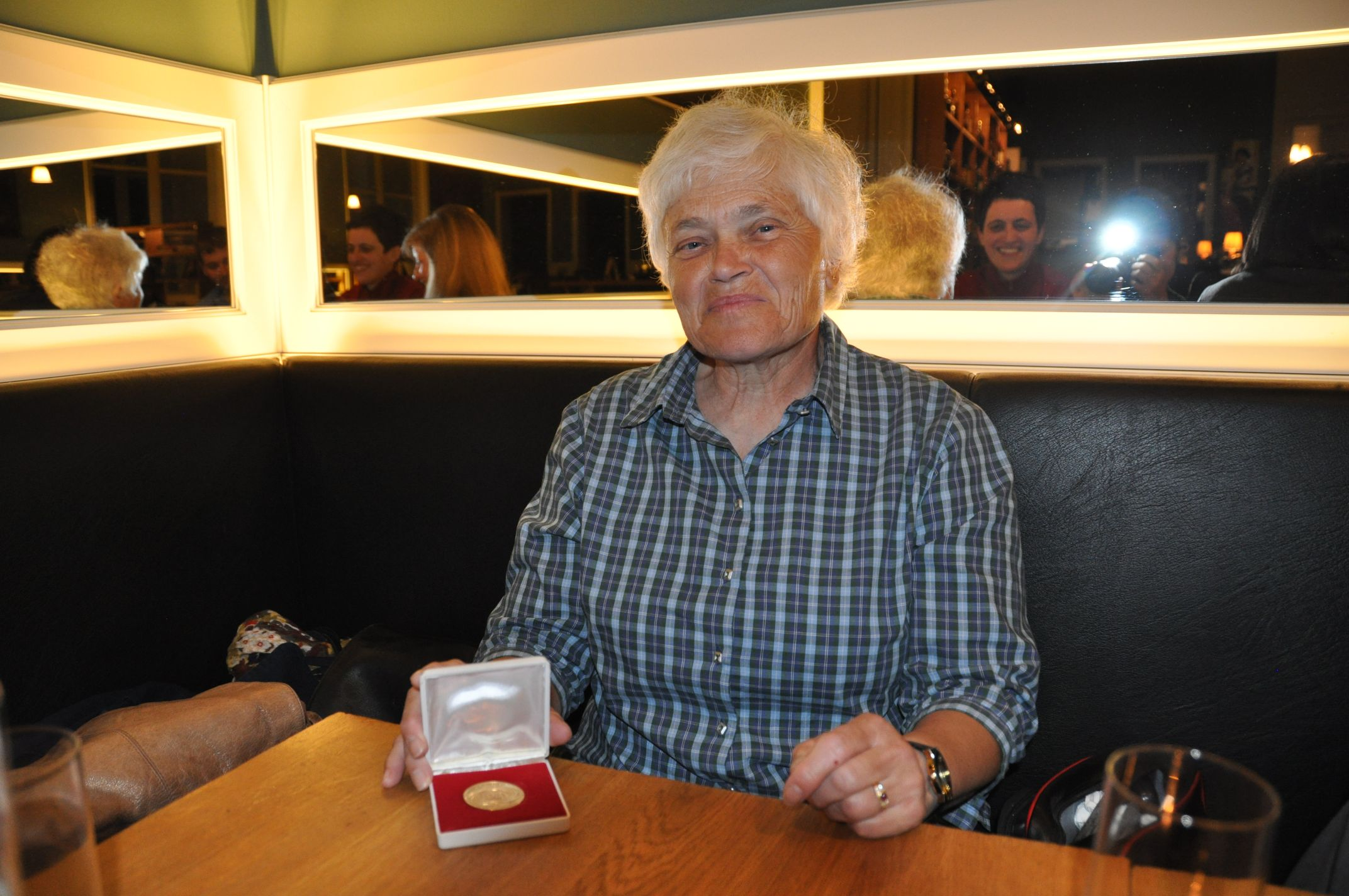
- Wohlleben in 2011

Personal information
- Date of birth: 26 December 1943 (age 82)

Senior career*
Years	Team	Apps	(Gls)
- TuS Wörrstadt
- FSV Frankfurt
- * Club domestic league appearances and goals

Bärbel Wohlleben (born 26 December 1943) is a German former footballer. In 1974, she won the first German women's championship officially organized by the German Football Association with TuS Wörrstadt winning the championship. Wohlleben's goal in a 3–0 victory on 8 September 1974 against DJK Eintracht Erle was voted Goal of the Month by the television viewers of Sportschau it was first to be won by a woman .

== Award ==
2022: Induction into the Hall of Fame of German football

== Literature ==
- Rainer Hennies, Daniel Meuren (Hrsg.): Frauenfußball. Der lange Weg zur Anerkennung. Verlag Die Werkstatt, 2009, ISBN 978-3-89533-639-3.
- Hardy Grüne: Enzyklopädie des deutschen Ligafußballs. Band 2: Bundesliga & Co. 1963 bis heute. 1. Liga, 2. Liga, DDR Oberliga. Zahlen, Bilder, Geschichten. AGON Sportverlag, Kassel 1997, ISBN 3-89609-113-1.
