= Günter Netzer =

German footballer (born 1944)

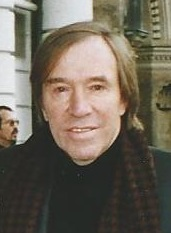
- Netzer in 2005

Personal information
- Full name: Günter Theodor Netzer
- Date of birth: 14 September 1944 (age 82)
- Place of birth: Mönchengladbach, Germany
- Height: 1.78 m (5 ft 10 in)
- Position: Midfielder

Youth career
- 1952–1963: 1. FC Mönchengladbach

Senior career*
Years	Team	Apps	(Gls)
1963–1973	Borussia Mönchengladbach	297	(108)
1973–1976	Real Madrid	85	(9)
1976–1977	Grasshopper Club Zürich	26	(3)
Total		408	(120)

International career
1965–1975	West Germany	37	(6)

Managerial career
- 1978–1986: Hamburger SV (general manager)
Medal record
Men's football
Representing West Germany
FIFA World Cup
Winner	1974 West Germany
UEFA European Championship
Winner	1972 Belgium
- * Club domestic league appearances and goals

Günter Theodor Netzer (born 14 September 1944) is a German former professional football player, executive and pundit. He achieved great success in Germany with Borussia Mönchengladbach in the early 1970s and, after moving to Spain in 1973, with Real Madrid. A technically gifted playmaker, Netzer played as an attacking midfielder or as a deep-lying playmaker and is considered one of the greatest midfielders and passers in the game's history. He was voted German Footballer of the Year twice, in 1972 and 1973.

Netzer was the general manager for Hamburger SV during much of the team's golden period from the late 1970s through the early 1980s, when the club won three league titles and the 1983 European Cup.

== Club career ==
=== Borussia Mönchengladbach ===
Netzer, the son of a greengrocer, played for 1. FC Mönchengladbach from the age of eight until 19 before switching to city rivals Borussia Mönchengladbach in 1963. He scored on his debut against Rot-Weiß Oberhausen, and quickly established himself as a first team regular, helping the club win promotion to the Bundesliga in 1965.

Netzer played for Borussia, managed by Hennes Weisweiler, until 1973. In his 230 Bundesliga games for them, he scored 82 goals. The era also saw one of the most competitive rivalries in the Bundesliga's history between Borussia Mönchengladbach and Bayern Munich. Bayern Munich had stars Franz Beckenbauer, Gerd Müller, Hans-Georg Schwarzenbeck, Paul Breitner and Sepp Maier on their side while Mönchengladbach had Berti Vogts, Herbert Wimmer, Jupp Heynckes, Rainer Bonhof and Netzer. When they achieved their first successes the average age of both teams was 21.

With Borussia Mönchengladbach he won the Bundesliga in 1970 and 1971 (the first Bundesliga club to win back-to-back championships), and the DFB-Pokal in 1973. The final was a famous match against 1. FC Köln in which he started as a sub – it is said because he had told his manager of his intention to move to Spain after the season – and went onto the pitch during extra time on his own authority, simply telling the coach "I'll go and play now" whilst removing his tracksuit. He then went on to score the winning goal three minutes later, with only his second possession of the ball. By then Netzer had achieved a certain pop star-like popularity because of his good looks, flowing blond hair, and perceived rebel personality and playboy lifestyle. Netzer was voted German Footballer of the Year twice, in 1972 and 1973, by the country's football journalists.

=== Real Madrid ===
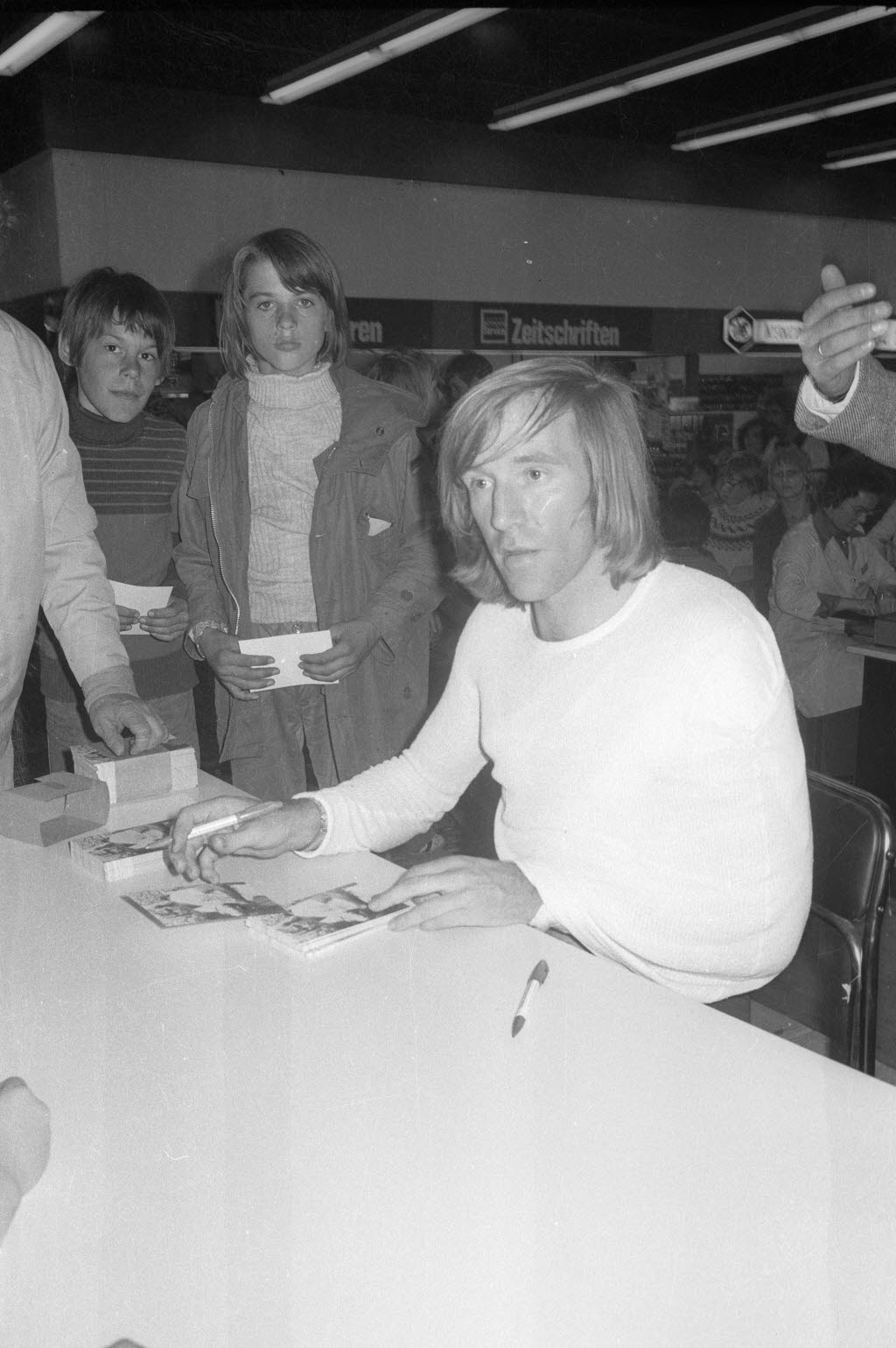
Netzer signing autographs in 1975

When Johan Cruyff joined FC Barcelona in 1973, Real Madrid needed to respond in kind. So Santiago Bernabéu signed him and Paul Breitner a year later. Netzer was the first German player to play for the club. He played in Spain until 1976, winning La Liga in 1975 and 1976 and the Copa del Rey in 1974 and 1975. After his three-year spell in the Spanish capital, Netzer joined Grasshopper Club Zürich, where in 1977 he finished his playing career.

== International career ==
Netzer made his debut for the West Germany national team in October 1965 in a friendly against Austria. He represented West Germany 37 times from 1965 to 1975, scoring six goals (some from the penalty spot) and playing a vital role in the country's victory at UEFA Euro 1972. He also appeared briefly (for 21 minutes against East Germany) in the 1974 FIFA World Cup, during which time the only goal of the match was scored against his team. At the tournament, Wolfgang Overath was the central figure in Germany's midfield; Netzer, despite being friends with Overath, considered the pair as not being able to play together effectively. Although he did not play in the final, Netzer is nonetheless considered the first World Cup winner to, at the time of winning, play for a club that was based outside his country.

== Style of play ==
A classic playmaker known for his technique and passing ability, Netzer was capable of playing either as an attacking midfielder, or as a deep-lying playmaker, is considered one of the greatest midfielders and passers of all time. Normally positioned as a midfielder in front of the defence, Netzer often dropped back between the back line. From there, he organised the game from deep and served his team-mates with precise long balls. During his time at Mönchengladbach, Netzer was also deployed as a libero at times. Apart from his superior ball skills, his natural authority made him the undisputed leader of his team. As a player for Borussia Mönchengladbach, he enjoyed a lot of freedom from the management and the coach Hennes Weisweiler, even off the pitch. On the field the way he orchestrated the team's midfield play earned him the nickname 'Karajan', after the conductor Herbert von Karajan.

== Managerial career ==
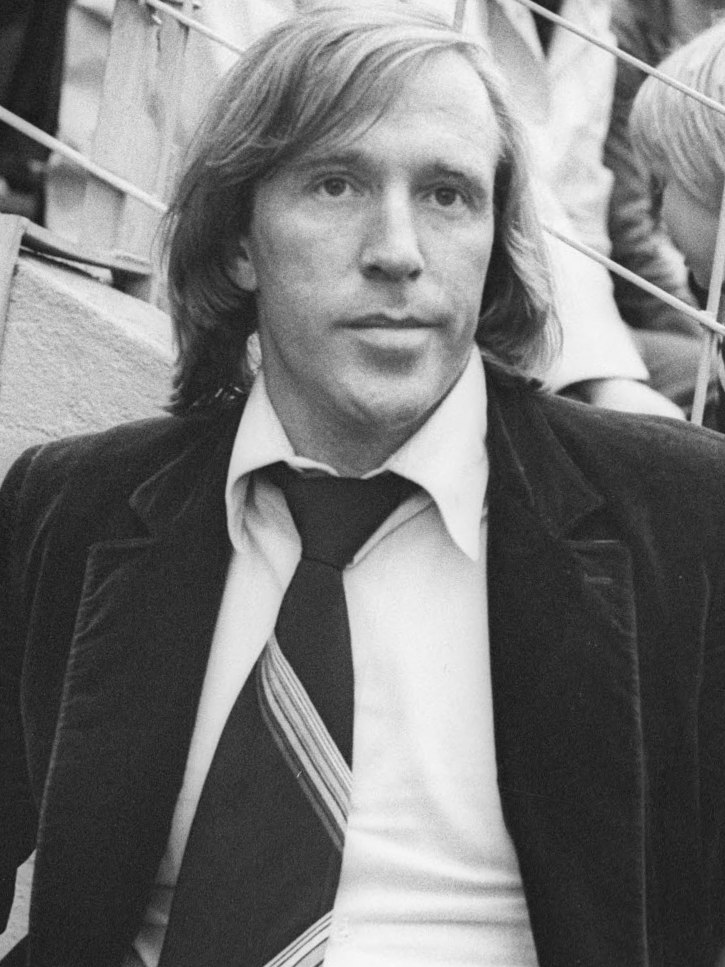
Netzer as general manager of Hamburg in 1979.

After his career as a player Netzer offered to publish Hamburger SV's stadium magazine. The president, Paul Benthien, agreed on the condition that he also became general manager. Netzer spent eight successful years in Hamburg, during which time he completely transformed Hamburg's team, managed to sign famous coaches like Branko Zebec and later Ernst Happel, and led the club to three Bundesliga titles (1979, 1982, 1983). In 1983, Hamburg reached the final of the European Cup. With Horst Hrubesch, Felix Magath and Manfred Kaltz, Hamburg pulled off one of the biggest upsets in European Cup history by beating a Juventus side packed with Italian players who had won the World Cup a year earlier and two star import players – Michel Platini and Zbigniew Boniek. The years with Günter Netzer are today considered the most successful period in Hamburg's history.

== Media businessman and pundit ==
After the end of his playing career, Netzer founded an advertising agency in Zürich, Switzerland, where he continues to live. He also deals in TV rights and is currently executive director of the Swiss sports rights managing agency Infront Sports & Media AG, a partner company of the German Football Association.

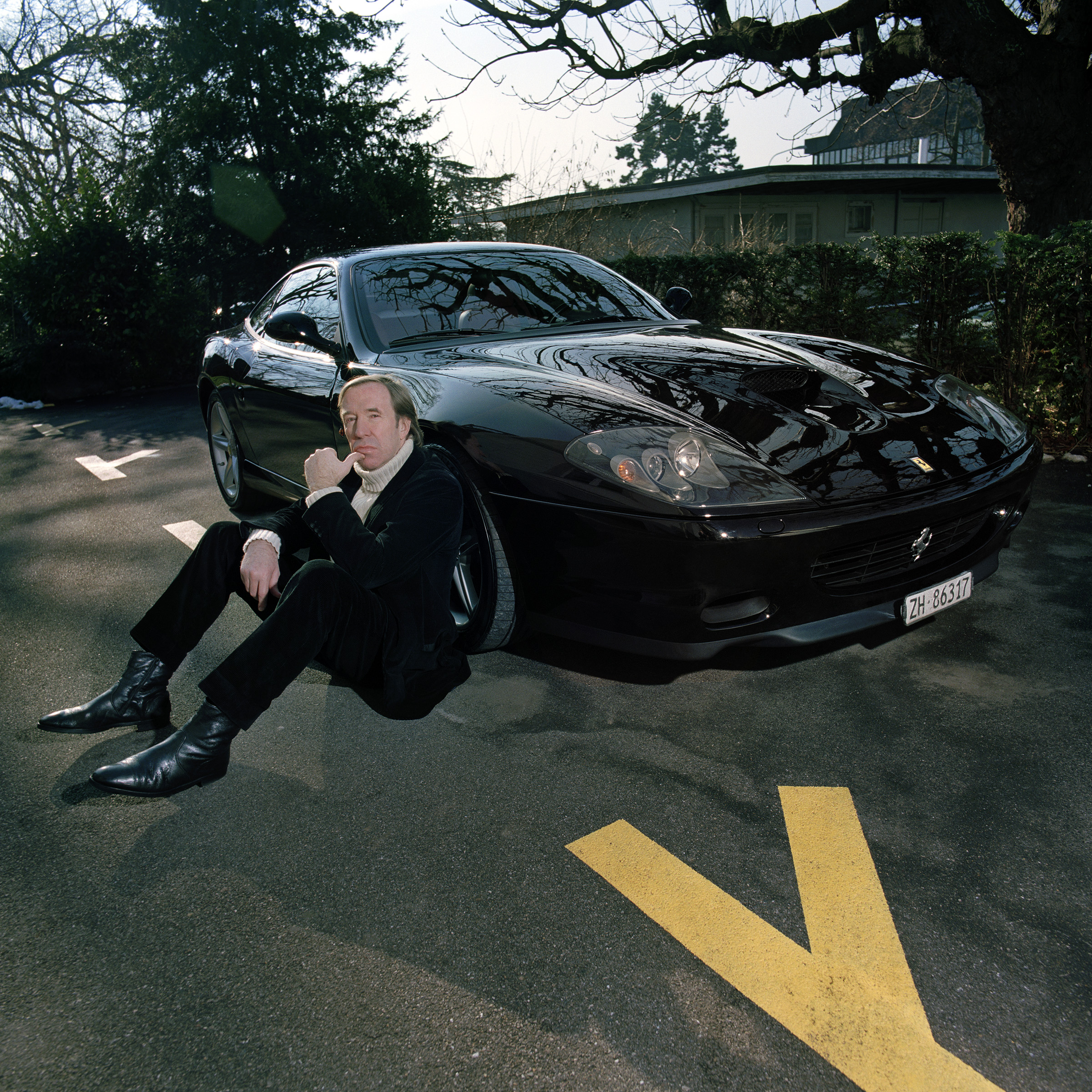
Netzer photographed by Oliver Mark in Zürich, 2007.

Apart from that, Netzer worked as a reporter and football pundit on TV. For his work with the German TV channel ARD and host Gerhard Delling, commenting on games of the Germany national team, both received the prestigious Adolf Grimme Award in 2000.

Despite their frequent arguments on TV, which they have developed into a kind of iconic skit, Netzer and Delling are said to be close friends. Netzer was Delling's best man at his wedding in May 2003.

It was the duo's harsh criticism of the Germany national side's poor performance that triggered Rudi Völler's famous eruption on 6 September 2003, immediately after the international match against Iceland. The then Bundestrainer (manager) harshly criticized Netzer, some considered it abusively, in a live interview after the goalless draw.

Following the 2010 FIFA World Cup in South Africa, Netzer announced he was leaving the ARD after 13 years.

Netzer is married and has one daughter. Having lived in Switzerland since the end of his football career, he has also acquired Swiss citizenship.

== Career statistics ==
Appearances and goals by national team and year
National team	Year	Apps	Goals
Germany	1965	2	0
Germany	1966	2	0
Germany	1967	2	0
Germany	1968	7	0
Germany	1970	3	1
Germany	1971	8	3
Germany	1972	7	2
Germany	1973	1	0
Germany	1974	3	0
Germany	1975	2	0
Total		37	6

Scores and results list Germany's goal tally first, score column indicates score after each Netzer goal.

List of international goals scored by Günter Netzer
No.	Date	Venue	Opponent	Score	Result	Competition
1	22 November 1970	Athens, Greece	Greece	1–0	3–1	Friendly
2	12 June 1971	Karlsruhe, Germany	Albania	1–0	2–0	UEFA Euro 1972 qualifying
3	22 June 1971	Oslo, Norway	Norway	7–0	7–1	Friendly
4	8 September 1971	Hanover, Germany	Mexico	4–0	5–0	Friendly
5	29 April 1972	London, England	England	2–1	3–1	UEFA Euro 1972 qualifying
6	15 November 1972	Düsseldorf, Germany	Switzerland	4–0	5–1	Friendly

== Honours ==
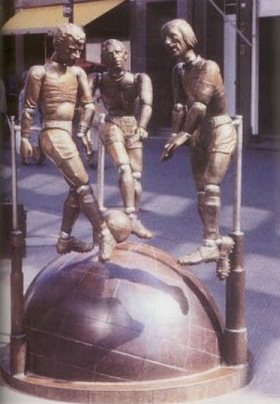
Bronze monument depicting Herbert Wimmer, Berti Vogts and Günter Netzer in Mönchengladbach, unveiled in 1981.

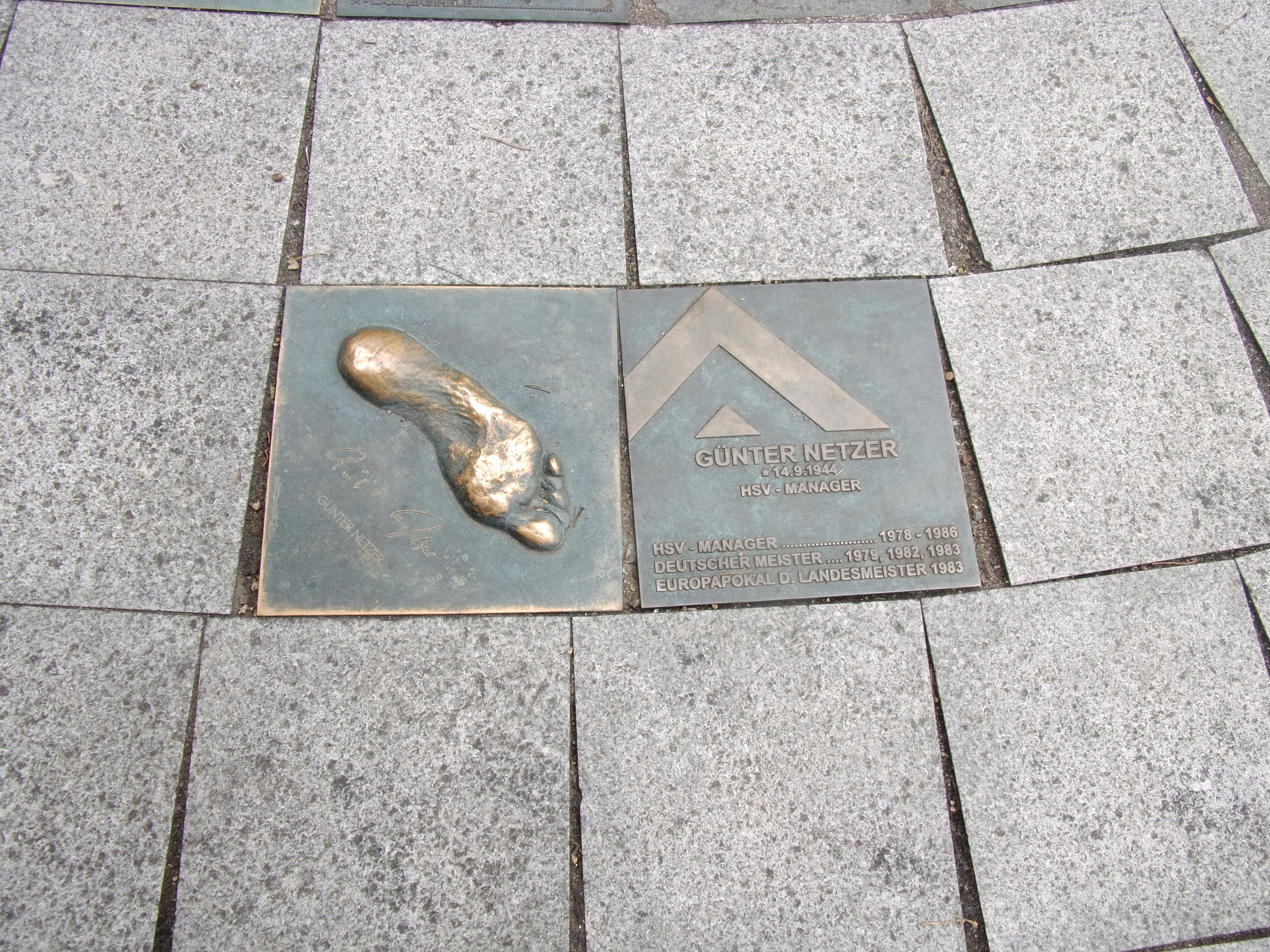
Commemorative plaque honoring Günter Netzer, HSV's general manager from 1978 to 1986, on the HSV Walk of Fame at Volksparkstadion in Hamburg.

=== As player ===
Borussia Mönchengladbach

- Bundesliga: 1969–70, 1970–71
- DFB-Pokal: 1972–73
- UEFA Cup runner-up: 1972–73

Real Madrid

- La Liga: 1974–75, 1975–76
- Copa del Rey: 1973–74, 1974–75

West Germany

- UEFA European Championship: 1972
- FIFA World Cup: 1974

Individual

- kicker Bundesliga Team of the Season: 1965–66, 1966–67, 1967–68, 1968–69, 1969–70, 1970–71, 1971–72
- Goal of the Year (Germany): 1971, 1972
- Footballer of the Year (Germany): 1972, 1973
- UEFA European Championship Team of the Tournament: 1972
- UEFA European Championship top assist provider: 1972
- Ballon d'Or runner-up: 1972 (Note: Shared with Gerd Müller)
- World XI: 1972, 1973, 1975
- FUWO European Team of the Season: 1972
- Sport Ideal European XI: 1972, 1973
- World Soccer: The Greatest Players of the 20th century (75th place)
- Member of Germany's Sports Hall of Fame

=== As general manager ===
Hamburger SV

- Bundesliga: 1978–79, 1981–82, 1982–83
- European Cup: 1982–83
- Intercontinental Cup runner-up: 1983

== See also ==
- List of Germany international footballers
- List of foreign La Liga players
