= 1981–82 FC Basel season =

FC Basel
1981–82 season
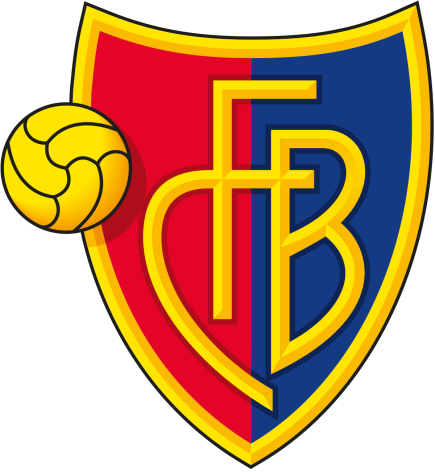
- Chairman: Pierre Jacques Lieblich
- Manager: Helmut Benthaus
- Ground: St. Jakob Stadium, Basel
- Nationalliga A: 8th of 16
- Swiss Cup: Runners-up
- Swiss League Cup: Quarter-final
- Coppa delle Alpi: Winners
- Top goalscorer: League: Martin Jeitziner (8); Maissen (8); All: Maissen (13)
- Highest home attendance: 10,500 on 28 March 1982 vs Servette
- Lowest home attendance: 3,000 on 24 April 1982 vs Sion
- Average home league attendance: 6,126

The Fussball Club Basel 1893 1981–82 season was their 88th season since the club was founded. It was their 36th consecutive season in the top flight of Swiss football after they won promotion during the season 1945–46. They played their home games in the St. Jakob Stadium. Pierre Jacques Lieblich was club chairman for the second year running.

== Overview ==
=== Pre-season ===
Helmut Benthaus was first-team manager for the seventeenth consecutive season. During the off-season four players left the squad, Ernst Schleiffer moved on to Grenchen, Peter Marti to Aarau, Markus Tanner to Luzern and Joseph Küttel moved on to Lugano. During the season Hansruedi Schär was loaned out to Nordstern Basel and during the winter break Detlev Lauscher moved on to Luzern. In the other direction goalkeeper Walter Eichenberger joined from Young Boys and defender Bruno Graf joined from Chiasso. Basel also signed two youngsters, Alfred Lüthi from FC Subingen and Beat Sutter joined from local club FC Gelterkinden. The biggest transfer this summer was that of former West German international Harald Nickel from Borussia Mönchengladbach.

Basel played a total of 54 games in their 1981–82 season. 30 matches were played in the domestic league, six in the Swiss Cup, three in the Swiss League Cup, five in the Cup of the Alps and 10 were friendly matches. The team scored a total of 101 goals and conceded 80. Of their 10 test games, six were won and four ended with a defeat. Five of these games were played at home in St. Jakob Stadium and five were played away.

=== Domestic league ===
Basel played in the 1981–82 Nationalliga A. The league championship format was expanded from the 1980–81 season to include sixteen teams and the last two teams were to be relegated. Basel ended the season in eighth position, 21 points behind Grasshopper Club who became champions. In their 30 league games Basel won eleven, drew six and lost thirteen matches, which meant that the totaled 28 points. They scored 47 goals, conceding 51. Local rivals Nordstern Basel and Chiasso finished in the last two slots and suffered relegation.

=== Swiss Cup ===
Basel entered into the Swiss Cup in the round of 64. Here they were drawn away against Sursee and on 26 September they won the match, 9–1. In the round of 32 they were drawn away against Bellinzona and this match was on 31 October and Basel won, 1–0. In the round of 16 they were drawn away from home against Aarau on 30 March 1982 and this match was won, 3–2. In the quarterfinal Basel played at home against Lausanne-Sport and this ended with a 2–1 victory. The semi-final was played on 4 May in the St. Jakob Stadium against SR Delémont and Basel won 3–0. In the Final, played in the Wankdorf Stadium, was against Sion. After a free kick on the sideline, in the 21st minute, a headed goal from Alain Balet secured Sion the trophy.

=== Swiss League Cup ===
In first round of the Swiss League Cup Basel were also drawn at home against Young Boys and a 1–0 victory took them to the next round. Here they played away against Grenchen and came away with a 2–1 victory. In the quarterfinal Basel played on the Stadion Brügglifeld but were eliminated by Aarau.

=== Coppa delle Alpi ===
Basel were not qualified to play any of the European competitions, but they did enter the Coppa delle Alpi. They played together with Lausanne-Sport in Group A against Bordeaux and Bastia. Basel won the group and continued to the final, which was played on 29 September 1981 in Basel against Sochaux. They game ended 2–2 after extra time and Basel won on penalties.

== Players ==
The following is the list of the Basel first team squad during the season 1981–92. The list includes players that were in the squad the day the Nationalliga A season started on 15 August 1981 but subsequently left the club after that date.

Note: Flags indicate national team as defined under FIFA eligibility rules; some limited exceptions apply. Players may hold more than one non-FIFA nationality.

No.	Pos.	Nation	Player
1	GK	SUI	Walter Eichenberger (from Young Boys)
1	GK	SUI	Hans Küng
2	DF	SUI	Walter Geisser
3	DF	FRA	Serge Duvernois
4	DF	SUI	Bruno Graf (from Chiasso)
5	DF	SUI	René Hasler
6	MF	SUI	Otto Demarmels
7	FW	SUI	Beat Sutter (from FC Gelterkinden)
8	MF	SUI	Erni Maissen
9	FW	GER	Harald Nickel (from Borussia Mönchengladbach)
10	MF	SUI	Arthur von Wartburg
11	FW	GER	Detlev Lauscher (mid-season to Luzern)

No.	Pos.	Nation	Player
12	DF	SUI	Jean-Pierre Maradan
13	DF	SUI	Alfred Lüthi (from FC Subingen)
14	DF	SUI	Jörg Stohler
15	MF	SUI	Martin Mullis
16	MF	SUI	Hansruedi Schär (loan to Nordstern Basel)
17	DF	FRA	Serge Gaisser
18	DF	SUI	Stefano Ceccaroni
19	MF	SUI	René Zingg
20	MF	SUI	Martin Jeitziner
22	GK	SUI	Hans Müller
—	GK	SUI	Thomas Paul (reserves)

Players who left the squad

Note: Flags indicate national team as defined under FIFA eligibility rules; some limited exceptions apply. Players may hold more than one non-FIFA nationality.

No.	Pos.	Nation	Player
—	MF	SUI	Ernst Schleiffer (to Grenchen)
—	FW	SUI	Peter Marti (to Aarau)

No.	Pos.	Nation	Player
—	MF	SUI	Markus Tanner (to Luzern)
—	FW	SUI	Joseph Küttel (to Lugano)

== Results ==
Legend

Win Draw Loss Postponed

=== Friendly matches ===
==== Pre- and mid-season ====
22 July 1981 Pre-season	Karlsruher SC (Germany)	1–4	(Switzerland) Basel	Schopfheim
18:30	Wiesner 13' (1:0)	FCB summary	35' (1:1) Gaisser; 43' (1:2) Nickel; 63' (1:3) Gaisser; 75' (1:4) von Wartburg	Attendance: 4,000; Referee: (Germany) Ehrenfried Grether

25 July 1981 Uhrencup semi-final	Basel (Switzerland)	4–0	(Switzerland) Biel-Bienne	Stadion Brühl, Grenchen
	Nickel 12' (1:0); Lauscher 37' (2:0); Demarmels 45' (3:0); Gaisser 87' (4:0)	FCB summary		Attendance: 1,500; Referee: (Switzerland) Roland Chapuis, (Courtételle)
Note: The Uhrencup is a former club football tournament that was held annually in Grenchen in Switzerland.

7 August 1981 Pre-season	Basel (Switzerland)	5–0	(Switzerland) Young Boys	Wintersried, Brunnen
	Lauscher 20' (1:0); Gaisser 27' (2:0); Lauscher 28' (3:0); Stohler 83' (4:0); Sutter 85' (5:0)	FCB summary		Attendance: 1,400; Referee: (Switzerland)
Note: Exhibition game for the 50th anniversary of FC Brunnen.

11 August 1981 Uhrencup final	Grenchen (Switzerland)	1–1 (5–4 p)	(Switzerland) Basel	Stadion Brühl, Grenchen
	Fleury 37' (1:1)	FCB summary	36' (0:1) Stohler; (penalty missed) 77′ Nickel	Attendance: 4,300; Referee: (Switzerland) Alfred Heinis (Ammannsegg, Biberist)
	Penalties
	Wirth (penalty scored); Nüssing (penalty scored); Fleury (penalty scored); Nussbaumer (penalty scored); Radakovic (penalty scored)		(penalty scored) Nickel; (penalty scored) Stohler; (penalty scored) Maradan; (penalty scored) von Wartburg; (penalty missed) Mullis
Note: The Uhrencup is a former club football tournament that was held annually in Grenchen in Switzerland.

9 October 1981 Mid-season	Basel (Switzerland)	0–5	(Germany) 1. FC Köln	St. Jakob Stadium, Basel
20:00		FCB summary	49' (0:1) Fischer; 52' (0:2) Woodcock; 55' (0:3) Littbarski; 75' (0:4) Woodcock; 82' (0:5) Woodcock	Attendance: 5,000; Referee: (Switzerland) Georges Sandoz (Corcelles-Cormondrèche, Neuchâtel)

13 October 1981 Mid-season	Monthey (Switzerland)	1–2	(Switzerland) Basel	Stade Philippe Pottier, Monthey
	Schürmann 44' (1:1)	FCB summary	14' (0:1) Maissen; 77' (1:2) Stohler	Attendance: 400; Referee: (Switzerland) Othmar Winter, (Martigny)

==== Winter break ====
13 February 1982 Winter break	FC Mendrisiostar	1–2	Basel	Centro Sportivo Comunale, Mendrisio
13:45	Venzi 24' (1:0); Ambroggi (yellow card) 51'	FCB summary	75' (1:1) Ceccaroni; 77' (1:2) Maissen	Attendance: 400; Referee: (Switzerland) Francesco Bianchi (Chiasso)

14 February 1982 Winter break	Basel	4–0	Winterthur	Centro Sportivo Comunale, Mendrisio
	Ceccaroni 4' (1:0); Ceccaroni 11' (2:0); Ceccaroni 31' (3:0); Sutter 51' (4:0)	FCB summary	(penalty missed) 88′ Rapolder	Attendance: 500; Referee: (Switzerland) Papa
Note: 88th minute goalkeeper Hans Müller held the penalty kick from Uwe Rapolder.

17 February 1982 Winter break	Basel	0–2	Juventus	St. Jakob Stadium, Basel
		FCB summary	1' (0:1) Virdis; 68' (0:2) Bonini	Attendance: 12,000; Referee: (Switzerland) Jean-Marie Macheret, (Rueyres-St-Laurent)

27 February 1982 Winter break	Basel	0–5	Luzern	St. Jakob Stadium, Basel
		FCB summary	10' (0:1) Bachmann; 36' (0:2) Schär; 48' (0:3) Tanner; 53' (0:4) Fischer; 84' (0:5) Fischer	Referee: (Switzerland) Weisskopf

=== Nationalliga A ===
==== Nationalliga Matches ====
15 August 1981 Round 1	Basel	2–0	Aarau	St. Jakob Stadium, Basel
20:00	Graf (yellow card) 56'; Maissen 71' (1:0) (Fritsch) 83' (o.g. 2:0)	FCB summary FCA summary	(yellow card) 10' (yellow-red card) 23' Kaltaveridis	Attendance: 8,500; Referee: (Switzerland) André Daina (Éclépens)
Note: Before the match Arthur von Wartburg was honored for his 200th game with FCB in the second-to-last round of the 80/81 season.

22 August 1981 Round 2	Vevey-Sports	0–1	Basel	Stade de Copet, Vevey
20:00		FCB summary	(yellow card) 35' Graf; 58' (0:1) Stohler	Attendance: 4,400; Referee: (Switzerland) Freddy Philippoz (Sion)

29 August 1981 Round 3	Basel	1–0	Bulle	St. Jakob Stadium, Basel
20:00	Lüthi 86' (1:0)	FCB summary	(yellow card) 88' Bapst; (yellow card) 89' Mantoan	Attendance: 6,500; Referee: (Switzerland) Alfred Heinis (Ammannsegg, Biberist)

5 September 1981 Round 4	Chiasso	0–0	Basel	Stadio Comunale Riva IV, Chiasso
20:30	Gianola (yellow card) 75'	FCB summary	(yellow card) 68' Nickel	Attendance: 2,500; Referee: (Switzerland) Philippe Mercier (Pully)
Note: The game started a quarter of an hour late because the floodlights partially failed.

12 September 1981 Round 5	Basel	3–0	Nordstern Basel	St. Jakob Stadium, Basel
20:00	Nickel 15' (1:0); Nickel 40' (2:0); Nickel 86' (pen. 3:0)	FCB summary	(yellow card) Moser	Attendance: 6,000; Referee: (Switzerland) Rudolf Renggli (Stans and Luzern)
Note: Corners: 7:7.

19 September 1981 Round 6	Servette	1–0	Basel	Charmilles Stadium, Geneva
20:00	Pleimelding 37' (1:0)	FCB summary	(yellow card) 40' Mullis; (yellow card) 89' Maissen	Attendance: 16,000; Referee: (Switzerland) Renzo Peduzzi (Roveredo)

22 September 1981 Round 7	Basel	1–1	Young Boys	St. Jakob Stadium, Basel
20:00	Geisser (yellow card) 84'; Nickel 87' (1:1); Graf (yellow card) 52' (yellow-red card) 90'	FCB summary	38' (0:1) R. Müller; (yellow card) 74' (yellow-red card) 80' Bauer	Attendance: 10,000; Referee: (Switzerland) Georges Sandoz (Corcelles-Cormondrèche, Neuchâtel)

4 October 1981 Round 8	Zürich	3–1	Basel	Letzigrund, Zürich
14:30	Seiler 12' (1:0) (Maradan) 44' (o.g. 2:0); Landolt (yellow card) 81'; Seiler 89' (3:1)	FCZ summary FCB summary	(yellow card) 5' Gaisser; 49' (2:1) Jeitziner; (yellow card) 55' Sutter	Attendance: 14,500; Referee: (Switzerland) Ulrich Nyffenegger (Nidau)

17 October 1981 Round 9	Basel	1–3	Lausanne-Sport	St. Jakob Stadium, Basel
20:00	Jeitziner 70' (1:2)	FCB summary	31' (0:1) Tachet; 61' (pen. 0:2) Tachett; 83' (1:3) Tachet	Attendance: 4,500; Referee: (Switzerland) Bruno Galler (Kirchdorf, Bern)

24 October 1980 Round 10	Sion	3–2	Basel	Stade Tourbillon, Sion
20:15	Cucinotta 4' (1:0); Brigger 72' (2:2); Richard 79' (pen. 3:2); Richard (yellow card)	FCB summary	17' (1:1) Sutter; 65' (1:2) Maissen; (yellow card) Graf; (yellow card) Demarmels	Attendance: 3,600; Referee: (Switzerland) Rudolf Affolter

7 November 1981 Round 11	Basel	1–1	Xamax	St. Jakob Stadium, Basel
17:30	Stohler 84' (1:1)	FCB summary	18' (0:1) Küffer	Attendance: 3,700; Referee: (Switzerland) Alfred Heinis (Ammannsegg, Biberist)

15 November 1981 Round 12	Bellinzona	1–1	Basel	Stadio Comunale Bellinzona, Bellinzona
14:45	Maccini 10' (1:0); Duvernois (yellow card) 58'	FCB summary	88' (1:1) Stohler	Attendance: 2,700; Referee: (Switzerland) Bruno Galler (Kirchdorf, Bern)

22 November 1981 Round 13	Basel	5–2	St. Gallen	St. Jakob Stadium, Basel
20:00	Sutter 6' (1:0) von Wartburg 39' (2:1); Sutter 56' (3:1); Sutter 59' (4:1); Mullis 62' (5:1)	FCB summary	19' (1:1) Gorgoń; 90' (5:2) Sengör	Attendance: 5,000; Referee: (Switzerland) Roland Chapuis, (Courtételle)

29 November 1981 Round 14	Grasshopper Club	3–0	Basel	Hardturm, Zürich
14:30	Sulser 34' (1:0); Heinz Hermann 47' (2:0); Sulser 77' (3:0)	FCB summary		Attendance: 6,100; Referee: (Switzerland) Willy Hänni, (Cugy)

6 December 1981 Round 15	Luzern	2–2	Basel	Stadion Allmend, Luzern
14:30	Tanner 29' (1:2); Risi 85' (2:2)	FCB summary	10' (0:1) Demarmels; 12' (0:2) Maissen	Attendance: 9,300; Referee: (Switzerland) Georges Sandoz (Corcelles-Cormondrèche, Neuchâtel)

Round 16	Bulle	P–P	Basel	Stade de Bouleyres, Bulle

7 March 1982 Round 17	Basel	3–0	Chiasso	St. Jakob Stadium, Basel
15:00	Jeitziner 5' (1:0); Nickel 32' (2:0); Jeitziner 86' (3:0); Jeitziner (yellow card)	FCB summary	(yellow card) Manzoni	Attendance: 3,500; Referee: (Switzerland) Roland Chapuis, (Courtételle)

10 March 1982 Round 16	Bulle	1–0	Basel	Stade de Bouleyres, Bulle
20:00	Bapst 77' (1:0)	FCB summary	(yellow card) 86' Maradan	Attendance: 1,500; Referee: (Switzerland) Gottlieb Barmettler Luzern

14 March 1982 Round 18	Nordstern Basel	3–4	Basel	Stadion Rankhof, Basel
14:30	Schär 43' (1:2); Grimm 58' (2:2); Holenstein 88' (3:4); Sprunger (yellow card)	FCB summary	19' (0:1) Demarmels; 40' (0:2) Maissen; 84' (2:3) Ceccaroni; 88' (2:4) Ceccaroni; (yellow card) Demarmels	Attendance: 6,100; Referee: (Switzerland) Jean-Marie Macheret, (Rueyres-St-Laurent)

28 March 1982 Round 19	Basel	0–1	Servette	St. Jakob Stadium, Basel
15:00		FCB summary	83' (0:1) Schnyder	Attendance: 10,500; Referee: (Switzerland) Ulrich Nyffenegger (Nidau)
Note: Corners: 7:7

31 March 1982 Round 20	Young Boys	3–1	Basel	Wankdorf Stadium, Bern
20:00	Schönenberger 34' (1:1); Conz 57' (pen. 2:1); Peterhans 86' (3:1)	FCB summary	19' (o.g. 0:1) (Conz)	Attendance: 7,500; Referee: (Switzerland) Freddy Philippoz (Sion)

3 April 1982 Round 21	Basel	0–2	Zürich	St. Jakob Stadium, Basel
20:00		FCZ summary FCB summary	16' (0:1) Jerković; (yellow card) 42' Iselin; 69' (0:2) Erba; (yellow card) 84' Jerković; (yellow card) 86' Landolt	Attendance: 6,500; Referee: (Germany) Werner Föckler Bad Dürkheim
Note: Corners: 10:7

4 April 1982 Round 22	Basel	4–2	Vevey-Sports	St. Jakob Stadium, Basel
18:00	von Wartburg 26' (1:0); Jeitziner 34' (2:0); Ceccaroni 55' (3:0); Maissen 64' (4:1); Graf (yellow card) 85'	FCB summary	62' (3:1) Débonnaire; 74' (4:2) Nicolet	Attendance: 7,500; Referee: (Switzerland) Jean-Marie Macheret, (Rueyres-St-Laurent)

17 April 1982 Round 23	Lausanne-Sport	2–3	Basel	Olympique de la Pontaise, Lausanne
20:30	Pfister 20' (1:1); Mauron 80' (2:2); Batardon (yellow card)	FCB summary	14' (pen. 0:1) Stohler; (red card) 23' Nickel; 52' (1:2) Jeitziner; 90+2' (2:3) Mullis; (yellow card) Lüthi	Attendance: 4,500; Referee: (Switzerland) Franz Gächter (Aarau, Suhr, Aargau)

24 April 1982 Round 24	Basel	2–1	Sion	St. Jakob Stadium, Basel
24:00	Stohler 9' (pen. 1:0); Duvernois 80' (2:1)	FCB summary	44' (1:1) Cucinotta	Attendance: 3,000; Referee: (Switzerland) Werner Liebi (Thun)
Note: Before the match Otto Demarmels was honored with flowers and a picture from Christoph Gloor for his 300th championship game with FCB.

1 May 1982 Round 25	Xamax	4–2	Basel	Stade de la Maladière (1924), Neuchâtel
20:00	Givens 34' (1:0); Forestier 69' (2:1); Givens 81' (3:1); Andrey 87' (pen. 4:2)	FCB summary	63' (1:1) Sutter; 85' (3:2) Mullis; (yellow card) Serge Duvernois; (yellow card) Bruno Graf; (yellow card) Jörg Stohler	Attendance: 7,300; Referee: (Switzerland) Marco Raveglia (San Vittore)
Note: Rainer Ohlhauser was present on the stands as an observer.

8 May 1982 Round 26	Basel	3–1	Bellinzona	St. Jakob Stadium, Basel
20:00	Maissen 21' (1:0); Nickel 58' (2:0); Maissen 79' (3:1); (yellow card) Maissen; (yellow card) Stohler; (yellow card) Graf	FCB summary	65' (2:1) Leoni	Attendance: 3,200; Referee: (Switzerland) Walter Nussbaumer (Crans-près-Céligny)
Note: Head-coach Helmut Benthaus was not present, as he had attended the Bundesliga match Bayern-Stuttgart in the afternoon.

15 May 1982 Round 27	St. Gallen	4–0	Basel	Espenmoos, St. Gallen
17:30	Gisinger 7' (1:0); Germann 10' (2:0); Ritter 57' (pen. 3:0); Friberg 68' (4:0)	FCB summary		Attendance: 5,700; Referee: (Switzerland) André Daina (Éclépens)
Note: Basel fans made themselves unpleasantly noticeable (firecrackers, rockets, fights).

25 May 1982 Round 28	Aarau	2–1	Basel	Stadion Brügglifeld, Aarau
20:00	Marti 6' (1:0); Herberth 8' (2:0)	FCB summary FCA summary	24' (2:1) Jeitziner	Attendance: 5,200; Referee: (Switzerland) Charles-Henri Morex (Bex)

5 June 1982 Round 29	Basel	1–3	Grasshopper Club	St. Jakob Stadium, Basel
20:00	Maissen 55' (1:2)	FCB summary	8' (0:1) Koller; 14' (0:2) Zanetti; 85' (1:3) Wehrli	Attendance: 9,500; Referee: (Switzerland) Rudolf Renggli (Stans and Luzern)

9 June 1982 Round 30	Basel	2–2	Luzern	St. Jakob Stadium, Basel
20:00	Jeitziner 3' (1:0); Sutter 22' (2:0)	FCB summary	67' (2:1) Tanner; 74' (2:2) Lauscher	Attendance: 4,000; Referee: (Switzerland) Werner Liebi (Thun)

==== Final league table ====
Pos	Team	Pld	W	D	L	GF	GA	GD	Pts	Qualification or relegation
1	Grasshopper Club	30	21	7	2	72	24	+48	49	Swiss champions, qualified for 1982–83 European Cup
2	Servette	30	20	6	4	76	32	+44	46	Qualified for 1982–83 UEFA Cup
3	Zürich	30	18	10	2	62	25	+37	46	Qualified for 1982–83 UEFA Cup and entered 1982 Intertoto Cup
4	Xamax	30	18	9	3	67	30	+37	45	
5	Young Boys	30	15	9	6	52	40	+12	39	Entered 1982 Intertoto Cup
6	Sion	30	12	7	11	51	46	+5	31	Swiss Cup winners, qualified for 1982–83 Cup Winners' Cup
7	Aarau	30	10	8	12	51	55	−4	28	
8	Basel	30	11	6	13	47	51	−4	28	
9	Luzern	30	10	7	13	54	59	−5	27	Entered 1982 Intertoto Cup
10	St. Gallen	30	10	5	15	40	45	−5	25	Entered 1982 Intertoto Cup
11	Vevey-Sports	30	6	11	13	44	57	−13	23	
12	Bellinzona	30	7	7	16	34	66	−32	21	
13	Lausanne-Sport	30	6	8	16	39	52	−13	20	
14	Bulle	30	5	9	16	29	58	−29	19	
15	Nordstern Basel	30	6	5	19	29	69	−40	17	Relegated to 1982–83 Nationalliga B
16	Chiasso	30	4	8	18	25	63	−38	16	Relegated to 1982–83 Nationalliga B

Source: rsssf.com
Rules for classification: 1) points; 2) goal difference; 3) number of goals scored.

=== Swiss Cup ===
The teams from the NLA joined the cup competition in the third round. Whenever possible, the draw was respecting regionalities and the lower-tier team was granted home advantage.

26 September 1981 Round 3	FC Sursee	1–9	Basel	Stadion Schlottermilch, Sursee
18:00	Hummel 53' (pen. 1:5)	FCB summary	20' (0:1) Demarmels; 23' (0:2) Duvernois; 26' (0:3) Sutter; 32' (0:4) Nickel; 48' (0:5) Maissen; 79' (1:6) Gaisser; 82' (1:7) Jeitziner; 83' (1:8) Maissen; 90' (1:9) Geisser	Attendance: 3,100; Referee: (Switzerland) Willi Jaus (Feldmeilen)

31 October 1981 Round 4	Bellinzona	0–1	Basel	Stadio Comunale, Bellinzona
14:45		FCB summary	26' (0:1) Maissen	Attendance: 2,400; Referee: (Switzerland) Othmar Winter, (Martigny)

21 March 1982 Round 5	Aarau	2–3	Basel	Stadion Brügglifeld, Aarau
15:00	Hegi (penalty missed) 7′ Herberth 36' (1:1); Da Costa 77' (2:3)	FCB summary FCA summary	6' (0:1) Hasler; 48' (1:2) Ceccaroni; 65' (1:3) Maradan; (yellow card) 85' Hasler	Attendance: 6,800; Referee: (Switzerland) Arturo Martino (Neukirch an der Thur)
Note: Hans Küng saved the penalty from Roger Hegi in the 7th minute.

12 April 1982 Quarter-final	Basel	2–1	Lausanne-Sport	St. Jakob Stadium, Basel
16:30	Maradan 6' (1:0); Maissen 11' (2:0)	FCB summary	90' (2:1) Dario; (yellow card) Dario	Attendance: 10,500; Referee: (Switzerland) Rudolf Affolter

4 May 1982 Semi-final	Basel	3–0	SR Delémont	St. Jakob Stadium, Basel
20:00	Duvernois (yellow card) 22'; Maissen 23' (1:0) (Schribertschnig) 86' (o.g. 2:0); Sutter 90' (3:0)	FCB summary	(yellow card) 87' Schribertschnig	Attendance: 10,200; Referee: (Switzerland) Jean-Marie Macheret, (Rueyres-St-Laurent)

31 May 1982 Final	Sion	1–0	Basel	Wankdorf Stadium, Bern
14:30	Balet 23' (1:0); Bregy (yellow card) 59'	FCB summary	(yellow card) 63' Lüthi	Attendance: 44,000; Referee: (Switzerland) Jean-Marie Macheret, (Rueyres-St-Laurent)
Note: 27,209 tickets sold in advance (a record). 5,030 in Basel, 10,976 in Valais, revenue 505,326 Swiss francs. Compensation for live television broadcast: 90,000 Swiss francs.

=== Swiss League Cup ===
4 August 1981 Round 1	Basel	1–0	Young Boys	St. Jakob Stadium, Basel
19:00	Sutter 63' (1:0)	FCB summary YB summary		Attendance: 6,400; Referee: (Switzerland) Bruno Galler
Note: Only 150 tickets were sold in advance, therefore there were long queues at the ticket counters.

9 September 1981 Round 2	Grenchen	1–2	Basel	Stadium Brühl, Grenchen
	Nüssing 62' (1:1)	FCB summary	3' (0:1) Stohler; 73' (1:2) Hasler	Attendance: 2,400; Referee: (Switzerland) Willy Hänni, (Cugy)

21 February 1982 Quarter-final	Aarau	1–0	Basel	Stadion Brügglifeld, Aarau
15:00	(Graf) 8' (o.g. 1:0)	FCB summary FCA summary		Attendance: 3,500; Referee: (Switzerland) Willy Hänni, (Cugy)

=== Coppa delle Alpi ===
Group A

4 July 1981 Round 1	Basel (Switzerland)	0–3	(France) Bordeaux	Stade du Tirage, Porrentruy
		FCB summary	26' (0:1) Lacombe; 35' (0:2) Giresse; 44' (0:3) Giresse	Attendance: 2,000; Referee: (France) Baccoud

11 July 1981 Round 2	Basel (Switzerland)	4–1	(France) Bastia	Parc des Sports, Delémont
18:30	Maissen 5' (1:1); Nickel 33' (2:1); Nickel 38' (3:1); Mullis 66' (4:1)	FCB summary	3' (0:1) Marini	Attendance: 2,000; Referee: (France) Jacques Ferrary

15 July 1981 Round 3	Bordeaux (France)	0–1	(Switzerland) Basel	Bordeaux
		FCB summary	18' (0:1) Nickel	Attendance: 3,000; Referee: (Switzerland) Walter Nussbaumer

18 July 1981 Round 4	Bastia (France)	0–4	(Switzerland) Basel	Stade Armand Cesari, Furiani
		FCB summary	28' (0:1) Nickel; 30' (0:2) Demarmels; 33' (0:3) Sutter; 66' (pen. 0:4) Nickel	Attendance: 1,200; Referee: (Switzerland) Bruno Burgener

NB: teams did not play compatriots

Group table

Pos	Team	Pld	W	D	L	GF	GA	(B)	Pts
1	Basel	4	3	0	1	9	4	2	8
2	Bordeaux	4	2	1	1	6	2	1	6
3	Bastia	4	1	1	2	7	10	1	4
4	Lausanne-Sport	4	0	2	2	3	9	0	2

NB: 1 bonus point awarded for victory by 3 or more goals

Final

29 September 1981 Final	Basel (Switzerland)	2–2 (a.e.t.) (5–3 p)	(France) Sochaux	St. Jakob Stadium Basel
	Gaisser 1' (1:0); Mullis 33' (2:1)	FCB summary	27' (1:1) Genghini; 55' (2:2) Bonnevay
	Penalties
	Stohler (penalty scored); Sutter (penalty scored) von Wartburg (penalty scored); Gaisser (penalty scored); Nickel (penalty scored)		(penalty scored) Bezaz; (penalty missed) Bonnevay; (penalty scored) Stopyra; (penalty scored) Zimako

== See also ==
- History of FC Basel
- List of FC Basel players
- List of FC Basel seasons

== Sources ==
- Rotblau: Jahrbuch Saison 2015/2016. Publisher: FC Basel Marketing AG. ISBN 978-3-7245-2050-4
- Die ersten 125 Jahre. Publisher: Josef Zindel im Friedrich Reinhardt Verlag, Basel. ISBN 978-3-7245-2305-5
- The FCB squad 1981–82 at fcb-archiv.ch
- Switzerland 1981–82 at RSSSF
- Swiss League Cup at RSSSF
- Cup of the Alps 1981 at RSSSF
