= Gerhard Delling =

German television presenter and journalist (born 1959)

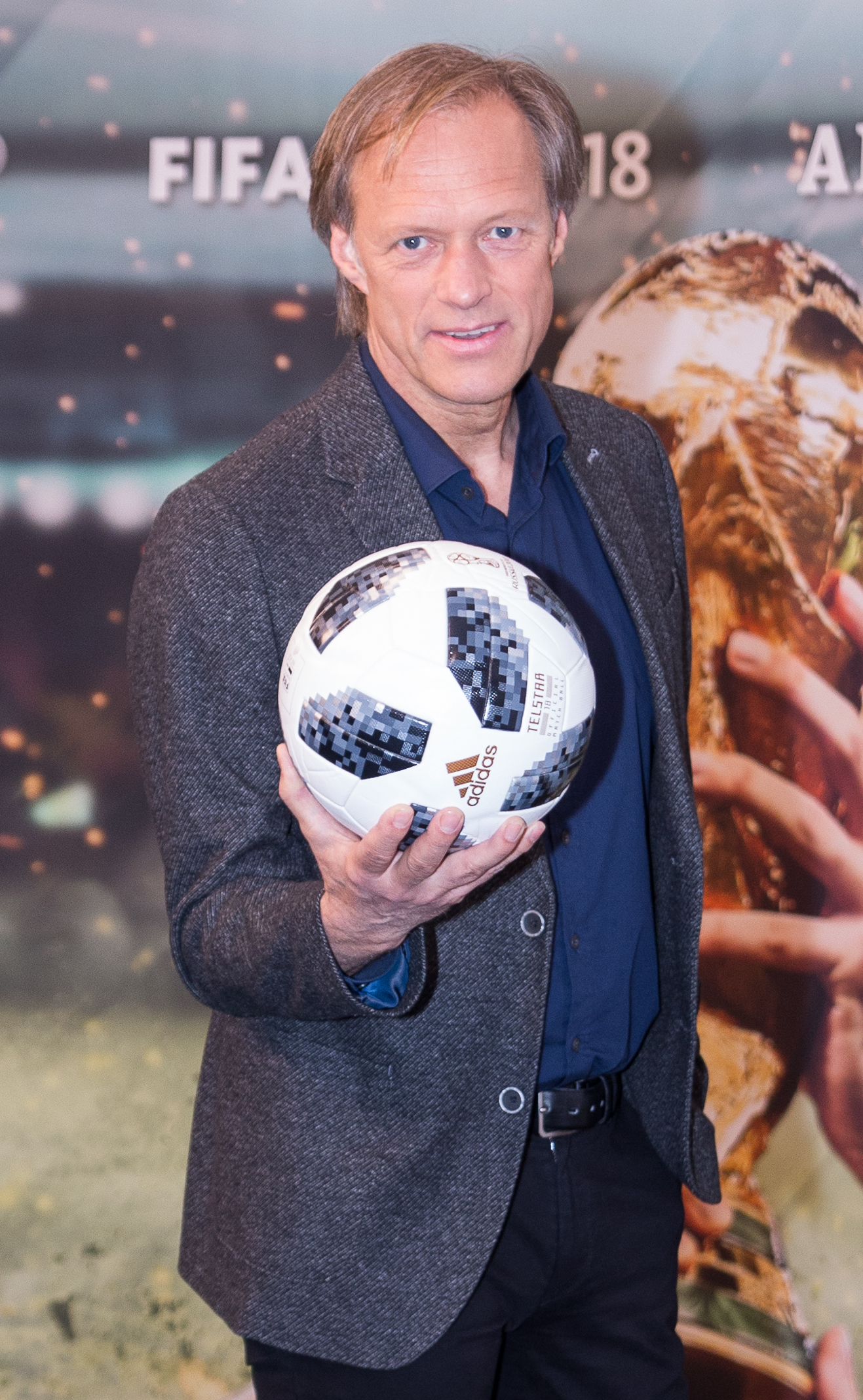
- Delling in 2018
- Born: 21 April 1959 (age 67); Rendsburg, Germany
- Occupations: Journalist, presenter
- Years active: 1987–present

Gerhard Delling (born 21 April 1959) is a German television presenter and sports journalist.

== Life ==
Delling was born in Rendsburg. From 1980 to 1985 he studied at University of Kiel. He worked since 1987 as a journalist for German broadcaster ARD. As a sport reporter he worked for ARD at football sport events. He wrote several books on German football. From 2011 to 2014 he was main presenter of the German television programme Wochenspiegel.

== Private life ==
Delling has three daughters, two of whom are from his first marriage. He was married to his second wife, television journalist Isabelle Delling (née Dreiss), who also worked for NDR, from June 2003 to the end of 2014.

Gerhard Delling has been in a relation to Hamburg-based entrepreneur Christina Block since 2021. She is the heiress of the "Block House" chain of fast-food restaurants.

== Charge of aiding and abetting kidnapping ==
Since the mid-2010s, Delling’s domestic partner, businesswoman Christina Block, has been involved in a prolonged custody dispute with her former husband, Stephan Hensel, the father of two of her four children. Three children have been living with their father in Denmark.

According to the public prosecutor’s office, the dispute escalated on New Year’s Eve 2023/24, when the two youngest children were taken from Denmark to Germany. At least five men are alleged to have ambushed Hensel and the children in Gråsten, southern Denmark, near the German border, before assaulting Hensel and forcing the children into a car. Two days later, the children appeared at the Hamburg home of Block and Delling. Investigations suggest that Block and Delling had discussed the possibility of bringing the children back against the father’s will with a private security company as early as 2021. Prosecutors also accused the couple of planning a smear campaign against the father and his lawyer, portraying them as paedophiles.

In April 2025, it was announced that the Hamburg public prosecutor’s office filed charges against both Block and Delling, in connection with the alleged abduction.

== Works ==
- Fußball-Deutsch, Deutsch-Fußball – Berlin: Langenscheidt, 2006
- Portugal 2004 – Munich: Südwest, 2004
- 50 Jahre Bundesliga – Göttingen: Verl. Die Werkstatt, 2012

== Awards ==
- 2000: Grimme-Preis (together with Günter Netzer)
