= Goal of the Year (Germany) =

Football award

The Goal of the Year in Germany is, like the Goal of the Month (Tor des Monats), the Goal of the Decade and Goal of the Century, an individual football award selected by viewers of the Sportschau (ARD German TV).

Klaus Fischer won it three times; his 1977 "Bicycle kick" was also pronounced Goal of the Century. He scored it on 16 November 1977 in the international game of Germany versus Switzerland in the Neckarstadion, Stuttgart.

== Details ==
The Goal of the Month Award and its sister event, the Goal of the Year Award, were incepted in 1971 by the German TV station ARD, one of two public broadcasting channels. Each month, the GotM is held, and five especially spectacular, unusual or important goals are shortlisted for the viewers to vote on. Initially votes were only cast per mail, but nowadays votes are commonly made by telephone or over the Internet. The winner gets a golden plaque which is one of the most-sought individual awards in German football.

The 12 winners are then eligible for the big annual event, the GotY Award. Again, the goal with the most votes wins. Parallel to this, the 10 annual winners may participate in the Goal of the Decade Award, and in 1999, the Goal of the Decade of the 70s, 80s and 90s squared off for the Goal of the Century Award, see above.

== Winners ==
=== Goal of the Year scorers ===
- 1971 Ulrik Le Fevre
- 1972 Günter Netzer and Gerd Müller
- 1973 Günter Netzer
- 1974 Erwin Kostedde
- 1975 Klaus Fischer
- 1976 Gerd Müller
- 1977 Klaus Fischer
- 1978 Rainer Bonhof
- 1979 Harald Nickel
- 1980 Karl-Heinz Rummenigge
- 1981 Karl-Heinz Rummenigge
- 1982 Klaus Fischer
- 1983 Jürgen Wilhelm
- 1984 Daniel Simmes
- 1985 Pierre Littbarski
- 1986 Stefan Kohn
- 1987 Jürgen Klinsmann
- 1988 Jürgen Wegmann
- 1989 Klaus Augenthaler
- 1990 Lothar Matthäus
- 1991 Andreas Müller
- 1992 Lothar Matthäus
- 1993 Jay-Jay Okocha
- 1994 Bernd Schuster
- 1995 Jean-Pierre Papin
- 1996 Oliver Bierhoff
- 1997 Lars Ricken
- 1998 Olaf Marschall
- 1999 Giovane Élber
- 2000 Alex Alves
- 2001 Kurt Meyer
- 2002 Benjamin Lauth
- 2003 Nia Künzer
- 2004 Klemen Lavrič
- 2005 Kasper Bøgelund
- 2006 Oliver Neuville
- 2007 Diego
- 2008 Michael Ballack
- 2009 Grafite
- 2010 Michael Stahl
- 2011 Raúl
- 2012 Zlatan Ibrahimović
- 2013 Raúl and Julian Draxler
- 2014 Mario Götze
- 2015 Carsten Kammlott
- 2016 Marcel Risse
- 2017 Lukas Podolski
- 2018 Nils Petersen
- 2019 Marcel Hartel
- 2020 Valentino Lazaro
- 2021 Gerrit Holtmann

=== Goal of the Decade ===
- 1970s: Klaus Fischer (1977) - bicycle kick
- 1980s: Klaus Augenthaler (1989) - goal from the middle circle
- 1990s: Bernd Schuster (1994) - goal from the middle circle

=== Goal of the Century ===
- Klaus Fischer (1977)- bicycle kick

== Notable cases ==
- In the most cases, spectacular and flashy goals win the Goal of the Year Award. But also Oliver Bierhoff's decisive goal to win the 1996 European Football Championship and Nia Künzer's header goal in the FIFA Women's World Cup 2003 were elected GotYs despite being rather unspectacular save for the circumstances.
- Bernd Schuster once managed to score the first, second and third most popular goal in the 1994 edition of Goal of the Year Award.
- Klaus Fischer scored the Goal of the Year in 1975, 1977 and 1982, and is the only player to have won three times. His 1982 GotY came in the 1982 FIFA World Cup semifinals against France, equalizing with a bicycle kick in the 108th minute. Two-time winners are Günter Netzer, Karl-Heinz Rummenigge, Gerd Müller, Lothar Matthäus and Raúl.
- Günter Netzer (1972 and 1973) and Karl-Heinz Rummenigge (1980 and 1981) are the only players to score two consecutive Goals of the Year.
- The oldest player was the 79-year-old Kurt Meyer, the only woman yet is Nia Künzer.
- Twice, own goals have won the Goal of the Month Award. Helmut Winklhofer once spectacularly smashed a wild 20-metre kick into his own goal, and another time, a horrified Frank Rohde saw his goalie kicking over his harmless back-pass.
