= Michael Stahl =

German footballer and football manager

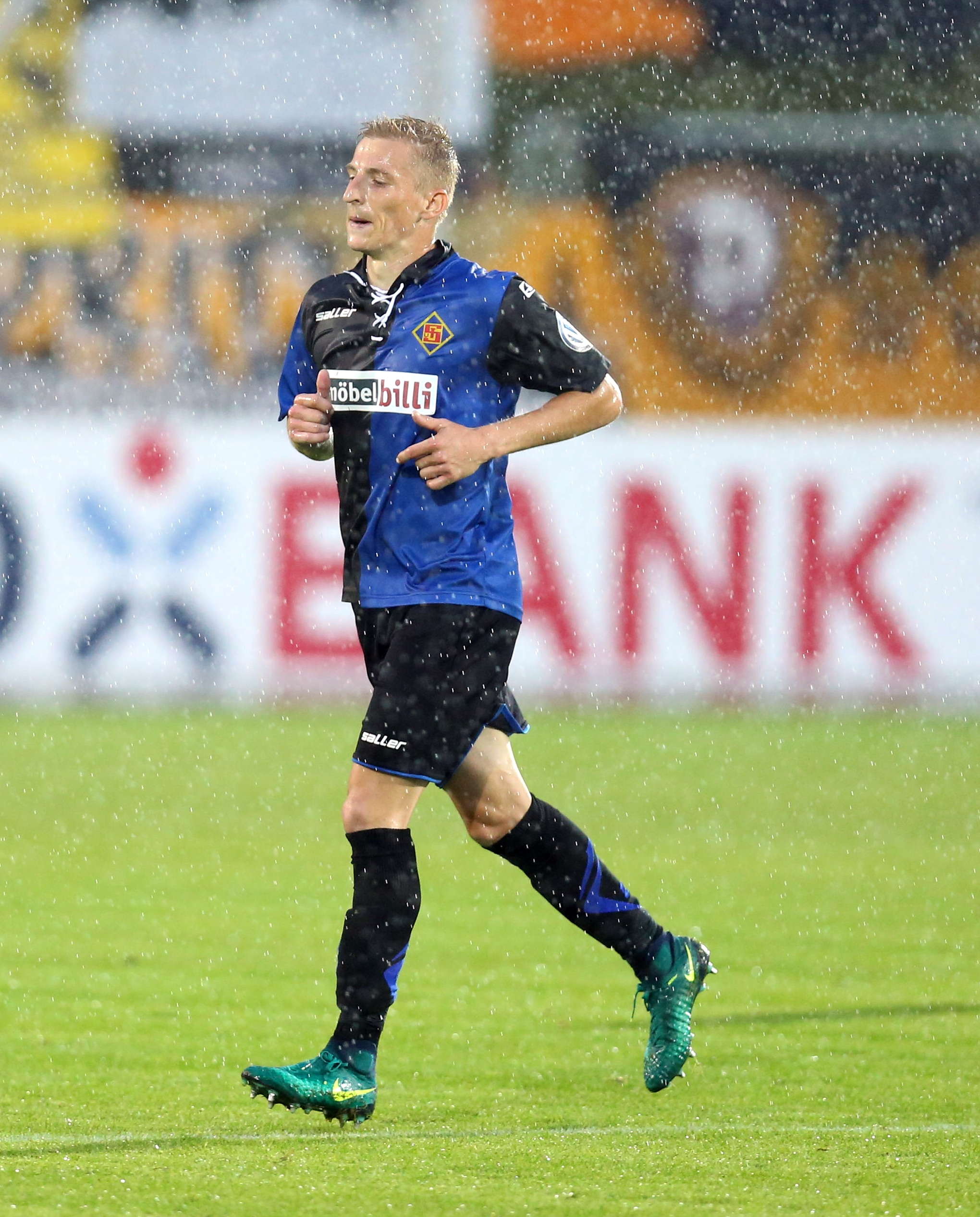

Personal information
- Date of birth: 15 September 1987 (age 39)
- Place of birth: Diez, West Germany
- Height: 1.80 m (5 ft 11 in)
- Positions: Midfielder; left-back; defender

Team information
- Current team: TuS Koblenz
- Number: 8

Youth career
- Schalke 04
- VfL Freiendiez
- –2003: Sportfreunde Eisbachtal
- 2003–2004: TuS Koblenz

Senior career*
Years	Team	Apps	(Gls)
2004–2005	TuS Koblenz	6	(0)
2005–2007	TSG Wörsdorf	30	(4)
2007–2008	VfR Aalen	17	(0)
2009–2015	TuS Koblenz	122	(11)
2016–	TuS Koblenz	183	(27)

Managerial career
- 2021–: TuS Koblenz
- * Club domestic league appearances and goals as of 30 April 2024

Michael Stahl (born 15 September 1987) is a German footballer who plays as a midfielder or defender for and manages TuS Koblenz. On 26 October 2010, he scored a goal from 61.5 metres in a DFB-Pokal match against Hertha BSC which Koblenz went on to win 2–1. The goal was voted as the ARD Goal of the Month and as the Goal of the Year.
