= Walter Eichenberger =

Swiss footballer (born 1946)

Personal information
- Full name: Walter Rudolf Eichenberger
- Date of birth: 28 November 1946 (age 79)
- Place of birth: Bern, Switzerland
- Position: Goalkeeper

Senior career*
Years	Team	Apps	(Gls)
1968–1986	BSC Young Boys	331	(0)
1980–1981	→ FC Basel (loan)	5	(0)

International career
1978–1979	Switzerland	1	(0)
- * Club domestic league appearances and goals

Walter Rudolf Eichenberger (born 28 November 1946) is a retired Swiss international footballer who played in the late 1960s, the 1970s and 1980s. He played as goalkeeper.

Eichenberger played his youth football for Young Boys and advanced to their first team in the 1968–69 Nationalliga A season. He played his entire career, with one small exception, for the club. He won the Swiss Cup in the 1976–77 with the Young Boys. Young Boys won the Swiss championship in the 1985–86 Nationalliga A season, Eichenberger played in only one match that season and then he ended his active football career. In total between the years 1968 and 1986 Eichenberger played 331 league games for the Young Boys.

The exception was as Eichenberger was on loan to FC Basel during the first half of their 1981–82 season, as replacement for their injured goalkeeper Hans Küng. Eichenberger played his league debut for the club in the home game in the St. Jakob Stadium on 7 November 1981 as Basel played 1–1 with Xamax. During his loan period, Eichenberger played a total of five league games for Basel.

Eichenberger was called up to play for his country. He played one match for the Swiss A-team and more for their B-team. His match for the A-team was on 22 May 1979 in the Wankdorf Stadium in Bern as Switzerland won 2–0 against Iceland in the UEFA Euro 1980 qualifying Group 4.

== Sources ==
- Die ersten 125 Jahre. Publisher: Josef Zindel im Friedrich Reinhardt Verlag, Basel. ISBN 978-3-7245-2305-5
- Verein "Basler Fussballarchiv" Homepage
