= Bruno Graf =

Swiss footballer (1953–2020)

Personal information
- Full name: Bruno Graf
- Date of birth: 30 August 1953
- Place of birth: Switzerland
- Date of death: 15 May 2020 (aged 66)
- Place of death: St. Gallen, Switzerland
- Position: Defender

Youth career
- until 1971: FC St. Gallen

Senior career*
Years	Team	Apps	(Gls)
1971–1977	FC St. Gallen	21	(7)
1972–1973	→ SC Brühl (loan)	11	(0)
1977–1978	Young Fellows Zürich	13	(1)
1978–1981	FC Chiasso	71	(4)
1981–1983	FC Basel	19	(0)
1983–1986	FC Wettingen	79	(6)
1986–1987	FC Winterthur	2	(0)
- * Club domestic league appearances and goals

Bruno Graf (30 August 1953 – 15 May 2020) was a Swiss footballer who played in the 1970s and 1980s. He played as a defender.

== Football career ==
Graf played most of his youth football for FC St. Gallen, with a short visit to FC Gossau, and advanced to the St. Gallen first team, who played in the Nationalliga A as an 18-year-old. During his first two seasons, he played only three games and was therefore loaned to Brühl St. Gallen in the second tier of Swiss football to obtain more playing experience.

Following his return to his club of origin, things did not work out as Graf wished, and therefore, a few years later, in 1977, he moved on to Young Fellows Zürich. But he could not help the Young Fellows from suffering relegation to the Nationalliga B that season. Thus, for the following season, Graf signed for Chiasso. Here, he became a regular starter for the team and stayed for three seasons.

Graf joined FC Basel's first team for their 1981–82 season under manager Helmut Benthaus. He played his domestic league debut for his new club in the home game at the St. Jakob Stadium on 15 August 1981 as Basel won 2–0 against FC Aarau. Between the years 1981 and 1983 Graf played a total of 43 games for Basel scoring one goal. 19 of these games were in the Nationalliga A, two in the Swiss Cup, two in the Swiss League Cup, seven in the Cup of the Alps and 13 were friendly games. He scored his first and only goal for the club on 30 September 1982 in the test game as Basel won 3–1 against the German team SV Weil.

Following his time with Basel, Graf moved on to Wettingen where he played for three seasons. In 1986, he moved to Winterthur, where he ended his active playing career.

== Private life ==
As a youngster, Graf completed his apprenticeship as a typewriter mechanic. After his professional football career, he worked for a while in the insurance industry, but then he switched to advertising technology. Up until his retirement, he worked in marketing for the company Historika in Oberuzwil, after he obtained his business diploma while working for them.

Graf married local girl Gabi Fantelli, and they had twins. In 2011, their son Leandro lost his life in a motorcycle accident. Soon after, Bruno Graf was diagnosed with cancer. His daughter is quoted as saying: "My father was a fighter, he remained an optimist, full of all the joys of life, he enjoyed his retirement despite illness, with travelling and by meeting old friends". On 15 May 2020, after a s two-day stay at the St. Gallen Cantonal Hospital, he died in the presence of his wife Gabi and his daughter Vanessa Graf.

== Sources ==
- Die ersten 125 Jahre. Publisher: Josef Zindel im Friedrich Reinhardt Verlag, Basel. ISBN 978-3-7245-2305-5
- Verein "Basler Fussballarchiv" Homepage
