= Beverly Ranger =

Jamaican former footballer (born 1953)

Personal information
- Full name: Beverly Ranger
- Date of birth: 13 March 1953 (age 73)
- Place of birth: Kingston, Jamaica
- Position: Forward

Senior career*
Years	Team	Apps	(Gls)
- Watford Ladies
- Amersham Angels
1974	SV Bubach-Calmesweiler		
1975–1976	Bonner SC		
1977	Lazio		
1977	SV Bergisch Gladbach 09		
1978	1. FFC 08 Niederkirchen		
- Kickers Offenbach
- * Club domestic league appearances and goals

Beverly Ranger is a Jamaican former footballer who played professionally in Germany during the 1970s. She had a short spell in Serie A with Lazio in 1977, but was not happy in Italy and returned to Germany.

Ranger was reportedly the first female footballer to earn her living from the sport in Germany. She achieved a level of celebrity by winning the Goal of the Month award from German television in June 1975 and secured a sponsorship deal with Puma.

She grew up in London after moving from Jamaica at age 12. After her football career she moved to the United States, where she worked in Charlotte, North Carolina as a teacher.

== Career ==
In Germany, she was one of the best-known players in the 1970s. She won the German Championship in 1975 with the SSG Bergisch Gladbach, and in June 1975, one of her goals was chosen as the goal of the month. She is regarded as the first professional player in Germany: she has received an equipment contract for more than 3,000 DM a month.

Born in the early 1950s in the Jamaican capital Kingston, the Beverly Ranger came to London with her parents at the age of 12. There she played football in a park not far from the Wembley Stadium with boys of the same age. Her talent was accidentally discovered by a journalist who suggested that she would join a football club. Ranger first played for the Watford F.C., later at the London suburb of Amersham Town F.C

In the 1970s she played in Germany. There the women's football was still in the children's shoes at that time. It was only in 1970 that the German Football Association allowed women's football under its umbrella. At that time, only one national league match was held at the national federation level. In 1974 a German championship was played for the first time in women's football. Beverly Ranger, one of the first foreign players in the higher-class women's football in Germany, was initially active in the Saarland SV Bubach / Calmesweiler and stepped from the 1974–75 season for the reigning German runner Bonner SC, who played in the Middle Rhine league on. A prominent fellow player here was the striker Anne Trabant-Haarbach, who had switched from the previous year's champion TuS Wörrstadt to Bonn. The team was able to defend her title in the Middle Rhine league, what had Beverly Ranger significant share on 26 April 1975, she scored the decider to the Middle Rhine championship against SV Bergisch Gladbach 09 just before the break the 1: 1 compensation, Bonn's won the encounter on Ended with 2-1 and moved into the final round the German championship 1975, where they again pushed to the finals. Here, the center of Bonn were able to have a 4: secure the title and even in this game, which took place prior to that time unusually large crowd of around 2,500 spectators 2 victory over Bayern Munich, to Beverly Ranger wore a on the scoresheet, she scored with a header The equalizer to the 2-2.

Their goal in the game against Bergisch Gladbach, where they had played five opponents as well as the goalkeeper, was voted in June 1975 by the spectators of the ARD Sportschau to the goal of the month. Beverly Ranger was the second woman after Bärbel Wohlleben a year before, which was awarded this award. Through the "Gate of the Month", Beverly Ranger was suddenly known to a wide public. Her popularity helped her among other things to a sponsorship contract with the sporting goods manufacturer Puma, so she was one of the first female footballers, who could exercise the sport in Germany at least semi-professionally. In 1976, she and Anne Trabant-Haarbach left Bonner SC and played for the SSG Bergisch Gladbach, where she again reached the final in 1977 and secured her second championship in a repeat game over the NSG Oberst Schiel. Other clubs included the Palatinate club 1. FFC 08 Niederkirchen, which won the Südwestdeutsche Verbandspokal in 1978 [2], as well as the Kickers Offenbach. After the end of her active football career, she moved to the USA in 1989 and lives in Charlotte, North Carolina.
