= TuS Koblenz =

German football club

- Full name: Turn- und Spielvereinigung; Koblenz 1911 e.V.
- Founded: 1 August 1911
- Ground: Stadion Oberwerth
- Capacity: 9,500 (2,000 seated)
- Chairman: Christian Krey
- Manager: Michael Stahl
- League: Oberliga Rheinland-Pfalz/Saar
- 2025–26: Oberliga Rheinland-Pfalz/Saar, 4th of 18
Home colours	Away colours

TuS Koblenz is a German association football club, located in Koblenz, Rhineland-Palatinate. Fussball Club Deutschland Neuendorf, which was formed in 1911, is viewed as the foundation of the modern club.

== History ==
=== Nazi era (1933–1945) ===
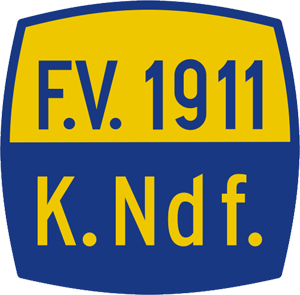
Logo of predecessor side FV Neuendorf ca. 1931.

The original club was lost in 1917, but in 1919 the successor side Fussball Verein 1911 Neuendorf was assembled out of the former memberships of FCD, Fussball Club Concordia 1910 Neuendorf, and Fussball Club Alemania 1912 Neuendorf, both of which had folded in 1914.

In 1933, FV joined the Gauliga Mittelrhein, one of sixteen top flight divisions established with the re-organization of German football in Nazi Germany that year. The club was immediately relegated, and in 1934 was joined by Turnverein 1864 Neuendorf, Arbeitersportverein Neuendorf and DJK Neuendorf, to create Turn- und Spielvereinigung Neuendorf. Both ASV and DJK were forced into the merger through the policies of the Nazi regime which regarded worker's and church-sponsored clubs as politically undesirable. TuS Neuendorf returned to first division play in 1935 and was in and out of the Gauliga over the next several seasons.

In 1941, the Gauliga Mittelrhein was divided into two new divisions: the Gauliga Köln-Aachen and the Gauliga Moselland. TuS again returned to first division football in the Gauliga Moselland (Gruppe Ost) and this time earned much better results, finishing second in 1942 and then winning their group in 1943 and 1944 before decisively taking the division in single game playoffs in each of these seasons. That put the club into the national playoffs, where they were eliminated in the early going in both appearances. As World War II progressed and Allied armies advanced into Germany, the Gauliga Moselland played progressively shorter schedules until the league finally collapsed and did not play the 1944–45 season.

=== Postwar ===
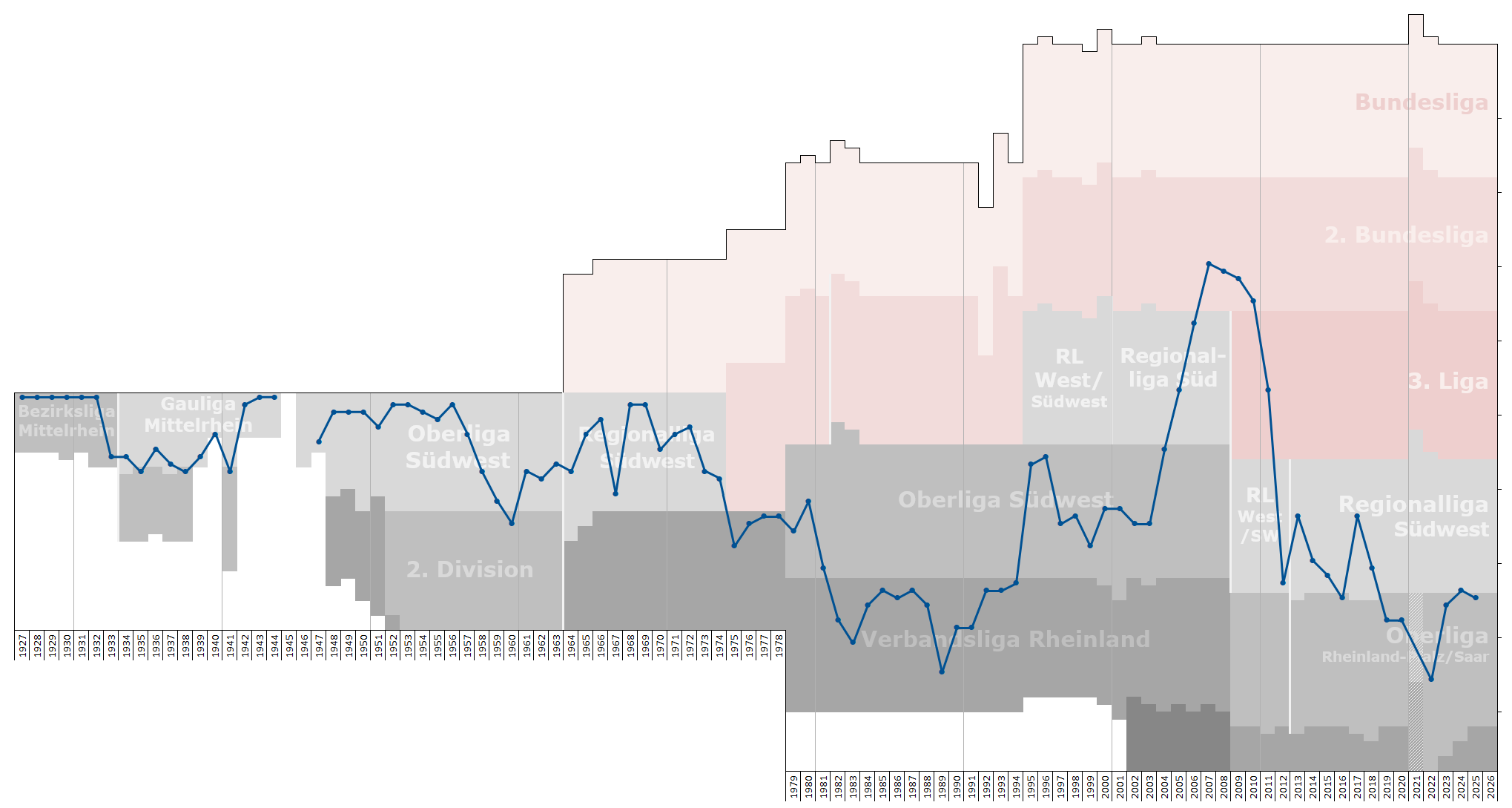
Historical chart of Koblenz league performance

In the immediate post-war period, the club returned to tier I football in the Oberliga Südwest (Gruppe Nord) in 1946 as SpVgg Neuendorf. Resuming their old identity as TuS, they re-appeared in the national playoffs in 1948 even though they had managed only a third-place finish in their division. 1. FC Saarbrücken had taken second place by finishing three points ahead of TuS and so were entitled to a playoff spot. However, Saarbrücken was one of several teams in the French-occupied Saarland which the French were actively working to establish as an independent state or make part of France. This led to Saarland-based German teams being refused permission to play the German national playoffs, and even the participation of a Saarland national side in the 1954 World Cup preliminaries. TuS earned its place that season through politics and advanced as far as the semi-finals before being put out 1–5 by 1. FC Kaiserslautern.

The club continued to play well through the early and mid-50s, earning additional turns in the national playoffs in 1950 and 1956, but was once again eliminated in both appearances in the early going. By the end of the decade their performance began to slip and in 1959 they were relegated. They returned to the Oberliga Südwest (I) in 1961 but could not now escape the lower half of the table.

=== Formation of the Bundesliga ===
With the formation of the Bundesliga in 1963, TuS found itself placed in the second division Regionalliga Südwest. In both 1968 and 1969, the club played well enough to participate in the playoff for a Bundesliga spot, but was unsuccessful on both occasions. By the 1970s, they were a third division side, playing in the Amateurliga Rheinland, missing opportunities for promotion to the 2. Bundesliga in playoff rounds in both 1977 and 1978. By 1981, the club had crashed below the third division where they were mired for nearly a decade-and-a-half.

=== TuS Koblenz ===
In 1982, the club adopted the name TuS Koblenz, but the change did little to help their performance, as they lingered in the Verbandsliga Rheinland (V). The fortunes of the club improved with their ascent to the fourth division Oberliga Südwest (IV) in 1994 where they remained for a decade. An Oberliga Südwest championship in 2004 was followed by a quick ascent through the Regionalliga Süd (III) where a second-place finish in 2005–06 earned the club a spot in the 2. Bundesliga. Their 2006–07 campaign ended with TuS finishing ahead of expectations in 12th place, meriting an unexpected stay on the second level.

Any hopes of further improvement ended in the late stages of the 2007–08 season when TuS was penalized by the deduction of eight points for not providing contracts for Marko Lomić and Branimir Bajić, turning a potential upper table finish into a lesser result. This was later reduced to six points for the actual season and three points for the following season 2008–09.

The club suffered relegation from the 2. Bundesliga in 2009–10 and played for a season in the 3. Liga before withdrawing to the level below for financial reasons. In 2010 the player Michael Stahl scored a goal from 61.5 metres in the DFB-Pokal against Hertha BSC. His goal was elected to ARD Goal Of The Year 2010. After the 2011–12 season in the Regionalliga West TuS became part of the new Regionalliga Südwest for the following year but was relegated from the league in 2015, dropping to the tier five Oberliga Rheinland-Pfalz/Saar. Koblenz won the Oberliga in 2015–16 and made an immediate return to the Regionalliga, but were relegated again at the end of the 2017–18 season.

== Honours ==
The club's honours:

=== League ===
- Oberliga Südwest (I)
  - Runners-up: 1952, 1953, 1956
- 2. Oberliga Südwest (II)
  - Runners-up: 1960
- Regionalliga Südwest (II)
  - Runners-up: 1968, 1969
- Oberliga Rheinland-Pfalz/Saar (IV)
  - Champions: 2004, 2016
- Verbandsliga Rheinland (IV)
  - Champions: 1994
- Amateurliga Rheinland (III)
  - Champions: 1977, 1978
- Bezirksklasse Rheingau VIII (at this time First League)
  - 1924, 1926, 1927, 1928, 1929, 1930, 1931, 1932

=== Cup ===
- Rhineland Cup
  - Winners: 1978, 1979, 2005, 2006, 2017, 2024
- DFB-Pokal

semifinal 1953/54

- south-west German Cup
  - winners 1954
- Mittelrheinpokal
  - winners 1946
- German Championship
  - semifinal

== Recent managers ==
Recent managers of the club:

Manager	Start	Finish
(England) Colin Bell	1 July 1989	10 December 1996
Rainer Kannegieser	11 December 1996	31 August 1998
Thomas Neis	1 September 1998	7 October 1998
Jürgen Roth-Lebenstedt	8 October 1998	30 June 2002
(Croatia) Milan Šašić	1 July 2002	23 April 2007
Uwe Rapolder	25 April 2007	13 December 2009
Uwe Koschinat	14 December 2009	28 December 2009
Petrik Sander	29 December 2009	30 June 2011
Michael Dämgen	1 July 2011	16 September 2012
(Kazakhstan) Peter Neustädter	17 September 2012	20 August 2013
(Greece) Evangelos Nessos	21 August 2013	8 December 2014
Petrik Sander	1 January 2015	11 February 2018
Anel Džaka	11 February 2018	19 November 2021
Michael Stahl	19 November 2021	Present

== Recent seasons ==
The recent season-by-season performance of the club:

Season	Division	Tier	Position
1999–2000	Oberliga Südwest	IV	9th
2000–01	Oberliga Südwest	IV	9th
2001–02	Oberliga Südwest	IV	11th
2002–03	Oberliga Südwest	IV	11th
2003–04	Oberliga Südwest	IV	1st ↑
2004–05	Regionalliga Süd	III	11th
2005–06	Regionalliga Süd	III	2nd ↑
2006–07	2. Bundesliga	II	12th
2007–08	2. Bundesliga	II	10th
2008–09	2. Bundesliga	II	14th
2009–10	2. Bundesliga	II	17th ↓
2010–11	3. Liga	III	11th (withdrawn)^{1}
2011–12	Regionalliga West	IV	17th
2012–13	Regionalliga Südwest	IV	8th
2013–14	Regionalliga Südwest	IV	14th
2014–15	Regionalliga Südwest	IV	16th ↓
2015–16	Oberliga Rheinland-Pfalz/Saar	V	1st ↑
2016–17	Regionalliga Südwest	IV	8th
2017–18	Regionalliga Südwest	IV	15th ↓
2018–19	Oberliga Rheinland-Pfalz/Saar	V	4th
2019–20	Oberliga Rheinland-Pfalz/Saar	V	4th
2020–21	Oberliga Rheinland-Pfalz/Saar	V	5th
2021–22	Oberliga Rheinland-Pfalz/Saar	V	6th
2022–23	Oberliga Rheinland-Pfalz/Saar	V	2nd ↑

- With the introduction of the Regionalligas in 1994 and the 3. Liga in 2008 as the new third tier, below the 2. Bundesliga, all leagues below dropped one tier. In 2012 the Oberliga Südwest was renamed Oberliga Rheinland-Pfalz/Saar. In 2012, the number of Regionalligas was increased from three to five with all Regionalliga West clubs from the Saarland and Rhineland-Palatinate entering the new Regionalliga Südwest.
- ^{1} TuS Koblenz did not request a license for the 3. Liga and was granted instead a license for the Regionalliga West.

↑ Promoted	↓ Relegated

== Current squad ==
As of 2 February 2024

Note: Flags indicate national team as defined under FIFA eligibility rules; some limited exceptions apply. Players may hold more than one non-FIFA nationality.

No.	Pos.	Nation	Player
1	GK	GER	Jonas Bast
4	DF	GER	Daniel von der Bracke
5	DF	GER	Almir Ahmetaj
6	MF	GER	Marcel Wingender
7	DF	GER	Armend Qenaj
8	DF	GER	Michael Stahl
9	FW	AUT	Erijon Shaqiri
10	MF	KOS	Behadil Sabani
11	FW	GER	Sandro Porta
12	DF	GER	Felix Könighaus
13	MF	PLE	Tariq-Emad Suleiman
14	MF	GER	Damir Grgic

No.	Pos.	Nation	Player
16	GK	GER	Michael Zadach
17	FW	GER	Nicolas Jörg (on loan from 08 Homburg)
18	FW	GER	Yusupha Sawaneh
19	FW	GER	Dylan Esmel
22	DF	GER	Dominic Volkmer
23	MF	GER	Leon Waldminghaus
24	DF	GER	Lukas Szymczak
25	MF	GER	Jan Mahrla
28	MF	GER	André Mandt
29	MF	GER	Sollano Rodrigues
33	GK	GER	Franjo Serdarusic
