= Harald Nickel =

German footballer (1953–2019)

- Nickel with Borussia Mönchengladbach in 1979

Personal information
- Date of birth: 21 July 1953
- Place of birth: Espelkamp, West Germany
- Date of death: 4 August 2019 (aged 66)
- Position: Forward

Youth career
- 1. FC Lübbecke

Senior career*
Years	Team	Apps	(Gls)
1971–1972	Arminia Bielefeld	5	(0)
1972–1975	KFC Turnhout	88	(43)
1975–1976	Union SG	30	(22)
1976–1977	K.V. Kortrijk	32	(14)
1977–1978	Standard Liège	32	(23)
1978–1979	Eintracht Braunschweig	27	(16)
1979–1981	Borussia Mönchengladbach	65	(32)
1981–1982	FC Basel	20	(6)
Total		299	(156)

International career
1978–1980	West Germany B	5	(3)
1979–1980	West Germany	3	(0)
- * Club domestic league appearances and goals

Harald Nickel (21 July 1953 – 4 August 2019) was a German footballer who played as a forward.

== Club career ==
Nickel spent four seasons in the Bundesliga, first one with Arminia Bielefeld. He then moved to Belgium and played for several clubs. Returning to Germany, he played one season with Eintracht Braunschweig and two for Borussia Mönchengladbach.

He is especially remembered for his goal in the 1979–80 UEFA Cup, second round return match in San Siro on 7 February 1979. Inter Milan played as favorites against Nickel's Borussia Mönchengladbach and were leading 1–0. Gladbach's keeper Wolfgang Kneib's goal-kick landed in the opponent's half. Harald Nickel took the ball on in the air, pulled away in the turn and slammed the ball directly under the crossbar from 40 meters. It was the goal to the result, a 1-1 draw (Borussia won after extra time) and this goal was later voted Goal of the Year 1979.

To end his career Nickel moved to Switzerland. He joined FC Basel's first team for their 1981–82 season under head coach Helmut Benthaus. Nickel played his debut for his new club in the Cup of the Alps game in Porrentruy on 4 July 1981 as Basel were defeated 3–0 by French team FC Girondins de Bordeaux. He scored his first goal for his new team in the next Cup of the Alps match, one week later in Delémont, on 11 July. In fact he scored a brace as Basel won 4–1 against Bastia. Basel advanced to the final, on 29 September, against Sochaux, which ended with a two goal each draw after extra time. In the penalty shoot-out Nickel converted the decisive spot-kick and Basel lifted the trophy.

He played his domestic league debut for the club in the home game in the St. Jakob Stadium on 15 August as Basel won 2–0 against Aarau. He scored his first league goal with the team in the home game on 12 September. In fact he scored a hat-trick as Basel won 3–0 against local rivals Nordstern. Basel ended the season in 8th position in the league table and Nickel retired from active football. He played a total of 41 games for Basel scoring a total of 14 goals. 20 of these games were in the Swiss Super League, two in the Swiss Cup, three in the League Cup five in the Cup of the Alps and 11 were friendly games. He scored six goals in the domestic league, one in the cup, five in the Cup of the Alps and the other two were scored during the test games.

== International career ==
Nickel was also capped three times for West Germany.

== Private life ==
Born in Espelkamp, West Germany, Nickel played his youth football with local club 1. FC Lübbecke.

At the age of just 66, the former international player Harald Nickel succumbed to serious cancer on the 4 August 2019.

== Honours ==
Borussia Mönchengladbach

- UEFA Cup runner-up: 1979–80

Basel

- Cup of the Alps: 1981

Individual

- German Goal of the Year award: 1979
- UEFA Cup top scorer: 1979–80
- Belgian First Division top scorer: 1977–78
