= Infront =

Norwegian financial market data and software company

- Type: Private
- Industry: Financial technology
- Founded: 1998; 28 years ago in Oslo, Norway
- Founders: Kristian Nesbak; Morten Lindeman
- Headquarters: Oslo, Norway
- Key people: Enrique Sacau (CEO)
- Products: Market data terminals, portfolio management software, regulatory software
- Owner: Inflexion Private Equity
- Number of employees: c. 500 (2021)
- Website: www.infront.co

Infront is a Norwegian financial technology company based in Oslo, with operations across Europe. It sells market data, trading terminals, portfolio management tools and regulatory software to banks, brokers, asset managers and other financial firms. Kristian Nesbak and Morten Lindeman founded the company in 1998.

Infront traded on the Oslo Stock Exchange from 2017 until 2021 as Infront ASA. During that time it bought the German data and software group vwd for 130 million euros, which took it into continental Europe. The British investment firm Inflexion Private Equity acquired Infront in 2021 and took it off the exchange.

== History ==
=== Early years and listing ===
Nesbak and Lindeman set up Infront in Oslo in 1998. The company built a terminal that combined market data, news, analytics and electronic trading in a single interface. By 2016 it employed 121 people and had offices in Oslo, Stockholm, Copenhagen, Paris, London, Cape Town and Johannesburg, with operating revenue a little over 210 million kroner. Much of the growth came through acquisitions, and in 2018 Infront agreed to take over the Nordic customers of its main rival, SIX Financial Information.

The company floated in Oslo in 2017. The shares were issued at 23 kroner, valuing Infront at 598 million kroner, and trading began on 29 September.

=== Purchase of vwd ===
In April 2019 Infront agreed to buy vwd Vereinigte Wirtschaftsdienste GmbH from a fund managed by The Carlyle Group for 130 million euros. vwd, based in Frankfurt, supplied information and IT systems to the investment industry and was almost twice the size of Infront by turnover. The purchase was financed with a share issue and a bond of 105 million euros.

The deal completed in July 2019 and roughly tripled group revenue, which reached 25.3 million euros in the third quarter against 7.1 million a year earlier. The company reported a net loss of 7.83 million euros for that quarter, largely because of costs booked against the acquisition, and switched its reporting currency from kroner to euros.

The German subsidiary was renamed Infront Financial Technology GmbH in February 2020, retiring the vwd brand after more than seventy years.

=== Inflexion takeover ===
In December 2020 Inflexion Private Equity offered about 1.5 billion kroner for Infront. The board recommended the offer unanimously, and Nesbak and Lindeman, who between them held 26.1 per cent of the shares, had committed to sell. Both reinvested part of the proceeds and stayed on to run the business, which then had around 500 employees in 13 countries. The takeover completed in June 2021 and the shares were removed from the Oslo Stock Exchange that month.

=== Assetmax and later changes ===
In August 2022, under chief executive Zlatko Vucetic, Infront agreed to buy Assetmax AG of Zurich, founded in 2013 by Massimo Ferrari. Assetmax made multi-custody portfolio management, client relationship management and reporting software and had about 70 customers. The transaction closed on 30 September 2022.

In May 2024 Infront launched the integrated Assetmax software in the Benelux, marking the occasion by sounding the opening gong at Euronext Amsterdam.

Zlatko Vucetic resigned as chief executive in October 2025. Enrique Sacau, previously group chief executive of Kneip and before that head of the European business of the wealth management platform FNZ, succeeded him with effect from 6 October 2025. Ferrari left in 2026, and Infront hired Luca Angelini, formerly of CEPRES and SEI Novus, as product director for portfolio and advisory solutions.

== Operations ==
Infront supplies market data feeds, a professional trading and information terminal, tools for portfolio management and advisory work, and software for regulatory reporting, valuation and distribution. Customers range from banks, brokers and exchanges to independent asset managers and family offices.

The German business operates from Frankfurt. Assetmax, run from Switzerland, had about 120 Swiss clients in 2026, mainly larger independent asset managers and private banks.
