= History of FC Basel (1965–2000) =

The history of FC Basel spans from 1893 to the present day. This page covers the years 1965 to 2000, from the era under Helmut Benthaus, through seven seasons in the second tier, to the opening of a new stadium. For details on other periods of the club's history, see:

- History of FC Basel (1893–1939)
- History of FC Basel (1939–1965)
- History of FC Basel (2000–present)

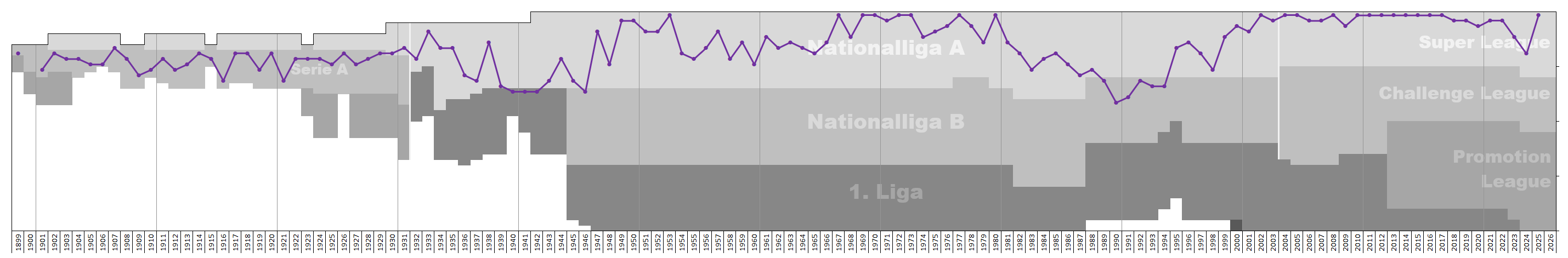
Chart of FC Basel table positions in the Swiss football league system

The Basel Coat of Arms, FC Basel's Original logo

== The era Benthaus ==
=== Seventy-third, player-manager ===
Lucien Schmidlin was club chairman for the fourth consecutive year. At the beginning of the season, Helmut Benthaus joined from 1. FC Köln and became player-coach. He replaced Jiří Sobotka as team manager; Sobotka later went on to manage the Swiss national team. Benthaus was a graduate of the German Sport University Cologne and an experienced player-coach. Two seasons earlier Benthaus had won the 1963–64 Bundesliga as player-manager with Köln. Benthaus used his first season with Basel to assess the team. One of the biggest changes that he made, with the agreement of the board of directors, was to introduce semi-professionalism. There were only a few minor changes to the squad, Rade Ognjanović transferred to Grenchen and Heinz Sartor transferred to Offenburger FV. Three players stepped back from Nationalliga A football, Carlo Porlezza, Mario Grava and Fernando Von Krannichfeldt went to play for the reserve team. As replacements, three youngsters came from the youth team and three more from the reserve team.

Fourteen teams contested the 1965–66 Nationalliga A. Basel finished the season in sixth position with 27 points. They ended the championship with ten wins, seven draws and nine defeats in their 26 matches. In the Swiss Cup, Basel started in the round of 32 on 7 November 1965, with a home win against Biel-Bienne. In the next round, they defeated Luzern 3–1 at home. In the quarter-final, they were drawn away at the Wankdorf Stadium in Bern against Young Boys. This ended in a 2–1 victory. In the semi-final they were drawn at home against Servette but were defeated 1–3. Zürich won the final and completed the double.

In the 1965–66 Inter-Cities Fairs Cup, Basel were drawn against Spanish team Valencia but lost both matches. In the Cup of the Alps, Basel were drawn in the same group as Catania, S.S.C. Napoli, Juventus and Spal Ferrara. Basel lost all four games.

=== Seventy-fourth, the double ===
Harry Thommen took over as club chairman at the AGM from Lucien Schmidlin who stood down to become vice-chairman. During this season, Helmut Benthaus was the club player-manager for the second consecutive season and there were only a few minor changes in the squad. In the 1966–67 season, Benthaus achieved his first league championship with Basel. Fourteen teams contested the championship and Basel finished just one point clear of FC Zürich. Basel won 16 of their 26 games, drew eight, and lost only twice, scoring 60 goals and conceding just 20. Roberto Frigerio was the team's top goal scorer with 16 league goals, while Helmut Hauser was second-best with 14. In the highest scoring game of the season, a 10–0 win against FC Moutier Roberto 'Mucho' Frigerio managed to score four goals.

In the Swiss Cup, Basel started in the round of 32 with a 6–0 home win against Blue Stars. In the round of 16, also at home, they beat FC Zürich 3–2. In the quarter-final, Basel won the replay against Biel-Bienne 2–1 to qualify for the semi-finals. Basel played an away match in the Stadio Cornaredo against FC Lugano in the semi-final which ended goalless and therefore a replay was required here too. The replay was played in the St. Jakob Stadium and goals from Karl Odermatt and Helmut Benthaus gave Basel a 2–1 victory to qualify for the final which was to take place three days later. In the Cup final Basel's opponents were Lausanne-Sports. In the former Wankdorf Stadium on 15 May 1967, Helmut Hauser scored the decisive goal via penalty. The game went down in football history due to the sit-down strike that followed this goal. After 88 minutes of play, with the score at 1–1, referee Karl Göppel awarded Basel a controversial penalty. André Grobéty pushed Hauser in the back, and Hauser fell to the ground. Following Basel's 2–1 lead, the Lausanne players refused to resume the game and staged a sit-down protest on the pitch. The referee had to abandon the match. Basel were awarded the cup with a 3–0 forfeit.

Basel had won the double for the first time in the club's history.

In the first round of the 1966–67 Inter-Cities Fairs Cup, Basel were drawn against VV DOS Utrecht. The first leg was played in the Netherlands and ended in a 2–1 defeat, despite an early lead. In the return leg, Basel led 2–0, but VV DOS equalised, winning 4–3 on aggregate.

=== Seventy-fifth season ===
The chairman of the club's board was Harry Thommen for the second consecutive year. Helmut Benthaus was the club player-manager for the third consecutive season. He and his team were the defending league champions. There were no big amendments to the squad, one reserve goalkeeper left and one reserve goalkeeper advanced to them and defender Manfred Schädler joined from local club FC Birsfelden and striker Dieter Rüefli joined from Winterthur. Basel played a total of 42 matches in this season. 26 of these games were in the domestic league, two were in the Swiss Cup, two were in the European Cup, five were in the Cup of the Alps and seven were friendly matches. Of the seven friendly matches, five were won and two ended in draws.

Again there were 14 teams contesting in the 1967–68 Nationalliga A. Basel, as reigning champions, played a mediocre season. Although they remained close to the top of the table for much of the season, they faltered toward the end, losing five of their last seven matches. Basel won 13 of the league 26 games, drawing five, losing eight times, and they scored 49 goals conceding 33. Therefore, they finished the season in fifth position. They were seven points behind the trio Zürich, Grasshopper Club and Lugano who all ended the season with 38 points. The three teams then contested a championship play-off. Zürich won both matches and claimed the title. In the Swiss Cup Basel started in the round of 32 with a home match against lower classed FC Le Locle. But the game had to go into overtime. After Le Locle took the lead just after half time break, Roberto Frigerio netted the equaliser shortly before the end. In extra time, player-manager Helmut Benthaus scored the winning goal. In the next round Basel played an away game against FC Zürich but were defeated 0–1 and this campaign was ended very quickly.

As reigning champions Basel were qualified for the 1967–68 European Cup. In the first round they were drawn against Danish team Hvidovre. The first leg was in the St. Jakob Stadium. Despite an early lead scored by Helmut Hauser, the Danes turned the game and won. In the return leg in stadium Idrætsparken in Copenhagen, Hauser again scored the early lead. Again the Danes turned the match and shortly after half time went into a 3–1 lead. This time Basel were fighting against the defeat and drew level at 3–3 but could not manage to score a winning goal, which would have put them through to the next round.

=== Seventy-sixth, third league title ===
Harry Thommen was the club's chairman of the board for the third consecutive season and Helmut Benthaus was the club's player-manager for the fourth consecutive season. Paul Fischli joined the team coming from Young Fellows Zürich. Jürgen Sundermann signed in from Servette and Walter Balmer joined from Thun. In the other direction Hanspeter Stocker left the club after eight years and moved to Baden for his last season before retiring from his active football career. Markus Pfirter left the club after seven years and went on to St. Gallen. Roberto Frigerio also left the club after a total of seven years and he moved on to Bellinzona. Moscatelli left after five years and went to Lugano.

Basel played a total of 52 matches in this season. 26 of these games were in the domestic league, three were in the Swiss Cup, five were in the Cup of the Alps, two were in the Inter-Cities Fairs Cup and 15 were friendly matches. Of the 15 friendlies, 12 were won, two were drawn, and one was lost. Seven were played at home and eight played away. There were 14 teams contesting in the 1968–69 Nationalliga A. Basel won the league, finishing one point ahead of Lausanne Sports —whom they defeated 4–0 in the penultimate match—and six points clear of third-placed FC Zürich. Basel won 13 of the 26 games, drawing ten, losing three times, they scored 48 goals conceding 28.

In the Swiss Cup Basel started in the round of 32 with a 2–1 away win against Thun and in the round of 16, with a home match, they beat Luzern 3–1. In the Quarter-final Basel played an away game against Servette but lost this 1–0. In the Inter-Cities Fairs Cup Basel were drawn against Bologna the first leg away from home on 18 September the return leg in Basel on 2 October. Bologna won both games. In the 1968 Cup of the Alps the team managed to win the group and played in the final against FC Schalke 04 but were defeated 1–3 after extra time.

=== Seventy-seventh, consecutive league title ===
Harry Thommen was the club's chairman for the fourth consecutive season and Helmut Benthaus was player-manager for the fifth consecutive season. The championship title from the previous season meant that Basel could embark on another European adventure, but again they failed to overcome the first hurdle; this time it was Celtic of Scotland. The first leg, played on 17 September 1969 at St. Jakob Stadium before 37,587 spectators, ended in a goalless draw. The return leg on 1 October in Celtic Park attracted 49,976 spectators. Celtic won the game 2–0 and advanced to the next round.

Nationally in the 1969–70 season, Basel won the league for the fourth time. They played a good season. Despite a bad run with four defeats in eight games between the end of September and the beginning of December, they won 11 of the last 14 games during the second half of the season. Basel won the championship a point clear of Lausanne Sports who ended in second position and three points ahead of FC Zürich who finished third. Basel won 15 of the 26 games, drawing seven, losing four times.

On 14 September 1969, Basel began their Swiss Cup campaign with a 10–0 home win against Minerva Bern (later renamed Breitenrain Bern following a merger). In the round of 16 played on 12 October Basel had a home match against Grenchen which was won 3–2. In the quarter-final, played in November, Basel had a two legged tie against Xamax-Sports NE (later renamed Neuchâtel Xamax). This was won 7–2 on aggregate. The semi-final was also a two legged tie and this against Servette Genève. Basel won both legs and 6–1 on aggregate. The final was played on 18 May 1970 in the Wankdorf Stadium, but was lost against Zürich after extra time.

=== Seventy-eighth, defeated in the play-off ===
Félix Musfeld was the club's new chairman. Helmut Benthaus was player-manager for the sixth consecutive season. There were only very few changes in the squad. Bruno Michaud retired from active football after winning his third championship title. He had played 14 seasons with Basel. During his time with Basel Michaud played a total of 355 competitive games and scored 22 goals. Dieter Rüefli moved on to play for St. Gallen and Janos Konrad moved on to Vevey-Sports. In the other direction Edoardo Manzoni joined the squad on loan from Xamax. Benthaus declined further transfers, instead relying on reserve players to step in when needed. Basel played a total of 55 matches during this season. 27 of these games were in the domestic league including the play-off for the championship. Three of these games were in the Swiss Cup, four were in the European Cup, five were in the Cup of the Alps and 16 were friendly matches. Of these 16 test games 13 were won and three were drawn.

Basel won 18 of their 26 league games, drawing six, losing just twice, they scored 67 goals conceding 26. They finished the regular season level on points with Grasshopper Club Zürich and so these two teams had to contest a play-off game on 8 June 1971 to decide the title winners. Grasshopper won the play-off 4–3 after extra time.

On 1 November 1969 Basel started in the Swiss Cup in the round of 32 with a 5–1 home win against CS Chênois. In the round of 16 played on 29 November Basel had a home match against Bellinzona which was won 2–0. In the quarter-final, played on 28 February 1971, Basel had an away tie against Mendrisiostar (after club merger later renamed FC Mendrisio-Stabio). However, this was lost 0–2 after extra time. Servette won the cup competition at the end of the season.

In the European Cup Basel were drawn against Spartak Moscow. The first leg, played away on 16 September 1970, ended in a 2–3 loss. Odermatt and Benthaus scored in the final 12 minutes after Basel had fallen three goals behind with 15 minutes left. In the second leg played in the St. Jakob Stadium Basel won 2–1, the goals being scored by Siegenthaler und Walter Balmer. Thus the tie ended 4–4 on aggregate. Basel won on away goals and advanced to the second round. Here they were drawn against Ajax, first away from home, but they suffered a 0–3 defeat. The second leg at home also ended with a defeat, 1–2, despite the fact that Odermatt put Basel one up with a penalty after 36 minutes.

In the 1970 Cup of the Alps Basel were in the Swiss Group together with Lugano, Young Boys and Zürich. They played against each of the four Italian teams Fiorentina, Lazio, Sampdoria and Bari. Basel won the Swiss group and in the final they faced and beat Fiorentina 3–2.

=== Seventy-ninth, fifth championship title ===
The club's chairman was Félix Musfeld for the second year in a row. Helmut Benthaus was again player-manager, but toward the end of his playing career Benthaus stood on the side line as team manager and he only substituted himself into the game if it was not running as he wanted it. In this season Benthaus substituted himself in during just one single game. This being the second last home match of the season on 27 May against Luzern. Benthaus retired from playing at the end of the season, aged 36. He made only minor adjustments to his squad at the beginning of the season, Rolf Blättler joined from Lugano, René Hasler from Zürich and youngster Ottmar Hitzfeld was brought in from FV Lörrach from the lower German league.

Basel remained undefeated in the league during the first 24 rounds. Of their 26 league games Basel won 18, drawing seven, losing just once, scoring 66 goals conceding 28. Basel won the championship four points ahead of Zürich and five points ahead of the Grasshoppers. Ottmar Hitzfeld was Basel's top league goal scorer with 16 league goals.

For Basel the Swiss Cup started in the round of 32 on 24 October 1971 with a 3–1 home win against Monthey. On 21 November in the round of 16 Basel played away from home against La Chaux-de-Fonds. The match resulted with a 3–0 success. The quarter-final was played on 12 March 1972 in Zürich against Grasshopper-Club. The tie ended with a 1–1 draw and this meant a replay three days later. Basel won the replay 3–2 and continued onto the semi-finals against BSC Young Boys. In the Wankdorf Stadium on 3 April Karl Odermatt and Walter Balmer each scored a goal to give Basel a 2–0 victory. The final was played on 22 May 1972 at the Wankdorf Stadium where Basel were defeated 1–0 by Zürich through a goal by Jeandupeux in first-half extra time.

The 1971–72 UEFA Cup was the inaugural year of the UEFA Cup (now known as the UEFA Europa League), which effectively replaced the Inter-Cities Fairs Cup. In the first round Basel were drawn against Real Madrid. The first leg, played on 15 September 1971 at St. Jakob Stadium before 32,059 spectators, ended in a 2–1 defeat for Basel. Madrid won thanks to goals from Francisco Aguilar and Santillana, who turned the result around after the Swiss scored the opener through René Hasler. The return leg on 29 September in Santiago Bernabéu Stadium was watched by 61'861 spectators and also ended with the same result. The same two Spanish international players were the heroes once again, each scoring a goal, to ensure Real Madrid their passage to the next round.

=== Eightieth, double with Swiss League Cup ===
The 1972–73 season was Benthaus' eighth season as manager. There were only small amendments to the squad during the pre-season. Roland Paolucci was loaned out to Winterthur and Stefan Reisch left the team and moved on to Kickers Würzburg where he ended his active playing career. Basel did not sign any new players, as Benthaus relied on young players promoted from the reserve team to provide support when needed in the first team. Basel played a total of 55 matches during this season. 26 of these games were in the domestic league championship, seven of these games were in the Swiss Cup, four in the Swiss League Cup, two were in the European Cup, four were in the Cup of the Alps and 12 were friendly matches. Of these 12 friendlies, four were won, four drawn, and four lost.

Basel started the league season badly, losing the first two games and drawing the next two. The first victory was recorded in the fifth round and during the next nine rounds Basel won eight games. After the winter break, Basel were defeated only once. They won the championship four points ahead of Grasshopper Club and six ahead of the Sion. Basel won 17 of their 26 league games, drew five and lost four. Ottmar Hitzfeld was the league's joint top goal scorer with 18 league goals.

In the Swiss Cup Basel played the round of 32 on 5 November 1972 at home to Martigny-Sports in the St. Jakob Stadium. The round of 16 match on 26 November 1972 was played away against BSC Young Boys and Basel left the Wankdorf Stadium with a 4–0 victory. The quarter-finals were two legged fixtures, the first leg played on 10 December 1972 in Stadio Comunale was won 2–0 against Chiasso and the second leg played one week later was won 5–3. The semi-finals were also two legged fixtures. Basel were matched against Biel-Bienne and won 6–1 on aggregate. Walter Balmer scored a hat-trick in the home game. The final was played on 23 April 1973 in the Wankdorf Stadium against Zürich. The game ended goalless after 90 minutes. In extra time Peter Marti (92) and Fritz Künzli (101) scored the goals to give Zürich the title for the second consecutive time in a final against Basel.

The 1972 Swiss League Cup was the inaugural Swiss League Cup competition. It was played in the summer of 1972 as a pre-season tournament to the 1972–73 Swiss football season. Basel beat Servette 8–0, Lausanne Sports 2–1 aet and Sion 6–1 to reach the final. This was won by Basel who defeated FC Winterthur 4–1 in the final which took place on 11 November 1972 at the Letzigrund in Zürich. Ottmar Hitzfeld scored a hat-trick in the final.

Basel were beaten by Újpesti Dózsa 2–0 in the first leg of the first round of the 1972–73 European Cup away from home in the Ferenc Szusza Stadium. The return match was on 27 September 1972 in St. Jakob Stadium. Basel won 3–2, the goals coming from René Hasler (65) and Walter Balmer (75 + 83), but they were beaten 4–3 on aggregate. In the 1972 Cup of the Alps, Basel played twice against Olympique Lyonnais, losing the away tie but winning the home game. They played twice against Bordeaux, winning the away game but losing the home game, but because Bordeaux won their other two games they continued to the final.

=== Eighty-first season ===
The club's chairman was Félix Musfeld for the fourth season in a row and this was the ninth season with Helmut Benthaus as first team manager. At the beginning of the season, Urs Siegenthaler moved to Xamax and Rolf Riner joined Servette. In the other direction Rudolf Wampfler joined from Sion, Arthur von Wartburg joined from Concordia Basel and Roland Paolucci returned from his loan to Winterthur. The most notable transfer was that of Teófilo Cubillas from Alianza Lima. However, Cubillas only remained at the club for six months, which was not long enough for him to fully demonstrate his talent. Basel played a total of 54 games in their 1973–74 season. 26 in the domestic league, four in the Swiss Cup, one in the Swiss League Cup, six in the European Cup and 17 were friendly matches.

Zürich won the championship 12 points ahead of Grasshopper Club, 13 ahead of the Servette and FC Winterthur. Basel finished in fifth position and were 16 points behind the new champions. Basel won 13 of their 26 league games, drew three and lost ten games. Basel's striker Ottmar Hitzfeld was the team's top goal scorer, with 19 league goals he was third in the league ranking behind Daniel Jeandupeux (22) and Walter Müller (21). In the Swiss Cup Basel played the round of 32 on 22 September 1973 away against Biel-Bienne in the Gurzelen Stadion and won 2–1. In the round of 16 on 6 October 1973 they played away again against Mendrisiostar and won 4–1. In this game Cubillas scored two goals. The quarter-final was a two-legged fixture. The first leg played on 31 October 1973 in Stade Tourbillon was a 1–0 defeat against Sion. The second leg played on 4 November 1973 in the St. Jakob Stadium ended in a 2–2 draw, thus Sion won 3–2 on aggregate. In the 1973 Swiss League Cup Basel were drawn with an away game against Neuchâtel Xamax in the first round and were eliminated.

As reigning Swiss Champions, Basel were qualified for the 1973–74 European Cup. In the first round, drawn against Iceland's champions Fram, Basel won with the aggregate score 11–2. In the second round they were drawn against Club Brugge. In the exciting second leg, Basel won 6–4, and thus 7–6 on aggregate. In the quarter-final Basel won the first leg against Celtic 3–2 and in the second leg Celtic won by the same score. During extra time Scottish international Steve Murray scored the decisive goal in the 114th minute. Celtic continued to the semi-final but did not reach the final.

=== Eighty-second, fifth Swiss Cup ===
Félix Musfeld was club chairman for the fifth consecutive period and Helmut Benthaus was first team manager for the tenth consecutive season. There were a few amendments to the team. Josef Kiefer, now coming to the end of his active career, went on to play for FC Breitenbach. Kiefer had been with the club for 12 seasons. Between the years 1962 and 1974 he had played a total of 355 games for Basel, 170 of these games were in the domestic league. He had won the championship five times and the Swiss Cup once. A number of other players also left the club, Teófilo Cubillas went on to Porto, Rudolf Wampfler to Fribourg, Peter Wenger went on to Nordstern Basel and Felix Tschudin moved on to local club SC Binningen. Incoming transfers included Fritz Wirth who joined on loan from Grenchen, Roland Schönenberger signed from Wangen bei Olten and Danish international Eigil Nielsen signed from Winterthur. Basel played a total of 51 games in their 1974–75 season. 26 in the domestic league, seven in the Swiss Cup, four in the Swiss League Cup, five in the Cup of the Alps and nine were friendly matches.

Zürich won the championship six points ahead of both BSC Young Boys who were second and Grasshopper Club who were third. Basel finished in fourth position with 31 points. They won 11 of their 26 league games, drew nine and lost six games. They scored a total of 49 goals conceding 33. Ottmar Hitzfeld was the team's top goal scorer with 13 league goals. The poor results in this and the two previous seasons were now also being reflected in the match attendances. Whereas in the 1971–72 season all but one match attracted more than 10,000 spectators, this season only two games were attended by more than 10,000 people. The average number of spectators had halved within just three years.

In the 50th Swiss Cup tournament Basel played the round of 32 on 21 September 1974 away against Chiasso in the Stadio Comunale and in the round 16 away against Zürich in the Letzigrund. The quarter-finals were two legged fixtures. Basel played the first leg on 30 October 1974 away in Stade de la Fontenette and the return leg on 3 November 1974 in the St. Jakob Stadium against Étoile Carouge. Both games ended with a 2–1 victory and so Basel qualified 4–2 on aggregate for the next round. The semi-finals were played in March against Chênois and was also a two legged fixture. In the first leg, played in Stade des Trois-Chêne, Basel achieved a 4–1 victory and the second leg ended with a 2–1 victory. The final was played on 31 March 1975 in the Wankdorf Stadium in Bern against Winterthur. Otto Demarmels scored the opening goal for Basel, E. Meyer equalised and so the game went into extra time. Walter Balmer scored the winning goal for Basel after 115 minutes. Basel were Swiss Cup winners for the fifth time in the club's history.

The Swiss League Cup ended for Basel in the semi-final as they lost 1–3 at home against Grasshopper Club.

=== Eighty-third season ===
Félix Musfeld was club chairman for the sixth consecutive period. Helmut Benthaus was first team manager for the eleventh consecutive season. There were a number of changes in the team during the pre-season. Goalkeeper Marcel Kunz would have liked to have stayed for another season, but his contract was not prolonged, so he moved on to Nordstern Basel one tier lower for one season before he retired from active football. Karl Odermatt would have stayed with the club, but the board of directors refused to pay the desired wages, so he moved to Young Boys. After four seasons with the club Ottmar Hitzfeld moved on to VfB Stuttgart, for him this was a large step forward in his career. Walter Balmer retired from active football, he had been with Basel seven seasons. Roland Paolucci was also reaching the end of his career, but he decided to add another season with Nordstern Basel. In the other direction Swiss international Peter Marti signed in from Swiss champions Zürich, Serge Muhmenthaler signed in from Young Boys and Walter Geisser joined from local club Nordstern Basel who played one tier lower. As seen in the previous years Benthaus relied on young players who came up from the reserve team to help, when needed in the first team.

Basel played a total of 56 games in their 1975–76 season. 26 in the domestic league, seven in the Swiss Cup, two in the Swiss League Cup, four in the Cup of the Alps, five in the Cup of the Alps, two in the 1975–76 European Cup Winners' Cup and 17 were friendly matches. Basel won six friendly games, drew six and lost five. In the Cup of the Alps Basel were in a group with Stade de Reims, Olympique Lyonnais and Lausanne-Sport. Two wins and two draws were enough for Basel to qualify for the final. But here they faced Servette in the Charmilles Stadium and lost 0–3. Basel played a good domestic league season, but reigning champions Zürich ran away with the title. Zürich won the championship with 44 points, five points clear of second placed Servette and ten points clear of third placed Basel.

As Swiss Cup winners the previous season, Basel qualified for the European Cup Winners' Cup. In the first round of the 1975–76 European Cup Winners' Cup Basel were drawn against Spanish Cup 1974–75 runners-up Atlético Madrid. Atlético had been beaten in the final by Real Madrid 3–4 after a penalty shoot out, but because Real became Spanish champions they thus entered the 1975–76 European Cup and Atlético competed in this competition as runners-up. The 1st leg was played in St. Jakob Stadium in front of 33,000 spectators and Basel took an early lead through Roland Schönenberger in the third minute. But a double strike from José Eulogio Gárate and Rubén Ayala in the 65th and 68th minute turned the game and Basel were defeated 2–3. In the return leg in Vicente Calderón Stadium, with over 25,000 spectators, Heraldo Bezerra put Atlético in the lead in the 74th minute, Otto Demarmels leveled the score, but this was not enough to stop Atlético advancing to the next round.

Basel started in the Swiss Cup tournament in the round of 32 on 25 September 1975 away against lower tier Grenchen and won this game 2–0 to qualify for the round of 16. Here they were drawn away against Young Boys and here the competition came to an end because they were defeated 1–3. In the Swiss League Cup Basel started in the round of 32 on 9 August away against St. Gallen and won 4–1. In the round of 16 Basel played away against second tier Young Fellows Zürich and won this easily 8–1. Lower tier Grenchen were drawn as hosts for the quarter-finals and Basel won this easily as well 6–2. Basel were drawn as hosts in the semi-final against Young Boys. There was no revenge for the defeat in the Swiss Cup earlier this season because YB won this clash as well, in overtime 3–5.

=== Eighty-fourth, seventh championship ===
René Theler was voted as new chairman at the AGM and took over from Félix Musfeld, who had been the club chairman over the previous six seasons. Helmut Benthaus was first team manager for the twelfth consecutive season. There were only a few changes in the team squad this season. Detlev Lauscher joined from 1. FC Köln and had played five seasons for 1. FC Köln in the German Bundesliga. Jean-Pierre Maradan joined from lower tier Grenchen and he quickly became a key player. Basel played a total of 56 games in their 1976–77 season. 33 in the domestic league, two in the Swiss Cup, two in the Swiss League Cup, four in the Cup of the Alps, four in the 1976–77 UEFA Cup and 11 were friendly matches. Basel won eight of their friendly games, drew two and lost one of them.

The Swiss Football Association had reformed the Swiss football league system that year reducing the number of teams in the Nationalliga A from 14 to 12. The 1976–77 Nationalliga A was played in two stages. The qualification phase was played by all teams in a double round-robin and, after completion, was divided into two groups. The first six teams contended in the championship group (with half of the points obtained in the qualification as bonus) and the positions seventh to twelfth contended the relegation group. Basel finished the qualification phase in second position with 33 points from 22 games and so entered the championship group with a bonus of 17. At the end of the championship phase Servette and Basel were level on 29 points. They therefore had to play a play-off for the championship. This play-off was held at the Wankdorf Stadium in Bern in front of 55,000 supporters. Basel won the match 2–1 and their seventh championship title.

In the Swiss Cup Basel won away from home against lower tier Fribourg in the round of 32 and in the round of 16 were drawn away against Xamax but were defeated. Young Boys won the competition. In the Swiss League Cup they won away from home against lower tier Grenchen. Then in the round of 16 were drawn away against Luzern and here they were defeated. Young Boys won this competition as well.

In the first round of the 1976–77 UEFA Cup Basel were drawn against Northern Ireland team Glentoran F.C. Basel won 5–3 on aggregate. In the second round they were drawn against Spanish team Athletic Bilbao. After a draw in the first leg, they but were defeated 1–3 in the second leg and thus 2–4 on aggregate.

=== Eighty-fifth season ===
René Theler was confirmed by the club members at the club's AGM for his second period as chairman. Helmut Benthaus was first team manager for the thirteenth consecutive season. During the off-season there were only two changes in the squad. Goalkeeper Hans Küng joined from Xamax and Hansruedi Schär joined from lower tier FC Oensingen. All other mutations were internal between the first team and the reserves. The team played a total of 54 games in their 1977–78 season. 32 in the domestic league, four in the Swiss Cup, four in the Swiss League Cup, two in the European Cup, four in the Cup of the Alps and eight were friendly matches.

Basel played in the 1977–78 Nationalliga A. This was contested by the first 10 teams from the previous season and the two newly promoted teams Etoile Carouge and Young Fellows Zürich. The domestic league was played in two stages. The qualification phase was played by all 12 teams in a double round robin, and after completion of this stage, the teams were divided into two groups. The first six teams contended in the championship group (with half the obtained points in the first stage as bonus) and the positions seventh to twelfth contended the relegation group (also with half the obtained points as bonus). Basel ended the qualification round in fourth position and ended the championship group in third position with 27 points, two points behind Grasshopper Club and one behind Servette. They failed their championship aim, being beaten 2–4 by the Grasshoppers in the very last game of the season. Basel scored a total of 74 goals, conceding 48, in their 32 domestic league games. Roland Schönenberger was the team's top goal scorer with 16 league goals.

In the first round of the Swiss Cup Basel were drawn against FC Lerchenfeld Thun and this was the first time that these two clubs had ever played against each other. Basel won this away game 4–2. In the next round they beat Zürich away 3–1 and St. Gallen at home 4–1 in the quarter-final. Therefore, Basel advanced to the semi-finals before being knocked out of the competition by Grasshopper Club. Servette won the competition this season. In the first round of the Swiss League Cup Basel were drawn against Wettingen. Also in this competition Basel advanced to the semi-finals before being knocked out. St. Gallen won the competition beating Grasshopper Club 3–2 in the final.

As reigning Swiss champions Basel were qualified for the 1977–78 European Cup and in the first round they were drawn against Austrian champions FC Wacker Innsbruck. After a home defeat and an away win, this competition was concluded after the first round, Wacker won 3–2 on aggregate. In the Coppa delle Alpi Basel played in group B together with Bastia, Olympique Lyonnais and Lausanne-Sport. But with only one win and three defeats they ended the group stage in last position in the table.

=== Eighty-sixth season ===
Again, René Theler was confirmed at the club's AGM for his third period as chairman. Helmut Benthaus was first team manager for the fourteenth consecutive season. There were only a few changes in the squad. Eigil Nielsen moved on to Luzern. Serge Muhmenthaler was forced to terminate his playing career early due to his injury. Muhmenthaler would return a few years later as a referee. Walter Mundschin retired from active football. During his time with Basel from 1965 to 1978, Mundschin played a total of 437 games and scored 67 goals. There were also a few new players in the squad. Robert Baldinger joined from Wettingen, Erwin Meyer joined from SC Emmen and Rolf Schönauer joined from local club SC Binningen. All other changes were internal between the first team and the reserves. Benthaus led the team in a total of 59 games in their 1978–79 season. 32 of these games were in the domestic league, three in the Swiss Cup, six in the Swiss League Cup, two in the 1978–79 UEFA Cup, four in the Cup of the Alps and 12 were friendly matches.

Basel played in the 1978–79 Nationalliga A. This was contested by the first 10 teams from the previous season and the newly promoted teams Nordstern Basel and Chiasso. After a double round-robin in the qualification phase, the top six teams played in a championship group for the title and the bottom six teams in the relegation group. The teams in these two groups started with the bonus of half the points from the qualifying phase (rounded up). Basel ended the qualification round in fourth position and finished the Championship Group in sixth position with 18 points. They ended the season 17 points behind championship winners Servette who won all ten matches in the championship stage.

In the first round of the Swiss Cup Basel were drawn against FC Glattbrugg and this was the first time that these two clubs had ever played against each other. The game was played on 7 October 1978 and Basel won 7–0. In the second round Basel were drawn away and won against Zürich. In the third round Basel were away against Xamax and were knocked out of the competition. In the final on 20 June 1979 in the Wankdorf Stadium in Bern Servette were matched against Young Boys and won the cup winning the game 3–2. The Cup winners were to qualify for the 1979–80 European Cup Winners' Cup, but because Servette became champions the runners-up inherited this slot. In the first round of the Swiss League Cup Basel were drawn against Grenchen. This was played as a two legged affair, winning the home game and losing away game, Basel advanced 4–3 on aggregate. Basel won in the round of 16 against Nordstern Basel. In the quarter-final they won against Luzern and in the semi-final they won against Xamax to reach the final. The final was played on 5 May 1979 in the Wankdorf Stadium. This was against Servette and after extra time the score was 2–2. In the end Servette won 4–3 on penalties and completed the national treble, Championship, Cup and League Cup.

In the 1978–79 UEFA Cup Basel were drawn against VfB Stuttgart. The first game was lost 2–3 in St. Jakob Stadium and the away game in the Neckarstadion was lost 1–4. VfB Stuttgart won 7–3 on aggregate and continued to the second round. In the Coppa delle Alpi (English Cup of the Alps) Basel played with Stade de Reims and Sochaux in Group B together with Lausanne-Sport. Lausanne-Sport won the group and thus advanced to play in the final only to lose this against the winners of group A, Servette FC, 0–4.

=== Eighty-seventh, eighth championship title ===
René Theler was the club's chairman for the fourth consecutive season. Helmut Benthaus was first team manager for the fifteenth consecutive season. There were a number of players that left the squad during the off-season. Midfield player Urs Siegenthaler moved on to Schaffhausen after eight years and 112 league games with the club. Stricker Roland Schönenberger moved on to Young Boys after four seasons, he had played 110 league games and scored 41 league goals. Defender Paul Fischli ended his professional career. After ten years with the club he moved on to local amateur team FC Münchenstein as player-coach. From 1968 and 1979, Fischli played a total of 395 games for Basel scoring a total of 22 goals. In the other direction the experienced René Hasler and youngster Ernst Schleiffer both signed in from Xamax. Joseph Küttel signed in from Young Boys. Two local players joined both from the other side of the border. French player Serge Gaisser joined in from St. Louis and German Manfred Jungk joined from SV Weil. Basel played a total of 57 games in their 1979–80 season. 36 matches were played in the domestic league, two in the Swiss Cup, one in the Swiss League Cup and 18 were friendly matches. The team scored a total of 160 goals and conceded 62. All of their friendly games were played away from home. Of their 18 test games, 14 were won, two were drawn and two ended with a defeat. One of the defeats was against the Swiss national team.

After the success of the 1976–77 season, Basel endured two seasons of below-par performances and mid-table finishes until glory returned. Following the poor two seasons before Basel started the season as outsiders. Reigning Champions Servette together with the two clubs Grasshopper Club Zürich and FC Zürich were favorites. Benthaus declared qualification to the UEFA Cup as the team's primary aim. Basel ended the qualification round in second position, two points behind Servette and one ahead of the Grasshoppers. In the championship group the points obtained in the qualification were halved as a bonus (rounded up). Basel won the Championship with 33 points, two ahead of both second place Grasshopper Club and third placed Servette. Basel scored a total of 91 goals conceding 38 in the 32 league games. This was the club's eighth championship title in their history and the seventh and last under trainer Benthaus.

All NLA teams entered the Swiss Cup in the round of 32. Basel were drawn away against Mendrisiostar where they won 3–1. In the second round, again away from home in the Wankdorf Stadium and this against Young Boys. In the Swiss League Cup Basel were also drawn away from home against the Young Boys. Basel lost both duels and thus without further cup matches to contest they had enough strength and energy to win the Swiss league championship.

=== Eighty-eighth season ===
Pierre Jacques Lieblich was voted as new club chairman, he replaced René Theler who stood down at the AGM. Helmut Benthaus was first team manager for the sixteenth consecutive season. There were only a few changes in the squad this off-season. Erwin Meyer moved on to Luzern and Robert Baldinger moved to lower tier Aarau. Serge Duvernois joined from Saint Louis and Martin Mullis joined from St. Gallen. Basel played a total of 52 games in their 1980–81 season. 26 matches were played in the domestic league, three in the Swiss Cup, one in the Swiss League Cup, four in the 1980–81 European Cup and 18 were friendly matches. Of their 18 test games, 10 were won, five were drawn and three ended with a defeat.

Basel played in the 1980–81 Nationalliga A. The league had been reformed and there were no more championship play-offs. Basel played a mediocre season and ended the Nationalliga in sixth position, 12 points behind Zürich who became champions. In their 26 league games Basel won nine, drew ten and lost seven matches, which meant that they totaled 28 points. They scored 48 goals, conceding 44. Erni Maissen was the team's top goalscorer scoring ten league goals.

Basel entered the Swiss Cup in the round of 32. Here they were drawn away against Fribourg and they won the match 3–0. In the round of 16 they were drawn at home against Martigny-Sports and this match was won 6–0. In the quarterfinal, on 28 March 1981, Basel were drawn to play away from home against Zürich in the Letzigrund. The hosts won the tie 3–0. Basel were out of the competition and Zürich continued on to the final and won the trophy. In first round of the Swiss League Cup Basel were also drawn away against Zürich. They lost the home game 1–2 and Zürich continued in this competition and won this trophy as well.

As reigning Swiss champions Basel were qualified for the 1980–81 European Cup. In the first round they were drawn against Club Brugge. The first leg was played at the Jan Breydel Stadium in Bruges and Basel won 1–0 through a goal scored by Erni Maissen in 65th minute. The return leg was won 4–1, the goals coming from Markus Tanner (14), Jörg Stohler (48), Arthur von Wartburg (55) and Walter Geisser (81) after Brugge had taken an early lead through Jan Ceulemans (3), but their goalkeeper Leen Barth was sent off in the 17th minute. In the second round Basel were drawn against Red Star Belgrade. Basel decided the first leg for themselves 1–0, the goal scored by Detlev Lauscher. In the second leg, however, Basel lost 0–2 and were eliminated from the competition.

=== Eighty-ninth season ===
Pierre Jacques Lieblich was club chairman for the second year running. Helmut Benthaus was first-team manager for the seventeenth consecutive season. During the off-season four players left the squad, Ernst Schleiffer moved on to Grenchen, Peter Marti to Aarau, Markus Tanner to Luzern and Joseph Küttel moved on to Lugano. During the season Hansruedi Schär was loaned out to Nordstern Basel and during the winter break Detlev Lauscher moved on to Luzern. In the other direction goalkeeper Walter Eichenberger joined from Young Boys and defender Bruno Graf joined from Chiasso. Basel also signed two youngsters, Alfred Lüthi from FC Subingen and Beat Sutter joined from local club FC Gelterkinden. The biggest transfer this summer was that of former West German international Harald Nickel from Borussia Mönchengladbach. Basel played a total of 54 games in their 1981–82 season. 30 matches were played in the domestic league, six in the Swiss Cup, three in the Swiss League Cup, five in the Cup of the Alps and 10 were friendly matches. Of their 10 test games, six were won and four ended with a defeat.

Basel played in the 1981–82 Nationalliga A. The league championship format was expanded from the 1980–81 season to include sixteen teams and the last two teams were to be relegated. Basel ended the season in eighth position, 21 points behind Grasshopper Club who became champions. In their 30 league games Basel won eleven, drew six and lost thirteen matches, which meant that they totaled 28 points.

Basel entered Swiss Cup in the round of 64. Here they were drawn away against Sursee and on 26 September they won the match 9–1. In the round of 32 they were drawn away against Bellinzona and this match was on 31 October and Basel won 1–0. In the round of 16 they were drawn away from home against Aarau on 30 March 1982 and this match was won 3–2. In the quarter-final Basel played at home against Lausanne-Sport and this ended with a 2–1 victory. The semi-final was played on 4 May in the St. Jakob Stadium against SR Delémont and Basel won 3–0. The Final, played in the Wankdorf Stadium, was against Sion. After a free kick on the sideline, in the 21st minute, a headed goal from Alain Balet secured Sion the trophy. In first round of the Swiss League Cup Basel were also drawn at home against Young Boys and a 1–0 victory took them to the next round. Here they played away against Grenchen and came away with a 2–1 victory. In the quarterfinal Basel played on the Stadion Brügglifeld but were eliminated by Aarau.

Basel played in the Coppa delle Alpi. They played together with Lausanne-Sport in Group A against Bordeaux and Bastia. Basel won the group and continued to the final, which was played on 29 September 1981 in Basel against Sochaux. The game ended 2–2 after extra time and Basel won on penalties.

== Ohlhauser, Künnecke, Müller, Benthaus ==
=== Ninetieth season ===
Roland Rasi was appointed as the club's chairman at the AGM, he replaced Pierre Jacques Lieblich who stood down. Rainer Ohlhauser was the new first team manager. He had taken over from Helmut Benthaus, who had been manager for 17 years between 1965 and 1982, and who had moved on to take over as manager of VfB Stuttgart. A number of players left the squad, Ernst Schleiffer moved on to Grenchen, Peter Marti went to Aarau, Markus Tanner to Luzern and Joseph Küttel to Lugano. In the other direction Winfried Berkemeier joined from Young Boys, Ruedi Zbinden joined from local rivals Nordstern Basel and Nicolas Keller joined from Chiasso. There were also a number of youngsters who advanced from the youth team, Roger Bossert, Guido Rudin and Thomas Hauser. Basel played a total of 51 games this season. 30 matches were played in the domestic league, three in the Swiss Cup, four in the Cup of the Alps and 14 were friendly matches. The Swiss League Cup was no longer played this season. Of their 14 test games, ten were won, two drawn and two ended with a defeat.

The 1982–83 Nationalliga A was contested by 16 teams. Basel ended the season in eleventh position. In their 30 league games Basel won ten, drew five and lost fifteen matches, obtaining 25 points. They were 24 points behind Grasshopper Club Zürich who won the championship.

Basel entered into the Swiss Cup in the round of 64. Here they were drawn away against FC Breitenbach and on 9 October they won the match 4–0. In the round of 32 Basel were drawn at home against Lausanne-Sport. The game was played on 12 March 1983 and Basel won 2–1. On 4 April the away defeat against Mendrisio meant the end of this cup season. In the Coppa delle Alpi Basel were drawn against AJ Auxerre and Metz. Two draws against Auxerre and one victory and a defeat against Metz left them in third position in the Swiss teams group table. Xamax and Nantes played in the final.

=== Ninety-first season ===
Urs Gribi was the newly appointed club chairman, he replaced Roland Rasi who stood down at the AGM after just one year as chairmanship. Ernst August Künnecke was appointed as Basel's new first team manager and Emil Müller was appointed as his assistant. They had taken over from Rainer Ohlhauser, who had been manager for just the previous season. Künnecke had not played as a professional footballer, but had played in the highest amateur levels before becoming professional head coach in Belgium. A number of players left the squad. Hans Küng retired after having been with the club six years. Peter Marti move to Aarau after having been with the club seven years. Serge Duvernois and Serge Gaisser moved on to play for FC Mulhouse. Further Bruno Graf moved to Wettingen, Winfried Berkemeier to FC Raron and Roger Bossert to local club FC Laufen. In the other direction a number of new players joined the club. Three came from Wettingen, goalkeeper Urs Suter and the two defenders Martin Andermatt and Rolf Lauper. Uwe Dreher joined from Stuttgarter Kickers and René Botteron from 1. FC Nürnberg. Two youngsters were brought in from local clubs, Thomas Süss from Nordstern Basel and Fredy Grossenbacher from Concordia Basel. Another youngster, Peter Nadig, advanced from Basel's own youth team.

Künnecke coached Basel in a total of 58 games in their 1983–84 season. 30 matches were played in the domestic league, two in the Swiss Cup and 26 were friendly matches. Of their 26 test games, 17 ended with a victory, one was drawn and eight ended with a defeat.

The 1983–84 Nationalliga A was contested by 16 teams. As the season advanced it became increasingly apparent that Künnecke's ideas were not reaching the entire team squad at all times. Basel's youngsters played well during this season, Fredy Grossenbacher, Martin Jeitziner, Peter Nadig, Thomas Hauser and Beat Sutter advanced well under Künnecke. But Künnecke's ideas were not being accepted by the older, experienced players. At home, in the St. Jakob Stadium the team was playing well and winning the games, the first five home games were all won. However, the first seven away games all ended with a defeat. After the winter break Basel lost their first home game against La Chaux-de-Fonds 0–1. Künnecke reacted immediately and this was the last game that the three veterans Arthur von Wartburg, Jörg Stohler and Jean-Pierre Maradan played in the team. The supporters had noted the differences and the final home game of the season attracted only 2,000 spectators. Basel ended the season in ninth position. In their 30 league games Basel won eleven matches, drew six and lost thirteen. Basel obtained 28 points, scored 55 and conceded 59 goals. They were 16 points behind Grasshopper Club and Servette both of whom finished level on 44 points. A play-off match was to decide the championship and this was won by Grasshoppers who became champions for the second consecutive year.

Basel entered into the Swiss Cup in the round of 64 and here they were drawn away against local lower league club FC Birsfelden. The match was a one-sided affair and Basel won 8–0. In the round of 32 they had a home fixture against Luzern but were beaten 0–3. Servette won the Cup beating Lausanne-Sport 1–0 in the final.

=== Ninety-second season ===
For the second year running the club's chairman was Urs Gribi. It was Ernst August Künnecke's second year as first team manager with Emil Müller as his assistant. Künnecke made amendments to the team, Walter Geisser retired and Jean-Pierre Maradan, Jörg Stohler as well as Arthur von Wartburg who had been excluded from the squad the previous season all moved on to Grenchen. Künnecke persuaded Adrie van Kraay to join the team from Waterschei Thor. The youngsters Beat Feigenwinter (from Nordstern Basel), Livio Bordoli (from Hessen Kassel) and Ertan Irizik (from Concordia Basel) were transferred in. Basel's own youngsters Peter Nadig, Beat Sutter, Thomas Hauser, Fredy Grossenbacher and Dominique Herr were formed into team leaders. In this season Basel played a total of 63 games. 30 matches were played in the domestic league, three in the Swiss Cup and 30 were friendly matches. Of their 30 test games, 24 ended with a victory, two were drawn, four ended with a defeat.

The 1984–85 Nationalliga A was contested by 16 teams, including the top 14 clubs from the previous season and the two sides promoted from the second level, Nationalliga B, the previous season, these being SC Zug and Winterthur. But the good results in pre-season test matches, including a draw against Borussia Dortmund and victories against Karlsruher SC, SC Freiburg and Bayern Munich could not be carried over into the domestic league. Basel lost three of their first four matches. Then, following a run of five defeats and five draws with only one win, the team suffered one defeat too many against Lausanne-Sport on the 11 November. Basel's club chairman Urs Gribi fired Künnecke. The SC Zug match was declared forfait at a later date. Gribi installed Müller as head coach until the end of the season and Müller was able to lead the team away from the relegation zone. Basel ended the season in eighth position, 15 points behind Servette Genève who became Swiss champions that year. In their 30 league matches Basel won eleven, drew nine and lost ten games.

Basel entered the Swiss Cup in the round of 64 with an away game against lower classed FC Dürrenast. This was won 4–0. In the second round they had a home match, also against a lower classed team FC Langenthal. This match resulted in a 6–0 victory. However, with the third round home game against Servette Basels cup season came to an end because they lost the match 0–1.

=== Ninety-third, mediocre ===
Urs Gribi was the club's chairman for the third consecutive year. Helmut Benthaus returned as first team manager, after his successful three-year term with VfB Stuttgart in which they won the Bundesliga in the 1983–84 season. He took over from caretaker manager Emil Müller. A number of players left the squad. Former Netherlands international Adrie van Kraay retired from active football. Swiss international player Martin Andermatt moved on to Grasshopper Club and Livio Bordoli moved on to Locarno. Two players, Beat Feigenwinter and Nicolas Keller, left the first team squad and went to play for the reserve team. In the other direction Gerd Strack signed in from 1. FC Köln, André Ladner and Marco Schällibaum both signed in from Grasshopper Club, Francois Laydu signed in from La Chaux-de-Fonds and local player Enrique Mata joined after three-season with Neuchâtel Xamax. Further, another local lad Stefano Ceccaroni returned from his one-season loan to Baden. In this season Basel played a total of 51 games. 30 matches were played in the domestic league, five in the Swiss Cup and 16 were friendly matches. Of their 16 test games, 12 ended with a victory, one was drawn, three ended with a defeat.

Basel played in the 1985–86 Nationalliga A, which was contested by 16 teams. Basel ended the season in tenth position, 14 points behind BSC Young Boys who became that season's champions. In their 30 league championship matches Basel won ten games, drew ten and also lost ten, which meant that they obtained 30 points.

Basel entered the Swiss Cup in the round of 64 with an away game against lower classed Concordia Basel. The game was played in the St. Jakob Stadium, in which Concordia had home team status, in front of 1,800 spectators and Basel won 9–1. They continued to the round of 32 in which they had a home game against FC Vernier, which was won 6–0. In the round of 16 they had a home game against Lausanne Sports, which ended in a 4–1 victory. The quarterfinal was played as visitors to lower classed FC Lengnau and with a 6–0 victory, Basel advanced to the semifinal. The semifinal was played at home in front of 12,000 spectators against Servette on 15 April 1986 and Servette took an early three-goal lead. A hat-trick from Gerd Strack in the last 22 minutes of regular time meant that the match had to go into overtime. but a penalty conceded in the 4th minute of extra time meant that Basel did not reach the final. Sion beat Servette in the final and won the Cup.

== Financial problems, then relegation ==
=== Ninety-fourth season ===
Peter Max Sutter was the club's newly appointed chairman. Helmut Benthaus had returned as first team manager the season before, this was his second consecutive season as coach. There were a number of changes in the team. The defenders Ertan Irizik moved on to St. Gallen, Francois Laydu moved on to Locarno, Stefano Ceccaroni moved to FC Laufen and Alfred Lüthi moved on to Grenchen. Further the midfielder Martin Jeitziner moved on to Young Boys, and the two forwards Beat Sutter moved on to Xamax and Ruedi Zbinden moved on to Grenchen. In the other direction, Stefan Bützer who had won the championship with the Young Boys the previous season signed in for the club. Then Jean-Pierre François and Markus Füri both signed in from local team Concordia Basel and Markus Hodel signed in from local club Nordstern Basel. Further Bruno Hänni joined from lower-tier club FC Oensingen, and Patrick Mäder arrived as reserve goalkeeper from FC Schaffhausen. In this season Basel played a total of 52 games. 30 matches were played in the domestic league and then another four in the promotion/relegation play-offs, three games were in the Swiss Cup and 15 were friendly matches. Of their test games, nine ended with a victory, four were drawn and two ended with a defeat.

Basel played a mediocre season, although they won only two of their first ten games, they were always placed in the middle of the table and kept this position after the winter break with three wins against lower placed teams. but seven defeats in the last ten games meant they slipped in the table. Basel ended the main season with only 24 points in 12th position and so had to enter into this knock-out round. Here they were drawn against Bulle (3rd in the Nationallaiga B) in a two-legged promotion/relegation play-off semi-final. Both games ended with a two all draw, but decisively Basel defeated Bulle 5–3 on penalties. Basel then defeated FC Wettingen 8–2 on aggregate (1–2 and 7–0) in one of the two promotion/relegation finals and managed to save their slot in the highest tier of Swiss football. Xamax won the championship.

In the Swiss Cup Basel entered in the round of 64 with an away game against Nationalliga B team FC Köniz and Basel won 9–2. They continued to the round of 32 in which they had a home game against third tier Fribourg and this was won 3–1. The cup season came to an end in the round of 16 as Basel lost the home game against lower classed Kriens. Young Boys and Servette advanced to the final, which was traditionally always played in the Wankdorf Stadium in Bern. After 90 minutes the game ended 1–1, but YB won the trophy 4–2 after extra time.

=== Ninety-fifth, relegated ===
Charles Röthlisberger was the club's newly appointed chairman. Following the poor previous season, as the team only escaped relegation in the play-out round, Helmut Benthaus retired as head coach and there were also a number of players who left the club. Former Swiss international midfielder René Botteron retired from active football. German former international Gerd Strack returned to Germany to play for Fortuna Düsseldorf. Another German player also moved to Germany, Thomas Süss moved on to play for Karlsruher SC. French player Jean-Pierre François moved back to France to play for AS Saint-Étienne. Also Fredy Grossenbacher and Marco Schällibaum both moved to Servette, André Ladner moved to Lugano and Erni Maissen transferred to Young Boys. Further reserve goalkeeper Patrick Mäder moved on to Baden and Luiz Gonçalo moved on to Old Boys. Urs Siegenthaler was appointed as new first team coach and because 11 players left the squad he had to build a new team. But the club was suffering financial difficulties and there was no money to spend. However, one interesting transfer was that of Scottish Gordon Smith coming from Admira Wacker. Another interesting transfer was that of German Uwe Dittus from FC Winterslag. Another two experienced players were Frank Eggeling joined from Grenchen and Ruedi Zahner from Aarau. All other new players were youngsters, goalkeeper Bernard Pulver joined from lower tier FC Bern, Peter Bernauer from German team SV 08 Laufenburg, Remo Steiner from local club FC Aesch, Ralph Thoma from local club FC Rheinfelden, Mathias Wehrli from local club FC Laufen. Six players were brought up from the youth team. These being Philipp Baumberger, Massimo Ceccaroni, Bernd Schramm, Adrian Sedlo, Fotios Karapetsas and Patrick Rahmen. Another interesting transfer was that of Varadaraju Sundramoorthy from Singapore FA. Sundramoorthy became only the second player from Singapore to play in Europe.

The Swiss Football Association (SFV) had changed the form of the domestic league for this season. The number of teams in the Nationalliga A had been reduced from 16 to 12. Basel started the season badly, losing the first five league games straight off, conceding 17 goals, scoring just three. In the third round on 15 August they were defeated 1–9 by Xamax. As of today,this remains Basel's heaviest defeat in domestic league history. Xamax manager at that time was Gilbert Gress. The team never recovered from the bad start and even lost seven of the eleven return games. They ended the qualifying stage of the championship with just 13 points in 11th position. This meant that they had to play in one of the two promotion/relegation groups. Despite a good start in this phase, they won their first three matches, they were defeated by Bellinzona and then by Wettingen. Basel thus lost contact to these two teams in the top two positions in the league table. The first two places would qualify for next season's top flight. In their last six games Basel could not achieve a single victory and therefore they slipped to fifth position in the table and were relegated to the Nationalliga B.

In the Swiss Cup, in round of 64, Basel were drawn against local rivals Old Boys. The game ended with a 1–2 defeat and therefore the cup season was ended much earlier than expected. In the final Grasshopper Club won the cup with a 2–0 victory over Schaffhausen.

=== Ninety-sixth, Nationalliga B ===
Charles Röthlisberger was the club's chairman and this was his second year in this position. Following their relegation the season before this was their first season in the second tier of Swiss football since the 1945–46 season. Urs Siegenthaler was first-team coach for the second consecutive season. Due to the relegation there were many modifications in the squad. Ruedi Zahner retired from active football. Both goalkeepers moved on, Bernard Pulver to Young Boys and Urs Suter to Zürich. Stefan Bützer and Frank Eggeling both transferred to Emmenbrücke. Thomas Hauser and Varadaraju Sundramoorthy went to play for local rivals Old Boys. Dominique Herr moved on to Lausanne-Sport. The two forwards Adrian Knup transferred to Aarau and Peter Nadig to Luzern. Scottish ex-international Gordon Smith moved home to Scotland and joined Stirling Albion before ending his football career. Adrian Sedlo moved to Mulhouse and with four other players the contracts were not prolonged.

The club's financial problems had worsened during the previous few seasons, this also due to the sinking number of spectators. But because an immediate return to the top flight was the priority, 12 new players were signed in. Goalkeeper Remo Brügger was signed from Luzern and his back up Roger Glanzmann from FC Therwil. The experienced players Andre Rindlisbacher transferred in from Aarau, Rolf Baumann from VfB Stuttgart, Mario Moscatelli from St. Gallen and Lucio Esposito from Luzern. There were a number of new players who joined from lower division clubs. For example Michael Syfrig, who had played a big role in the promotion of FC Glarus the previous season, signed his first professional contract. Then local youngsters Germano Fanciulli joined from local rivals Old Boys and Andre Cueni from FC Laufen. Further Beat Aebi came from FC Volketswil, Kurt Spirig came from Diepoldsau and Patrick Liniger was brought from the youth team.

Basel were assigned to the East group. They ended their 22 matches in the Qualifying Phase with 14 victories, four draws and four defeats with 32 points. They were group winners. Thus Basel qualified for the Promotion group. Basel were assigned to group A. Also qualified for this group from the Nationalliga B were Zürich, CS Chênois, Grenchen, ES Malley and the Old Boys. The team's goal scoring quality was missed during the Promotion stage. In the fifth, sixth and seventh round Basel lost the two away games against Lausanne-Sports 1–4 and St. Gallen 0–3, as well as the home match against local rivals Old Boys 0–1, therefore losing very valuable points. Basel ended the group with just 19 scored goals and just 14 obtained points in fourth position and thus they missed promotion.

Basel entered the Swiss Cup in the second round. Here they were drawn away against local team Oberwil. The game was won easily, 5–0. In the next round Basel were drawn against higher classed Young Boys. Basel mastered their opponents well, winning 4–1. In the round of 32 and round of 16 Basel had two ties against lower-tier teams winning both to qualify for the quarterfinals. Here their cup season came to an end because they lost against top-tier team Aarau.

=== Ninety-seventh, missed promotion ===
Charles Röthlisberger was the club's chairman for the second consecutive year. For the third consecutive season Urs Siegenthaler was first-team coach. After missing promotion the season before the club's repeated priority aim was to return to the top flight of Swiss football. Due to the poor results during October Urs Siegenthaler lost his position as first team coach and in November he was replaced by Ernst August Künnecke. As was previously noted during the off-season period over the previous few years, again this season there were many changes in the squad. Remo Brügger, who had recovered from his car accident injuries, moved on to St. Gallen. This was in a player swap with goalkeeper pendant Thomas Grüter who did not want to return there, following his six-month loan with Basel, following Brügger's accident. Michael Syfrig moved on to higher tier Aarau and Lucio Esposito also moved on to a higher-tier club, Bellinzona. Seven other players left the squad because their contracts had not been renewed. In the other direction Erni Maissen returned from Young Boys. Ruedi Zbinden returned to the club and Sascha Reich signed in from Bellinzona. Miodrag Đurđević was taken on contract from Dinamo Zagreb and Uwe Wassmer from Schalke 04. Further there were the signings of young local newcomers, like Manfred Wagner from FC Steinen-Höllstein, Vittorio Gottardi from SC Dornach, Jörg Heuting from Concordia Basel and René Spicher from Old Boys. Other newcomers were Olaf Berg from Viktoria Buchholz and Boris Mancastroppa from Red Star Zürich.

The 24 teams in the Nationalliga B were divided into two groups, an east and a west group, to first play a qualification round. In the second stage the tops six teams in each group and the last four team of the Nationalliga A would play a promotion/relegation round, also divided into two groups. The top two teams in each group would play in the top flight the next season. Basel were assigned to the West group. The Qualifying Phase started well and after ten rounds with six victories and only one defeat Basel led the group. Then however, a run of bad results, including home defeats against lower positioned teams ES Malley and Etoile Carouge and a 4–0 dubbing away against Yverdon-Sports cost head-coach Urs Siegenthaler his job. The team ended their 22 matches in the Qualifying Phase with 11 victories, five draws and six defeats with 27 points in a disappointing fifth position in the league table. Basel qualified for the promotion stage and were assigned to group A. Basel started well, winning the first four matches, but could only manage draws at home against both Servette and Zürich. The return matches against these two teams both ended in defeats and thus Basel could only reach third position in the table behind these two rivals and thus missed promotion.

Basel entered into the Swiss Cup in the 2nd principal round. Here they were drawn away against lower tier FC Moutier. The game was won convincingly 8–0 with seven different goal scorers. In the third round they were drawn against lower tier SC Burgdorf and which they also won easily, 3–0. In the round of 32 they were drawn away against Schaffhausen. Despite an early red card for Miodrag Đurđević, the match ended with a 1–0 victory. In the next round Basel had an away game against Bulle and mastered this with a 6–0 victory. Basel advanced through the first four rounds without conceding a single goal and had scored 18, with 11 different goal scorers. However, in the quarterfinals Basels cup season came to an end after a 0–1 defeat away from home in the Hardturm Stadium against higher tier Grasshopper Club. The Grasshoppers went on to win the trophy, for the third season in a row, beating Xamax 2–1 in the final. In fact the Grasshoppers achieved the national double that season.

=== Ninety-eighth, missed promotion ===
Following their relegation in the 1987–88 season this was their third season in the second tier of Swiss football. Charles Röthlisberger was the club's chairman for the third consecutive year. Ernst August Künnecke returned to the club, having taken over from Urs Siegenthaler as first-team coach during the previous. After missing promotion the previous two seasons, the club's repeated priority aim was to return to the top flight of Swiss football. Only a few players left the team. Andre Rindlisbacher transferred to Bellinzona, Uwe Wassmer to Aarau and Ralph Thoma returned to his club of origin FC Rheinfelden. Rolf Baumann ended his active football career and returned to his hometown club VfL Kirchheim/Teck as head-coach. Four other players left the squad because their contracts were not renewed. In the other direction Brian Bertelsen and Reto Baumgartner moved in from Wettingen. Maximilian Heidenreich transferred in from Hannover 96. Three young players came in from local, lower-tier teams, Roman Künzli from FC Breitenbach, Roman Hangarter from FC Brüttisellen and Christian Marcolli from FC Aesch. Seven young players were brought up from the Basel youth team.

Basel were assigned to the South East group. The first stage ran very moderately, there was no consistency in their games and matches were lost that should have been won. They ended their 22 matches in the Qualifying Phase with 9 victories, 8 draws and 5 defeats with 26 points in a disappointing fourth position in the league table. Basel qualified for a Promotion group and were assigned to group A. Also qualified for this group from the Nationalliga B were Chiasso, Yverdon-Sports, Fribourg, Baden and Etoile Carouge. Fighting against their relegation from the Nationalliga A were St. Gallen and Wettingen. At the start of this phase Basel lost two games, away against Yverdon-Sports and at home against St. Gallen and therefore they were in arrears right from the beginning. Even the away victory against Wettingen didn't help much, because they were defeated at home by FC Baden just two rounds later. A few weeks later the back to back home defeat against Wettingen and the defeat in the Espenmoos against St. Gallen decided the promotion/relegation phase to the benefit of these two teams. Basel ended their 14 matches in the promotion/relegation Phase with just four victories, four draws, suffering six defeats with 12 points in a very disappointing fourth position in the league table and missed promotion again.

In the Swiss Cup second round Basel were drawn with an away game against lower tier, local club FC Pratteln. But Basel were sent home suffering an embarrassing 4–0 defeat. A red card for Peter Bernauer just after half time, as the game was still goalless, made Basel very unsure. Pratteln took the lead and Basel were not able to give an adequate answer. In fact, in the last few minutes of the game, they fell completely apart and gave up two counter goals within less than 60 seconds. Sion won the cup, beating Young Boys 3–2 in the final.

=== Ninety-ninth, missed promotion ===
Charles Röthlisberger was the club's chairman for the fourth consecutive year. Ernst August Künnecke was first-team coach for the second consecutive season. After missing promotion in the previous season, the club's repeated priority aim was to return to the top flight of Swiss football. There were a number of changes in the squad. Erni Maissen retired from his professional playing career. Between the years 1975 to 1982, 1983 to 1987 and again from 1989 to 1991 Maissen played a total of 551 games for Basel scoring a total of 222 goals. Enrique Mata also retired from his professional playing career and moved on to FC Laufen. Further players who left the club were Sascha Reich and Patrick Rahmen who both transferred to Young Boys. Brian Bertelsen left the club as well and transferred to St. Gallen, Germano Fanciulli moved on to play for Grenchen and Roman Hangarter returned to FC Brüttisellen. The contracts with Roman Künzli and Patrick Liniger were not prolonged. In the other direction Patrick's brother Micha Rahmen joined from Grasshopper Club, Robert Kok transferred in from Zürich and André Sitek joined from Baden. A number of youngsters joined from their local clubs, Olivier Bauer and Christian Marcolli joined from FC Aesch, Walter Bernhard joined from SV Muttenz, Adrian Jenzer joined from Rapid Ostermundigen, Mourad Bounoua came from French club Mulhouse, Thomas Schweizer from German club SC Freiburg and Gilbert Epars came from Servette. There were also a number of youngsters who were brought up internally.

The 24 teams in the Nationalliga B were divided into two groups, a South/East and a West group. Basel was assigned to the West group. Also in this group were local rivals Old Boys. In the two local duals, Basel lost the away game against the Old Boys, 0–4, and could only manage a goalless draw against them in their home stadium. For Basel the season ran well, despite three defeats in the first six games, including this nasty defeat against the Old Boys, Basel had a good run staying unbeaten for the next 15 rounds, winning 11 of these matches. Basel then ended the Qualifying Phase in top position in the league table. In the 22 matches Basel totaled 31 points with 13 victories, five draws and four defeats. Basel qualified for the promotion stage and were assigned to group A. However, the promotion-relegation phase started badly; Basel could only draw four games and lost two from the first six games. Trainer Ernst August Künnecke was released from his position. The two former players Karl Odermatt and Bruno Rahmen took over as coaches ad interim until the end of the season. The results there after were better, but the gap to the leading teams could not be closed. The team finished the 14 matches in this stage with just four victories, six draws, suffering four defeats with 14 points in a very disappointing fourth position in the league table. Therefore, they missed their aim of promotion once again.

In the second round of the Swiss Cup Basel were drawn away from home against lower-tier FC Einsiedeln and in the round of 64 away against lower tier FC Willisau. Both games were won easily (6–2 and 2–0). In the round of 32 Basel were drawn at home against Bulle and the game ended with a 1–1 draw after extra time. Basel secured the victory in the penalty shoot-out. In the next round they were drawn at home against FC Bern (5–1 victory). But in the quarterfinals Basel were drawn at home against Lugano. Because this match ended in a 2–3 defeat they were eliminated. Lugano continued and later reached the final, but in the final they were beaten 3–1, after extra time, by cup-winners Luzern.

=== Anniversary 100th season ===
Peter Epting took over as the club's chairman that season from Charles Röthlisberger at the AGM in March 1993. Friedel Rausch was appointed as new trainer, following the interim coaches Karl Odermatt and Bruno Rahmen. The duo had taken over ad interim after Ernst-August Künnecke had been sacked toward the end of the previous season. A number of players left the squad. Robert Kok, who had only been with the club the previous season, retired from active football. Three players moved on to Germany; Mourad Bounoua transferred to TuS Celle, Maximilian Heidenreich and Thomas Schweizer both moved on to SC Freiburg. Other players transferred within the Swiss League, Walter Bernhard transferred to Fribourg, Gilbert Epars transferred to Urania Genève Sport and Boris Mancastroppa to Schaffhausen. In the other direction Christian Reinwald joined from Chur as the new second goalkeeper. Then there were two transfers from Germany, Dirk Lellek transferred in from VfL Osnabrück and Ørjan Berg transferred in from 1860 Munich. Within the Swiss League, Mario Uccella joined from Winterthur, Marco Walker from Lugano and Pierre-André Schürmann from Lausanne-Sport. Two players joined from Xamax, Admir Smajić transferred in and Frédéric Chassot on loan. Patrick Rahmen returned to his club of origin from Young Boys and youngster Gaetano Giallanza signed his first professional contract, coming from Old Boys.

The 24 teams in the Nationalliga B were divided into two groups. Basel were assigned to the West group, together with local rivals Old Boys. In the two local duals, Basel won both games and both with 3–0. Basel ended the Qualifying Phase in second position in the league table. Basel thus qualified for the promotion stage and were assigned to group A. Further teams assigned to this group from the Nationalliga B were Delémont, Chênois, Luzern, Locarno and Wil. Assigned to this group and fighting against relegation from the Nationalliga A were Bulle and Grasshopper Club. Basel ended the promotion stage in a very disappointing fourth position in the league table and missed promotion yet again.

Basel entered the Swiss Cup in the second round. Here they were drawn away from home against lower-tier local team FC Baudepartement Basel and they won 6–0. In the third round they were drawn at home to local rivals Old Boys and this was won 4–0. Basel were drawn away against lower-tier SC Young Fellows Juventus in the third round and this was won 3–0. In the round of 16 they were again drawn at home, also against a lower-tier team, FC Savièse. All four games were won without the team conceding a single goal. However, in the quarterfinals Basel played at home against higher-tier Xamax. Because this match ended with a 2–3 defeat they were eliminated from the competition.Xamax were defeated in the semi-final by Lugano, who went on to win the final 4–1 against Grasshopper Club.

=== 101st, promotion ===
Peter Epting was confirmed as the club's chairman at the AGM for the second period. Claude Andrey was appointed as new first team trainer. He came from Sion where he had been trainer for the previous six months and he came as replacement for Friedel Rausch who had only been trainer with the club for the previous season. A number of players left the club during the off-season. Last season's top scorer André Sitek moved on to score his goals for Locarno, another goal scorer Frédéric Chassot returned to Neuchâtel Xamax after his loan period had expired and defender Dirk Lellek transferred to VfB Oldenburg. Christian Marcolli and Manfred Wagner both moved to local rivals to Old Boys and Patrick Rahmen moved on to play for SR Delémont. In the other direction Swiss international goalkeeper Stefan Huber transferred in from Lausanne-Sport. Two new defender were also transferred in, Andre Meier from Chiasso and Samir Tabakovic from NK Belišće. The midfield was strengthened with the signings of Mario Cantaluppi from Grasshopper Club, Sergei Derkach from Dynamo Moscow and Didier Gigon from Lausanne-Sport. More notable transfers were those of Swiss international strikers Dario Zuffi and Philippe Hertig who both came from Lugano.

Basel were assigned to the Nationalliga B West group, together with local rivals Old Boys and SR Delémont. Basel had a slow start to the season with two home defeats against Old Boys and Grenchen in the first three games of the season. But the newly formed team soon found themselves and they recorded eight victories in the next nine games. Etoile Carouge ended the qualifying phase as group winners, two points above second placed Basel. As second placed team in their qualifying group, Basel qualified for the promotion stage. To help with their promotion attempt Axel Kruse was signed in on loan from VfB Stuttgart until the end of the season, but because of injuries he only played three league games. Basel's start in the phase of a somewhat slow stance and three draws in the first four matches and despite an away defeat against Xamax in round six they played well at the top of the group table. Not being defeated in the last eight matches, winning five, drawing three, they ended the group in first place. They were level on points with St. Gallen and Xamax and won promotion.

Basel entered the Swiss Cup in the second round. Here they were drawn away from home in the Herti Allmend Stadion against lower-tier team Zug and final result was 10–0 win. In the third round Basel were drawn at home in the St. Jakob Stadium against higher tier Aarau and despite being a goal down through an own goal at half time, Basel again turned up the pressure again in the second half and turned the match around to win 4–1. In round four another higher-tier team were to visit Basel in their home stadium, but Basel won 2–0 against Lausanne-Sport. Round five gave higher tier Xamax the journey to St. Jakob Stadium and the host team achieved a 1–0 victory. The fourth higher top flight team to make the visit to the stadium was Yverdon-Sports. The match was goalless after 90 minutes, thus went into over-time. Zuffi gave the hosts a 1–0 victory after extra time with a goal in the 118th minute. The semi-final also gave Basel a home game against Schaffhausen, who had suffered a 3–0 defeat here in the domestic league exactly two weeks earlier. But this time the hosts played under capabilities, the game ended goalless, even after extra time. The penalty shoot out was decisive. Schaffhausen goalkeeper Erich Hürzeler held striker Zuffi's attempt, Basel keeper Huber held Engesser's attempt and after 12 penalties things were level at five all. Keeper Hürzeler then saved Tabakovic's attempt, and Steffen Ziffert's final penalty secured the upset for Schaffhausen.

=== 102nd, Nationalliga A ===
Peter Epting was the club's chairman for the third period. Claude Andrey was the Basel trainer for the second consecutive season. After gaining promotion during the last season, the club's priority aim was to remain in the top flight of Swiss football. Andrey tried to maintain squad continuity following the team's promotion and only a relatively low number of players left the squad. Axel Kruse's loan period had ended and he returned to VfB Stuttgart and Sergei Derkach returned to Dynamo Moscow. Reto Baumgartner retired from active football and turned to professional beach soccer and played for the Swiss national team. Micha Rahmen and Mario Uccella moved on to local amateur club FC Riehen, and Olivier Bauer and Frank Wittmann moved on to local team Old Boys. In the other direction Lars Olsen signed in from Seraing, Asif Šarić signed in from Arminia Bielefeld, Mart van Duren came from Groningen and Alexandre Rey transferred in from Sion.

Two further youngsters joined the team during the winter break. Because Goalkeeper Stefan Huber was injured, Andreas Niederer was signed in as second goalie from local amateur club FC Allschwil and he came to four appearances after second keeper Thomas Grüter also injured himself. Hakan Yakin signed his first professional contract in January 1995 coming in from local club Concordia Basel. He played his league debut for Basel on 12 April 1995 in the match against Lausanne Sports. He was brought on in the 60th minute as replacement for Alexandre Rey. With his first touch of the ball, just 18 seconds later, Yakin scored his first league goal for his new club with a header.

The 1994–95 Nationalliga A was contested by 12 teams, but for Basel the season started very badly, the team lost four of the first six games and they did not record a win until the 9th round. After the first half of the qualifying phase, Basel and Young Boys were joint bottom of the league table with just six points. The second half of the Qualifying Phase was better and Basel rose to 7th position in the league table. During the entire phase Basel scored just 18 goals, thus being the poorest attacking team and conceded just 15, thus being the defensive best in the league.

Basel qualified for the Champions Round. Here things started better, three wins in the first three games. But two consecutive defeats at Lugano (1–4) (1–4) and away to Xamax (1–5), as well as the return game home defeat against Lugano, put an end to the hopes of a higher placed finish. Basel ended the 1994–95 Nationalliga A in seventh position in the table, but were qualified for the newly UEFA-administered Intertoto Cup 1995.

In the Swiss Cup Basel were drawn away from home against lower tier FC Bözingen 34 in the 3rd principal round. This resulted in a 5–0 victory. In the 4th round Basel faced Aarau at home in the St. Jakob Stadium and won 3–0. In the round of 16 Basel played in the Stadion Allmend but lost 0–2 to the hosts Luzern. Sion became cup winners, beating Grasshopper Club 4–2 in the final.

== Stabilisation ==
=== 103rd season ===
Peter Epting was the club's chairman for the fourth period. Claude Andrey was again the club's manager, this was his third period as head-coach. There were a few players that left the squad. Mart van Duren retired from active football, Martin Jeitziner also retired from professional football and moved on to Old Boys, Ralph Steingruber moved onto St. Gallen, Asif Šarić returned to Germany and joined Sportfreunde Siegen and Thomas Karrer was on loan to Grenchen. The club's priority aim was to remain in the top flight of Swiss football. Therefore, the club made a number of new signings as the season started, these included the Nigerian national team goalkeeper Ike Shorunmu, who signed in from Shooting Stars, Gabriel Okolosi, from Africa Sports National, and Alex Nyarko, from Sportul. Another promising player was Vilmar who signed in from Ferroviária. David Orlando was signed in from Sion, the young Bruno Sutter from Young Fellows Zürich and Daniele Moro signed in from Xamax.

The reform of the Nationalliga had been completed the previous season and the domestic league was contested by 12 teams. However, there was one change at the start of the 1995–96 Nationalliga A season and that was that the Swiss Football Association introduced the three points for a win standard. In 1995, FIFA formally adopted this system and it subsequently became standard in international tournaments, as well as most national football leagues. The season started well for Basel, three wins in the first four games. But then, between the sixth and sixteenth round Basel suffered eight defeats in 11 games. It was at this point that Claude Andrey lost his job as head-coach and the reasons were not just of sporting nature. Oldrich Svab took over on an interim basis on 28 October and continued until Karl Engel was appointed as new head-coach. The team caught themselves and qualified for the championship round. In the 22 games, Basel won nine, drew three and suffered ten defeats. The team had collected 30 points and they were three points above the dividing line. In the championship round Basel did not record a victory until the ninth round, but they finished the season in sixth position and thus qualified for the 1996 UEFA Intertoto Cup. In the second stage of the league season Basel managed just three victories, four draws and suffered seven defeats.

Basel entered the Swiss Cup in the third round. Here they defeated the lower-tier club Subingen 6–1. In the fourth and fifth round they defeated lower-tier clubs Gossau 3–1 and Biel-Bienne 4–1. Thus Basel advanced to the quarter-finals and here they travelled to la Maladière in Neuchâtel, but were knocked out of the cup by Xamax 2–1 after extra time. Sion won the cup. In the 1995 UEFA Intertoto Cup Basel managed a home win against Sheffield Wednesday and an away win in Poland against Górnik Zabrze. But the other two games ended with defeats, at home against the Karlsruher SC and an away game against Aarhus GF. As group winners Karlsruhe continued to the next round.

=== 104th season ===
Peter Epting retired from the chairmanship and René C. Jäggi became the club's new chairman following the AGM which was held in November. Karl Engel was trainer at the start of the season, but he was replaced by Heinz Hermann in March 1997. Hermann only remained manager for a few weeks and was replaced by Salvatore Andracchio (ad interim) until the end of the season. A number of players had left the club during the off-season, Ike Shorunmu transferred to Zürich, Mario Cantaluppi moved to Servette and Gabriel Okolosi to Young Boys. Both Davide Orlando and Alexandre Rey moved back to Sion. Further players who left the club were Marco Walker, who moved to German team 1860 Munich, Lars Olsen returned to Denmark and joined Brøndby and Andre Meier moved on to FC Schaffhausen. To balance this, the club made some new signings as the season started. Adrian Knup returned to the club, signed in after a short spell by Galatasaray. Other players who joined from foreign clubs were, Adrian Falub who came from Universitatea Cluj and Mariano Armentano from Racing Club. A number of players also transferred from the domestic league, Gaetano Giallanza and Jean-Pierre La Placa both signed in from Sion, Mario Frick came from St. Gallen and Yann Poulard signed in from SR Delémont.

The season did not start too well, it took until the twelfth round until the team recorded their third victory and one of these three was a forfeit victory because YB had used an unqualified player. As the first half of the season came to an end, the team had gathered five victories, ten draws and had suffered seven defeats. Nevertheless, the team had qualified for the championship round. During the winter break Markus Schupp signed in on loan from Hamburger SV, Franco Foda signed in from VfB Stuttgart and Fabrice Henry signed in from CD Toledo. Also during the winter break Admir Smajić transferred out to Young Boys. In the championship round the team suffered six defeats in a row. During this period head-coach Karl Engel was fired and was replaced by Heinz Hermann. The football did not improve and after just a few weeks Hermann was replaced by Salvatore Andracchio. Basel ended the championship round with nine defeats in twelve games. They had won only three games and so they ended the group in the last position in the league table.

Basel entered the Swiss Cup in the third principal round. The opponent here was lower tier FC Münsingen. Basel won the match after extra time. In the fourth round hosted the game against Young Boys and won 2–1. In the round of 16 Basel hosted Servette but they were knocked out, losing 1–4. In the 1996 UEFA Intertoto Cup Basel played in group 7 together with Rotor Volgograd, Antalyaspor, Shakhtar Donetsk and Ataka-Aura Minsk. Basel won in Turkey against Antalyaspor and at home in the St. Jakob Stadium against Minsk. They drew at home with Shakhtar, but lost in Russia against Volgograd, who ended at the top of the group and continued to the next round. Basel ended the competition as second-placed team in the group league table.

=== 105th season ===
René C. Jäggi was the club's chairman following the AGM the year before and was confirmed in this position for this season. The club's priority aim was to remain in the top flight of Swiss football.Jörg Berger was appointed as the new trainer at the start of the season, but in October 1997 he was sacked and was replaced by Salvatore Andracchio (ad interim) until Guy Mathez was appointed as trainer from 1 January 1998. The club made many new signings as the season started. Amongst these, there were many experienced players, such as Oliver Kreuzer from Bayern Munich, Marco Sas from Bradford City, Maurizio Gaudino from Eintracht Frankfurt, Jürgen Hartmann from Hamburger SV and Nestor Subiat from Grasshopper Club. There were also young players such as Marco Pérez from Vaduz, Jan Berger from Grasshopper Club and Fabinho Santos from Joinville (Brazil) as well as Luís Calapes and Alexander Frei from the club's own youth section.

Goalkeeper Thomas Grüter retired from professional football. Many other players also left the club, under them Mariano Armentano who transferred to Vélez Sarsfield, Adrian Falub who returned to Universitatea Cluj and Alex Nyarko who transferred to Karlsruher SC. The loan contracts with Franco Foda and Markus Schupp came to an end and because Basel did not opt to buy them, they both moved on to Sturm Graz. The youngsters Bruno Sutter transferred to Zürich and Hakan Yakin transferred to Grasshopper Club. At the end of the transfer window teo further players left the squad, last season's top scorer Gaetano Giallanza transferred to Nantes in September and Jean-Pierre La Placa signed for Toulouse.

The football league season did not start the way that head-coach Berger had hoped. Four of the first six games ended in a defeat, the team conceding 12 goals and scoring just three. Berger was put under pressure by the club's board of directors, but things did not improve. After six consecutive defeats Berger was sacked. He was replaced ad interim by trainer Salvatore Andracchio, who had helped out the previous season. The team managed to improve their results, but could not correct the slip into the Relegation Group. During the winter break Guy Mathez was appointed as new head-coach. Soon after this the newly signed Nemtsoudis left the club and Nestor Subiat's loan contract was ended and the contract with Marco Sas was dissolved. Under new trainer Mathez, the first few games were good. But after a period with three away defeats and two home draws, it seemed that the team were heading for relegation. A dramatic finish with three straight victories over the three better placed teams Young Boys, SC Kriens and finally Solothurn saved Basel from the relegation drop.

Basel entered the Swiss Cup with a bye in the third and fourth principal round and started in the fifth. The opponents here were lower tier SC Buochs. Despite an early lead, Basel were down 1–2 just after the break and it stayed that way right up until the 86th minute. Then Nestor Subiat poked the ball into the goal out of the crowd of players who had gathered in the six yard box, it was the equalizer. In the extra period Basel had no further problems and the Buochs players had no more stamina. Two more Subiat goals, two from Adrian Knup and the final goal from Fabrice Henry was followed by the final whistle. Basel won 7–2 after extra time. In the round of 16 Basel's opponents were Xamax, who were stronger and they won by two goals to nil. The cup final was played between Lausanne-Sport and St. Gallen, this ended with a draw after extra time. Lausanne won the penalty shoot out, thus winning the trophy.

=== 106th, stadium construction ===
René C. Jäggi was the club's chairman for the third year. Guy Mathez, who had assumed coaching duties in January, was appointed head coach at the start of the season. He was sacked on 14 May 1999 and replaced on an interim basis by Marco Schällibaum for the remainder of the season. The club made many new signings as the season started, these included Mario Cantaluppi who returned from Servette. Also from Servette came the Romanian international Dan Potocianu and, on loan, the youngster Carlos Varela. Aleksandr Rytchkov was signed from 1. FC Köln and Philippe Cravero signed in from lower classed Etoile Carouge. The Ivorian international Ahmed Ouattara and the young Brazilian Abedi were signed in from Sion. Benjamin Huggel was signed in from local amateur club FC Münchenstein, he had played the previous season for FC Arlesheim, in the fourth tier of Swiss football. In the other direction Adrian Knup, Daniel Salvi and Jürgen Hartmann all ended their football careers. Dario Zuffi returned to his club of origin Winterthur after having playing five years for the club. Jan Berger moved to Aarau and youngster Alexander Frei was loaned out to Thun. Fabinho Santos returned home to Joinville in Brasil.

The first half of the season, until 13 December 1998, Basel's home ground was the St. Jakob Stadium. From 7 March 1999, Basel played home matches at the Stadion Schützenmatte and this because the old stadium was demolished and the new stadium was to be built on the same plot of land. The construction of the new stadium was to take a little more than two years. The new stadium, the St. Jakob-Park, was to be an all seater, the old stadium had standing places on three sides. The club's priority aim was to remain in the top flight of Swiss football. The season started fairly well, with five victories and three draws in the first ten rounds. However, seven defeats in the next nine rounds let the team slip down into the bottom areas of the table. Basel ended the qualification stage with eight victories, four draws and ten defeats, with 28 points in sixth position in the league table. With this tally they were qualified for Champions Group for the second half of the season. With an average second half of the season, winning five games, drawing four and losing five, Basel finished in the league tables in fifth position.

All eyes were set on the cup season. But despite a draw against lower classed Stade Nyonnais, Basel's cup season came to an abrupt end, because they were unable to pass this hurdle, losing the match on penalties. Lausanne-Sport won the Swiss Cup final on 13 June 199 in the Wankdorf Stadium, winning 2–0 against Grasshopper Club.

=== 107th season ===
René C. Jäggi was the club's chairman for the fourth year. On 15 June 1999 Christian Gross was appointed as the new first team trainer and he assigned Ruedi Zbinden as his co-trainer. Forming his new team, Gross made a number of signings before the season started. These new signings included defensive players such as Alexandre Quennoz, who signed from Sion, Ivan Knez from Luzern and Murat Yakin who came from Fenerbahçe and forwards such as George Koumantarakis who signed in from Luzern, Didier Tholot from Sion and Thomas Häberli from Kriens. The most interest was raised in the signing of Pascal Zuberbühler in a goalkeeper swap with Stefan Huber who then went to Grasshopper Club. In the outwards direction Mario Frick transferred to Zürich, Abedi to Yverdon and Fabrice Henry to Hibernian (on loan). Before the domestic League season started on 7 July Basel had little time to get things ready. They organised one test game against lower tier SR Delémont, which was played in Laufen and won 2–0, and they entered the Sempione Cup, which was played in Balsthal. Here Basel played the semi-final against Brazilian team Ituano FC, which was lost, and the third place match against Croatian Dinamo Zagreb, in which they also suffered a defeat.

The qualifying round of the 1999–2000 Nationalliga A season was contested by twelve teams. The first eight teams of the First Stage (or Qualification) were then to compete in the Championship Round. The season started on 7 July. Basel's priority aim was to reach the Championship stage and end the season in the top three. The season started sub-optimal, the team remained unbeaten, but with just three wins and four draws in the first seven rounds, they lost contact to the table leaders. Following their first defeat, in the away game against Lausanne-Sport, Basel improved their position in the table with another three victories. Basel suffered their first home defeat on 2 October against Yverdon-Sports, but they ended the Qualification Round in second position in the league table. The Championship Round started on 12 March 2000. The participating teams took half of the points (rounded up to complete units) gained in the Qualification as bonus with them. Basel played amongst the table leaders and in the tenth round they even managed a 3–1 victory against league leaders St. Gallen. However, in their last four matches Basel won only two further points and dropped to third position behind champions St Gallen and Lausanne, against whom the final game of the season ended in a 0–3 home defeat on 7 June 2000. Nevertheless, Basel qualified for the 2000–01 UEFA Cup.

Basel's clear aim for the Swiss Cup was to win the title. In the round of 32, they were drawn away against Mendrisio. In the next round a home game against Grasshopper Club, ended in a draw and was eventually won in the penalty shoot out. The quarterfinal against Lausanne-Sport ended the cup run. Lausanne continued and advanced to the final, but here they were beaten by Zürich in a penalty shoot-out.

Basel were qualified for the 1999 UEFA Intertoto Cup. The first round was played against Slovenian team Korotan Prevalje on 20 and 26 June 1999 and won 6–0 on aggregate. The second round draw brought the Czech Republic club Boby Brno to Basel on 4 July. The return leg a week later gave Basel a 4–2 victory on aggregate. Although the first leg of the third round was won away from home against Hamburg, the Germans won the second leg in the Stadion Schützenmatte and Hamburg proceeded due to the away goals rule.

== See also ==
- FC Basel
- List of FC Basel players
- List of FC Basel seasons
- Football in Switzerland

== Sources ==
- Die ersten 125 Jahre / 2018. Publisher: Josef Zindel im Friedrich Reinhardt Verlag, Basel. ISBN 978-3-7245-2305-5
- FC Basel Archiv / Verein "Basler Fussballarchiv"
