= 1984–85 FC Basel season =

FC Basel
1984–85 season
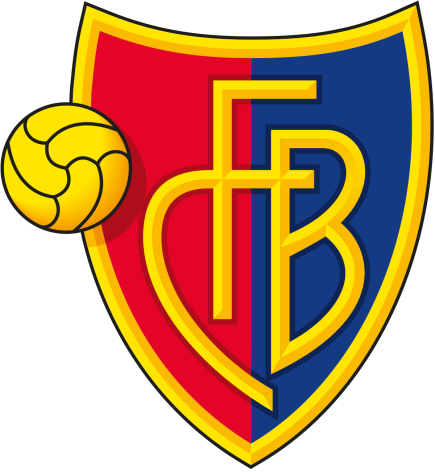
- Chairman: Urs Gribi
- Manager: Ernst August Künnecke until November 1984; Emil Müller from then onwards
- Ground: St. Jakob Stadium, Basel
- Nationalliga A: 8th of 16
- Swiss Cup: Round 5
- Top goalscorer: League: Peter Nadig (11); All: Peter Nadig and Beat Sutter (both 13)
- Highest home attendance: 6,000 on 9 March 1985 vs FC Aarau
- Lowest home attendance: 1,500 on 8 June 1985 vs FC Winterthur
- Average home league attendance: 3,773

The Fussball Club Basel 1893 1984–85 season was their 91st season since their foundation. It was their 39th consecutive season in the top flight of Swiss football since their promotion in the 1945–46 season. FC Basel played their home games in the St. Jakob Stadium. For the second year running the club's chairman was Urs Gribi.

== Overview ==
=== Pre-season ===
It was Ernst August Künnecke's second year as first team manager with Emil Müller as his assistant. Künnecke made amendments to the team, Walter Geisser retired and Jean-Pierre Maradan, Jörg Stohler as well as Arthur von Wartburg who had been thrown out of the squad the previous season all moved on to Grenchen. Künnecke persuaded Adrie van Kraay to join the team from Waterschei Thor. The youngsters Beat Feigenwinter (from Nordstern Basel), Livio Bordoli (from Hessen Kassel) and Ertan Irizik (from Concordia Basel) were transferred in. Basel's own youngsters Peter Nadig, Beat Sutter, Thomas Hauser, Fredy Grossenbacher and Dominique Herr were formed into team leaders.

In this season Basel played a total of 63 games. 30 matches were played in the domestic league, three in the Swiss Cup and 30 were friendly matches. Of their 30 test games, 24 ended with a victory, two were drawn, four ended with a defeat, the team scored 120 goals and conceded 37. Only three of these test games were played at home in St. Jakob Stadium, the others were all played away.

=== Domestic league ===
The 1984–85 Nationalliga A was contested by 16 teams, including the top 14 clubs from the previous season and the two sides promoted from the second level, Nationalliga B, the previous season, these being SC Zug and Winterthur. The league was contested in a double round robin format, with each club playing every other club twice, home and away. Two points were awarded for a win and one point given to each team for a draw.

The good results in pre-season test matches, including a draw against Borussia Dortmund and victories against Karlsruher SC, SC Freiburg and Bayern Munich could not be taken over in to the domestic league games. Basel lost three of their first four matches,(the SC Zug match was declared forfeit at a later date). Then, following a run of five defeats and five draws with only one win, the team suffered one defeat too many against Lausanne-Sport on the 11 November. Basel's club chairman Urs Gribi fired head-coach Künnecke and installed Müller as new head coach until the end of the season and Müller was able to lead the team away from the relegation zone. Basel ended the season in eighth position, 15 points behind Servette Genève who became Swiss champions that year. In their 30 league matches Basel won eleven, drew nine and lost ten games. At the end of the championship season Basel had obtained 31 points, had scored 46 and had conceded 49 goals. Peter Nadig was the team's top league goal scorer with eleven goals and Beat Sutter second highest scorer with ten.

=== Swiss Cup ===
Basel entered the Swiss Cup in the round of 64 with an away game against lower classed FC Dürrenast. This was won 4–0. In the second round they had a home match, also against a lower classed team FC Langenthal. This match resulted in a 6–0 victory. However, with the third round home game against Servette Basels cup season came to an end because they lost the match 0–1. Aarau won the cup, beating Xamax 1–0 in the final.

== Players ==
Note: Flags indicate national team as defined under FIFA eligibility rules; some limited exceptions apply. Players may hold more than one non-FIFA nationality.

No.	Pos.	Nation	Player
1	GK	SUI	Dominik Leder (from Concordia Basel)
1	GK	SUI	Thomas Paul
1	GK	SUI	Urs Suter
2	DF	SUI	Rolf Lauper
3	DF	SUI	Beat Feigenwinter (from Nordstern Basel)
4	DF	GER	Thomas Süss
5	DF	NED	Adrie van Kraay (from Waterschei Thor)
6	DF	SUI	Martin Andermatt
7	MF	SUI	Martin Jeitziner
8	FW	SUI	Beat Sutter
9	MF	GER	Thomas Hauser

No.	Pos.	Nation	Player
10	MF	SUI	Erni Maissen
11	FW	SUI	Ruedi Zbinden
12	DF	SUI	Livio Bordoli (from Hessen Kassel)
13	DF	SUI	Alfred Lüthi
14	DF	SUI	Ertan Irizik (from Concordia Basel)
15	MF	SUI	Peter Nadig
16	DF	SUI	Fredy Grossenbacher
17	MF	SUI	René Botteron
18	MF	SUI	Guido Rudin
19	MF	SUI	Nicolas Keller
20	DF	SUI	Felix Rudin
21	DF	SUI	Dominique Herr

Players who left the squad

Note: Flags indicate national team as defined under FIFA eligibility rules; some limited exceptions apply. Players may hold more than one non-FIFA nationality.

No.	Pos.	Nation	Player
—	DF	SUI	Walter Geisser (retired)
—	DF	SUI	Stefano Ceccaroni (on loan to Baden)
—	DF	SUI	Jean-Pierre Maradan (to Grenchen)

No.	Pos.	Nation	Player
—	MF	SUI	Arthur von Wartburg (to Grenchen)
—	DF	SUI	Jörg Stohler (to Grenchen)
—	FW	GER	Uwe Dreher (to FC Laufen)

== Results ==
Legend

Win Draw Loss Postponed

=== Friendly matches ===
==== Pre- and mid-season ====
29 June 1984 Pre-season	SV Sissach (Switzerland)	2–7	(Switzerland) Basel	Tannenbrunn, Sissach
20:00	Del Duca 9' (1:0); René Bogni 67' (2:4)	FCB summary	18' (1:1) Andermatt; 22' (pen. 1:2) Andermatt; 50' (1:3) Hauser; 65' (1:4) Hauser; 68' (2:5) Nadig; 76' (2:6) Maissen; 88' (2:7) Hauser	Attendance: 850; Referee: (Switzerland) André Reck
Note: Anniversary match 75 years SV Sissach

7 July 1984 Pre-season	SC Zug (Switzerland)	0–5	(Switzerland) Basel	Herti Allmend Stadion, Zug
17:00		FCB summary	16' (0:1) Maissen; 33' (0:2) Nadig; 66' (0:4) Nadig; 61' (0:4) Maissen; 66' (0:5) Nadig	Attendance: 750; Referee: (Switzerland) Robert Süess (Luzern and Meggen)

10 July 1984 Pre-season	SV Gruol (Germany)	1–5	(Switzerland) Basel	Freihof, Haigerloch
	van Kraay 23' (o.g. 1:3)	FCB summary	10' (0:1) Maissen; 15' (0:2) Hauser; 19' (0:3) Maissen; 75' (1:4) Grossenbacher; 78' (pen. 1:5) Jeitziner	Attendance: 600; Referee: (Germany) Stehle

11 July 1984 Pre-season	FC Viktoria Neckarhausen (Germany)	3–6	(Switzerland) Basel	Sportgelände an der Porschestrasse, Neckarhausen
18:30	(1x) (1x) (1x)	FCB summary	(3x) Nadig (2x) Maissen (1x) Jeitziner	Attendance: 500

12 July 1984 Pre-season	FC Epfendorf 1929 (Germany)	1–8	(Switzerland) Basel	Sportplatz Epfendorf, Epfendorf
18:30	Stamm (1x)	FCB summary	(2x) Maissen (2x) Jeitziner (1x) van Kraay (1x) Nadig (1x) Hauser (1x) Bordoli	Attendance: 700

14 July 1984 Pre-season	FC Klengen (Germany)	0–8	(Switzerland) Basel	Höhenstadion, Klengen
		FCB summary	(3x) Jeitziner (1x) Maissen (1x) Lauper (1x) Hauser (1x) Nadig (1x) Irizik	Attendance: 500

19 July 1984 Pre-season	Basel (Switzerland)	3–1	(Germany) Karlsruher SC	St. Jakob Stadium, Basel
20:00	Hauser 11' (1:0); Hauser 12' (2:0); Bordoli 50' (3:1)	FCB summary	18' (2:1) Dittus	Attendance: 2,900; Referee: (Switzerland) Rolf Blattmann

21 July 1984 Pre-season	FC Dürrenast (Switzerland)	2–6	(Switzerland) Basel	Sportplatz Strandbad, Thun
17:00	Baumann 5' (1:0); Baumann 86' (2:0)	FCB summary	8' (1:1) Maissen; 36' (1:2) Maissen; 37' (1:3) Hauser; 40' (1:4) Irizik; 46' (1:5) Hauser; 53' (1:6) Maissen	Attendance: 700; Referee: (Switzerland) Francis Fischer (Arch)

23 July 1984 Uhrencup semi-final	Grenchen (Switzerland)	2–2 (a.e.t.) (5–6 p)	(Switzerland) Basel	Stadion Brühl, Grenchen
20:30	von Wartburg (yellow card) 37' von Wartburg 54' (1:2); Reich 64' (2:2)	FCB summary	33' (0:1) Maissen; 53' (0:2) Maissen; Süss (yellow card) 63'	Attendance: 2,500; Referee: (Switzerland) Francis Fischer (Arch)
	Penalties
	von Wartburg (penalty scored); Stohler (penalty scored); Röthlisberger (penalty scored); Maradan (penalty scored); Bauer (penalty scored) de Almeida (penalty missed)		(penalty scored) Hauser; (penalty scored) Jeitziner; (penalty scored) Lauper; (penalty scored) Maissen; (penalty scored) van Kraay; (penalty scored) Zbinden
Note: The Uhrencup is a former club football tournament that was held annually in Grenchen in Switzerland

27 July 1984 Uhrencup Final	Basel (Switzerland)	2–4	(Switzerland) Servette	Stadion Brühl, Grenchen
20:30	Sutter 23' (1:0); Dutoit 47' (o.g. 2:2); Rudin (yellow card)	FCB summary	28' (1:1) Brigger; 46' (1:2) Barberis; 73' (2:3) Brigger; 77' (2:4) Barberis; (yellow card) Renquin	Attendance: 3,500; Referee: (Switzerland) Jean-Marie Macheret, (Rueyres-St-Laurent)

28 July 1984 Pre-season	Basel (Switzerland)	2–2	(Germany) Borussia Dortmund	St. Jakob Stadium, Basel
18:00	Bordoli 35' (1:1); Bordoli 69' (2:2)	FCB summary	17' (0:1) Pagelsdorf; 67' (1:2) Pagelsdorf; (yellow card) 68' Egli	Attendance: 2,300; Referee: (Switzerland) Bruno Galler (Kirchdorf, Bern)

31 July 1984 Pre-season	FC Mulhouse (France)	3–2	(Switzerland) Basel	Stade Municipal, Huningue
20:00	Eriksen 7' (pen. 1:0); Eriksen 30' (2:0); Grunellon 52' (3:1)	FCB summary	44' (2:1) Hauser; 65' (3:2) Jeitziner	Attendance: 700; Referee: (France) Seltz

2 August 1984 Pre-season	Baden (Switzerland)	1–2	(Switzerland) Basel	Mittlerzelg, Spreitenbach
20:00	Ceccaroni 60' (1:2)	FCB summary	34' (0:1) Sutter; 53' (0:2) Irizik; (penalty missed) 70′ Jeitziner	Attendance: 500; Referee: (Switzerland) René Gemperle

5 August 1984 Pre-season	Basel (Switzerland)	2–0	(Germany) SC Freiburg	Wolfstiege, Gelterkinden
16:15	Maissen 43' (1:0); Zbinden 68' (2:0); Süss (yellow card); Lauper (yellow card)	FCB summary	(yellow card) Kruppa; (yellow card) Hermann	Attendance: 1,100; Referee: (Switzerland) Rolf Blattmann (Zeiningen)

7 August 1984 Pre-season	FC Laufen (Switzerland)	2–1	(Switzerland) Basel	Sportplatz Nau, Laufen
20:00	Leuthardt 19' (1:0); Stadelmann 75' (2:0)	FCB summary	81' (2:1) Sutter	Attendance: 950; Referee: (Switzerland) Peter Bochsler (Basel)

11 August 1984 Pre-season	Basel (Switzerland)	3–2	(Germany) Bayern Munich	St. Jakob Stadium, Basel
19:30	Maissen 47' (1:1); Andermatt 64' (2:2); Lauper 69' (3:2)	FCB summary	10' (0:1) Rummenigge; 62' (1:2) Nachtweih	Attendance: 7,000; Referee: (Switzerland) Jakob Baumann (Schaffhausen)

11 September 1984 Mid-season	SC Ciba-Geigy Klybeck (Switzerland)	0–9	(Switzerland) Basel	Basel
19:00		FCB summary	(4x) Jeitziner (2x) Maissen (2x); Hauser (1x) Zbinden	Referee: (Switzerland) Peter Bochsler (Basel)

23 October 1984 Mid-season	FC Liestal (Switzerland)	0–9	(Switzerland) Basel	Gitterli, Liestal
19:00		FCB summary	13' (0:1) Sutter; 39' (0:2) Hauser; 52' (0:3) Grossenbacher; 57' (0:4) Hauser; 61' (0:5) Zbinden; 74' (0:6) Hauser; 76' (0:7) Andermatt; 80' (0:8) Süss; 82' (0:9) Botteron	Attendance: 215; Referee: (Switzerland) Peter Bochsler (Basel)

30 October 1984 Mid-season	Old Boys (Switzerland)	0–4	(Switzerland) Basel	Stadion Schützenmatte, Basel
20:00		FCB summary	23' (0:1) Jeitziner; 24' (0:2) Zbinden; 30' (0:3) Nadig; 85' (0:4) Bordoli	Attendance: 200; Referee: (Switzerland) Weisskopf

2 November 1984 Mid-season	Schaffhausen (Switzerland)	1–2	(Switzerland) Basel	Stadion Breite, Schaffhausen
19:00	Graf 63' (1:1)	FCB summary	59' (0:1) Hauser; 81' (1:2) Hauser	Attendance: 665; Referee: (Switzerland) Roland Gnägi

4 November 1984 Mid-season	Baden (Switzerland)	2–2	(Switzerland) Basel	Laufenburg
14:30	Ceccaroni 13' (1:0); Allegretti 54' (2:2)	FCB summary	13' (1:1) Botteron; 19' (1:2) Nadig	Attendance: 1,000; Referee: (Switzerland) Peter Bochsler (Basel)

==== Winter break and mid-season ====
30 January 1985 Winter break	1. FC Herzogenaurach (Germany)	0–1	(Switzerland) Basel	Lanzarote
		FCB summary	(0:1) G. Rudin

1 February 1985 Winter break	1. FC Herzogenaurach (Germany)	0–4	(Switzerland) Basel	Lanzarote
		FCB summary	(2x) Hauser (1x) Zbinden (1x) Lauper

5 February 1985 Winter break	FC Köniz (Switzerland)	0–4	(Switzerland) Basel	Lanzarote
		FCB summary	Goal
Note: The game took place during the second week of training camp in Lanzarote, between February 3rd and 10th, 1985; the exact date is unknown!

6 February 1985 Winter break	FC Köniz (Switzerland)	0–2	(Switzerland) Basel	Lanzarote
		FCB summary	Goal
Note: The game took place during the second week of training camp in Lanzarote, between February 3rd and 10th, 1985; the exact date is unknown!

16 February 1985 Winter break	Basel (Switzerland)	2–1	(Switzerland) SC Zug	Sportanlagen St. Jakob, Basel
14:30	Sutter 4' (1:0); Sutter 28' (2:0)	FCB summary	61' (2:1) Killmaier; (penalty missed) 81′ Killmaier	Attendance: 150; Referee: (Switzerland) Peter Bochsler (Basel)
Note: 81st minute, Thomas Paul saved the penalty taken by Werner Killmaier.

20 February 1985 Winter break	Basel (Switzerland)	3–0	(Switzerland) Old Boys	Landhof, Basel
17:30	Botteron (1x); Sutter (1x); Lauper (1x)	FCB summary

23 February 1985 Winter break	Bellinzona (Switzerland)	0–2	(Switzerland) Basel	Campo Roviscaglie, Gordola
14:30		FCB summary	40' (0:1) Nadig; 64' (0:2) Sutter	Attendance: 200; Referee: (Switzerland) Renzo Peduzzi (Roveredo)

16 April 1985 Mid-season	Kriens (Switzerland)	2–8	(Switzerland) Basel	Stadion Kleinfeld, Kriens
	W. Müller (1x); Bauhofer (1x)	FCB summary	47' Hauser; 50' Hauser; 57' Hauser (2x) Maissen (1x) Jeitziner (1x) Lüthi (1x pen.) Botteron	Attendance: 150
Note: Thomas Hauser scored a classic hat trick between the 47th and 57th minutes.

30 April 1985 Mid-season	Aarau (Switzerland)	5–4	(Switzerland) Basel	Stadion Brügglifeld, Aarau
	Marti 5' (1:0); Seiler 12' (2:0); Kaltaveridis 30' (3:2); Schär 43' (4:2); Fregno 74' (5:3)	FCB summary	15' Andermatt; 28' (2:2) Zbinden; 69' (4:3) Maissen; 87' (5:4) Andermatt	Attendance: 350; Referee: (Switzerland) Manfred Schlup, (Grenchen)

=== Nationalliga A ===
==== League matches ====
15 August 1984 Round 1	Grasshopper Club	3–0	Basel	Hardturm, Zürich
20:00	Hermann 5' (1:0); Wehrli 9' (2:0); Schällibaum (yellow card) 31'; Ponte 52' (3:0)	FCB summary	(yellow card) 54' Jeitziner	Attendance: 5,500; Referee: (Switzerland) Werner Liebi (Thun)
Note: Swiss national team head-coach Paul Wolfisberg and Andy Egli were among the spectators.

18 August 1984 Round 2	Basel	3–0 FF	SC Zug	St. Jakob Stadium, Basel
20:00	Zbinden (yellow card) 63' (yellow-red card) 64'	FCB summary	19' (pen. 0:1) Killmaier; 29' (0:2) Markus SchärerSchärer; (yellow card) 50' Dünner; (yellow card) 64' Batardon	Attendance: 4,000; Referee: (Switzerland) Bruno Galler (Kirchdorf, Bern)
Note: Corners: 6:3. Forfeit win for Basel because Killmaier was not eligible to play

25 August 1984 Round 3	Winterthur	1–2	Basel	Schützenwiese, Winterthur
19:30	Arrigoni 87' (1:2)	FCB summary	56' (0:1) Maissen; 82' (0:2) Maissen	Attendance: 3,300; Referee: (Switzerland) Gottlieb Barmettler (Luzern)

28 August 1984 Round 4	Basel	1–5	St. Gallen	St. Jakob Stadium, Basel
20:00	Maissen 67' (1:3); Süss (yellow card) 68'	FCB summary	8' (0:1) Braschler; 26' (0:2) Signer; 33' (0:3) Zwicker; (yellow card) 72' Germann; 77' (1:4) Friberg; 88' (1:5) Braschler	Attendance: 5,500; Referee: (Switzerland) André Daina (Éclépens)

5 September 1984 Round 5	Vevey-Sports	3–3	Basel	Stade de Copet, Vevey
20:00	Siwek 18' (1:2); Siwek (yellow card) 27'; Débonnaire (yellow card) 65'; Débonnaire 69' (2:3); Chapuisat 78' (3:3)	FCB summary	2' (0:1) Nadig; 13' (0:2) Jeitziner; 42' (1:3) Nadig; (yellow card) 54' Feigenwinter; (yellow card) 90' Hauser	Attendance: 1,500; Referee: (Switzerland) Robert Süess (Luzern and Meggen)
Note: FCB captain Erni Maissen protested on the pitch because there were two balls on the field at the moment Yves Débonnaire scored to make it 2:3.

22 September 1984 Round 6	Basel	0–0	Wettingen	St. Jakob Stadium, Basel
20:00	van Kraay (yellow card) 17'	FCB summary	(yellow card) 26' Hüsser; (yellow card) 38' Peterhans	Attendance: 3,000; Referee: (Switzerland) Charles-Henri Morex (Bex)
Note: Before the match Erni Maissen was honored for his 200th NLA game with FC Basel.

27 September 1984 Round 7	Xamax	0–0	Basel	Stade de la Maladière (1924), Neuchâtel
20:00	Mata (yellow card) 65'	FCB summary	(yellow card) 22' Zbinden; (yellow card) 36' Maissen	Attendance: 4,600; Referee: (Germany) Hans Wahmann
Note: Swiss national team head-coach Paul Wolfisberg among the spectators.

6 October 1984 Round 8	Basel	1–1	Zürich	St. Jakob Stadium, Basel
17:30	Sutter 60' (1:0); Jeitziner (yellow card) 83'	FCZ summary FCB summary	(yellow card) 11' Stoll; 90' (1:1) Alliata; (yellow card) 90' Rufer	Attendance: 4,500; Referee: (Switzerland) Francesco Bianchi (Chiasso)
Note: Corners: 12:5

10 October 1984 Round 9	Sion	1–1	Basel	Stade Tourbillon, Sion
20:15	Sarrasin 1' (1:0); Balet (yellow card) 31'; Valentini (yellow card) 89'	FCB summary	(yellow card) 10' Sutter; (yellow card) 57' Botteron; 82' (1:1) Nadig	Attendance: 4,500; Referee: (Switzerland) Robert Süess (Luzern and Meggen)

27 October 1984 Round 10	Basel	0–3	Servette	St. Jakob Stadium, Basel
20:00		FCB summary	(yellow card) 45' Schnyder; 66' (0:1) Kok; (yellow card) 72' Kok; (yellow card) 79' Brigger; 85' (0:2) Barberis; 90+1' (0:3) Brigger	Attendance: 5,500; Referee: (Switzerland) Kurt Röthlisberger (Suhr, Aargau)

11 November 1984 Round 11	Lausanne-Sport	1–0	Basel	Olympique de la Pontaise, Lausanne
14:30	Sunesson 33' (1:0)	FCB summary	(yellow card) 67' Süss	Attendance: 4,800; Referee: (Switzerland) Werner Liebi (Thun)
Note: Corners: 5:5

17 November 1984 Round 12	Basel	4–1	Luzern	St. Jakob Stadium, Basel
15:30	Jeitziner 22' (1:0); Grossenbacher 27' (2:0); Andermatt 48' (pen. 3:0); Andermatt 84' (4:1)	FCB summary	83' (3:1) Bernaschina	Attendance: 3,000; Referee: (Switzerland) Jakob Schönenberger
Note: A very fair match with a good refereeing performance; no cautions. Corners: 8:1.

25 November 1984 Round 13	Basel	4–1	La Chaux-de-Fonds	St. Jakob Stadium, Basel
14:30	Lüthi 10' (1:0); Hauser (yellow card) 24'; Sutter 52' (2:0); Sutter 70' (3:1); Sutter 74' (4:1)	FCB summary	(yellow card) 51' Meyer; 63' (2:1) Hohl; (yellow card) 67' Nogues; (yellow card) 78' Schleiffer	Attendance: 4,500; Referee: (Switzerland) Francesco Bianchi (Chiasso)

2 December 1984 Round 14	Aarau	1–0	Basel	Stadion Brügglifeld, Aarau
14:30	Schär 28' (1:0); Küng (yellow card) 64'	FCB summary FCA summary	(yellow card) 30' (yellow-red card) 71' Zbinden	Attendance: 7,800; Referee: (Switzerland) Gottlieb Barmettler (Luzern)

9 December 1984 Round 15	Basel	1–0	Young Boys	St. Jakob Stadium, Basel
14:30	Süss (yellow card) 13'; Hauser 33' (1:0); Lauper (yellow card) 36'	FCB summary	(yellow card) 2' Bamert; (yellow card) 40' Bregy; (yellow card) 58' Weber	Attendance: 5,000; Referee: (Switzerland) Robert Süess (Luzern and Meggen)
Note: Floodlights permanently on and drizzle throughout the entire game.

3 March 1985 Round 16	Young Boys	0–0	Basel	Wankdorf Stadium, Bern
14:30		FCB summary	(yellow card) 72' Lüthi	Attendance: 6,500; Referee: (Switzerland) Jakob Baumann (Schaffhausen)
Note: Corners: 10:2

9 March 1985 Round 17	Basel	0–1	Aarau	St. Jakob Stadium, Basel
16:00	Lüthi (yellow card) 14'; Suter (yellow card) 72'	FCB summary FCA summary	73' (0:1) Herberth; (yellow card) 74' Schär	Attendance: 6,000; Referee: (Switzerland) Renzo Peduzzi (Roveredo)

23 March 1985 Round 18	La Chaux-de-Fonds	1–1	Basel	Stade Charrière, La Chaux-de-Fonds
17:30	Nogues 71' (1:1); Gianfreda (yellow card)	FCB summary	20' (0:1) Sutter; (penalty missed) 90′ Andermatt	Attendance: 1,500; Referee: (Switzerland) Gottlieb Barmettler (Luzern)
Note: 90th minute, Andermatt miss-kicks the penalty-shot, after a foul on Fredy Grossenbacher. Corners: 3-6.

31 March 1985 Round 19	Luzern	1–1	Basel	Stadion Allmend, Luzern
14:30	Baumann (yellow card) 24'; Hegi 77' (pen. 1:1)	FCB summary	(yellow card) 17' Suter; (yellow card) 22' Süss; 54' (0:1) Jeitziner; (yellow card) 85' Jeitziner	Attendance: 6,400; Referee: (Switzerland) André Daina (Éclépens)
Note: Corners: 6:4.

11 April 1985 Round 20	Basel	6–2	Lausanne-Sport	St. Jakob Stadium, Basel
20:00	Nadig 4' (1:0); Nadig 18' (2:0); Maissen 63' (3:1); Zbinden 69' (4:1); Nadig 78' (5:1); Andermatt 87' (6:2)	FCB summary	27' (2:1) Pellegrini; 82' (5:2) Thychosen	Attendance: 3,000; Referee: (Switzerland) Francesco Bianchi (Chiasso)

20 April 1985 Round 21	Servette	4–0	Basel	Charmilles Stadium, Geneva
20:30	Brigger 32' (1:0); Decastel 49' (2:0); Castella 85' (3:0); Schnyder 88' (4:0)	FCB summary	(yellow card) 83' Hauser	Attendance: 6,000; Referee: (Switzerland) Werner Liebi (Thun)
Note: Corners: 4:6

26 April 1985 Round 22	Basel	1–1	Sion	St. Jakob Stadium, Basel
20:00	Nadig 50' (1:0)	FCB summary	54' (1:1) Cina	Attendance: 2,500; Referee: (Switzerland) Charles-Henri Morex (Bex)
Note: Martin Jeitziner and Beat Sutter both honored for their 100th game in the Nationalliga A.

23 May 1985 Round 23	Zürich	3–2	Basel	Letzigrund, Zürich
20:00	Landolt 10' (1:1); Alliata 24' (2:1); Baur (yellow card) 25'; Alliata 58' (3:1)	FCZ summary FCB summary	4' (0:1) Nadig; (yellow card) 55' Grossenbacher; 73' (3:2) Nadig	Attendance: 3,000; Referee: (Switzerland) Robert Süess (Luzern and Meggen)
Note: Former FCB head-coach Helmut Benthaus in the stands, among the spectators. Corners 6:3.

11 May 1985 Round 24	Basel	1–3	Xamax	St. Jakob Stadium, Basel
20:00	Sutter 90' (1:3)	FCB summary	28' (0:1) Lüthi; 59' (0:2) Thévénaz; 77' (0:3) Lüthi	Attendance: 3,600; Referee: (Switzerland) André Daina (Éclépens)
Note: No yellow cards in a very fair game. Corners: 10:10.

18 May 1985 Round 25	Wettingen	2–3	Basel	Stadion Altenburg, Wettingen
20:00	Michelberger (penalty missed) 38′ Zanchi 55' (1:1); Brügger (yellow card) 68'; Michelberger 90' (2:3)	FCB summary	7' (0:1) Sutter; 68' (1:2) Sutter; 77' (1:3) Sutter	Attendance: 2,100; Referee: (Switzerland) Philippe Mercier (Pully)
Note: 38th minute: FCB goalkeeper Urs Suter saved the penalty-kick from Franz Michelberger

24 May 1985 Round 26	Basel	2–1	Vevey-Sports	St. Jakob Stadium, Basel
20:00	Nadig 30' (1:0); Andermatt 65' (2:1)	FCB summary	45' (1:1) Siwek	Attendance: 2,500; Referee: (Switzerland) Bruno Galler (Kirchdorf, Bern)

5 June 1985 Round 27	St. Gallen	4–0	Basel	Espenmoos, St. Gallen
20:00	Zwicker 3' (1:0); Zwicker 7' (2:0); Gisinger 12' (3:0); Signer 30' (4:0)	FCB summary		Attendance: 7,200; Referee: (Switzerland) Jean-Claude Tagliabue

8 June 1985 Round 28	Basel	3–2	Winterthur	St. Jakob Stadium, Basel
20:00	Nadig 50' (1:2); Hauser (yellow card) 54'; Maissen 58' (2:2); Andermatt (yellow card) 59'; Hauser 77' (3:2)	FCB summary	36' (0:1) Egli; 39' (0:2) Franz; (yellow card) 65' Franz	Attendance: 1,500; Referee: (Switzerland) Freddy Philippoz (Sion)

15 June 1985 Round 29	SC Zug	3–4	Basel	Herti Allmend Stadion, Zug
20:00	Dünner 11' (1:1); Marin 17' (2:1); Gilli 24' (3:1); Käser (yellow card) 82'	FCB summary	7' (0:1) Jeitziner; 36' (3:2) Sutter; 45' (3:3) Zbinden; 52' (3:4) Zbinden; (yellow card) 77' Irizik	Attendance: 600; Referee: (Switzerland) Charles-Henri Morex (Bex)
Note: Corners: 10:9

19 June 1985 Round 30	Basel	2–0	Grasshopper Club	St. Jakob Stadium, Basel
20:00	Zbinden 29' (1:0); Andermatt 82' (2:0)	FCB summary	(yellow card) 31' Imhof	Attendance: 2,500; Referee: (Switzerland) Walter Nussbaumer (Crans-près-Céligny)
Note: FCB coach Emil Müller honored before the game (last match). Roger Wehrli's 300th NLA game.

==== Final league table ====
Pos	Team	Pld	W	D	L	GF	GA	GD	Pts	Qualification
1	Servette	30	19	8	3	71	28	+43	46	Swiss Champions qualified for 1985–86 European Cup
2	Aarau	30	16	10	4	62	43	+19	42	Swiss Cup winners qualified for 1985–86 Cup Winners' Cup and entered 1985 Intertoto Cup
3	Xamax	30	14	11	5	59	34	+25	39	Qualified for 1985–86 UEFA Cup
4	St. Gallen	30	13	11	6	66	32	+34	37	Qualified for 1985–86 UEFA Cup and entered 1985 Intertoto Cup
5	Sion	30	14	8	8	56	49	+7	36	Entered 1985 Intertoto Cup
6	Grasshopper Club	30	11	10	9	53	47	+6	32	
7	Zürich	30	11	9	10	59	52	+7	31	
8	Basel	30	11	9	10	46	49	−3	31	
9	Young Boys	30	10	10	10	42	45	−3	30	Entered 1985 Intertoto Cup
10	Lausanne-Sport	30	10	9	11	50	57	−7	29	
11	Wettingen	30	7	12	11	31	35	−4	26	
12	Luzern	30	9	8	13	33	53	−20	26	
13	Vevey-Sports	30	9	6	15	40	47	−7	24	
14	La Chaux-de-Fonds	30	6	12	12	41	54	−13	24	
15	SC Zug	30	4	6	20	27	71	−44	14	Relegated to 1985–86 Nationalliga B
16	Winterthur	30	4	5	21	32	72	−40	13	Relegated to 1985–86 Nationalliga B

Source: rsssf.com
Rules for classification: 1) Points; 2) Goal difference; 3) Goals scored; 4) Head-to-head points; 5) Away goals scored; 6) Draw.

=== Swiss Cup ===
15 September 1984 Round 3	FC Dürrenast	0–4	Basel	Stadion Lachen, Thun
16:00		FCB summary	19' (0:1) Andermatt; 37' (0:2) Grossenbacher; (yellow card) 40' Feigenwinter; 72' (0:3) Zbinden; 88' (0:4) Sutter	Attendance: 1,500; Referee: (Switzerland) Freddy Philippoz (Sion)
Note: FC Dürrenast played the 1984–85 season in the 2. Liga (fourth-tier). Corners: 5:19 (1:8)

20 October 1984 Round 4	Basel	6–0	FC Langenthal	St. Jakob Stadium, Basel
17:30	Nadig 32' (1:0); Hauser 47' (2:0); Nadig 57' (3:0); Hauser 60' (4:0); Sutter 75' (5:0); Sutter 77' (6:0)	FCB summary		Attendance: 1,200; Referee: (Switzerland) Alfred Heinis (Ammannsegg, Biberist)
Note: FC Langenthal played the 1984–85 season in the NLB (second-tier). Corners: 12:4. Fair game no yellow cards.

17 March 1985 Round of 16	Basel	0–1	Servette	St. Jakob Stadium, Basel
14:30		FCB summary	41' (0:1) Kok	Attendance: 5,300; Referee: (Switzerland) Bruno Galler (Kirchdorf, Bern)
Note: Fair game no yellow cards.

== See also ==
- History of FC Basel
- List of FC Basel players
- List of FC Basel seasons

== Sources ==
- Rotblau: Jahrbuch Saison 2015/2016. Publisher: FC Basel Marketing AG. ISBN 978-3-7245-2050-4
- Die ersten 125 Jahre. Publisher: Josef Zindel im Friedrich Reinhardt Verlag, Basel. ISBN 978-3-7245-2305-5
- The FCB squad 1984–85 at fcb-archiv.ch
- 1984–85 at RSSSF
