= Dominik Leder =

Swiss footballer (born 1964)

Personal information
- Full name: Dominik Leder
- Date of birth: 4 October 1964 (age 62)
- Place of birth: Switzerland
- Position: Goalkeeper

Youth career
- until 1983: Concordia Basel

Senior career*
Years	Team	Apps	(Gls)
1983–1984	FC Concordia Basel		
1984–1987	FC Basel	4	(0)
- * Club domestic league appearances and goals

Dominik Leder (born 4 October 1964) was a Swiss footballer who played in the 1980s. He played as goalkeeper.

Leder played his youth football with Concordia Basel and advanced to their first team during the 1983–84 season to the 1st League, the third tier of Swiss football.

Leder joined FC Basel's first team for their 1984–85 season under head-coach Ernst August Künnecke and Emil Müller. During his first two seasons with Basel Leder played only in test games. He played his domestic league debut for the club in the home game in the St. Jakob Stadium on 23 May 1987 as Basel were beaten 2–4 by Luzern.

Between the years 1984 and 1987 Leder played a total of 17 games for Basel. Four of these games were in the Nationalliga A and 13 were friendly games.

== Sources ==
- Dominik Leder at WorldFootball.net
- Die ersten 125 Jahre. Publisher: Josef Zindel im Friedrich Reinhardt Verlag, Basel. ISBN 978-3-7245-2305-5
- Verein "Basler Fussballarchiv" Homepage
