= Fredy Grossenbacher =

Swiss footballer (born 1965)

Personal information
- Full name: Alfred Grossenbacher
- Date of birth: 10 August 1965 (age 61)
- Place of birth: Basel
- Height: 1.86 m (6 ft 1 in)
- Position: Defender

Youth career
- –1982: Concordia Basel

Senior career*
Years	Team	Apps	(Gls)
1982–1983	Concordia Basel		
1983–1987	Basel	74	(5)
1987–1990	Servette	33	(2)
1990–1992	Young Boys	35	(0)

International career
1985–1987	Switzerland U-21	5	(0)
1987–1988	Switzerland	2	(0)
- * Club domestic league appearances and goals

Fredy Grossenbacher (born 10 August 1965) is a retired Swiss football defender who played in the 1980's and early 90's. He also advanced to play for Switzerland's national team, but an injury ended his career early.

== Early football ==
Born and bred in Basel, Grossenbacher played his youth football in the youth department of Concordia Basel and advanced to their first team in 1982. At that time, Concordia played in the 1982–83 1. Liga (third-tier of Swiss football).

== Basel ==
Grossenbacher made his next step just one year later and joined Basel's first team for their 1983–84 season under head coach Ernst August Künnecke. Künnecke left the youngster with their reserve team for the first half of the season, but after the winter break brought him up to the first team. After playing in five test games, Grossenbacher played his domestic league debut for the club in the home game at the St. Jakob Stadium on 11 March 1984 as Basel played a 1–1 draw against Sion. Grossenbacher played 14 of the remaining 16 matches that spring and in all but one of them over the full 90 minutes.

At the beginning of their 1984–85 season, Grossenbacher was again a starting player. However, the team had a bad run to the start of the new season and Künnecke quickly placed him on the substitutions-bench. Despite his first goal for his team on 15 September 1984 in the away Swiss Cup match at the Stadion Lachen, in Thun, as Basel won 4–0 against fourth-tier FC Dürrenast (it was the second goal of the game) Grossenbacher was not able to regain his starting slot in the team. However, with the team winning only one of the first eleven games in the league, head coach Künnecke lost his job. He was replaced ad-interim by Emil Mille Müller. Müller knew Grossenbacher from his youth years and placed him immediately in the starting eleven for the home game against Luzern and the youngster repaid his new coach for the given faith with his first league goal for them and the team won 4–1. The team's form improved and they rose in the league table, clear of the relegation area. Grossenbacher was able to hold his starting place in the team and in the following season, under head coach Helmut Benthaus too. However toward the end of the season, Grossenbacher suffered a knee ligament injury and he needed eight months recovery time.

In summer 1987 Grossenbach left the club. Between the years 1983 and 1987 he played a total of 127 games for Basel scoring a total of 10 goals. 74 of these games were in the Swiss Super League, 7 in the Swiss Cup and 46 were friendly games. He scored 5 goals in the domestic league, 1 in the cup and the others were scored during the test games.

== Servette and Young Boys ==
Grossenbacher moved on and in July 1987 he signed for Servette. During his first two seasons with them he received playing time, but his injury still bothered him and he missed nearly the entire 1988–89 season. After three seasons with Servette, Grossenbacher moved on again. For Servette he played 33 league matches scoring 2 goals. He also scored the winning goal in the 1988–89 UEFA Cup first round tie against Sturm Graz as Servette proceeded to the second round.

In the summer of 1990 he signed with the Young Boys in Bern. To the beginning of his contract things went well, but due to his recurring injury, he again missed nearly the entire 1991–92 season. Grossenbacher was, therefore, forced to retire from an active football career. For Young Boys he played 35 league matches without scoring a goal.

== International ==
In April 1985 Grossenbacher was called up to the Switzerland U-21 team by manager Rolf Blättler. He made his debut on 16 April against the Soviet Union U-21 in the qualification round of the 1986 UEFA European Under-21 Championship as the Swiss won 4–2. He played in two matches in this qualfying stage. He also made another appearance in the 1988 UEFA European Under-21 Championship and in two friendly games. Blättler advanced to Switzerland's senior side and he called Grossenbacher up for them as well and he had two appearances in friendly games. His debut was on 26 August 1987 against Norway.
