= Beat Feigenwinter =

Swiss footballer (born 1960)

Personal information
- Date of birth: 5 May 1960 (age 66)
- Place of birth: Switzerland
- Position: Defender

Youth career
- –1979: FC Nordstern Basel

Senior career*
Years	Team	Apps	(Gls)
1979–1984	FC Nordstern Basel	97	(3)
1984–1985	FC Basel	3	(0)
- * Club domestic league appearances and goals

Beat Feigenwinter (born 5 May 1960) is a Swiss retired professional footballer who played in the 1980s. He played as defender.

Feigenwinter played his youth football with Nordstern Basel and advanced to their first team during the 1979–1980 season as the team achieved promotion to the Nationalliga A. Feigenwinter played with Nordstern for a further four season, despite suffering relegation at the end of the 1981–82 Nationalliga A season.

Feigenwinter then joined FC Basel's first team for their 1984–85 season under head-coach Ernst August Künnecke and Emil Müller. After playing in seven test games Feigenwinter played his domestic league debut for his new club in the away game on 25 August 1984 as Basel won 2–1 against Winterthur.

In his one season with the club, Feigenwinter played a total of 17 games for Basel without scoring a goal. Three of these games were in the Nationalliga A, one in the Swiss Cup and 13 were friendly games.

== Sources ==
- Beat Feigenwinter at WorldFootball.net
- Die ersten 125 Jahre. Publisher: Josef Zindel im Friedrich Reinhardt Verlag, Basel. ISBN 978-3-7245-2305-5
- Verein "Basler Fussballarchiv" Homepage
