= Franz Michelberger =

German footballer

Personal information
- Date of birth: 28 August 1955 (age 71)
- Place of birth: Bad Saulgau, West Germany
- Height: 1.80 m (5 ft 11 in)
- Position: Midfielder

Senior career*
Years	Team	Apps	(Gls)
1974–1976	Bayern Munich	4	(0)
1976–1977	BSV 07 Schwenningen	25	(2)
1977–1978	Eintracht Trier	37	(9)
1978–1979	Reims	29	(2)
1979–1981	Eintracht Trier	74	(21)
1981–1984	Kickers Offenbach	88	(26)
1984–1985	FC Wettingen	26	(10)
1985–1986	FC Grenchen	23	(6)
Total		306	(76)
- * Club domestic league appearances and goals

Franz Michelberger (born 28 August 1955) is a German former professional footballer who played as a midfielder.

== Honours ==
Bayern Munich

- European Cup: 1974–75, 1975–76
- Intercontinental Cup: 1976
