= Ertan Irizik =

Swiss footballer (born 1964)

Personal information
- Full name: Ertan Irizik
- Date of birth: 1 December 1964 (age 61)
- Place of birth: Istanbul, Turkey
- Position: Defender

Youth career
- until 1982: Concordia Basel

Senior career*
| Years | Team | Apps | (Gls) |
| 1982–1984 | Concordia Basel | | |
| 1984–1986 | Basel | 48 | (0) |
| 1986–1995 | St. Gallen | 213 | (3) |
| 1995–1996 | TuS Celle | 14 | (1) |
| 1986–1995 | St. Gallen | 29 | (0) |
| 1995–1997 | Gossau | | |
- * Club domestic league appearances and goals

Ertan Irizik (born 1 December 1964) is a Swiss retired football defender.

== Private life ==
Born in Istanbul, Turkey, Irizik moved to Switzerland with his siblings, in the early 1970s, to re-join their mother who had remarried following the accidental death of the children's father. Irizik is the elder half-brother of Murat and Hakan Yakin. Irizik worked for both of them as advisor from the very beginning of their football careers.

== Football career ==
Irizik played his youth football with Concordia Basel and in 1982 advanced to their first team, who at that time played in the 1. Liga, the third tier of the Swiss football league system. He then joined FC Basel, in the NLA, for their 1984–85 season under head coach Ernst-August Künnecke. After playing in 12 test games, Irizik played his domestic league debut for his new club in the away game at the Hardturm on 15 August 1984 as Basel were defeated 0–3 by Grasshopper Club. Irizik appeared in 22 of the team's 30 league games, all but two in the starting 11. The following season Helmut Benthaus returned to Basel and was new head coach. Irizik stayed with the club only these two seasons and during this time he played a total of 86 games for Basel scoring 3 goals. 48 of these games were in the Nationalliga A, 6 in the Swiss Cup and 32 were friendly games. All three of these goals were scored during the test games.

Irizik moved to the Espenmoos and signed for St. Gallen. In the summer of 1986, the defender was one of the numerous newly signed players by FCSG and Irizik impressed the FCSG fans right from the beginning. The tough defender became a nightmare for most of the opposing strikers. He was strong in the forward movements, relentless when defending and soon earned himself the nickname "Eisenfuss" (Iron foot). Irizik stayed with the club for seven seasons, but at the end of the 1992–93 Nationalliga A season they suffered relegation.

There was trouble for Irizik, in the contract negotiations, following their relegation in the summer of 1993. Irizik, who became Swiss in 1991, complained that the transfer fee that the club was demanding for him was too high and, therefore, he bought his own release. Instead of going to the NLB with FCSG, the defender went to northern Germany in the regional league, then the third-highest league. TuS Celle had ambitions for promotion, but Irizik was not happy in Lower Saxony. His new team was soon involved in the relegation battle and, as early as the winter break, Irizik revoked his contract in Celle, returned to Switzerland and hoped for an offer from a second-tier club. Finally, in July 1994, shortly before the start of the new season, FCSG, who had won promotion back in to the NLA, signed him on a one-year contract. New coach Uwe Rapolder now used Irizik more often in midfield, which gave him wings again. But as his contract expired Irizik left the club. Between the years 1986 to 1993 and again from 1994 to 1995 Iritik played a total of 242 league games for FCSG scoring 3 goals.

Irizik moved on to play for Gossau in the third tier of Swiss football. He was not only player, but also employed as assistant trainer. At the end of the 1995–96 season Gossau won the Group 4 title and after defeating FC Ascona and Bellinzona in the play-off round were promoted. However, just one season later they suffered relegation and Irizik retired from his professional football career. Irizik then moved on to Brühl St. Gallen as amateur player and was also employed as assistant trainer.

== Sources ==
- Die ersten 125 Jahre. Publisher: Josef Zindel im Friedrich Reinhardt Verlag, Basel. ISBN 978-3-7245-2305-5
- Ertan Irizik on Verein "Basler Fussballarchiv" site
- I for Irizik on FCSG-Data site
