= Paul Wolfisberg =

Swiss footballer and coach (1933–2020)

Personal information
- Date of birth: 15 June 1933
- Place of birth: Horw, Switzerland
- Date of death: 24 August 2020 (aged 87)
- Place of death: Horw, Switzerland
- Position: Forward

Senior career*
Years	Team	Apps	(Gls)
1950–1954	FC Luzern		
1954–1955	FC Biel-Bienne		
1955–1966	FC Luzern		

Managerial career
- 1966–1973: SC Buochs
- 1975: FC Luzern
- 1975–1977: SC Kriens
- 1978–1981: FC Luzern
- 1981–1985: Switzerland
- * Club domestic league appearances and goals

Paul Wolfisberg (15 June 1933 – 24 August 2020) was a Swiss football player and coach.

== Biography ==
Born in 1933 in Horw, Wolfisberg first played for FC Horw before joining FC Luzern at the age of 17. In 1954, he joined FC Biel-Bienne while studying at the Technicum in Biel/Bienne. He returned to Luzern in 1955 after being recruited by coach Rudi Gutendorf. In 1960, he won the Swiss Cup as captain of FC Luzern. He retired as a footballer in 1966.

In 1966, Wolfisberg became manager of SC Buochs, which led the Swiss Challenge League in 1972. After temporarily leaving his post, he returned in December 1972 for the second round. He returned to FC Luzern in 1975 as co-manager alongside Josef Vogel, replacing Ilijas Pašić and was soon replaced by Otto Luttrop. He returned to coaching in October 1975, leading SC Kriens, where he succeeded the late Egon Milder. He was relieved of his coaching duties in 1977 but was retained as a technical director of the club. In 1978, he became technical director at FC Luzern, which led the Swiss Super League in 1979.

In 1981, Wolfisberg was appointed head coach of the Switzerland national team, leading 52 matches until 1985, when he was axed following a failure to qualify for the 1986 FIFA World Cup. In 1989, he supported Uli Stielike as head of the National Team.

Wolfisberg died at his home in Horw on 24 August 2020 at the age of 87.
