= Thomas Süss =

German association football player

Personal information
- Full name: Thomas Süss
- Date of birth: 6 April 1962 (age 64)
- Place of birth: Rheinfelden, Germany
- Height: 1.84 m (6 ft 0 in)
- Position: Defender

Youth career
- VfR Rheinfelden

Senior career*
Years	Team	Apps	(Gls)
until 1980	VfR Rheinfelden		
1980–1983	Nordstern Basel	80	(2)
1983–1987	FC Basel	97	(0)
1987–1991	Karlsruher SC	109	(6)
1991–1996	SV Wehen Wiesbaden		
- * Club domestic league appearances and goals

Thomas Süss (born 6 April 1962) is a former professional German footballer who played in the 1980s and 1990s. He played as midfielder.

Born in Rheinfelden (Baden) Süss played his youth football for local club VfR Rheinfelden and advanced to their first team in 1979. Nordstern Basel had been observing Süss and they signed him for the 1980–81 Nationalliga A season. In the season 1981–82 Nordstern suffered relegation. However, Süss stayed with the club for another season. However, suffering due to financial difficulties, the club could not achieve immediate promotion and were forced to sell money bringing players and Süss was one of these players.

Süss then joined FC Basel's first team for their 1983–84 season under team manager Ernst August Künnecke. Süss played his domestic league debut for the club in the away game on 10 August 1983 as Basel were defeated 2–4 by AC Bellinzona.

Between the years 1983 and 1987 Süss played a total of 167 games for Basel scoring two goals. 97 of these games were in the Nationalliga A, seven in the Swiss Cup and 63 were friendly games. He scored both his goals during the test games.

In the summer of 1987 Süss signed a contract with Bundesliga club Karlsruher SC. In the first game of the 1987–88 Bundesliga season, on 1 August 1987, Süss made his debut in the home game against 1. FC Köln. He formed the KSC defense together with Srećko Bogdan, Oliver Kreuzer, Karl-Heinz Wöhrlin and Wolfgang Trapp in the 1-1 draw. In four seasons at KSC, the defender played 109 first division games (six goals). On June 15, 1991, the last match day of the 1990–91 Bundesliga season, the defensive player completed his last competitive game for Karlsruher SC (2–2 against Hamburger SV). In 1991 he moved to the lower tier SV Wehen Wiesbaden.

== Sources ==
- Die ersten 125 Jahre. Publisher: Josef Zindel im Friedrich Reinhardt Verlag, Basel. ISBN 978-3-7245-2305-5
- Verein "Basler Fussballarchiv" Homepage
