= Rolf Lauper =

Swiss footballer (1960-2006)

Personal information
- Full name: Rolf Lauper
- Date of birth: 17 January 1960
- Place of birth: Bergdietikon, Switzerland
- Date of death: 18 August 2006 (aged 46)
- Position: Defender

Youth career
- until 1976: Young Fellows Zürich

Senior career*
Years	Team	Apps	(Gls)
1976–1978	Young Fellows Zürich	12	(0)
1978–1981	Grasshopper Club Zürich	34	(0)
1982–1983	FC Wettingen	31	(0)
1983–1985	FC Basel	49	(0)
1986–1989	FC Baden	63	(2)
1989–1991	SC Zug	58	(0)
1991–1993	FC Brüttisellen	41	(3)
- * Club domestic league appearances and goals

Rolf Lauper (17 January 1960 – 18 August 2006) was a Swiss footballer who played in the late 1970s, the 1980s and early 1990s as defender.

Lauper played his youth football with Young Fellows Zürich and advanced to their first team during their promotion season 1976–77 from the Nationalliga B, the second tier of Swiss football. Lauper stayed with the club in the 1977–78 Nationalliga A. But this was not a successful season and the club suffered relegation.

Before the 1978–79 Nationalliga A season, Lauper signed a contract with Grasshopper Club. He stayed with the club for two and a half years, before he moved on to FC Wettingen who at that time played in the Nationalliga B. With Wettingen in the 1981–82 Nationalliga B season Lauper won promotion. He stayed with the club for one more season.

Lauper joined FC Basel's first team for their 1983–84 season under team manager Ernst August Künnecke. After playing in ten test games, Lauper played his domestic league debut for the club in the away game on 10 August 1983 as Basel were defeated 2–4 by AC Bellinzona.

In his two seasons with the club, Lauper played a total of 106 games for Basel scoring five goals. 49 of these games were in the Nationalliga A, four in the Swiss Cup and 53 were friendly games. He scored all five goals during the test games.

Following Basel, Lauper moved to FC Baden in the Nationalliga B for three seasons then to SC Zug for two seasons. Finally he ended his football career spending two seasons with FC Brüttisellen, who escaped relegation in the 1991–92 season, but suffered relegation the next.

== Sources ==
- Die ersten 125 Jahre. Publisher: Josef Zindel im Friedrich Reinhardt Verlag, Basel. ISBN 978-3-7245-2305-5
- Verein "Basler Fussballarchiv" Homepage
