= Livio Bordoli =

Swiss footballer (born 1963)

Personal information
- Date of birth: 31 August 1963 (age 63)
- Position: Midfielder

Senior career*
Years	Team	Apps	(Gls)
1984	FC Basel		
1984–1985	FC Locarno		
1986–1987	AC Bellinzona		
1987–1989	FC Chiasso		
1989–1990	AC Bellinzona		
1990–1991	BSC Old Boys		

Managerial career
- 2009–2010: FC Locarno
- 2020–2011: FC Wohlen
- 2012–2013: FC Chiasso
- 2013: AC Bellinzona
- 2013–2015: FC Lugano
- 2015: FC Aarau
- 2018: FC Winterthur
- * Club domestic league appearances and goals

Livio Bordoli (born 31 August 1963) is a retired Swiss football midfielder and later manager.
