= Adrie van Kraay =

Dutch footballer

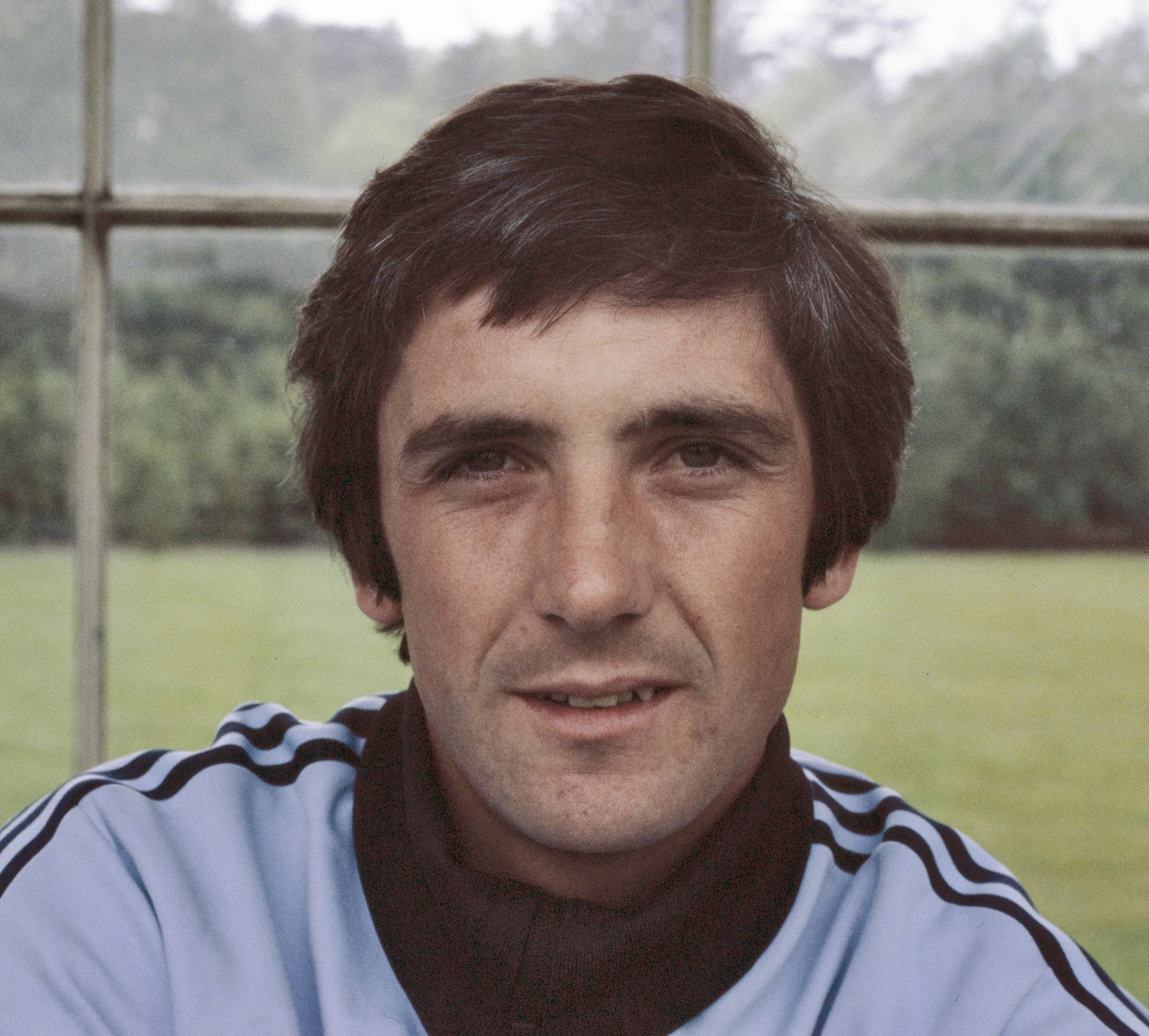
- Adrie van Kraay in 1978

Personal information
- Full name: Adrianus Ambrosius Cornelis van Kraaij
- Date of birth: 1 August 1953 (age 73)
- Place of birth: Eindhoven, Netherlands
- Height: 1.84 m (6 ft 1/2 in)
- Position: Defender

Senior career*
Years	Team	Apps	(Gls)
1971–1982	PSV Eindhoven	309	(5)
1982–1984	Waterschei Thor	57	(1)
1984–1985	FC Basel	17	(0)
Total		383	(6)

International career
1975–1979	Netherlands	17	(0)
Medal record
Representing Netherlands
FIFA World Cup
Runner-up	1978 Argentina
UEFA European Championship
Third place	1976 Yugoslavia
- * Club domestic league appearances and goals

Adrianus Ambrosius Cornelis van Kraaij (born 1 August 1953 in Eindhoven, North Brabant), commonly known as Adrie van Kraay, is a retired football central defender from the Netherlands.

== Career ==
Van Kraaij represented his native country at the 1978 FIFA World Cup in Argentina, wearing the number four jersey. He played for PSV Eindhoven from 1971 until 1982, making 309 appearances and five scores for his club. At the end of his career, he had short spells at K. Waterschei S.V. Thor Genk of Belgium and FC Basel of Switzerland. From 2008 until 2010, Van Kraay was director of football at PSV Eindhoven, after Stan Valckx left the club.
