= Alfred Lüthi (footballer) =

Swiss footballer (born 1958)

Personal information
- Full name: Alfred Lüthi
- Date of birth: 22 May 1958 (age 68)
- Place of birth: Switzerland
- Position: Midfielder

Senior career*
Years	Team	Apps	(Gls)
–1981	FC Subingen		
1981–1986	FC Basel	105	(6)
1986–1988	FC Grenchen	67	(17)
1988–1992	Old Boys	116	(14)
- * Club domestic league appearances and goals

Alfred Lüthi (born 22 May 1958) is a Swiss former footballer who played in the 1980s and early 1990s as midfielder.

== Football career ==
Lüthi first played with local club FC Subingen in the fourth tier of the Swiss football league system. He joined Basel's first team for their 1981–82 season under head coach Helmut Benthaus. Lüthi's first game was in the Cup of the Alps, played in Stade Armand-Cesari away against French team Bastia and Basel won 4–0.

After then playing in four test games, Lüthi played his domestic league debut for his new club in the home game in the St. Jakob Stadium on 29 August 1981. Lüthi was substituted in the 70th minute and he then scored his first goal for his club as Basel won 1–0 against FC Bulle.

Lüthi played with Basel for five seasons and during this time Lüthi played a total of 206 games for Basel scoring a total of 18 goals. 105 of these games were in the Nationalliga A, 13 in the Swiss Cup, two in the Swiss League Cup, three in the Cup of the Alps and 83 were friendly games. He scored six goals in the domestic league, the others were scored during the test games.

Following his time with Basel, Lüthy moved on and played two seasons with Grenchen, who at that time played in the Nationaliga B. Lüthi then returned to the city of Basel, but this time he signed for Old Boys, also in the Nationaliga B. He stayed with them until summer 1992, when he retired from his professional playing career.

== Sources ==
- Rotblau: Jahrbuch Saison 2017/2018. Publisher: FC Basel Marketing AG. ISBN 978-3-7245-2189-1
- Die ersten 125 Jahre. Publisher: Josef Zindel im Friedrich Reinhardt Verlag, Basel. ISBN 978-3-7245-2305-5
- Verein "Basler Fussballarchiv" Homepage
