= Guido Rudin =

Swiss footballer (born 1963)

Personal information
- Full name: Guido Rudin
- Date of birth: 13 January 1963 (age 63)
- Positions: Defender; midfielder

Senior career*
Years	Team	Apps	(Gls)
1982–1985	FC Basel	11	(0)
- * Club domestic league appearances and goals

Guido Rudin (born 13 January 1963) was a Swiss footballer who played in the 1980s. He played mainly as defender, but also as midfielder.

Rudin played his youth football with FC Basel and joined their first team in their 1982–83 season under head coach Rainer Ohlhauser. In that season he played in just one test match as Basel won against Old Boys 2–0 on the Schützenmatte. After another three test matches, Rudin played his domestic league debut for the club in the away game in the Stade Tourbillon in Sion, on 13 November 1982 as Basel were defeated 3–5 by FC Sion.

Between the years 1982 and 1985 Rudin played a total of 36 games for Basel scoring just one goal. 11 of these games were in the Nationalliga A, one was in the Swiss Cup and 24 were friendly games. He scored his only goal in the test game on 30 January 1985 as Basel won 1–0 against German team 1. FC Herzogenaurach during a trainings camp in Lanzarote.

== Sources ==
- Die ersten 125 Jahre. Publisher: Josef Zindel im Friedrich Reinhardt Verlag, Basel. ISBN 978-3-7245-2305-5
- Verein "Basler Fussballarchiv" Homepage
