= Emil Müller (footballer) =

Swiss footballer and manager (1933-2001)

Personal information
- Full name: Emil Müller
- Date of birth: 14 July 1933
- Place of birth: Switzerland
- Date of death: 2001
- Place of death: Basel, Switzerland
- Position: Striker

Senior career*
Years	Team	Apps	(Gls)
until 1957	FC Black Stars Basel		
1957–1958	FC Basel	3	(1)
1958–	FC Black Stars Basel		

Managerial career
- 1984–1985: FC Basel
- 1989–1992: FC Münchenstein
- * Club domestic league appearances and goals

Emil Müller (born 14 July 1933) was a Swiss footballer and later football manager. He played in the late 1950s and 1960s as forward. He was youth trainer for various clubs, interims coach for FC Basel and FC Münchenstein.

Müller first played for FC Black Stars Basel, who at that time were playing in the fourth tier of Swiss football. He joined FC Basel's first team for their 1957–58 season under manager Rudi Strittich. After playing in four test games, in which he scored four goals, Müller played his domestic league debut for his new club in the away game on 8 September 1957 as Basel were defeated 0–2 by Lugano. Müller scored his first domestic league goal for his club on 6 October in the home game at the Landhof against Grenchen, but this goal could not save the team from a 3–4 defeat.

In his one season with the club, Müller played a total of 11 games for Basel scoring a total of 6 goals. Three of these games were in the Nationalliga A, two in the Swiss Cup and six were friendly games. He scored that one goal in the domestic league, one in the cup and the other four were scored during the test games. After his season with Basel Müller returned to his club of origin Black Stars Basel.

In later years Müller became trainer and football manager. In 1983 Ernst August Künnecke was hired as team coach for FC Basel and Emil Müller was appointed as his assistant. Then during the 1984–85 season, Basel's club chairman Urs Gribi fired Künnecke following a league run of four defeats and six draws with only one win. Gribi installed Müller as head coach up until the end of the season and he was able to lead the team away from the relegation zone.

In 1989 Müller was appointed as manager for local club FC Münchenstein and remained here for three seasons. During the following years Müller was trainer of other local clubs. He died after an illness in February 2001.

== Sources ==
- Rotblau: Jahrbuch Saison 2017/2018. Publisher: FC Basel Marketing AG. ISBN 978-3-7245-2189-1
- Die ersten 125 Jahre. Publisher: Josef Zindel im Friedrich Reinhardt Verlag, Basel. ISBN 978-3-7245-2305-5
- Verein "Basler Fussballarchiv" Homepage
