= 1990–91 FC Basel season =

FC Basel
1990–91 season
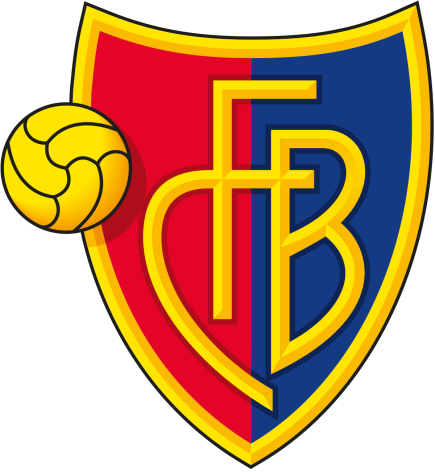
- Club president: Charles Röthlisberger
- Head coach: Ernst-August Künnecke
- Ground: St. Jakob Stadium, Basel
- Nationalliga B: Qualifying Phase 4th of 12
- Promotion/relegation round: Promotion Phase 4th of 8
- Swiss Cup: Eliminated in 2nd round
- Top goalscorer: League: Brian Bertelsen (11); All: Brian Bertelsen (11)
- Highest home attendance: 8,000 on 17 March 1991 vs St. Gallen
- Lowest home attendance: 900 on 22 December 1990 vs Schaffhausen
- Average home league attendance: 3,538

The Fussball Club Basel 1893 1990–91 season was their 97th season since the club's foundation. Charles Röthlisberger was the club's chairman for the third consecutive year. FC Basel played their home games in the St. Jakob Stadium. Following their relegation in the 1987–88 season this was their third season in the second-tier of Swiss football.

== Overview ==
Ernst August Künnecke returned to the club, having taken over from Urs Siegenthaler as first-team coach during the previous. After missing promotion the previous two seasons, the club's repeated priority aim was to return to the top flight of Swiss football. Only a few players left the team. Andre Rindlisbacher transferred to Bellinzona, Uwe Wassmer to Aarau and Ralph Thoma returned to his club of origin FC Rheinfelden. Rolf Baumann ended his active football career and returned to his hometown club VfL Kirchheim/Teck as head-coach. Four other players left the squad because their contracts were not renewed. In the other direction Brian Bertelsen and Reto Baumgartner moved in from Wettingen. Maximilian Heidenreich transferred in from Hannover 96. Three young players came in from local, lower-tier teams, Roman Künzli from FC Breitenbach, Roman Hangarter from FC Brüttisellen and Christian Marcolli from FC Aesch. Seven young players were brought up from the Basel youth team.

The 24 teams in the Nationalliga B (NLB) were divided into two groups, a South/East and a West group, to first play a qualification round. In the second stage the tops six teams in each group and the last four teams of the Nationalliga A (NLA) would play a promotion/relegation round, also divided into two groups. The top two teams in each of these groups would play in the top flight the next season. Basel were assigned to the South/East group. The first stage ran very moderately, there was no consistency in their games and matches were lost that should have been won. They ended their 22 matches in the Qualifying Phase with 9 victories, 8 draws and 5 defeats with 26 points in a disappointing fourth position in the league table. The team scored 40 goals and conceded 30.

Basel qualified for a promotion group and were assigned to group A. Also qualified for this group from the NLB were Chiasso, Yverdon-Sports, Fribourg, Baden and Etoile Carouge. Fighting against their relegation from the NLA were St. Gallen and Wettingen. At the start of this phase Basel lost two games, away against Yverdon-Sports and at home against St. Gallen and therefore they were in arrears right from the beginning. Even the away victory against Wettingen didn't help much, because they were defeated at home by FC Baden just two rounds later. A few weeks later the back to back home defeat against Wettingen and the defeat in the Espenmoos against St. Gallen decided the promotion/relegation phase to the benefit of these two teams. Basel ended their 14 matches in the promotion/relegation phase with just four victories, four draws, suffering six defeats with 12 points in a very disappointing fourth position in the league table and missed promotion again.

In the 1990–91 Swiss Cup second round Basel were drawn with an away game against lower-tier, local club FC Pratteln. But Basel were sent home suffering an embarrassing 4–0 defeat. A red card for Peter Bernauer just after half time, as the game was still goalless, made Basel very unsure. Pratteln took the lead and Basel were not able to give an adequate answer. In fact, in the last few minutes of the game, they fell completely apart and gave up two counter goals within less than 60 seconds.

== Players ==
The following is the list of the Basel first team squad. It also includes players that were in the squad the day the season started on 25 July 1990, but subsequently left the club after that date. Note: Flags indicate national team as defined under FIFA eligibility rules; some limited exceptions apply. Players may hold more than one non-FIFA nationality.

No.	Pos.	Nation	Player
—	GK	SUI	Roger Glanzmann
—	GK	SUI	Thomas Grüter
—	GK	SUI	Roman Künzli (from FC Breitenbach)
—	DF	SUI	Olivier Bauer
—	DF	SUI	Reto Baumgartner (from Wettingen)
—	DF	GER	Peter Bernauer
—	DF	SUI	Massimo Ceccaroni
—	MF	GER	Uwe Dittus
—	DF	YUG	Miodrag Đurđević
—	DF	SUI	Patrick Liniger (from youth team)
—	DF	SUI	Thomas Karrer (from youth team)
—	DF	SUI	Sascha Reich
—	DF	SUI	Martin Thalmann (from youth team)
—	MF	GER	Rolf Baumann (to VfL Kirchheim/Teck as coach)
—	MF	DEN	Brian Bertelsen (from Wettingen)

No.	Pos.	Nation	Player
—	MF	ITA	Vittorio Gottardi
—	MF	GER	Maximilian Heidenreich (from Hannover 96)
—	MF	ITA	Boris Mancastroppa
—	MF	ESP	Enrique Mata
—	MF	SUI	Andreas Steiner (from youth team)
—	MF	GER	Manfred Wagner
—	FW	ITA	Germano Fanciulli
—	FW	SUI	Roman Hangarter (from FC Brüttisellen)
—	FW	SUI	Erni Maissen
—	FW	SUI	Christian Marcolli (from FC Aesch)
—	FW	SUI	Patrick Rahmen
—	FW	GER	Frank Wittmann (from youth team)
—	FW	SUI	Ruedi Zbinden
—		SUI	Rocco Verrelli (from youth team)
—		SUI	Mathias Walther (from youth team)

Players who left the squad

Note: Flags indicate national team as defined under FIFA eligibility rules; some limited exceptions apply. Players may hold more than one non-FIFA nationality.

No.	Pos.	Nation	Player
—	DF	SUI	Markus Hodel
—	MF	SUI	Beat Aebi
—	MF	GER	Olaf Berg

No.	Pos.	Nation	Player
—	MF	SUI	Andre Rindlisbacher (to Bellinzona)
—	MF	SUI	René Spicher
—	FW	GER	Uwe Wassmer (to Aarau)
—	FW	SUI	Ralph Thoma (to FC Rheinfelden)

== Results ==
Legend

Win Draw Loss Postponed

=== Friendly matches ===
==== Pre-season ====
10 July 1990 Pre-season	FV Möhringen (Germany)	0–9	(Switzerland) Basel	Möhringen an der Donau
		FCB summary	Goal	Referee: (Germany)

11 July 1990 Pre-season	Aarau (Switzerland)	0–0 (a.e.t.) (5–3 p)	(Switzerland) Basel	Moos, Balsthal
19:30		FCB summary		Attendance: 550; Referee: (Switzerland) Francis Fischer (Arch)
	Penalties
	Penalty scored		Penalty missed Penalty scored
Note: Sempione-Cup, semi-final.

14 July 1990 Exhibition game	Basel (Switzerland)	1–2	(Switzerland) Zürich	Moos, Balsthal
17:00	Zbinden 6' (pen. 1:0)	FCZ summary FCB summary	14' (1:1) Tréllez; 49' (1:2) Kok	Attendance: 500; Referee: (Switzerland) Urs Meier (Würenlos)
Note: Sempione-Cup, match for third place.

17 July 1990 Uhrencup preliminary stage	Lugano (Switzerland)	0–0 (a.e.t.) (3–4 p)	(Switzerland) Basel	Stadion Brühl, Grenchen
18:00		FCB summary		Attendance: 500; Referee: (Switzerland) René Gemperle (Bremgarten)
	Penalties
	Tami (penalty scored); Hertig (penalty missed); Ladner (penalty scored); Piserchia (penalty missed); Degiovannini (penalty scored)		(penalty missed) Rahmen; (penalty scored) Maissen; (penalty scored) Dittus; (penalty scored) Mata; (penalty scored) Zbinden
Note: The Uhrencup is a former club football tournament that was held annually in Grenchen in Switzerland.

19 July 1990 Uhrencup preliminary stage	Basel (Switzerland)	3–1	(Switzerland) Zürich	Stadion Brühl, Grenchen
20:00	Bertelsen 29' (1:0); Gottardi (yellow card) 31'; Maissen 52' (2:0); Zbinden 90' (3:1)	FCZ summary FCB summary	(yellow card) 63' Gilli; 80' (2:1) Kok	Attendance: 1,000; Referee: (Switzerland) Urs Meier (Würenlos)
Note: The Uhrencup is a former club football tournament that was held annually in Grenchen in Switzerland.

21 July 1990 Uhrencup final	Basel (Switzerland)	1–4	(Poland) Górnik Zabrze	Stadion Brühl, Grenchen
20:00	Rahmen 17' (1:0)	FCB summary	(yellow card) 8' Kraus; 41' (1:1) Brzoza; 46' (1:2) Staniek; 60' (1:3) Warzycha; 72' (1:4) Jegor	Attendance: 1,200; Referee: (Switzerland) Manfred Schlup, (Grenchen)
Note: The Uhrencup is a former club football tournament that was held annually in Grenchen in Switzerland.

==== Winter break ====
2 February 1991 Winter break	FC Laufen (Switzerland)	0–4	(Switzerland) Basel	Im Nau, Laufen
14:30		FCB summary	2' (o.g. 0:1) (R. Cueni); 22' (0:2) Marcolli; 33' (0:3) Mata; 48' (0:4) Bertelsen	Attendance: 200; Referee: (Switzerland) Gottfried Friedrich (Seedorf, Uri)

9 February 1991 Winter break	Basel (Switzerland)	0–0	(Germany) SC Freiburg	St. Jakob Stadium, Basel
14:30		FCB summary		Attendance: 52; Referee: (Switzerland) Rolf Blattmann (Zeiningen)
Note: Played behind closed doors.

12 February 1991 Winter break	Basel (Switzerland)	1–3	(Germany) Karlsruher SC	St. Jakob Stadium, Basel
20:00	Rahmen 59' (1:2)	FCB summary	14' (0:1) Reichert; 45' (0:2) Schütterle; 90' (1:3) Wittwer	Attendance: 350; Referee: (Switzerland) Serge Muhmenthaler (Grenchen)
Note: Played behind closed doors.

24 February 1991 Winter break	Basel (Switzerland)	1–2	(Switzerland) Grasshopper Club	St. Jakob Stadium, Basel
14:30	Bertelsen 46' (1:1)	FCB summary	13' (0:1) Salvi; 83' (1:2) Sforza; (yellow card) Gren	Attendance: 1,000; Referee: (Switzerland) Werner Müller (Obererlinsbach)

26 February 1991 Winter break	Basel (Switzerland)	0–1	(France) Strasbourg	St. Jakob Stadium, Basel
19:00		FCB summary	4' (0:1) Jenner	Attendance: 1,000; Referee: (Switzerland) Manfred Schlup, (Grenchen)

=== Nationalliga B ===
==== Qualifying Phase South East ====
25 July 1990 Round 1	Kriens	0–3	Basel	Stadion Kleinfeld, Kriens
20:00	Rohrer (yellow card) 71'	FCB summary	33' (0:1) Mata; 40' (0:2) Maissen; 48' (0:3) Bertelsen	Attendance: 1,500; Referee: (Switzerland) René Gemperle (Bremgarten)
Note: FCB youth player Patrick Liniger played his first ever league match in the starting formation.

28 July 1990 Round 2	Basel	1–2	Locarno	St. Jakob Stadium, Basel
20:00	Mata (yellow card) 35'; Gottardi 54' (1:1)	FCB summary	(yellow card) 9' Bützer; 52' (0:1) Schönwetter; 90' (1:2) Omini	Attendance: 4,300; Referee: (Switzerland) Pierre-Alain Eschmann (Moutier)

4 August 1990 Round 3	SC Zug	0–2	Basel	Herti Allmend Stadion, Zug
17:30	Schneider (penalty missed) 8′ Büeler (yellow card) 47' di Muro (yellow card) 78'	FCB summary	59' (0:1) Bertelsen; (yellow card) 75' Gottardi; 88' (0:2) Rahmen	Attendance: 750; Referee: (Switzerland) Rudolf Schödl
Note: 8th minute, FCB goalkeeper Thomas Grüter saved Schneider's penalty.

8 August 1990 Round 4	Basel	1–1	Winterthur	St. Jakob Stadium, Basel
20:00	Reich 31' (1:1)	FCB summary	23' (0:1) Maiano; (yellow card) 40' Battaini	Attendance: 3,800; Referee: (Switzerland) Hans Wieland (Grenchen)

11 August 1990 Round 5	Baden	2–0	Basel	Esp Stadium, Fislisbach
20:00	Sitek 22' (1:0); Lüdi (yellow card) 54'; Isler (yellow card) 71'; Zimmermann 74' (2:0)	FCB summary	(yellow card) 14' Wagner; (yellow card) 68' Đurđević	Attendance: 1,600; Referee: (Switzerland) Rudolf Michlig (Ostermundigen)

14 August 1990 Round 6	Basel	2–1	Emmenbrücke	St. Jakob Stadium, Basel
20:00	Maissen 11' (1:1); Dittus 69' (2:1); Bernauer (yellow card) 84'	FCB summary	8' (0:1) Eggeling; (yellow card) 29' Stadler; (yellow card) 40' Wicht; (yellow card) 51' Bühler; (yellow card) 66' Wyss; (yellow card) 78' Eggeling; (red card) 82' Schmid	Attendance: 2,000; Referee: (Switzerland) Roman Ullmann

25 August 1990 Round 7	Basel	2–2	Chiasso	St. Jakob Stadium, Basel
20:00	Reich 19' (1:0); Zbinden 41' (2:0); Mata (yellow card) 44'	FCB summary	71' (2:1) Jeannoteguy; (yellow card) 75' Gatti; 81' (2:2) Da Silva	Attendance: 2,100; Referee: (Switzerland) Paul-Louis Christe (Lausanne)

1 September 1990 Round 8	Bellinzona	0–0	Basel	Stadio Comunale Bellinzona
20:00	Piccinali (yellow card) 87'	FCB summary	(yellow card) 49' Gottardi; (yellow card) 51' Grüter; (yellow card) 57' Đurđević; (yellow card) 89' Zbinden	Attendance: 1,200; Referee: (Switzerland) Ludwig Zurkirchen

5 September 1990 Round 9	Glarus	0–0	Basel	Sportplatz Buchholz, Glarus
20:00	Fischer (yellow card) 68'	FCB summary		Attendance: 1,250; Referee: (Switzerland) Arturo Martino (Neukirch an der Thur)

15 September 1990 Round 10	Basel	0–3	Chur	St. Jakob Stadium, Basel
20:00	Gottardi (yellow card) 46'; Dittus (yellow card) 68'	FCB summary	29' (o.g.); 34' (pen. 0:2) Costantini; (yellow card) 37' Sommerhalder; (yellow card) 67' Costantini; 88' (0:3) Costantini; (yellow card) 89' Camenisch	Attendance: 2,600; Referee: (Switzerland) Francesco Bianchi (Chiasso)

22 September 1990 Round 11	Schaffhausen	3–2	Basel	Stadion Breite, Schaffhausen
20:00	Löw 14' (1:0); Engesser 28' (2:0); Engesser 80' (pen. 3:1)	FCB summary	72' (pen. 2:1) Dittus; 86' (3:2) Bernauer	Attendance: 1,700; Referee: (Switzerland) Werner Müller (Obererlinsbach)

6 October 1990 Round 12	Basel	2–1	Kriens	St. Jakob Stadium, Basel
20:00	Bertelsen 61' (1:0); Reich 82' (2:1)	FCB summary	(yellow card) 24' Lötscher; (yellow card) 33' Künzi; 63' (1:1) Pekas	Attendance: 1,800; Referee: (Switzerland) Jean-Claude Tagliabue

9 October 1990 Round 13	Locarno	2–3	Basel	Stadio del Lido, Locarno
20:00	Giani (yellow card) 27'; Costas 24' (1:0); Pedrotti 52' (2:1)	FCB summary	40' (1:1) Baumgartner; 55' (2:2) Baumgartner; (yellow card) 61' Reich; 77' (2:3) Bertelsen; (yellow card) 84' Dittus	Attendance: 1,600; Referee: (Switzerland) Robert Grisch (Schaanwald)

20 October 1990 Round 14	Basel	2–2	SC Zug	St. Jakob Stadium, Basel
20:00	Maissen 21' (1:0); Wagner 39' (2:0); Maissen (yellow card) 62'; Wittmann (yellow card) 84'	FCB summary	45' (2:1) Marin; (yellow card) 72' Paradiso; 87' (2:2) Müller	Attendance: 2,700; Referee: (Switzerland) Karl Strässle (Steinach and Heiden)

27 October 1990 Round 15	Winterthur	2–2	Basel	Schützenwiese, Winterthur
20:00	Ramsauer 11' (1:0); Bacchini 50' (2:1)	FCB summary	26' (1:1) Bertelsen; (yellow card) 45' Gottardi; (yellow card) 49' Bernauer; 55' (2:2) Bertelsen	Attendance: 1,700; Referee: (Switzerland) Pierre-Alain Eschmann (Moutier)

4 November 1990 Round 16	Basel	1–3	Baden	St. Jakob Stadium, Basel
14:30	Dittus 63' (pen. 1:3)	FCB summary	1' (o.g. 0:1) (Bernauer); 23' (0:2) Sitek; (yellow card) 29' [[Karl-Heinz Born|Born]] (yellow card) 40' Sitek; 48' (0:3) Wagner; (yellow card) 51' Wagner	Attendance: 2,600; Referee: (Switzerland) Serge Muhmenthaler (Grenchen)

11 November 1990 Round 17	Emmenbrücke	0–3	Basel	Stadion Gersag, Emmenbrücke
14:30	C. Wyss (yellow card) 51'; H. Siegrist (yellow card) 79'	FCB summary	24' (0:1) Wagner; (yellow card) 53' Heidenreich; 66' (0:2) Baumgartner; (yellow card) 71' Gottardi; 74' (0:3) Wagner	Attendance: 600; Referee: (Switzerland) Gottlieb Barmettler (Luzern)

18 November 1990 Round 18	Chiasso	2–2	Basel	Stadio Comunale (Chiasso)
14:30	Dario 5' (1:0); Da Silva (yellow card) 43'; Minelli (yellow card) 64'; Bernaschina 80' (pen. 2:2)	FCB summary	(yellow card) 35' Bernauer; 43' (1:1) Zbinden; 48' (1:2) Heidenreich	Attendance: 700; Referee: (Switzerland) Erwin Schuler

25 November 1990 Round 19	Basel	2–1	Bellinzona	St. Jakob Stadium, Basel
14:30	Baumgartner 31' (1:0); Đurđević (yellow card) 69'; Gottardi 86' (2:1)	FCB summary	(yellow card) 33' Rindlisbacher; 44' (1:1) Rindlisbacher; (yellow card) 48' Schär; (yellow card) 78' Pestoni	Attendance: 3,500; Referee: (Switzerland) Kurt Röthlisberger (Suhr, Aargau)

2 December 1990 Round 20	Basel	3–0	Glarus	St. Jakob Stadium, Basel
14:30	Wagner 5' (1:0); Bertelsen 26' (2:0); Wagner 43' (3:0); Ceccaroni (yellow card) 60'; Gottardi (yellow card) 75'	FCB summary	(yellow card) 41' April; (yellow card) 67' Oswald; (yellow card) 71' Stoob; (yellow card) 83' Gänssler	Attendance: 1,756; Referee: (Switzerland) Urs Meier (Wettingen and Würenlos)

9 December 1990 Round 21	Chur	1–1	Basel	Ringstrasse, Chur
14:30	De Gani 78' (1:1)	FCB summary	38' (0:1) Wittmann; (yellow card) 81' Maissen	Attendance: 162; Referee: (Switzerland) Francesco Bianchi (Chiasso)
Note: The entire playing field was covered in snow; conditions were essentially irregular.

16 December 1990 Round 22	Basel	6–2	Schaffhausen	St. Jakob Stadium, Basel
14:30	Bernauer 30' (1:1); Wagner 39' (2:1) (Bossi) 48' (o.g. 3:1); Bertelsen 55' (4:1); Zbinden 59' (5:1); Bertelsen 71' (6:2)	FCB summary	14' (0:1) Sternkopf; 69' (5:2) Harder	Attendance: 900; Referee: (Switzerland) Pierre-Alain Vuillemin (Geneva)
Note: Fair game, no yellow cards

==== League table ====
Pos	Team	Pld	W	D	L	GF	GA	GD	Pts	Qualification
1	Locarno	22	13	6	3	44	23	+21	32	Promotion round
2	Baden	22	13	5	4	41	19	+22	31	Promotion round
3	Schaffhausen	22	12	4	6	45	29	+16	28	Promotion round
4	Basel	22	9	8	5	40	30	+10	26	Promotion round
5	Zug	22	8	10	4	29	22	+7	26	Promotion round
6	Chiasso	22	10	5	7	43	26	+17	25	Promotion round
7	Bellinzona	22	7	6	9	34	32	+2	20	Relegation group
8	Winterthur	22	7	6	9	26	35	−9	20	Relegation group
9	Chur	22	5	7	10	20	25	−5	17	Relegation group
10	Glarus	22	4	6	12	23	58	−35	14	Relegation group
11	Emmenbrücke	22	3	7	12	18	39	−21	13	Relegation group
12	Kriens	22	4	4	14	22	47	−25	12	Relegation group

Source: rsssf.com
Rules for classification: 1) Points; 2) Goal difference; 3) Goals scored; 4) Head-to-head points; 5) Away goals scored; 6) Draw.

==== Promotion/relegation phase Group A ====
3 March 1991 Round 1	Basel	3–1	Etoile Carouge	St. Jakob Stadium, Basel
14:30	Dittus 33' (1:0); Dittus (yellow card) 52'; Wagner 68' (2:0); Zbinden 77' (3:0)	FCB summary	(yellow card) 32' Thomé; (yellow card) 53' da Silva; 85' (3:1) Castella	Attendance: 3,546; Referee: (Switzerland) Paul-Louis Christe (Lausanne)

10 March 1991 Round 2	Yverdon-Sports	2–0	Basel	Stade Municipal, Yverdon-les-Bains
14:30	Vialatte (yellow card) 27'; Castro (yellow card) 29'; Castro 50' (1:0); Dajka 71' (2:0); Bonato (yellow card) 73'	FCB summary	(yellow card) 15' Heidenreich; (yellow card) 87' Bertelsen	Attendance: 2,000; Referee: (Switzerland) Michel Zen Ruffinen

17 March 1991 Round 3	Basel	0–1	St. Gallen	St. Jakob Stadium, Basel
14:30	Zbinden (yellow card) 66'	FCB summary	(yellow card) 7' (yellow-red card) 61' Blättler; 29' (0:1) Cardozo; (yellow card) 32' Cardozo; (yellow card) 81' Rubio; (yellow card) 89' Thüler	Attendance: 8,000; Referee: (Switzerland) Freddy Philippoz (Sion)

27 March 1991 Round 4	Wettingen	1–3	Basel	Stadion Altenburg, Wettingen
20:00	Fink 20' (1:1); Andermatt (yellow card) 37'; Widmer (yellow card) 40'; Mathy (yellow card) 47'; Widmer (red card) 57'	FCB summary	16' (0:1) Bertelsen; (yellow card) 37' Heidenreich; 41' (1:2) Zbinden; (yellow card) 50' Ceccaroni; 86' (1:3) Bertelsen	Attendance: 4,200; Referee: (Switzerland) Erwin Schuler

6 April 1991 Round 5	Fribourg	2–2	Basel	Stade Universitaire, Freiburg
20:00	Bucheli 16' (pen. 1:0); Bucheli 43' (2:2); Bwalya (yellow card) 51'; Gross (yellow card) 83'	FCB summary	22' (pen. 1:1) Dittus; (yellow card) 39' Baumgartner; 42' (1:2) Reich; (yellow card) 79' Reich	Attendance: 2,040; Referee: (Switzerland) Erwin Fölmli

13 April 1991 Round 6	Basel	1–4	Baden	St. Jakob Stadium, Basel
20:00	Marcolli 37' (1:1); Zbinden (yellow card) 45'	FCB summary	23' (0:1) Wagner; 41' (1:2) Sitek; 49' (1:3) Born; 64' (1:4) Sitek; (yellow card) 90' Wagner	Attendance: 6,000; Referee: (Switzerland) Karl Strässle (Steinach and Heiden)

20 April 1991 Round 7	Chiasso	0–0	Basel	Stadio Comunale (Chiasso)
20:00		FCB summary		Attendance: 1,000; Referee: (Switzerland) Oswald Gritsch

4 May 1991 Round 8	Basel	3–0	Chiasso	St. Jakob Stadium, Basel
20:00	Bernauer (yellow card) 17'; Dittus 63' (1:0); Heidenreich 67' (2:0); Mancastroppa 73' (3:0); Rahmen (yellow card) 89'	FCB summary	(yellow card) 29' Kalbermatter; (yellow card) 87' Milton	Attendance: 3,500; Referee: (Switzerland) Michel Zen Ruffinen

11 May 1991 Round 9	Baden	1–1	Basel	Esp Stadium, Fislisbach
17:30	Lüdi (yellow card) 11'; Hedinger (yellow card) 81' (Maissen) 85' (o.g. 1:1)	FCB summary	(yellow card) 19' Zbinden; 22' (1:0) Maissen; (red card) 61' Hodel	Attendance: 2,300; Referee: (Switzerland) Paul-Louis Christe (Lausanne)
Note: Baden goalkeeper Patrick Mäder had to leave the field with an arm injury in the 81st minute; sweeper Karl-Heinz Born took his place between the posts, after all substitutions had been made. The pitch conditions in the pouring rain were (at best) barely acceptable; a cancellation or abandonment of the match would have been justifiable.

18 May 1991 Round 10	Basel	0–0	Fribourg	St. Jakob Stadium, Basel
20:00	Bernauer (yellow card) 80'; Baumgartner (yellow card) 90'	FCB summary	(yellow card) 28' Buntschu; (yellow card) 50' Bourquenoud; (yellow card) 64' Brülhart; (red card) 90+1' Buntschu	Attendance: 4,800; Referee: (Switzerland) Charles-Henri Morex (Bex)

25 May 1991 Round 11	Basel	1–2	Wettingen	St. Jakob Stadium, Basel
20:00	Mancastroppa (1:0); Bertelsen (yellow card) 69'	FCB summary	(yellow card) 43' Widmer; 71' (1:1) Heldmann; 83' (1:2) Kundert; (yellow card) 88' Heldmann	Attendance: 7,500; Referee: (Switzerland) Jean-Claude Craviolini

1 June 1991 Round 12	St. Gallen	1–0	Basel	Espenmoos, St. Gallen
17:30	Raschle 16' (pen. 1:0); Irizik (yellow card) 85'	FCB summary		Attendance: 4,200; Referee: (Switzerland) Peter Kellenberger
Note: Debut for FCB defender Olivier Bauer.

8 June 1991 Round 13	Basel	3–0	Yverdon-Sports	St. Jakob Stadium, Basel
20:00	Baumgartner (yellow card) 32'; Ceccaroni (yellow card) 48'; Rahmen 62' (1:0); Karrer 84' (2:0); Zbinden 87' (3:0)	FCB summary	(yellow card) 18' Rochat; (yellow card) 52' Castro	Attendance: 1,200; Referee: (Switzerland) Freddy Philippoz (Sion)
Note: Debut for FCB midfielder Thomas Karrer

12 June 1991 Round 14	Etoile Carouge	2–1	Basel	Stade de la Fontenette, Carouge
20:00	da Silva 6' (1:0) da Silva 56' (2:0)	FCB summary	(yellow card) 65' Heidenreich; 76' (2:1) Rahmen	Attendance: 250; Referee: (Switzerland) Willy Hänni, (Cugy)

==== League table ====
Pos	Team	Pld	W	D	L	GF	GA	GD	Pts	Qualification
1	St. Gallen	14	10	2	2	33	11	+22	22	Remain in NLA 1991–92
2	Wettingen	14	9	2	3	25	15	+10	20	Remain in NLA 1991–92
3	Chiasso	14	6	4	4	19	21	−2	16	Remain in NLB 1991–92
4	Basel	14	4	4	6	18	17	+1	12	Remain in NLB 1991–92
5	Yverdon-Sports	14	5	2	7	21	22	−1	12	Remain in NLB 1991–92
6	Fribourg	14	4	3	7	18	25	−7	11	Remain in NLB 1991–92
7	Baden	14	4	3	7	19	26	−7	11	Remain in NLB 1991–92
8	Etoile Carouge	14	4	0	10	16	32	−16	8	Remain in NLB 1991–92

Source: rsssf.com
Rules for classification: 1) Points; 2) Goal difference; 3) Goals scored; 4) Head-to-head points; 5) Away goals scored; 6) Draw.

=== Swiss Cup ===
18 August 1990 2nd principal round	FC Pratteln	4–0	Basel	In den Sandgruben, Pratteln
17:30	Ferreira (yellow card) 41'; Füri 62' (1:0); Böni (yellow card) 67'; Utvic 86' (2:0); Weng 86' (3:0); Steiner 90' (4:0)	FCB summary	(red card) 49' Bernauer; (yellow card) 83' Reich	Attendance: 1,389; Referee: (Switzerland) Walter Rudin (Birsfelden)
Note: FC Pratteln played the 1990–91 season in the 1. Liga, Group 3 (third-tier).

== See also ==
- History of FC Basel
- List of FC Basel players
- List of FC Basel seasons

== Sources ==
- Rotblau: Jahrbuch Saison 2015/2016. Publisher: FC Basel Marketing AG. ISBN 978-3-7245-2050-4
- Die ersten 125 Jahre / 2018. Publisher: Josef Zindel im Friedrich Reinhardt Verlag, Basel. ISBN 978-3-7245-2305-5
- The FCB squad 1990–91 at fcb-archiv.ch
- Switerland 1990–91 at RSSSF
