= 1989–90 Swiss Cup =

Tournament details
- Country: Switzerland
- Teams: 196

Final positions
- Champions: Grasshopper Club
- Runners-up: Neuchâtel Xamax

Tournament statistics
- Matches played: 195

The 1989–90 Swiss Cup was the 65th season of Switzerland's football cup competition organised annually by the Swiss Football Association. It began on 11 August with the first games of Round 1 and ended on Whit Monday 1990 with the final held at the former stadium Wankdorf, Bern. The winners earned a place in the first round of the Cup Winners' Cup.

== Overview ==
The competition began on the week-end 11–12–13 August 1988 with the first round and ended on Whit Monday 4 June 1990 with the final held at the former Wankdorf Stadium in Bern. The 24 clubs from the Nationalliga B were granted byes for the first round. The 12 clubs from the Nationalliga A were granted byes for the first two rounds. The winners of the cup qualified themselves for the first round of the Cup Winners' Cup in the next season.

The draw was respecting regionalities, when possible, and the lower classed team was granted home advantage. In the entire competition, the matches were played in a single knockout format. In the event of a draw after 90 minutes, the match went into extra time. In the event of a draw at the end of extra time, a penalty shoot-out was to decide which team qualified for the next round. No replays were foreseen, except in the fimal.

== Round 1 ==
In the first round a total of 160 clubs participated from the third-tier and lower. Reserve teams were not admitted to the competition.

=== Summary ===
Team 1	Score	Team 2
11 August 1989
Alle	1–4	Delémont
FC Plasselb	0–2	FC Domdidier
FC Marly	1–2	FC Châtel-St-Denis
12 August 1989
CS Italien (GE)	0–5	FC Saint-Jean (GE)
FC Chamoson	0–5	FC Aigle
Gland	1–2	Stade Nyonnais
FC Jorat-Mézières	1–2	FC Renens
US Collombey-Muraz	1–5	Monthey
FC Chalais	2–3	FC Bramois
FC Aarberg	0–1	Biel-Bienne
Azzurri Bienne	3–7 (a.e.t.)	Münsingen
FC Farvagny	1–2	Vevey Sports
FC Stade Payerne	0–1	FC Beauregard Fribourg
FC Crans	0–1	FC Echichens
FC Collex-Bossy	6–6 (a.e.t.) (3–4 p)	Grand-Lancy
FC Bure	1–2	Moutier
FC Courroux	1–3 (a.e.t.)	FC Breitenbach
FC Bursins	1–5	Echallens
Wangen bei Olten	0–2	SV Lyss
FC Konolfingen	1–4	Bümpliz
FC Herzogenbuchsee	0–1	Burgdorf
13 August 1989
ASI Audax-Friul	1–8	Colombier
FC Pully	1–11	Concordia/Folgore Lausanne
FC Hauterive	1–3	FC Le Locle
FC Donneloye	0–2	Stade Lausanne
FC Lonnay	0–3	FC Onex
FC Saint-Blaise	1–2	FC Boudry
FC Morat	2–1	Central Fribourg
Düdingen	2–3	FC Bern
FC Nendaz	5–4 (a.e.t.)	FC Fully
Meyrin	0–5	Urania Genève Sport
FC Savièse	2–4	FC Raron
FC Bôle	0–4 * awd 3–0	FC Grandson
FC Courtételle	0–1	FC Klus-Balsthal
FC Spiez	2–6	Thun
FC Länggasse (Bern)	1–0	FC Rapid Ostermundigen
FC Orpund	2–6	SC Ostermundigen
Internazionale BS	1–3	Laufen
Zofingen	0–3	Köniz
12–13 August 1989
FC Zuchwil	1–3	Lengnau
Luzerner Sportclub	0–4	Buochs
FC Brugg	1–0	FC Pratteln
FC Meggen	0–2	FC Gunzwil
FC Schwarz-Weiss Zürich	0–6	Red Star
FC Horgen	0–3	FC Einsielden
Bülach	1–3	SC Veltheim (Winterthur)
FC Embrach	3–4 (a.e.t.)	FC Altstetten (Zürich)
FC Rapperswil-Jona	1–2	Brühl
AC Sementina	0–0 (a.e.t.) (4–5 p)	FC Tresa
FC Morbio	2–0	Mendrisio
Biaschesi	0–1	FC Ascona
FC Oensingen	5–3	FC Bettlach
FC Aesch	2–1	FC Allschwil
FC Hägglingen	2–6	Kriens
SC Menzingen	3–2	FC Unterentfelden
FC Oberentfelden	1–2	FC Suhr
FC Echenbach	1–3	FC Sursee
Uster	1–7	FC Kilchberg
FC Effretikon	3–2 (a.e.t.)	FC Tössfeld (Winterthur)
FC Fehraltorf	2–1 (a.e.t.)	FC Rüti
FC Glattbrugg	2–1	FC Polizei Zürich
FC Dielsdorf	1–3	FC Küsnacht (ZH)
FC Wetzikon	1–2	Tuggen
FC Oerlikon (ZH)	0–1	FC Stäfa
USV Eschen/Mauren	1–2 (a.e.t.)	Vaduz
Gossau	3–2	Frauenfeld
Kreuzlingen	2–0	FC Altstätten (St. Gallen)
FC Weinfelden	0–1 (a.e.t.)	FC Rorschach
FC Uzwil	2–1	FC Münchwilen
FC Ligornetto	3–2	US Monte Carosso
Nordstern Basel	3–4	Solothurn
FC Münchenstein	0–3	FC Riehen
FC Hochdorf	2–3	FC Altdorf (Uri)
FC Winkeln (St.Gallen)	1–3	Herisau
FC Au	2–3	FC Rebstein
FC Adligenswil	3–6 (a.e.t.)	FC Küssnacht am Rigi
FC Würenlos	2–3 (a.e.t.)	FC Olten
FC Spreitenbach	0–0 (a.e.t.) (2–3 p)	Wohlen
Balzers	0–1	FC Landquart
FC Fislisbach	2–5	FC Muri

- The result of the match Bôle–FC Grandson was annulled and awarded as a 3–0 victory for Bôle because the player Frédéric Robin of Grandson was not qualified.

== Round 2 ==
The 24 clubs from the Nationalliga B were granted byes for the first round and joined the competition in the second round. The draw respected regionalities, when possible, and the lower classed team was granted home advantage.

=== Summary ===
Teams from the Nationalliga B against teams from the 1. Liga:

Team 1	Score	Team 2
19–20 August 1989
FC Bramois	2–6	Fribourg
FC Domdidier	1–0	ES Malley
Urania Genève Sport	2–2 (a.e.t.) (3–5 p)	Chênois
Vevey Sports	1–3	Montreux-Sports
FC Aigle	2–3	Martigny-Sports
Monthey	3–2	Yverdon-Sports
Laufen	0–5	Grenchen
Moutier	0–8	Basel
Buochs	4–3	FC Zug
FC Einsielden	3–9	Baden
SC Veltheim (Winterthur)	3–1	Emmenbrücke
Vaduz	0–2	Schaffhausen
FC Landquart	0–6	Locarno
FC Tresa/Monteggio	0–2	Chur

Teams from NLB against teams from the 2. Liga:

Team 1	Score	Team 2
19–20 August 1989
FC Onex	1–5	Bulle
Stade Lausanne	0–4	Étoile Carouge
FC Aesch	1–3	La Chaux-de-Fonds
FC Küsnacht (ZH)	1–2	FC Glarus
FC Stäfa	3–3 (a.e.t.) (3–5 p)	Winterthur
Brugg	0–1	SC Zug
FC Altstetten (Zürich)	0–9	Zürich
FC Rebstein	1–6	FC Brüttisellen
FC Uzwil	0–3	Chiasso

Teams from NLB against teams from the 3. Liga:

Team 1	Score	Team 2
19–20 August 1989
FC Oensingen	1–10	Old Boys

Teams from the 1. Liga amongst themselves:

Team 1	Score	Team 2
19–20 August 1989
FC Châtel-St-Denis	3–3 (a.e.t.) (1–4 p)	FC Renens
FC Raron	4–2	Stade Nyonnais
FC Beauregard Fribourg	1–2	Concordia/Folgore Lausanne
Colombier	6–0	FC Le Locle
SV Lyss	2–0	Delémont
Biel-Bienne	0–2	Burgdorf
Solothurn	1–0	FC Bern
Thun	2–2 (a.e.t.) (4–3 p)	FC Breitenbach
FC Münsingen	0–0 (a.e.t.) (1–0 p)	FC Riehen
Wohlen	2–3	Tuggen
Herisau	3–1	Kreuzlingen

Teams from the 1. Liga against teams from the 2. Liga:

Team 1	Score	Team 2
19–20 August 1989
Grand-Lancy	4–3	FC Boudry
FC Echichens	2–4	Echallens
SC Ostermundigen	0–5	FC Klus-Balsthal
FC Altdorf (Uri)	1–1 (a.e.t.) (2–1 p)	FC Muri
FC Olten	0–3	Kriens
FC Gunzwi	2–1	FC Sursee
Gossau	0–1	FC Rorschach
FC Morbio	1–3	FC Ascona
FC Ligornetto	0–4	Brühl

Teams from the 1. Liga against teams from the 3. Liga:

Team 1	Score	Team 2
19–20 August 1989
FC Fehraltorf	1–2	FC Kilchberg
SC Menzingen	0–5	Red Star
FC Glattbrugg	1–1 (a.e.t.) (1–2 p)	FC Suhr

Teams from the 2. Liga amongst themselves:

Team 1	Score	Team 2
19–20 August 1989
FC Nendaz	1–2	2 FC Morat
FC Bôle	1–0	FC Saint-Jean GE
Lengnau	1–1 (a.e.t.) (2–1 p)	Köniz

Teams from the 2. Liga against teams from the 3. Liga:

Team 1	Score	Team 2
19–20 August 1989
FC Länggasse (Bern)	2–2 (a.e.t.) (2–4 p)	Bümpliz
FC Küssnacht am Rigi	4–4 (a.e.t.) (8–9 p)	FC Effretikon

=== Matches ===
20 August 1989
17:00

FC Moutier	0–8	Basel
	FCB summary	24' (0:1) Maissen; 43' (0:2) Rindlisbacher; 61' (0:3) Zbinden; 65' (0:4) Wassmer; 66' (0:5) Heuting; 72' (0:6) Heuting; 77' (0:7) Dittus; 88' (0:8) Thoma

Stade de Chalière, Moutier
Attendance: 1,000
Referee: (Switzerland) Andreas Weber

20 August 1989

FC Altstetten (Zürich)	0–9	Zürich
	FCZ summary	4' (0:1) Maiano; 16' (0:2) Paradiso; 27' (0:3) Paradiso; 31' (0:4) Şahin; 55' (0:5) Şahin; 67' (0:6) Răducanu; 72' (0:7) Maiano; 76' (0:6) Maiano; 85' (0:9) Maiano

Buchlern, Altstetten
Attendance: 1,000
Referee: (Switzerland) Karl Strässle (Steinach)

== Round 3 ==
The 12 clubs from the Nationalliga A were granted byes for the first two rounds and they joined the competition in this round. These teams were seeded and cound not be drawn against each other. The draw respected regionalities, when possible, and the lower classed team was granted home advantage.

=== Summary ===
Team 1	Score	Team 2
1 September 1989
Brühl	2–6	St. Gallen
2 September 1989
Grand-Lancy	4–4 (a.e.t.) (4–5 p)	FC Raron
FC Kilchberg	1–2	Locarno
FC Bôle	3–3 (a.e.t.) (1–2 p)	Fribourg
Buochs	0–2	Red Star
Bümpliz	4–2	SV Lyss
Burgdorf	0–3	Basel
FC Domdidier	0–8	Bulle
Herisau	1–3	FC Brüttisellen
SC Veltheim (Winterthur)	0–4	FC Glarus
Concordia/Folgore Lausanne	3–3 (a.e.t.) (4–3 p)	Martigny-Sports
Monthey	3–1	Chênois
FC Morat	0–7	Servette
FC Renens	0–2	Echallens
FC Rorschach	2–1	Winterthur
Thun	1–5	La Chaux-de-Fonds
Tuggen	0–2	Chiasso
SC Zug	2–2 (a.e.t.) (3–2 p)	Old Boys
Étoile-Carouge	0–4	Xamax
FC Schaffhausen	2–1	Lugano
Baden	1–3	Wettingen
Montreux-Sports	0–2	Sion
Zürich	2–0	Chur
3 September 1989
Colombier	0–5	Lausanne-Sport
FC Effretikon	0–5	Bellinzona
Lengnau	1–4	FC Suhr
Tuggen	0–2	Chiasso
FC Klus-Balsthal	3–1	Münsingen
FC Gunzwil	0–2	Aarau
SC Kriens	1–7	Young Boys
Solothurn	2–0	FC Muri
23 September 1989
Grenchen	2–3 (a.e.t.)	Luzern
4 October 1989
FC Ascona	0–5	Grasshopper Club

=== Matches ===
2 September 1989
17:00

SC Burgdorf	0–3	Basel
Stadler (yellow card); Bill (yellow card)	FCB summary	9' (0:1) Bernauer; 54' (0:2) Zbinden; 75' (0:3) Wassmer

Neumatt, Burgdorf
Attendance: 1,100
Referee: (Switzerland) Manfred Schlup (Grenchen)

2 September 1989

FC Morat/FC Murten	0–7	Servette
	Servette summary	43' (0:1) Türkyilmaz; 53' Fargeon; 58' (0:3) Türkyilmaz; 65' (0:4) Türkyilmaz; 80' (0:5) Türkyilmaz; 82' (0:6) Fargeon; 85' (0:7) Acosta

Prehl/Pra-Pury, Murten

2 September 1989

Zürich	2–0	Chur
Scheepers (yellow card) 7'; Răducanu 50' (1:0); Răducanu 59' (2:0); Răducanu (yellow card) 71'	FCZ summary	(yellow card) 34' Grazia

Letzigrund, Zürich
Attendance: 947
Referee: (Switzerland) Marco Raveglia (San Vittore)

3 September 1989

FC Gunzwil	0–2	Aarau
	FCA summary	30' (0:1) Studer; 36' (0:2) Studer

Linden, Gunzwil
Attendance: 2,800
Referee: (Switzerland) Ludwig Zurkirchen

3 September 1989

SC Kriens	1–7	Young Boys
Balmer 36' (1:1)	YB summary	21' (0:1) Zuffi; 57' (1:2) Zuffi; 73' (1:3) Nilsson; 77' (1:4) Nilsson; 80' (1:5) Baumann; 83' (1:6) Zuffi; 87' (1:7) Zuffi

Stadion Kleinfeld, Kriens
Attendance: 1,200
Referee: (Switzerland) Francesco Bianchi (Chiasso)

4 October 1989

FC Ascona	0–5	Grasshopper Club
	RSSSF summary	2' (0:1) Egli; 59' (0:2) Wyss; 60' (0:3) Strudal; 62' (0:4) De Vicente; 70' (0:5) Halter

Stadio Comunale Ascona

== Round 4 ==
=== Summary ===
Team 1	Score	Team 2
1 April 1990
Locarno	1–2	Aarau
7 April 1990
Red Star	0–5	Wettingen
Bümpliz	0–2	Bulle
Concordia Folgore	4–4 (a.e.t.) (2–4 p)	Echallens
FC Suhr	0–1	Grasshopper Club
FC Rorschach	1–4	Chiasso
FC Raron	0–10	Lausanne-Sport
Fribourg	2–2 (a.e.t.) (6–5 p)	Sion
FC Glarus	0–3	Luzern
La Chaux-de-Fonds	1–2	Servette
Monthey	1–3	Xamax
Solothurn	1–3	Young Boys
FC Zürich	3–4	St. Gallen
8 April 1990
FC Brüttisellen	1–1 (a.e.t.) (3–5 p)	SC Zug
FC Schaffhausen	0–1	Basel
FC Klus/Balsthal	2–4	Bellinzona

=== Matches ===
1 April 1990

Locarno	1–2	Aarau
Lehtinen 18' (1:0)	FCA summary	34' (1:1) Komornicki; 80' (1:2) Komornicki

Stadio del Lido, Locarno
Attendance: 3,000
Referee: Daniel Roduit (Châteauneuf, Sion, Switzerland)

7 April 1990

FC Suhr	0–1	Grasshopper Club
	RSSSF summary	86' (0:1) Strudal

Hofstattmatten, Suhr, Aargau

7 April 1990

La Chaux-de-Fonds	1–2	Servette
Torres 15' (1:0)	Servette summary	54' (1:1) Cacciapaglia; 64' (1:2) Besnard

Stade Charrière, La Chaux-de-Fonds

7 April 1990

Solothurn	1–3	Young Boys
Banjalic 45 pen. 1:1'	YB summary	34' (0:1) Fimian; 61' (1:2) Közle; 73' (pen. 1:3) Nilsson

Stadion FC Solothurn, Solothurn
Attendance: 2,300
Referee: (Switzerland) Werner Müller (Obererlinsbach)

7 April 1990

FC Zürich	3–4	St. Gallen
Stübi (yellow card) 28'; Studer (yellow card) 43'; Müller 59' (1:3); Landolt (yellow card) 71'; Tréllez 76' (2:3); Grassi 82' (3:3)	FCZ summary	13' (0:1) Gambino; 52' (0:2) Hengartner; 57' (0:3) Gämperle; (yellow card) 71' Rubio; 86' (pen. 3:4) Hegi

Hardturm, Zürich
Attendance: 5,700
Referee: (Switzerland) Kurt Röthlisberger (Suhr)

8 April 1990
14:30

FC Schaffhausen	0–1	Basel
Engesser (yellow card) 15'; Meier (yellow card) 43'	FCB summary	(yellow card) 21' Ceccaroni; (red card) 34' Đurđević; (yellow card) 80' Bernauer; 84' (0:1) Wassmer; (yellow card) 87' Gottardi

Stadion Breite, Schaffhausen
Attendance: 2,260
Referee: (Switzerland) Bruno Galler (Kirchdorf, Bern)

== Round 5 ==
=== Summary ===
Team 1	Score	Team 2
21 April 1990
St. Gallen	3–1	Fribourg
Wettingen	1–0	Servette
Bellinzona	1–6	Luzern
FC Bulle	0–6	Basel
Lausanne-Sport	3–0	Aarau
SC Zug	4–0	Echallens
22 April 1990
Chiasso	1–2	Xamax
Young Boys	0–2	Grasshopper Club

=== Matches ===
21 April 1990
17:30

St. Gallen	3–1	Fribourg
Rubio 3' (1:0); Zamorano 61' (2:1); Gämperle 66' (3:1)	RSSSF summary	58' (1:1) Bulliard

Espenmoos, St. Gallen
Attendance: 4,000
Referee: (Switzerland) Marcel Despland (Yverdon-les-Bains)

21 April 1990

Wettingen	1–0	Servette
Löbmann 21' (1:0)	Servette summary

Stadion Altenburg, Wettingen
Attendance: 2.370
Referee: (Switzerland) Francesco Bianchi (Chiasso)

21 April 1990
20:00

Bellinzona	1–6	Luzern
Tognini 33' (1:3)	RSSSF summary	6' (0:1) Gmür; 8' (0:2) Eriksen; 39' (0:3) Nadig; 50' (1:4) Tuce; 69' (1:5) Tuce; 89' (1:6) Knup

Stadio Comunale, Bellinzona
Attendance: 2,000
Referee: (Switzerland) Karl Strässle (Steinach)

21 April 1990

Bulle	0–6	Basel
	FCB summary	45' (0:1) Moscatelli; 52' (0:2) Moscatelli; 55' (0:3) Wassmer; 61' (0:4) Rahmen; 77' (0:5) Rahmen; 87' (0:6) Maissen

Stade de Bouleyres, Bulle
Attendance: 2,000
Referee: (Germany) Ferdinand Friedrich

21 April 1990

Lausanne-Sport	3–0	Aarau
Schürmann 37' (1:0); Bregy 78' (2:0); Hartmann 88' (3:0)	FCA summary

Olympique de la Pontaise, Lausanne
Attendance: 4,500
Referee: (Switzerland) Marco Raveglia (San Vittore)

21 April 1990

SC Zug	4–0	Echallens
Bühlmann 25' (1:0) (Devolz) 32' (o.g.); Allegretti 47' (3:0); Allegretti 66' (4:0)	RSSSF summary

Herti Allmend Stadion, Zug
Attendance: 450
Referee: (Switzerland) N. N. Ullmann

22 April 1990

Chiasso	1–2	Xamax
Gugnali	RSSSF summary	8' (0:1) Chassot; 84' (1:2) Thévenaz

Stadio Comunale Riva IV, Chiasso
Attendance: 1,000
Referee: (Switzerland) Michel Zen Ruffinen

22 April 1990

Young Boys	0–2	Grasshopper Club
	YB summary	54' (0:1) Andermatt; 72' (0:2) De Vicente

Wankdorf Stadium, Bern
Attendance: 6,300
Referee: (Switzerland) Bruno Galler (Kirchdorf, Bern)

== Quarter-finals ==
=== Summary ===
Team 1	Score	Team 2
1 May 1990
Grasshopper Club	1–0	Basel
SC Zug	3–3 (a.e.t.) (2–4 p)	Lausanne-Sport
Luzern	0–0 (a.e.t.) (4–5 p)	Wettingen
Xamax	2–1	St.Gallen

=== Matches ===
1 May 1990
17:30

Grasshopper Club	1–0	Basel
Bickel 61' (1:0)	Summary	(yellow card) 43' Bernauer

Hardturm, Zürich
Attendance: 6,200
Referee: (Switzerland) Daniel Roduit

1 May 1990

SC Zug	3–3 (a.e.t.)	Lausanne-Sport
Huber 48' (1:1); Ugras 53' (2:1); Bühlmann 87' (3:3)	RSSSF summary	19' (0:1) Iskrenov; 62' (2:2) Bregy; 71' (2:3)Verlaat
Penalties
Marin (penalty scored); Ugras (penalty scored); Bühlmann (penalty missed); Flükiger (penalty missed)	2–4	(penalty scored) Bregy; (penalty scored) Aeby; (penalty scored) Fernandez; (penalty scored) Gertschen

Herti Allmend Stadion, Zug
Attendance: 1,050
Referee: (Switzerland) René Kellenberger (Herisau)

1 May 1990

Luzern	0–0 (a.e.t.)	Wettingen
	RSSSF summary
Penalties
Eriksen (penalty scored); Knup (penalty scored); Burri (penalty scored); Grétarsson (penalty scored); Tuce (penalty scored)	4–5	(penalty missed) Cina; (penalty scored) Kundert; (penalty scored) Bertelsen; (penalty scored) Jacobacci; (penalty scored) Rueda

Stadion Allmend, Luzern
Attendance: 11,000
Referee: (Switzerland) Manfred Schlup (Grenchen)

1 May 1990

Xamax	2–1	St.Gallen
Ryszard Tarasiewicz 49' (1:0); Gigon 90+2' (2:1)	RSSSF summary	(red card) 47' Fischer; 63' (1:1) Zamorano

Stade de la Maladière (1924), Neuchâtel
Attendance: 5,150
Referee: (Switzerland) Werner Müller (Obererlinsbach)

== Semi-finals ==
Team 1	Score	Team 2
22 May 1990
Luzern	1–3	Grasshopper Club
Xamax	2–1	Lausanne-Sport

=== Matches ===
22 May 1990

Luzern	1–3	Grasshopper Club
Eriksen 22' (1:1)	RSSSF summary	3' (0:1) Andermatt; 62' (1:2) Nyfeler; 90+2' Kohr

Stadion Allmend, Luzern
Attendance: 19,000
Referee: (Switzerland) Fredy Philippoz (Sion)

22 May 1990

Xamax	2–1	Lausanne-Sport
Lüthi 20' (1:0); Lüthi 74' (2:0)	RSSSF summary	90+2' (2:1) Ohrel

Stade de la Maladière (1924), Neuchâtel
Attendance: 13,200
Referee: (Switzerland) Francesco Bianchi (Chiasso)

== Final ==
=== Summary ===
Team 1	Score	Team 2
4 June 1990
Grasshopper Club	2–1	Xamax

=== Telegram ===
4 June 1990
15:00

Grasshopper Club	2–1	Xamax
Wyss 24' de Vicente 69'	Fussball-Schweiz summary	40' Gigon

Wankdorf, Bern
Attendance: 27,000
Referee: (Switzerland) Rolf Blattmann (Zeiningen)

Grasshopper Club won the cup and this was the club's 17th cup title to this date and the third in serie. Because they won the Swiss championship as well, they won the domestic double and this for the eighth time in their history.

== Sources and references ==
- Switzerland 1989/90 at RSSSF
- FCB Cup 1989/90 games at Verein "Basler Fussballarchiv"
