= 1989–90 FC Basel season =

FC Basel
1989–90 season
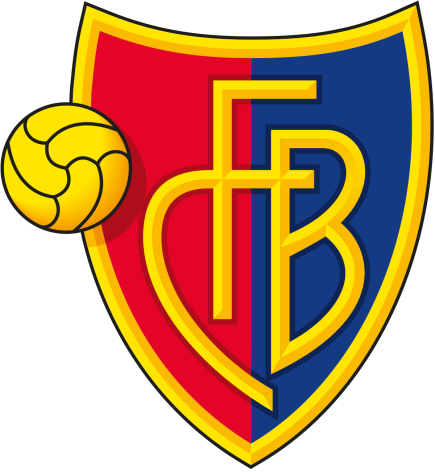
- Chairman: Charles Röthlisberger
- Manager: Urs Siegenthaler (from November 1989) Coach: Ernst August Künnecke
- Ground: St. Jakob Stadium, Basel
- Nationalliga B: Qualifying Phase West 5th of 12
- Promotion/relegation round: Promotion Phase 3rd of 8
- Swiss Cup: Quarterfinal
- Top goalscorer: League: Erni Maissen (16); All: Erni Maissen (18)
- Highest home attendance: 22,000 on 16 April 1990 vs Zürich
- Lowest home attendance: 1,900 on 4 November 1989 vs La Chaux-de-Fonds
- Average home league attendance: 6,045

The Fussball Club Basel 1893 1989–90 season was their 96th season since the club's foundation. Charles Röthlisberger was the club's chairman for the second consecutive year. FC Basel played their home games in the St. Jakob Stadium. Following their relegation in the 1987–88 season this was their second season in the second-tier of Swiss football.

== Overview ==
=== Pre-season ===
For the third consecutive season Urs Siegenthaler was first team coach. After missing promotion the season before the club's repeated priority aim was to return to the top flight of Swiss football. Due to the poor results during October Urs Siegenthaler lost his position as first team coach and in November he was replaced by Ernst August Künnecke.

As was previously noted during the off-season period over the previous few years, again this season there were many changes in the squad. Remo Brügger, who had recovered from his car accident injuries, moved on to St. Gallen. This was in a player swop with goalkeeper pendant Thomas Grüter who did not want to return there, following his six-month loan with Basel, following Brügger's accident. Michael Syfrig moved on to higher-tier Aarau and Lucio Esposito also moved on to a higher-tier club, Bellinzona. Seven other players left the squad because their contracts had not been renewed.

In the other direction Erni Maissen returned from Young Boys. Ruedi Zbinden returned to the club and Sascha Reich signed in from Bellinzona. Miodrag Đurđević was taken on contract from Dinamo Zagreb and Uwe Wassmer from Schalke 04. Further there were the signings of young local newcomers, like Manfred Wagner from FC Steinen-Höllstein, Vittorio Gottardi from SC Dornach, Jörg Heuting from Concordia Basel and René Spicher from Old Boys. Other newcomers were Olaf Berg from Viktoria Buchholz and Boris Mancastroppa from Red Star Zürich.

=== Domestic league ===
The 24 teams in the Nationalliga B were divided into two groups, an east and a west group, to first play a qualification round. In the second stage the tops six teams in each group and the last four team of the Nationalliga A would play a promotion/relegation round, also divided into two groups. The top two teams in each group would play in the top flight the next season. Basel were assigned to the West group. The Qualifying Phase started well and after ten rounds with six victories and only one defeat Basel led the group. Then however, a run of bad results, including home defeats against lower positioned teams ES Malley and Etoile Carouge and a 4–0 dubbing away against Yverdon-Sports cost head-coach Urs Siegenthaler his job. The team ended their 22 matches in the Qualifying Phase with 11 victories, five draws and six defeats with 27 points in a disappointing fifth position in the league table. The team scored just 29 goals and conceded 27. Erni Maissen was the team's top scorer in this stage with 10 goals, including a hat-trick, scored within seven minutes, during the away game against Old Boys on 22 September.

Basel qualified for the promotion stage and were assigned to group A. Also assigned into this group from the Nationalliga B were Zürich, Yverdon-Sports, Fribourg, Chur and Schaffhausen. These were joined by two teams from the Nationalliga A, Servette and Bellinzona, who were fighting against relegation. Basel started well, winning the first four matches, but could only manage draws at home against both Servette and Zürich. The return matches against these two teams both ended in defeats and thus Basel could only reach third position in the table behind these two rivals and thus missed promotion.

=== Swiss Cup ===
Basel entered into the Swiss Cup in the 2nd principal round. Here they were drawn away against lower-tier FC Moutier. The game was won convincingly 8–0 with seven different goal scorers. In the third round they were drawn against lower-tier SC Burgdorf and this won easily (3–0) as well. In the round of 32 they were drawn away against Schaffhausen. Despite an early red card for Miodrag Đurđević, the match ended with a 1–0 victory. In the next round Basel had an away game against Bulle and mastered this with a 6–0 victory. Basel advanced through the first four rounds without conceding a single goal and had scored 18, with 11 different goal scorers. However, in the quarterfinals Basels cup season came to an end after a 0–1 defeat away from home in the Hardturm Stadium against higher-tier Grasshopper Club. The Grasshoppers went on to win the trophy, for the third season in a row, beating Xamax 2–1 in the final. In fact the Grasshoppers achieved the national double that season.

== Players ==
Note: Flags indicate national team as defined under FIFA eligibility rules; some limited exceptions apply. Players may hold more than one non-FIFA nationality.

No.	Pos.	Nation	Player
1	GK	SUI	Thomas Grüter
2	DF	SUI	Massimo Ceccaroni
3	MF	SUI	Sascha Reich (from Bellinzona)
4	DF	YUG	Miodrag Đurđević (from Dinamo Zagreb)
5	MF	GER	Uwe Dittus
6	FW	GER	Manfred Wagner (from FC Steinen-Höllstein)
7	MF	ITA	Vittorio Gottardi (from SC Dornach)
8	MF	ESP	Enrique Mata
9	FW	GER	Uwe Wassmer (from Schalke 04)
10	MF	SUI	Erni Maissen (from Young Boys)
11	FW	SUI	Ruedi Zbinden (from Bellinzona)
12	FW	SUI	Ralph Thoma
14	MF	SUI	Mario Moscatelli

No.	Pos.	Nation	Player
15	MF	SUI	Andre Rindlisbacher
16	FW	SUI	Patrick Rahmen
18	FW	GER	Jörg Heuting (from Concordia Basel)
—	GK	SUI	Roger Glanzmann
—	DF	GER	Peter Bernauer
—	DF	SUI	Markus Hodel
—	DF	SUI	Patrick Liniger (reserves)
—	MF	SUI	René Spicher (from Old Boys)
—	MF	SUI	Beat Aebi
—	MF	GER	Rolf Baumann
—	MF	GER	Olaf Berg (from Viktoria Buchholz)
—	MF	ITA	Boris Mancastroppa (from Red Star Zürich)
—	FW	ITA	Germano Fanciulli

Players who left the squad

Note: Flags indicate national team as defined under FIFA eligibility rules; some limited exceptions apply. Players may hold more than one non-FIFA nationality.

No.	Pos.	Nation	Player
—	GK	SUI	Remo Brügger (to St. Gallen)
—	DF	SUI	Markus Füri
—	DF	SUI	Bruno Hänni
—	DF	SUI	Kurt Spirig
—	DF	SUI	Michael Syfrig (to Aarau)

No.	Pos.	Nation	Player
—	MF	SUI	Andre Cueni
—	FW	ITA	Lucio Esposito (to Bellinzona)
—	FW	SUI	Markus Selg
—	FW	SUI	Stephan Schaub
—	FW	SUI	Remo Steiner

== Results ==
Legend

Win Draw Loss Postponed

=== Friendly matches ===
==== Pre-season ====
2 July 1989 Pre-season	Team Neckartenzlingen (Germany)	0–10	(Switzerland) Basel	Sports Field Neckartenzlingen
		FCB summary	Rahmen (3x); Heuting (3x); Moscatelli (2x); Wagner (1x); Bernauer (1x)

8 July 1989 Exhibition game	Freiburger FC (Germany)	2–4	(Switzerland) Basel	Jahn-Stadion, Titisee-Neustadt
17:00	Guillou 55' (1:2); Guillou (penalty missed) 64′ Fritz 68' (2:3)	FCB summary	23' (0:1) Wassmer; 43' (pen. 0:2) Dittus; 60' (1:3) Dittus; 89' (2:4) Wagner	Attendance: 300; Referee: (Germany) Gernot Pfefferle
Note: 67th minute, Thomas Grüter held the foul penalty from Guillou.

13 July 1989 Uhrencup semi-final	Basel (Switzerland)	1–1 (0–3 p)	(Socialist Federal Republic of Yugoslavia) Partizan	Stadion Brühl, Grenchen
19:00	Wagner (yellow card) 47'; Dittus (yellow card) 50'; Maissen 63' (1:1)	FCB summary	11' (0:1) Pantić; (yellow card) 43' Spasić; (yellow card) 65' Petrić	Attendance: 1,300; Referee: (Switzerland) Francis Fischer (Arch)
	Penalties
	Wassmer (penalty missed); Fanciulli (penalty missed); Berg (penalty missed)		(penalty scored) Bajović; (penalty scored) Petrić; (penalty scored) Stanojković
Note: The Uhrencup is a former club football tournament that was held annually in Grenchen in Switzerland.

15 July 1989 Uhrencup match for 3rd place	Basel (Switzerland)	2–0	(Switzerland) Zürich	Stadion Brühl, Grenchen
17:00	Moscatelli 26' (1:0); Maissen 44' (2:0); Dittus (yellow card) 53'; Hodel (yellow card) 63'; Berg (yellow card) 77'	FCZ summary FCB summary	(yellow card) 18' Studer; (yellow card) 28' (yellow-red card) 53' Şahin; (yellow card) 90' Scheepers	Attendance: 1,600; Referee: (Switzerland) Willi Rudin (Liestal and Birsfelden)
Note: The Uhrencup is a former club football tournament that was held annually in Grenchen in Switzerland.

18 July 1989 Exhibition game	Basel (Switzerland)	2–1	(Czech Republic) Dukla Prague	Sternenfeld, Birsfelden
19:30	Thoma 14' (1:0); Maissen 47' (2:0); Dittus (yellow card)	FCB summary	78' (2:1) Karoch; (yellow card) Korejcic; (yellow card) Chlad	Attendance: 800; Referee: (Switzerland) André Reck

==== Winter break and mid-season ====
21 January 1990 Winter break	FC Pratteln (Switzerland)	1–4	(Switzerland) Basel	In den Sandgruben, Pratteln
14:30	Bielser 3' (1:0)	FCB summary	65' (1:1) Ceccaroni; 68' (1:2) Thoma; 69' (1:3) Maissen; 85' (1:4) Maissen	Attendance: 700; Referee: (Switzerland) Aldo Palama

28 January 1990 Exhibition game	SC Freiburg (Germany)	2–0	(Switzerland) Basel	Dreisamstadion, Freiburg, Germany
14:30	Trieb 12' (1:0); Majka 18' (2:0)	FCB summary		Attendance: 500; Referee: (Germany) Norbert Stocker

31 January 1990 Exhibition game	Basel (Switzerland)	2–2	(Switzerland) Grasshopper Club	Basel
	Moscatelli; Moscatelli	FCB summary	Goal	Attendance: 364

4 February 1990 Exhibition game	Basel (Switzerland)	3–1	(Switzerland) FC Brüttisellen	Sternenfeld, Birsfelden
14:30	Maissen 7' (1:0); Moscatelli 57' (2:0); Dittus (penalty missed) 76′ Dittus 76' (3:0)	FCB summary	80' (3:1) Hinder; (yellow card) Marchioni; (yellow card) Wehrli	Attendance: 400; Referee: (Switzerland) Peter Bochsler (Basel)
Note: 76th minute, Brüttisellen's goalkeeper Peter Meier saved Uwe Dittus's penalty-kick, but had no chance against his follow-up shot.

6 February 1990 Exhibition game	Basel (Switzerland)	4–0	(Switzerland) Nordstern Basel	Tannenbrunn, Sissach
18:30	Maissen 29' (1:0); Thoma 36' (2:0); Wagner 45' (3:0); Gottardi 62' (4:0)	FCB summary		Attendance: 150; Referee: (Switzerland) Rolf Blattmann (Zeiningen)

8 February 1990 Exhibition game	FC Riehen (Switzerland)	3–2	(Switzerland) Basel	Grendelmatte, Riehen
19:30	Stefano Ceccaroni 10' (1:0); Stefano Ceccaroni 29' (pen. 2:0); Keller 46' (3:1); Guidantoni (yellow card) 73'	FCB summary	33' (2:1) Thoma; 71' (3:2) Wassmer	Attendance: 200; Referee: (Switzerland) Andreas Schluchter (Schönenbuch)
Note: Match time 2 x 40 minutes

10 February 1990 Exhibition game	Freiburger FC (Germany)	0–2	(Switzerland) Basel	Möslestadion, Freiburg
14:30		FCB summary	38' (0:1) Rahmen; 56' (0:2) Dittus; (yellow card) 73' Đurđević	Attendance: 300; Referee: (Germany) Hans-Jürgen Ortlieb

18 February 1990 Winter break	Basel (Switzerland)	0–0	(Switzerland) Luzern	St. Jakob Stadium, Basel
14:30		FCB summary	(yellow card) 53' Grétarsson	Attendance: 1,300; Referee: (Switzerland) Willi Rudin (Liestal and Birsfelden)

4 April 1990 Mid-season	Basel (Switzerland)	3–2	(Switzerland) Wettingen	Margelacker, Muttenz
18:00	Maissen 27' (1:0); Zbinden 60' (pen. 2:2); Wassmer 72' (3:2)	FCB summary	43' (1:1) Rueda; 45' (1:2) Corneliusson	Attendance: 460; Referee: (Switzerland) Willi Rudin (Liestal and Birsfelden)

=== Nationalliga B ===
==== Qualifying Phase West ====
22 July 1989 Round 1	Basel	2–0	Old Boys	St. Jakob Stadium, Basel
17:30	Dittus (yellow card) 59'; Moscatelli 73' (1:0); Mancastroppa 87' (2:0); Fanciulli (yellow card) 88'	FCB summary	(yellow card) 27' Kägi; (yellow card) 50' van Oostrum	Attendance: 6,500; Referee: (Switzerland) Michel Zen Ruffinen

26 July 1989 Round 2	ES Malley	0–3	Basel	Stade du Bois Gentil, Malley
19:00		FCB summary	43' (0:1) Wassmer; 85' (0:2) Wassmer; 89' (0:3) Moscatelli	Attendance: 900; Referee: (Switzerland) Karl Strässle (Steinach and Heiden)
Note: Fair game, no yellow cards.

29 July 1989 Round 3	Basel	2–4	Fribourg	St. Jakob Stadium, Basel
17:30	Dittus 34' (pen. 1:1); Moscatelli 35' (2:1)	FCB summary	17' (0:1) Bücheli; (yellow card) 43' Frederiksen; 43' (2:2) Rojević; 70' (pen. 2:3) Kreis; 77' (2:4) Kreis; (yellow card) 88' Troiani	Attendance: 3,100; Referee: (Switzerland) Marino Paggiola (Appenzell)

4 August 1989 Round 4	Montreux-Sports	2–2	Basel	Stade de Chailly, Montreux
20:00	Nil 80' (1:1); Léger 86' (pen. 2:1)	FCB summary	63' (0:1) Moscatelli; 90' (2:2) Wassmer; (yellow card) Zbinden; (yellow card) Moscatelli	Attendance: 1,100; Referee: (Switzerland) Jean-Claude Tagliabue

9 August 1989 Round 5	Basel	1–1	Yverdon-Sports	St. Jakob Stadium, Basel
20:00	Hodel (yellow card) 27'; Zbinden 55' (1:0)	FCB summary	(yellow card) 17' Schertenleib; 68' (1:1) Vialatte	Attendance: 3,200; Referee: (Switzerland) Pierre-Alain Vuillemin (Geneva)

12 August 1989 Round 6	La Chaux-de-Fonds	0–4	Basel	Stade Charrière, La Chaux-de-Fonds
17:30	Bridge (yellow card) 45'	FCB summary	17' (0:1) Maissen; 29' (0:2) Reich; 36' (0:3) Maissen; (yellow card) 37' Zbinden; 64' (0:4) Wassmer; (yellow card) 85' Moscatelli	Attendance: 1,100; Referee: (Switzerland) Bruno Klötzli (Bévilard)

15 August 1989 Round 7	Basel	3–2	Bulle	St. Jakob Stadium, Basel
20:00	Maissen 42' (1:2); Dittus 70' (pen. 2:2); Wassmer 84' (3:2); Moscatelli (yellow card) 84'	FCB summary	12' (0:1) Duc; 13' (0:2) Duc; (yellow card) 14' Zurkinden; (yellow card) 63' Duc	Attendance: 3,600; Referee: (Switzerland) Francis Fischer (Arch)

23 August 1989 Round 8	Chênois	2–2	Basel	Stade des Trois-Chêne, Thônex
20:00	Esterházy 4' (1:0); Kressibucher (yellow card) 63'; Michel (yellow card) 81'; Esterházy 90+1' (pen. 2:2)	FCB summary	37' (1:1) Maissen; (yellow card) 47' Rindlisbacher; 58' (1:2) Spicher; (yellow card) 63' Wassmer; (yellow card) 71' Dittus	Attendance: 1,700; Referee: (Switzerland) Erwin Fölmli

26 August 1989 Round 9	Basel	2–0	Martigny-Sports	St. Jakob Stadium, Basel
17:30	Bernauer (yellow card) 31'; Zbinden 70' (1:0); Maissen 86' (2:0)	FCB summary	(yellow card) 36' Bruchez	Attendance: 2,800; Referee: (Switzerland) Michel Barbezat

9 September 1989 Round 10	Basel	2–0	Grenchen	St. Jakob Stadium, Basel
17:30	Zbinden (yellow card) 56'; Dittus 60' (1:0); Dittus (yellow card) 84'; Moscatelli 87' (2:0)	FCB summary	(yellow card) 40' Taddei; (yellow card) 88' Daumüller	Attendance: 3,500; Referee: (Switzerland) Ludwig Zurkirchen

15 September 1989 Round 11	Etoile Carouge	5–2	Basel	Stade des Trois-Chêne, Thônex
20:00	Tóth 18' (1:0); Constantino 45' (2:0); Castella 65' (3:2); Castella 86' (pen. 4:2); Castella 89' (pen. 5:2)	FCB summary	(yellow card) 34' Zbinden; 50' (2:1) Zbinden; 55' (2:2) Moscatelli; (yellow card) 66' Moscatelli; (yellow card) 70' Hodel; (yellow card) 77' Thoma	Attendance: 700; Referee: (Switzerland) Erwin Schuler

22 September 1989 Round 12	Old Boys	1–5	Basel	Stadion Schützenmatte, Basel
20:00	Verveer (yellow card) 42'; Verveer 56' (1:4)	FCB summary	13' (0:1) Maissen; 16' (0:2) Maissen; 20' (0:3) Maissen; (yellow card) 23' Zbinden; 27' (0:4) Dittus; 67' (1:5) Wagner	Attendance: 3,300; Referee: (Switzerland) Stefan Kohli

30 September 1989 Round 13	Basel	0–3	ES Malley	St. Jakob Stadium, Basel
17:30	Baumann (yellow card) 76'	FCB summary	5' (0:1) Dietlin; 16' (0:2) Tornare; (yellow card) 27' Moser; (yellow card) 63' Gendron; 68' (pen. 0:3) Moser	Attendance: 2,400; Referee: (Switzerland) Michel Zen Ruffinen

7 October 1989 Round 14	Fribourg	0–3	Basel	Stade Universitaire, Freiburg
20:00	Troiani (yellow card) 74'	FCB summary	(yellow card) 26' Reich; 35' (0:1) Zbinden; (yellow card) 55' Maissen; (yellow card) 57' Dittus; 61' (2:0) Maissen; 73' (0:3) Moscatelli	Attendance: 1,581; Referee: (Switzerland) Erwin Fölmli

14 October 1989 Round 15	Basel	1–1	Montreux-Sports	St. Jakob Stadium, Basel
17:30	Wassmer 90' (1:1)	FCB summary	(yellow card) 8' Nil; 68' (0:1) Fesselet	Attendance: 2,300; Referee: (Switzerland) Pierre-Alain Vuillemin (Geneva)

21 October 1989 Round 16	Basel	0–1	Etoile Carouge	St. Jakob Stadium, Basel
17:30	Bernauer (yellow card) 18'	FCB summary	(yellow card) 26' Tomas; 35' (0:1) Besnard; (yellow card) 59' Constantín; (yellow card) 86' Besnard	Attendance: 2,200; Referee: (Switzerland) Charles-Henri Morex (Bex)

28 October 1989 Round 17	Yverdon-Sports	4–0	Basel	Stade Municipal, Yverdon-les-Bains
17:30	Allen 6' (1:0); Béguin 15' (2:0); Béguin 38' (3:0); Béguin 58' (4:0); Bonato (yellow card)	FCB summary	(yellow card) Zbinden; (yellow card) Bernauer	Attendance: 2,000; Referee: (Switzerland) Georges Sandoz (Corcelles-Cormondrèche, Neuchâtel)z

4 November 1989 Round 18	Basel	2–0	La Chaux-de-Fonds	St. Jakob Stadium, Basel
17:30	Reich (yellow card) 20'; Maissen 40' (1:0); Zbinden 45' (2:0)	FCB summary	(yellow card) 17' Guede; (yellow card) 18' Naef; (yellow card) 90' Pavoni	Attendance: 1,900; Referee: (Switzerland) Charles Hänni

12 November 1989 Round 19	Bulle	2–0	Basel	Stade de Bouleyres, Bulle
14:30	Bodonyi 4' (1:0); Duc (yellow card) 34'; Kunz (yellow card) 66'; Lagger (yellow card) 79'; Kunz 87' (2:0)	FCB summary	(yellow card) 36' Rindlisbacher; (yellow card) 76' Moscatelli	Attendance: 1,500; Referee: (Switzerland) Arturo Martino (Neukirch an der Thur)

18 November 1989 Round 20	Basel	2–0	Chênois	St. Jakob Stadium, Basel
17:30	Rahmen 8' (1:0); Mata 59' (2:0)	FCB summary	(yellow card) 49' Grange	Attendance: 2,100; Referee: (Switzerland) Jean-Claude Craviolini

26 November 1989 Round 21	Martigny-Sports	1–1	Basel	Stade d'Octodure, Martigny
14:30	Praz 20' (1:0); Schule (yellow card) 30'; J. Grand (yellow card) 38'	FCB summary	(yellow card) 57' Gottardi; 89' (1:1) Moscatelli	Attendance: 300; Referee: (Switzerland) Andreas Weber (Bern)

3 December 1989 Round 22	Grenchen	0–1	Basel	Stadion Brühl, Grenchen
14:30		FCB summary	17' (pen. 0:1) Dittus; (yellow card) 42' Reich; (yellow card) 50' Dittus; (yellow card) 75' Bernauer	Attendance: 1,150; Referee: (Switzerland) Werner Müller (Obererlinsbach)

==== League table ====
Pos	Team	Pld	W	D	L	GF	GA	GD	Pts	Qualification
1	Fribourg	22	13	5	4	43	38	+5	31	Promotion round
2	Bulle	22	12	6	4	46	23	+23	30	Promotion round
3	Yverdon-Sports	22	10	8	4	39	21	+18	28	Promotion round
4	CS Chênois	22	10	7	5	38	24	+14	27	Promotion round
5	Basel	22	11	5	6	40	29	+11	27	Promotion round
6	Grenchen	22	8	9	5	38	21	+17	25	Promotion round
7	Etoile-Carouge FC	22	9	4	9	35	35	0	22	Relegation round
8	La Chaux-de-Fonds	22	8	3	11	41	37	+4	19	Relegation round
9	Montreux-Sports	22	5	8	9	27	38	−11	18	Relegation round
10	Old Boys Basel	22	5	6	11	27	40	−13	16	Relegation round
11	ES Malley	22	3	5	14	18	53	−35	11	Relegation round
12	Martigny-Sports	22	1	8	13	26	59	−33	10	Relegation round

Source: RSSSF
Rules for classification: 1) Points; 2) Goal difference; 3) Goals scored; 4) Head-to-head points; 5) Away goals scored; 6) Draw.

==== Promotion/relegation Phase, Group A ====
25 February 1990 Round 1	Basel	1–0	Chur	St. Jakob Stadium, Basel
14:30	Maissen 70' (1:0)	FCB summary	(yellow card) 68' Ladislav JurkemikJurkemik	Attendance: 3,600; Referee: (Switzerland) Daniel Roduit (Sion)

3 March 1990 Round 2	Fribourg	0–1	Basel	Stade Universitaire, Freiburg
14:30	Rojevic (yellow card) 14'	FCB summary	(yellow card) 12' Reich; 17' (0:1) Wassmer; (red card) 24' Bernauer	Attendance: 2,222; Referee: (Switzerland) Marco Raveglia (San Vittore)
Note: 90th minute, goal from Pietro Troiani was disallowed due to a prior foul on FCB keeper Urs Grüter.

11 March 1990 Round 3	Basel	3–1	Schaffhausen	St. Jakob Stadium, Basel
14:30	Thoma 40' (1:0); Đurđević (yellow card) 47'; Wassmer 69' (2:1); Maissen 75' (3:1)	FCB summary	(yellow card) 35' Engesser; (yellow card) 44' Graf; 48' (pen. 1:1) Engesser	Attendance: 5,000; Referee: (Switzerland) Gottfried Friedrich (Seedorf, Uri)
Note: Nationalliga B debut for Liniger

18 March 1990 Round 4	Bellinzona	1–4	Basel	Stadio Comunale Bellinzona, Bellinzona
14:30	Manetsch (yellow card) 39'; Perez 59' (pen. 1:2); De Lusi (yellow card) 68'	FCB summary	18' (0:1) Maissen; (yellow card) 37' Moscatelli; 41' (0:2) Mata; (yellow card) 46' Thoma; 67' (1:3) Maissen; 89' (1:4) Wassmer	Attendance: 2,500; Referee: (Switzerland) Freddy Philippoz (Sion)

25 March 1990 Round 5	Basel	1–1	Servette	St. Jakob Stadium, Basel
14:30	Arne StielStiel (yellow card) 25'; Favre 71' (1:0)	FCB summary	(yellow card) 31' Maissen; 90' (1:1) Rahmen	Attendance: 16,000; Referee: (Switzerland) Francesco Bianchi (Chiasso)

11 April 1990 Round 6	Yverdon-Sports	1–1	Basel	Stade Municipal, Yverdon-les-Bains
20:00	Isabella 32' (1:0)	FCB summary	54' (1:1) Wassmer	Attendance: 3,100; Referee: (Switzerland) Karl Strässle (Steinach and Heiden)

16 April 1990 Round 7	Basel	3–3	Zürich	St. Jakob Stadium, Basel
14:30	Maiano (yellow card) 13' (Dittus) 18' (o.g. 1:0); Scheepers (yellow card) 29'; Tréllez 45+1' (2:0); Makalakalane (yellow card) 57'; Tréllez 72' (3:1)	FCZ summary FCB summary	66' (pen. 2:1) Dittus; 78' (3:2) Wassmer; (yellow card) 87' Moscatelli; 90+1' (3:3) Dittus	Attendance: 22,000; Referee: (Switzerland) Charles-Henri Morex (Bex)

24 April 1990 Round 8	Zürich	3–1	Basel	Letzigrund, Zürich
20:00	Kok 24' (1:0); Müller 25' (2:0); Tréllez 70' (3:0)	FCZ summary FCB summary	(yellow card) 27' Dittus; (yellow card) 60' Reich; (yellow card) 64' Rindlisbacher; 77' (pen. 3:1) Dittus	Attendance: 15,800; Referee: (Switzerland) Arturo Martino (Neukirch an der Thur)
Note: NZZ, April 26, 1990: "For the second time since the start of the game [after 2:0], the Basel fans had behaved badly by throwing bananas and bottles at August Makalakalane, one of the very best and also fairest players on the field."

28 April 1990 Round 9	Basel	1–1	Yverdon-Sports	St. Jakob Stadium, Basel
17:30	Moscatelli (yellow card) 21'; Đurđević (yellow card) 43'; Gottardi (yellow card) 71'; Đurđević 90' (1:1)	FCB summary	(yellow card) 21' Vialatte; (yellow card) 29' Bozzi; 53' (pen. 0:1) Nagy; (yellow card) 75' Châtelan	Attendance: 7,200; Referee: (Switzerland) Freddy Philippoz (Sion)

5 May 1990 Round 10	Servette	3–1	Basel	Charmilles Stadium, Geneva
20:00	Fargeon 13' (1:0); Türkyilmaz 29' (2:0); Sinval 78' (3:1)	FCB summary	62' (2:1) Dittus; (yellow card) 71' Zbinden; (yellow card) 80' Đurđević	Attendance: 8,200; Referee: (Switzerland) Francesco Bianchi (Chiasso)

12 May 1990 Round 11	Basel	4–1	Bellinzona	St. Jakob Stadium, Basel
17:30	Rahmen 2' (1:0); Wassmer 21' (2:0); Rahmen 41' (3:1); Rahmen (yellow card) 42'; Mata 75' (4:1)	FCB summary	27' (2:1) Mapuata; (yellow card) 35' Germann; (yellow card) 45' Krdžević	Attendance: 8,700; Referee: (Switzerland) Arturo Martino (Neukirch an der Thur)

19 May 1990 Round 12	Schaffhausen	0–5	Basel	Stadion Breite, Schaffhausen
20:00	von Niederhäusern (yellow card) 13'	FCB summary	8' (0:1) Zbinden; (yellow card) 14' Gottardi; 23' (0:2) Zbinden; 46' (0:3) Mata; 63' (0:4) Maissen; 87' (0:5) Maissen	Attendance: 1,980; Referee: (Switzerland) Werner Müller (Obererlinsbach)

26 May 1990 Round 13	Basel	1–1	Fribourg	St. Jakob Stadium, Basel
20:00	Rahmen 90' (1:1)	FCB summary	(yellow card) 42' Bourquenoud; (yellow card) 57' Rotzetter; 80' (0:1) Bucheli	Attendance: 12,500; Referee: (Switzerland) Freddy Philippoz (Sion)

30 May 1990 Round 14	Chur	1–0	Basel	Ringstrasse, Chur
20:00	P. Sidler (yellow card) 12'; Manetsch 65' (1:0); Reinwald (yellow card) 70'	FCB summary	(yellow card) 34' Đurđević; (yellow card) 45' Zbinden	Attendance: 2,150; Referee: (Switzerland) Marco Raveglia (San Vittore)

==== Final group table ====
Pos	Team	Pld	W	D	L	GF	GA	GD	Pts	Qualification
1	Servette	14	8	4	2	29	13	+16	20	Remain in Nationalliga A 1990–91
2	Zürich	14	8	4	2	30	17	+13	20	Promoted to Nationalliga A 1990–91
3	Basel	14	6	5	3	27	17	+10	17	Remain in NLB 1990–91
4	Bellinzona	14	5	5	4	19	16	+3	15	Relegated to NLB 1990–91
5	Yverdon-Sports	14	3	7	4	14	16	−2	13	Remain in NLB 1990–91
6	Fribourg	14	4	3	7	17	27	−10	11	Remain in NLB 1990–91
7	Chur	14	3	3	8	9	21	−12	9	Remain in NLB 1990–91
8	Schaffhausen	14	2	3	9	15	33	−18	7	Remain in NLB 1990–91

Source: RSSSF
Rules for classification: 1) Points; 2) Goal difference; 3) Goals scored; 4) Head-to-head points; 5) Away goals scored; 6) Draw.

=== Swiss Cup ===
20 August 1989 Round 2	FC Moutier	0–8	Basel	Stade de Chalière, Moutier
17:00		FCB summary	24' (0:1) Maissen; 43' (0:2) Rindlisbacher; 61' (0:3) Zbinden; 65' (0:4) Wassmer; 66' (0:5) Heuting; 72' (0:6) Heuting; 77' (0:7) Dittus; 88' (0:8) Thoma	Attendance: 1,000; Referee: (Switzerland) Andreas Weber
Note: FC Moutier played the 1989–90 season in the 1. Liga (third-tier).

2 September 1989 Round 3	SC Burgdorf	0–3	Basel	Neumatt, Burgdorf
17:00	Stadler (yellow card); Bill (yellow card)	FCB summary	9' (0:1) Bernauer; 54' (0:2) Zbinden; 75' (0:3) Wassmer	Attendance: 1,100; Referee: (Switzerland) Manfred Schlup (Grenchen)

8 April 1990 Round 4	FC Schaffhausen	0–1	Basel	Stadion Breite, Schaffhausen
14:30	Engesser (yellow card) 15'; Meier (yellow card) 43'	FCB summary	(yellow card) 21' Ceccaroni; (red card) 34' Đurđević; (yellow card) 80' Bernauer; 84' (0:1) Wassmer; (yellow card) 87' Gottardi	Attendance: 2,260; Referee: (Switzerland) Bruno Galler (Kirchdorf, Bern)

21 April 1990 Round 5	Bulle	0–6	Basel	Stade de Bouleyres, Bulle
20:00		FCB summary	45' (0:1) Moscatelli; 52' (0:2) Moscatelli; 55' (0:3) Wassmer; 61' (0:4) Rahmen; 77' (0:5) Rahmen; 87' (0:6) Maissen	Attendance: 2,000; Referee: (Germany) Ferdinand Friedrich
Note: Fair game, no yellow cards.

1 May 1990 Quarterfinal	Grasshopper Club	1–0	Basel	Hardturm, Zürich
17:30	Bickel 61' (1:0)	Summary	(yellow card) 43' Bernauer	Attendance: 6,200; Referee: (Switzerland) Daniel Roduit (Sion)

== See also ==
- History of FC Basel
- List of FC Basel players
- List of FC Basel seasons

== Sources ==
- Rotblau: Jahrbuch Saison 2015/2016. Publisher: FC Basel Marketing AG. ISBN 978-3-7245-2050-4
- Die ersten 125 Jahre. Publisher: Josef Zindel im Friedrich Reinhardt Verlag, Basel. ISBN 978-3-7245-2305-5
- The FCB squad 1989–90 at fcb-archiv.ch
- 1989–90 at RSSSF
