= Andreas Steiner =

Andreas Steiner may refer to:

- Andreas Steiner (athlete) (born 1964), Austrian athlete
- Andreas Steiner (footballer) (born 1971), Swiss footballer
