= Roman Hangarter =

Swiss footballer (born 1967)

Personal information
- Full name: Roman Hangarter
- Date of birth: 16 August 1967 (age 59)
- Place of birth: Switzerland
- Height: 1.87 m (6 ft 2 in)
- Positions: Midfielder; striker

Team information
- Current team: Grasshopper Club Zürich (Academy Manager)

Senior career*
Years	Team	Apps	(Gls)
1986–1988	FC Brüttisellen		
1988–1989	FC St. Gallen		
1989–1990	Grasshopper Club Zürich	4	(0)
1990	FC Brüttisellen	10	(1)
1990–1991	FC Basel	4	(0)
1991–1992	FC Brüttisellen	40	(1)
1992–1993	FC Chur	18	(3)
1993	FC Brüttisellen	10	(0)
1993–1994	FC Chiasso	19	(2)
1994–1996	AC Bellinzona		
1996–1997	FC Gossau	28	(1)
- * Club domestic league appearances and goals

Roman Hangarter (born 16 August 1967) is a Swiss retired footballer who played in the 1980s and 1990s. He played mainly in the position as striker, but also as midfielder.

== Playing career ==
Hangarter played his youth football with local club FC Brüttisellen and advanced to their first team in 1986. He played in their first team for two seasons. Hangarter signed his first professional contract during the summer break 1988 with St. Gallen and stayed with the club for a test season in the 1988–89 Nationalliga A.

After spending this one season with FCSG, Hangarter transferred to Grasshopper Club for the 1989–90 Nationalliga A season. Hangarter won the Nationalliga A championship that season. But the club did not prolong Hangarter's contract and so he returned to his club of origin.

Hangarter joined FC Basel's first team for their 1990–91 season under head-coach Ernst-August Künnecke. After playing in one test game, Hangarter played his domestic league debut for the club in the away game on 25 July 1989 as Basel won 3–0 against Kriens. In his one season with the club, Hangarter played a total of eight games for Basel without scoring a goal. Four of these games were in the Nationalliga B and the other four were friendly games.

Following his time with Basel, Hangartner returned again to FC Brüttisellen for two seasons. He spent the season 1992–93 with FC Chur and the season 1993–94 with FC Chiasso. After then spending two seasons with AC Bellinzona he moved on and ended his football career after the 1996–97 season that he spent with FC Gossau.

== Private life ==
Following his playing career, Hangarter worked in sportmarketing and then as sport merchandising director. In 2002 he became technical manager for the Football Association of the Region Zurich and stayed in this position until 2016. During this time, he was also five years assistant coach to the Switzerland women's national football team, from January 2005 to January 2010. Since March 2016 Hangartner is the Technical Manager and Head of the Nachwuchs-Leistungs-Zentrum (youth talent centre) of Grasshopper Club Zürich in Niederhäsli, Dietlikon, Zurich.

== Sources ==
- Die ersten 125 Jahre. Publisher: Josef Zindel im Friedrich Reinhardt Verlag, Basel. ISBN 978-3-7245-2305-5
- Verein "Basler Fussballarchiv" Homepage
