= Jörg Heuting =

German footballer (born 1969)

Personal information
- Full name: Jörg Heuting
- Date of birth: 11 December 1969 (age 56)
- Place of birth: Germany
- Positions: Midfielder; forward

Youth career
- until 1988: FC Concordia Basel

Senior career*
Years	Team	Apps	(Gls)
1988–1989	FC Concordia Basel		
1989–1990	FC Basel	5	(0)
- * Club domestic league appearances and goals

Jörg Heuting (born 11 December 1969) is a German former footballer who played in the late 1980s and early 1990s. He played mainly in the position of forward, but also as a midfielder.

Heuting played his youth football with FC Concordia Basel and advanced to the first team in the summer 1988. A year later, he joined FC Basel's first team for their 1989–90 season and signed his first professional contract under head-coach Urs Siegenthaler in the second tier of Swiss football. After playing in four test games he made his debut in the Swiss Cup on 20 August 1989. He was substituted in for the injured Erni Maissen at half time and during the second half he scored two goals as Basel cruised to an 8–0 victory.

Heuting made his domestic league debut for the club on 7 October as Basel won 3–0 away to Fribourg. But Heuting never advanced to more than being on the substitute bench therefore he left the club as his contract expired at the end of the season. During that time Heuting played 14 games for Basel scoring five goals. Five of these games were in the Nationalliga A, one in the Swiss Cup, and eight were friendly games. He scored those two goals in the cup competition and the other three were scored during the test games.

== Sources ==
- Die ersten 125 Jahre. Publisher: Josef Zindel im Friedrich Reinhardt Verlag, Basel. ISBN 978-3-7245-2305-5
- Verein "Basler Fussballarchiv" Homepage
