= Manfred Wagner (footballer, born 1968) =

German footballer

Personal information
- Full name: Manfred Wagner
- Date of birth: 21 June 1968 (age 58)
- Place of birth: Germany
- Positions: Midfielder; forward

Senior career*
Years	Team	Apps	(Gls)
1988–1989	FC Steinen-Höllstein		
1989–1993	FC Basel	79	(9)
1993–1994	BSC Old Boys	24	(2)
- * Club domestic league appearances and goals

Manfred Wagner (born 21 June 1968) is a German former footballer who played in the late 1980s and the 1990s. He played mainly as a forward, but also as a midfielder.

Wagner first played for local club FC Steinen-Höllstein. He joined FC Basel's first team for their 1989–90 season and signed his first professional contract under head coach Urs Siegenthaler in the second tier of Swiss football. After playing in five test matches, Wagner made his domestic league debut for his new club in the home game at the St. Jakob Stadium on 22 July 1989 as Basel won 2–0 against Old Boys. Wagner scored his first goal for his club in the return match on 22 September as Basel played away in the Stadion Schützenmatte and won 5–1.

Wagner stayed with the club for three-and-a-half years. In the qualifying phase of the 1992–93 season Wagner only had two appearances as substitute, so during the winter break he moved on. During his time with the club Wagner played 112 games for Basel scoring fifteen goals; 79 games were in the Nationalliga B, 5 in the Swiss Cup and 28 were friendly games. He scored nine goals in the domestic league, two in the cup and the other four were scored during the test games.

Following his time with Basel Wagner signed for local rivals BSC Old Boys and stayed with them for at least one-and-a-half years.

== Sources ==
- Die ersten 125 Jahre. Publisher: Josef Zindel im Friedrich Reinhardt Verlag, Basel. ISBN 978-3-7245-2305-5
- Verein "Basler Fussballarchiv" Homepage
