= Sascha Reich =

Swiss footballer (born 1969)

Personal information
- Full name: Sascha Reich
- Date of birth: 24 December 1969 (age 56)
- Place of birth: Basel, Switzerland
- Positions: Defender; midfielder

Senior career*
Years	Team	Apps	(Gls)
1987–1989	AC Bellinzona	21	(0)
1989–1991	FC Basel	60	(5)
1991–1995	BSC Young Boys	90	(5)
1995–1996	FC Baden	19	(3)
- * Club domestic league appearances and goals

Sascha Reich (born 24 December 1969) is a Swiss former footballer who played in the late 1980s and 1990s. He played mainly as defender, but also as midfielder.

Reich first played two seasons for AC Bellinzona. He joined FC Basel's first team for their 1989–90 season under head-coach Urs Siegenthaler in the second tier of Swiss football. After playing in four test matches, Wagner played his domestic league debut for his new club in the home game at the St. Jakob Stadium on 22 July 1989 as Basel won 2–0 against Old Boys. Reich scored his first goal for his club on 12 August in the away game as Basel won 4–0 against La Chaux-de-Fonds.

He stayed with the club for two seasons, and during this time Reich played a total of 85 games for Basel, scoring a total of five goals. 60 of these games were in the Nationalliga A, five in the Swiss Cup and 20 were friendly games. He scored all his goals for the club in the domestic league.

Following his time with Basel, Reich moved on to play four seasons with BSC Young Boys and in the summer of 1995 he moved on to FC Baden.

== Sources ==
- Die ersten 125 Jahre. Publisher: Josef Zindel im Friedrich Reinhardt Verlag, Basel. ISBN 978-3-7245-2305-5
- Verein "Basler Fussballarchiv" Homepage
