= René Spicher =

Swiss footballer (born 1963)

Personal information
- Full name: René Spicher
- Date of birth: 6 March 1963 (age 63)
- Place of birth: Switzerland
- Positions: Defender; midfielder

Senior career*
Years	Team	Apps	(Gls)
1987–1989	BSC Old Boys	56	(3)
1989–1990	FC Basel	8	(1)
- * Club domestic league appearances and goals

René Spicher (born 6 March 1963) is a retired Swiss footballer who played in the late 1980s and early 1990s. He played as defender or as midfielder.

Spicher first played two seasons with BSC Old Boys in the Nationalliga B, the second tier of Swiss football. In both seasons he played regularly in the teams starting 11.

Spicher then joined FC Basel's first team for their 1989–90 season under head-coach Urs Siegenthaler, also in the second tier of Swiss football. After playing in two test matches, Spicher played his domestic league debut for his new club in the home game at the St. Jakob Stadium on 22 July 1989 as Basel won 2–0 against his old club Old Boys. Spicher scored his first goal for his club on 23 August in the away game as Basel played a 2–2 draw with Chênois.

He stayed with the club only this one season and during this time Spicher played a total of 12 games for Basel scoring that one goal. 8 of these games were in the Nationalliga A, two in the Swiss Cup and two were friendly games.

== Sources ==
- Die ersten 125 Jahre. Publisher: Josef Zindel im Friedrich Reinhardt Verlag, Basel. ISBN 978-3-7245-2305-5
- Verein "Basler Fussballarchiv" Homepage
