= Boris Mancastroppa =

Swiss footballer and pop artist

Boris Mancastroppa-Dondé (2 July 1968) is a Swiss pop artist and former footballer.

He is known for his starting roles with FC Red Star Zürich, FC Basel and FC Schaffhausen. Since 1996 he has been running the art gallery started by his uncle Daniele Dondé, both as an artist and frontman.

== Career ==
Boris Mancastroppa
Personal information
- Full name: Boris Mancastroppa-Dondé
- Date of birth: 2 July 1968 (age 58)
- Place of birth: Switzerland
- Positions: Midfielder; striker

Senior career*
Years	Team	Apps	(Gls)
1988–1989	FC Red Star Zürich		
1989–1992	FC Basel	24	(4)
1992–1994	FC Schaffhausen	42	(3)
- * Club domestic league appearances and goals

=== Football career ===
Mancastroppa played mainly as a striker, but also occasionally as a midfielder, in the late 1980s and early 1990s. In 1988-89 he made his debut playing for FC Red Star Zürich in the 1st league, the third league of Swiss football.

In the 1989–90 season he joined the first team of FC Basel and signed his first professional contract under the guidance of coach Urs Siegenthaler, making his debut in the second league of the national championship in the home game at St. Jakob Stadium on 22 July 1989. In the same match he scored his first goal for the club. Substituted in the 74th minute, he scored Basel's second goal in the 2-0 win over Old Boys in the 87th minute.

He stayed with the club for three seasons and during this time Mancastroppa played a total of 50 games for Basel scoring a total of six goals. 24 of these games were in the Nationalliga A, two were in the Swiss Cup and 24 were friendly matches. He scored four goals in the domestic league and the other two were scored during test matches.

After his time with Basel, Mancastroppa moved on to play for FC Schaffhausen, again in the second tier of Swiss football. Here he played as a regular starter.

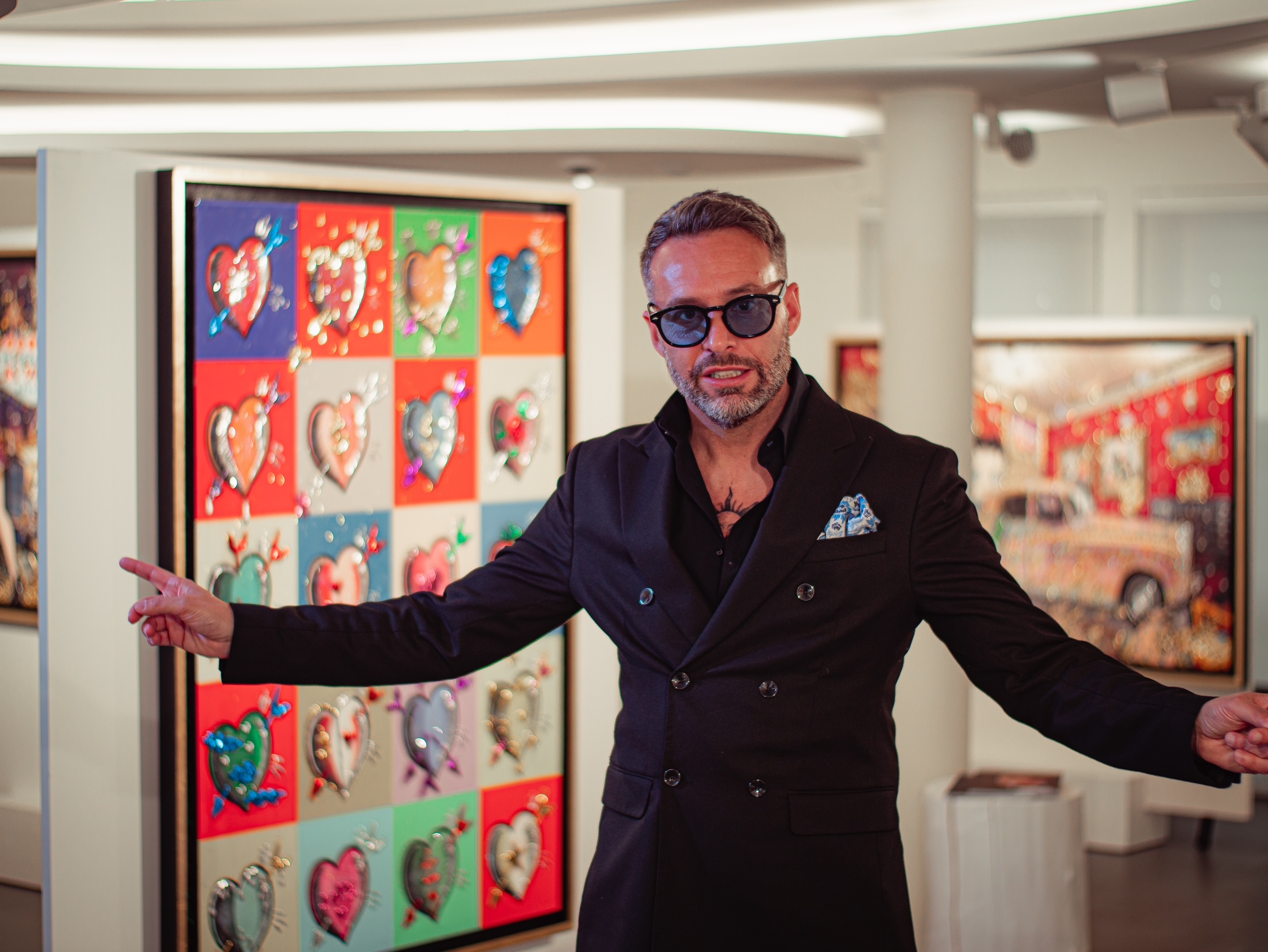
Boris presenting artworks from the new Love Collection in 2021.

=== The pop art gallery ===
In 1996, after the end of his sporting career, Boris officially joined the team of the pop art gallery created by his uncle Daniele Dondé, an Italian artist known worldwide for creating pieces heavily inspired by classic artworks. Thanks to the impetus provided by Boris's new ideas to improve the gallery's visibility and the resonance of the first exhibition in Monte Carlo, the Dondé Art Gallery managed to gain a worldwide audience.

In 2020, after almost 20 years of running the gallery and its events, Boris took over the management of the now famous Dondé brand as the uncle retired. The main goal of his new management would admittedly be to move away from the artistic line of Daniele Dondé's Faux Art, towards a more contemporary concept of Pop Art. The gallery plans to penetrate the online market with a brand new e-commerce portal.

Boris is currently the active artist of the gallery, publishing artworks all over the world, through the Dondé Art Gallery's permanent locations and temporary exhibitions all around Europe, especially in Monaco, Italy and Switzerland.

== Sources ==
- Die ersten 125 Jahre. Publisher: Josef Zindel im Friedrich Reinhardt Verlag, Basel. ISBN 978-3-7245-2305-5
- Verein "Basler Fussballarchiv" Homepage
