= Necip Ugras =

Turkish-Swiss footballer (born 1967)

Personal information
- Date of birth: 11 August 1967 (age 59)
- Place of birth: Locarno, Switzerland
- Position: Forward

Senior career*
| Years | Team | Apps | (Gls) |
| 1988–1989 | Grasshopper Club | | |
| 1989–1990 | FC Zug | | |
| 1990–1991 | BSC Old Boys | | |
| 1991 | FC Zug | | |
| 1992 | FC Chur | | |
| 1993–2001 | FC Tuggen | | |
- * Club domestic league appearances and goals

Necip Ugras (born 11 August 1967) is a retired Turkish-Swiss football striker.

== Honours ==
Grasshoppers

- Swiss Super Cup: 1989
