= Uwe Dittus =

German former footballer

Personal information
- Date of birth: 3 August 1959 (age 67)
- Place of birth: Birkenfeld, West Germany
- Height: 1.79 m (5 ft 10 in)
- Position: Midfielder

Youth career
- until 1979: 1. FC 08 Birkenfeld

Senior career*
Years	Team	Apps	(Gls)
1979–1986	Karlsruher SC	203	(15)
1986–1987	Viktoria Aschaffenburg	35	(2)
1987	F.C. Winterslag	17	(0)
1988–1991	FC Basel	97	(27)

International career
1979–1980	West Germany U-21		
- * Club domestic league appearances and goals

Uwe Dittus (born 3 August 1959) is a German former footballer who played as a midfielder throughout the 1980s.

== Career ==
Dittus played his youth football by amateur club 1. FC 08 Birkenfeld. He started playing professionally in 1979 with Karlsruher SC under head-coach Manfred Krafft in the 2. Bundesliga, the second tier of German football. It was very difficult for Dittus here to start with, because at first he was simply not strong enough to keep up with the older experienced players. Trainer Krafft had recognized the talent of the youngster Dittus and promoted the midfield player. At the end of the 1979–80 2. Bundesliga Süd Dittus and the team won promotion. During seven seasons he went on to make over 200 appearances for the club before he left in 1986 to join Viktoria Aschaffenburg. He played at Viktoria for just one season and signed for Belgium's F.C. Winterslag in 1987. He was there for just one season.

Dittus joined FC Basel during the winter break of their 1987–88 season signing a contract under head-coach Urs Siegenthaler. After playing in six test games Dittus played his domestic league debut for his new club in the home match in the St. Jakob Stadium on 5 March 1988 as Basel won 4–0 against Etoile Carouge. He scored his first goal for the club on 30 March in an away game, but the goal could not help the team very much as Basel lost 1–4 against Bellinzona. His teammates included goalie Urs Suter, the defenders Peter Bernauer and Massimo Ceccaroni, the Scott Gordon Duffield Smith and Swiss national team players such as Adrian Knup, Dominique Herr and Peter Nadig. Despite this personally strongly occupied team Basel were relegated to the Nationalliga B after the 1987–88 Nationalliga A season.

Despite relegation Dittus stayed with the club for another three seasons and then he retired after the 1990–91 Nationalliga A season. During his time with the club Dittus played a total of 146 games for Basel scoring a total of 41 goals. 97 of these games were in the Nationalliga A, 10 in the Swiss Cup and 39 were friendly games. He scored 27 goal in the domestic league, four in the cup and the other 10 were scored during the test games.

From 1979 until 1980, he played for the West German Under-21 team.

Following his football playing days, Dittus was the tour manager of the music group "Pur" for many years.

== Sources ==
- Die ersten 125 Jahre. Publisher: Josef Zindel im Friedrich Reinhardt Verlag, Basel. ISBN 978-3-7245-2305-5
- Verein "Basler Fussballarchiv" Homepage
