= Patrick Liniger =

Swiss footballer (born 1971)

Personal information
- Full name: Patrick Liniger
- Date of birth: 18 August 1971 (age 55)
- Place of birth: Switzerland
- Position: Defender

Youth career
- until 1988: FC Basel

Senior career*
Years	Team	Apps	(Gls)
1988–1991	FC Basel	16	(0)
2000–2002	SV Muttenz		
2002–2005	FC Breitenbach	41	(8)
2007–2008	SC Binningen		

Managerial career
- 2007–2008: SC Binningen
- * Club domestic league appearances and goals

Patrick Liniger (born 18 August 1971) is a Swiss former footballer who played in the late 1980s, the 1990s and the 2000s as defender.

Liniger played his youth football with FC Basel and advanced to their first team for their 1988–89 season and signed his first professional football contract under head coach Urs Siegenthaler. After playing in two test games, Liniger played his domestic league debut for the club in the home game at the St. Jakob Stadium on 11 March 1990 as Basel won 3–1 against Schaffhausen.

He stayed with the club for three years and during this time Liniger played a total of 25 games for Basel without scoring a goal. 16 of these games were in the Nationalliga B, one in the Swiss Cup and eight were friendly games.

After his time with Basel, Liniger moved on and played for various local teams and became coach. Towards the end of his playing career Liniger played for SC Binningen in the Swiss Cup against his club of origin on 20 October 2007. Basel advanced to the next round winning 6–1.

== Sources ==
- Die ersten 125 Jahre. Publisher: Josef Zindel im Friedrich Reinhardt Verlag, Basel. ISBN 978-3-7245-2305-5
- Verein "Basler Fussballarchiv" Homepage
