= Slobodan Rojević =

Montenegrin football manager and player

Personal information
- Date of birth: 30 April 1958 (age 68)
- Place of birth: Nikšić, PR Montenegro, FPR Yugoslavia
- Height: 1.80 m (5 ft 11 in)
- Position: Left-back

Senior career*
Years	Team	Apps	(Gls)
1977–1980	Sutjeska Nikšić	76	(3)
1981–1986	Partizan	143	(1)
1986–1988	Sion	53	(11)
1988–1989	Yverdon-Sport	11	(0)
1989–1992	Fribourg	27+	(1+)
Total		310+	(16+)

Managerial career
- Domdidier
- Portalban/Gletterens
- 2000–2001: Fribourg
- Portalban/Gletterens
- 2006–2007: Fribourg
- 2008–2010: Portalban/Gletterens
- Domdidier
- * Club domestic league appearances and goals

Slobodan Rojević (Serbian Cyrillic: Слободан Ројевић; born 30 April 1958) is a Montenegrin former football manager and player.

== Playing career ==
Rojević started out at his hometown club Sutjeska Nikšić, making 76 appearances and scoring three goals in the Yugoslav Second League from 1977 to 1980. He was subsequently transferred to Partizan in the summer of 1981. Over the next five seasons at the Stadion JNA, Rojević amassed 143 appearances and scored one goal in the Yugoslav First League, while winning two championship titles.

In the summer of 1986, Rojević moved abroad to Switzerland and signed with Sion. He spent two seasons at the club, before switching to Yverdon. A year later, Rojević joined fellow Swiss club Fribourg, before retiring from the game.

== Managerial career ==
After hanging up his boots, Rojević remained living and working in Switzerland, mainly serving as manager at several clubs in the Canton of Fribourg, including FC Fribourg on two occasions.

== Honours ==
Partizan

- Yugoslav First League: 1982–83, 1985–86
