= Patrick Rahmen =

Swiss footballer (born 1969)

Personal information
- Date of birth: 3 April 1969 (age 57)
- Place of birth: Basel, Switzerland
- Height: 1.83 m (6 ft 0 in)
- Positions: Midfielder; forward

Youth career
- until 1985: Nordstern Basel
- 1985–1987: Basel

Senior career*
Years	Team	Apps	(Gls)
1987–1991	Basel	45	(8)
1991–1992	Young Boys		
1992–1993	Basel	25	(10)
1993–1994	SR Delémont		
1994–1995	FC Solothurn		
1999–2000	SV Muttenz		

Managerial career
- 2000–2004: SC Dornach (player-coach)
- 2004–2007: Basel (U-18)
- 2007–2011: Basel (U-21)
- 2011–2013: Hamburger SV (assistant)
- 2014–2015: Hamburger SV (youth)
- 2014–2015: Hamburger SV (assistant)
- 2015–2016: FC Biel-Bienne
- 2016–2018: FC Luzern (assistant)
- 2018–2020: FC Aarau
- 2020–2021: Basel (assistant)
- 2021–2022: Basel
- 2022–2023: Switzerland U21
- 2023–2024: Winterthur
- 2024: Young Boys
- 2025–: Winterthur
- * Club domestic league appearances and goals

Patrick Rahmen (born 3 April 1969) is a Swiss football coach and former player. He played as a midfielder or a forward. He is currently the head coach of FC Winterthur in the Swiss Super League.

== Club career ==
Patrick Rahmen learned his football skill playing with Nordstern Basel and then in the FC Basel youth system. He advanced to their first team for their 1987–88 season signing his first professional contract under head-coach Urs Siegenthaler. Rahmen played his domestic league debut for his club in an away match on 20 March 1988 as Basel won 2–0 against Bulle. His teammates included goalie Urs Suter, the defenders Peter Bernauer and Massimo Ceccaroni, the Scott Gordon Duffield Smith and Switzerland national team players such as Adrian Knup, Dominique Herr and Peter Nadig. Despite this personally strongly occupied team Basel were relegated to the Nationalliga B after the 1987–88 Nationalliga A season.

In the following season, Rahmen scored his first goal for his club in the Swiss Cup on 20 August 1988 in the away game as Basel won 5–0 against local lower-tier club FC Oberwil. It wasn't until the next season until he scored his first league goal for the club. In the home game at the St. Jakob Stadium on 18 November 1989 he scored the first goal of the match as Basel won 2–0 against Chênois. Rahmen spent the 1991–92 season with BSC Young Boys but he returned to Basel for the next season, only to leave the club a year later.

Between the years 1987 to 1991 and again 1992 to 1993 Rahmen played a total of 128 games for Basel scoring a total of 30 goals. 78 of these games were in the Nationalliga A, eight in the Swiss Cup and 42 were friendly games. He scored 18 goals in the domestic league, three in the cup and the other nine were scored during the test games.

Rahmen then moved on to play the 1993–94 season with SR Delémont, who played in the same Nationalliga B group as his previous club. He then played for FC Solothurn in a lower league.

== Coaching career ==
From the summer of 2000 until December 2004 Rahmen was coach of SC Dornach in the 1. Liga, first as player-coach then as head-coach. Then he was hired by FC Basel to coach their U-18 youth team. In 2007, he took over as coach of the U-21 team. In October 2011, as the that time Basel first team manager Thorsten Fink left the club and signed a contract to become manager of Hamburger SV in the Fußball-Bundesliga, Rahmen followed him and became his assistant.

As of 1 July 2018, was appointed as the head coach of FC Aarau and had signed a two-year contract. As the contract expired it was not extended.

On 21 September 2020, FC Basel announced that they had hired Rahmen as second assistant trainer under their new manager Ciriaco Sforza. On 6 April 2021, the club announced that, due to the lack of sporting success, FC Basel 1893 were separating themselves from head coach Ciriaco Sforza with immediate effect. They also announced that they had separated themselves from assistant manager Daniel Hasler at the same time. Until the end of the season, the first team would be looked after by the other previous assistant Rahmen, on an interim, basis as head coach. In the communique on the following day it was announced that Ognjen Zaric was appointed as assistant manager. Zaric had been coach of the Basel 1893 U-18 team since summer 2020 and before that he had been head coach of TSV 1860 Rosenheim in the Regionalliga Bayern, the fourth tier of German football.

On 20 May 2021, FC Basel announced that Rahmen had signed a new contract that made him head coach of the FCB first team. To the end of the calendar year there was an amount of press reports that Rahmen would be replaced, but then, on 31 December the club announced that the contract with head coach had been extended for a further year until summer 2023. However, just a few weeks later, on 21 February the club announced that the contract with Rahmen had been terminated, due to "unsatisfactory sportive development of the team and lack of clear perspective".

Between 2022 and 2023, he was the coach of the Switzerland national under-21 football team.

On 14 June 2023, he was appointed head coach of FC Winterthur. He will join the club following the 2023 U21 Euros. With Winterthur he managed to qualify for the Championship Group during the regular season, despite coaching one of the weaker teams of the league on paper.

On 14 May 2024, he was announced as the new head coach of Swiss serial champions BSC Young Boys for the upcoming season. Following a poor start in the league, which saw the team in last place with just six points and one win after nine games played, his appointment with Young Boys was terminated. Despite the poor league results, he did successfully qualify to the group stage of the UEFA Champions League, beating Galatasaray 4–2 on aggregate in the playoff round of qualifying. However, at the time of his dismissal, Young Boys sat bottom of the Champions League table, following 0–3 and 0–5 losses to Aston Villa and FC Barcelona, respectively.

On 22 October 2025, he returned to FC Winterthur, replacing recently dismissed Uli Forte and taking over the team sitting in last place with just two points out of nine games in the 2025–26 Swiss Super League.

== Personal life ==
Patrick's father is Bruno Rahmen, who was also a former Swiss football player and five-time winner of the Swiss League Championship. Later Bruno Rahmen worked as football manager. Patrick's brother is Micha and was also a professional footballer.

== Sources ==
- Die ersten 125 Jahre. Publisher: Josef Zindel im Friedrich Reinhardt Verlag, Basel. ISBN 978-3-7245-2305-5
- Verein "Basler Fussballarchiv" Homepage
