= Michel Duc =

Swiss footballer (born 1960)

Personal information
- Date of birth: 9 September 1960 (age 66)
- Position: Defender

Senior career*
| Years | Team | Apps | (Gls) |
| 1981–1983 | FC Bulle | | |
| 1983–1988 | FC Lausanne-Sport | | |
| 1988–1994 | FC Bulle | | |
- * Club domestic league appearances and goals

Michel Duc (born 9 September 1960) is a retired Swiss football defender.
