= Roberto Gatti =

Italian footballer

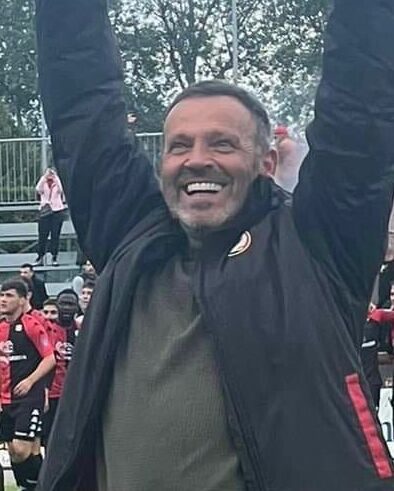

Personal information
- Date of birth: 20 October 1964 (age 62)
- Place of birth: Torino
- Height: 1.79 m (5 ft 10 in)
- Position: Defender

Senior career*
Years	Team	Apps	(Gls)
1983–1987	Varese Calcio		
1987–1990	FC Lugano		
1990–1993	FC Chiasso		

Managerial career
- 1996–1999: FC Chiasso
- 2001–2002: FC Chiasso
- * Club domestic league appearances and goals

Roberto Gatti (born 20 October 1964) is a retired Italian football defender and later manager.
