= Andreas Steiner (footballer) =

Swiss footballer (born 1971)

Personal information
- Full name: Andreas Steiner
- Date of birth: 23 August 1971 (age 55)
- Position: Midfielder

Youth career
- until 1990: FC Basel

Senior career*
Years	Team	Apps	(Gls)
1990–1993	FC Basel	12	(0)
- * Club domestic league appearances and goals

Andreas Steiner (born 23 August 1971) is a Swiss former footballer who played in the 1990s as midfielder.

Steiner played his youth football with FC Basel and joined their first team during their 1990–91 season under head-coach Ernst-August Künnecke. Steiner played his domestic league debut for the club in the last game of the season, an away game, on 12 June 1991 as Basel were defeated 1–2 by Étoile Carouge.

He stayed with the club for three seasons and during this time Steiner played a total of 21 games for Basel without scoring a goal. 12 of these games were in the Nationalliga A and nine were friendly games.

== Sources ==
- Andreas Steiner at WorldFootball.net
- Die ersten 125 Jahre. Publisher: Josef Zindel im Friedrich Reinhardt Verlag, Basel. ISBN 978-3-7245-2305-5
- Verein "Basler Fussballarchiv" Homepage
