= Ruedi Zbinden =

Swiss footballer (born 1959)

Personal information
- Full name: Ruedi Zbinden
- Date of birth: 30 March 1959
- Place of birth: Rheinfelden
- Height: 1.76 m (5 ft 9 in)
- Position: Striker

Youth career
- until 1978: Nordstern Basel

Senior career*
Years	Team	Apps	(Gls)
1978–1982	Nordstern Basel	65	(19)
1982–1986	Basel	75	(12)
1986	Grenchen	15	(0)
1986–1987	Wettingen	29	(5)
1987–1989	Bellinzona	32	(2)
1989–1993	Basel	112	(26)
1993–1994	Bellinzona	14	(1)
- * Club domestic league appearances and goals

Ruedi Zbinden (born 30 March 1959) is a Swiss former footballer and is now Sporting Director of FC Basel.

== Active football career ==
=== Nordstern Basel ===
Zbinden played mainly in the position of striker, but also as a midfielder. He started his youth football by Nordstern Basel and advanced to the first team in 1978. In his first season by Nordstern they were relegated to the Nationalliga B. The following season, 1979–80, they achieved immediate promotion. Zbinden scored 12 goals in 25 games in that promotion season. He continued to play for Nordstern until the end of the 1981–82 Nationalliga A season, as the team again suffered relegation.

=== FC Basel ===
Zbinden transferred to local rivals Basel for their 1982–83 season. At that time Rainer Ohlhauser was the first team manager, he had taken over from Helmut Benthaus. Zbinden played for the club for four years until the season 1985–86. His further trainers during this period were Ernst August Künnecke, Emil Müller and later Benthaus after his return. After three test matches and four matches in the Cup of the Alps, Zbinden played his domestic league debut for his new club in the home game at the Landhof on 14 August 1982 as Basel were defeated 0–1 by the Young Boys. He scored his first goal for his club on 28 August in the home game as Basel won 5–1 against Vevey-Sports. In his first season with Basel he played 28 of the 30 league matches and all three cup games. Also during the following two seasons Zbinden was mainly a part of the starting eleven.

But in their 1985–86 season, under Benthaus, Zbinden did not get very much playing time, just four out of 15 matches, therefore he decided to move on.

=== Grenchen ===
During the winter break of the 1985–86 Nationalliga A season Zbinden moved on to Grenchen, who had won promotion the previous season. He played all 15 games in the second half of that season, but without scoring a goal. The team ended the season in 15th position and thus with Grenchen Zbinden again suffered relegation.

=== Wettingen ===
For the 1986–87 Nationalliga A season Zbinden signed for Wettingen. He played 26 of the 30 domestic league matches and the three playout games, scoring a total of five goals. But with Wettingen he suffered his second successive relegation, this was the fourth relegation of his career.

=== Bellinzona ===
For the 1987–88 Nationalliga A season Zbinden transferred to Bellinzona. The league format had changed, the first stage was a qualification stage for the championship. Bellinzona were unsuccessful and therefore had to play in a promotion/relegation stage. Zbinden played 17 of the 22 games in the first stage, but due to injury just one in second stage. Nevertheless Bellinzona stayed in the top tier of the Swiss football league. Zbinden recovered from his injury during the next seasons first stage, but he was only able to play one game. In the championship group the team Bellinzona could only score 9 goals and so finished in seventh position.

=== FC Basel ===
Zbinden returned to FC Basel for their 1989–90 season, Urs Siegenthaler was trainer at that time. Two seasons earlier Basel had been relegated to the Nationalliga B and had missed the hoped immediate promotion. Zbinden was signed in to strengthen the team. He scored five goals in 17 matches in the qualifying phase and two goals in 10 matches in the promotion/relegation stage. But Basel missed promotion finishing in third position in the league table. Zbinden played another four seasons with Basel, but the team remained unsuccessful in gaining promotion. The further trainers during this second period with Basel were again Ernst August Künnecke, then Bruno Rahmen and Karl Odermatt, who together both acted as interims trainer following Künnecke dismissal and finally Friedel Rausch was his trainer during Basel's 1992–93 season.

Altogether between the years 1982 to 1986 and again from 1989 to 1993, Zbinden played a total of 303 games for Basel, scoring a total of 71 goals. 187 of these games were in the Swiss Serie A, 19 in the Swiss Cup, three in the Cup of the Alps and 94 were friendly games. He scored 38 goal in the domestic league, four in the domestic Cup, two in the Cup of the Alps and the other 27 were scored during the test games.

=== Bellinzona ===
In his final year as active footballer Zbinden returned to play for Bellinzona for the 1993–94 season.

== FC Basel management ==
In the years 1996 to 1999 Zbinden worked for Basel as youth trainer. On 15 June 1999 Christian Gross was appointed as the new trainer of the Basel first team and he assigned Zbinden as his co-trainer. Zbinden worked under Gross for two seasons. In year 2001 Zbinden continued with the club as scout, soon becoming head scout. He holds this position since and during this time has discovered many important players for the club. On 20 June 2019 he was named as sportdirector following Marco Streller’s denunciation from the position just the week before.

== Honours ==
Nordstern

- Promotion to Swiss Super League: 1979–80

== Sources ==
- Rotblau: Jahrbuch Saison 2017/2018. Publisher: FC Basel Marketing AG. ISBN 978-3-7245-2189-1
- Die ersten 125 Jahre. Publisher: Josef Zindel im Friedrich Reinhardt Verlag, Basel. ISBN 978-3-7245-2305-5
- Verein "Basler Fussballarchiv" Homepage
