= Vittorio Gottardi =

Swiss footballer (born 1967)

Personal information
- Full name: Vittorio Gottardi
- Date of birth: 18 March 1967 (age 59)
- Place of birth: Switzerland
- Positions: Midfielder; forward

Senior career*
Years	Team	Apps	(Gls)
1988–1989	SC Dornach		
1989–1992	FC Basel	83	(2)
1992–1993	SC Dornach		
- * Club domestic league appearances and goals

Vittorio Gottardi (born 18 March 1967) is a Swiss former footballer who played in the late 1980s and early 1990s. He played mainly as a forward, but also as a midfielder.

Gottardi first played for SC Dornach in the fourth tier of Swiss football. He joined FC Basel's first team for their 1989–90 season and signed his first professional contract under head coach Urs Siegenthaler in the second tier of Swiss football. After playing in three test games, Gottardi played his domestic league debut for his new club in the home game in the St. Jakob Stadium on 9 September 1989 as Basel won 2–0 against Grenchen. Gottardi scored his first goal for his club in the home game on 28 July 1990. But it was not enough to save the team, as Basel were defeated 1–2 by Locarno.

Gottardi stayed with the club for three seasons and was a regular starter in the team. During his time with the club Gottardi played 123 games scoring four goals; 83 games were in the Nationalliga A, five in the Swiss Cup and 35 were friendly games. He scored two goals in the domestic league, the other two were scored during the test games.

Following his time with Basel, Gottardi returned to his club of origin.

== Sources ==
- Die ersten 125 Jahre. Publisher: Josef Zindel im Friedrich Reinhardt Verlag, Basel. ISBN 978-3-7245-2305-5
- Verein "Basler Fussballarchiv" Homepage
