= Brian Bertelsen =

Danish footballer (born 1963)

Personal information
- Date of birth: 19 April 1963 (age 63)
- Position: Midfielder

Senior career*
Years	Team	Apps	(Gls)
1982–1985	Vejle BK		
1986–1990	FC Wettingen		
1990–1991	FC Basel		
1991–1992	FC St. Gallen		
1992–1995	FC Luzern		
1995–1996	FC Locarno		
- * Club domestic league appearances and goals

Brian Bertelsen (born 19 April 1963) is a Danish retired football midfielder.
