= Ralph Thoma =

Swiss footballer (born 1965)

Personal information
- Full name: Ralph Thoma
- Date of birth: 27 August 1965 (age 61)
- Place of birth: Switzerland
- Position: Forward

Senior career*
Years	Team	Apps	(Gls)
1986–1987	FC Rheinfelden		
1987–1990	FC Basel	89	(25)
1990–1991	FC Rheinfelden		
1991–1992	FC Riehen		
1992–1995	FC Chiasso	44	(5)
- * Club domestic league appearances and goals

Ralph Thoma (born 27 August 1965) is a Swiss former footballer who played in the late 1980s and the 1990s as a forward.

Thoma first played for local club FC Rheinfelden. He joined FC Basel's first team in their 1987–88 season under head-coach Urs Siegenthaler. After playing in six test games, Thoma played his domestic league debut for the club in the away game on 8 August 1987 as Basel were defeated 0–2 by Aarau. Thoma scored his first goal for his club one week later, on 15 August, in the away game as Basel were defeated 1–9 by Xamax. Up until today this is still the highest score defeat that Basel have suffered in their domestic league history. Xamax manager at that time was Gilbert Gress. The goal scorers were Robert Lüthi, Robert Lei-Ravello, Beat Sutter, Heinz Hermann (two apiece) and Alain Geiger. The only goal for Basel was scored by Thoma.

At the end of the 1987–88 Nationalliga A season, Thoma and the team suffered relegation, but he stayed with them for another two seasons. Between the years 1987 and 1990 Thoma played a total of 131 games for Basel, scoring a total of 35 goals. 89 of these games were in the Nationalliga A, eight in the Swiss Cup and 34 were friendly games. He scored 25 goals in the domestic league, two in the cup and the other eight were scored during the test games.

As his contract with Basel came to an end in June 1990, Thoma returned to his club of origin, FC Rheinfelden, for the 1990–91 season. Then he moved on to local club FC Riehen for the 1991–92 season. During the summer of 1992 newly promoted to the Nationalliga A team Chiasso signed Thoma on contract and he played for them for three years. At the end of the 1992–93 Nationalliga A Chiasso suffered relegation from the first tier of Swiss football to the second and the next they were again relegated to the third tier. At the end of the following season Thoma retired from active football.

== Sources ==
- Die ersten 125 Jahre. Publisher: Josef Zindel im Friedrich Reinhardt Verlag, Basel. ISBN 978-3-7245-2305-5
- Verein "Basler Fussballarchiv" Homepage
