= Miodrag Đurđević =

Yugoslav/Bosnian-Herzegovinian footballer

Personal information
- Full name: Miodrag Đurđević
- Date of birth: 2 June 1961 (age 65)
- Place of birth: Doboj, SFR Yugoslavia
- Position: Defender

Senior career*
Years	Team	Apps	(Gls)
1978–1985	Borac Banja Luka	136	(9)
1985–1988	Čelik Zenica	72	(3)
1989	Dinamo Zagreb	22	(0)
1989–1992	FC Basel	33	(1)
1993–1994	SG Lörrach-Stetten	28	(3)
1994–2000	FC Breitenbach	135	(6)
- * Club domestic league appearances and goals

Miodrag Đurđević (born 2 June 1961 in Doboj) is a Yugoslav/Bosnian-Herzegovinian retired football player.

== Club career ==
On the club level, Đurđević advanced to Borac Banja Luka's first team in 1978. He played with the club for seven seasons before he moved on to Čelik Zenica in 1985. He stayed with them until the winter break of the 1988–1989. Đurđević then moved on to Dinamo Zagreb.

One year later Đurđević joined FC Basel's first team during the winter break of their 1989–90 season, in the second tier of Swiss football, under head-coach Ernst-August Künnecke. After playing in eight test games Đurđević played his domestic league debut for the club in the home game in the St. Jakob Stadium on 25 February 1990 as Basel won 1–0 against Chur. He scored his first goal for his club in the home game on 28 April and, with his equaliser to the 1–1 draw in the last minute of the game, Đurđević saved the team from a defeat against Yverdon-Sports.

During his one and a half seasons with the club, Đurđević played a total of 54 games for Basel scoring just that one aforementioned goal. 33 Of these games were in the Nationalliga B, two in the Swiss Cup and 19 were friendly games.

Following his time with Basel Đurđević ended his professional football career and moved on to play for local club SG Lörrach-Stetten.

== Sources ==
- Die ersten 125 Jahre. Publisher: Josef Zindel im Friedrich Reinhardt Verlag, Basel. ISBN 978-3-7245-2305-5
- Verein "Basler Fussballarchiv" Homepage
