= André Rindlisbacher =

Swiss footballer (born 1963)

Andre Rindlisbacher
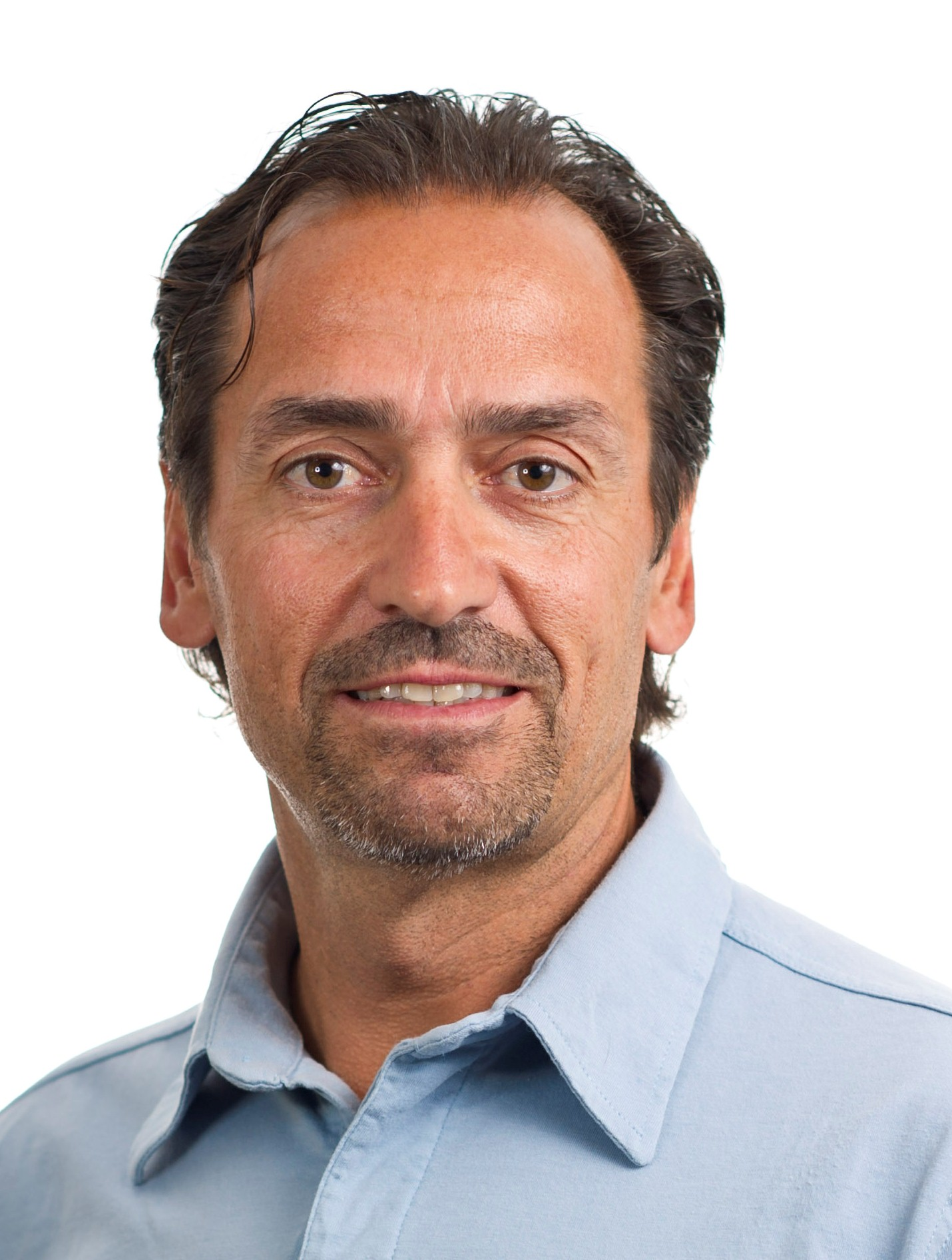
- Rindlisbacher in 2020

Personal information
- Date of birth: 22 January 1963 (age 63)
- Place of birth: Zürich, Switzerland
- Height: 1.80 m (5 ft 11 in)
- Positions: Defender; midfielder

Senior career*
Years	Team	Apps	(Gls)
1984–1985	FC Zürich	0	(0)
1985–1986	FC Baden	23	(2)
1986–1988	FC Aarau	41	(0)
1988–1990	FC Basel	58	(1)
1990–1991	AC Bellinzona	26	(2)
1992–1998	FC Frauenfeld		
- * Club domestic league appearances and goals

Andre Rindlisbacher (born 22 January 1963) is a Swiss former footballer who played in the 1980s and 1990s. He mainly played in the position of a midfielder, but also as defender. He is now an entrepreneur and business owner.

== Football career ==
Rindlisbacher was first with FC Zürich in the first tier of Swiss football. But because of their existing formation he did not get and domestic league playing time with the team and therefore he moved on to FC Baden for the 1985–86 Nationalliga A season. Here he became part of the regular starting formation. But at the end of the season Rindlisbacher and the team suffered relegation. He moved on to FC Aarau and stayed with then for two seasons.

Rindlisbacher joined FC Basel's first team for their 1988–89 season under head coach Urs Siegenthaler. After playing in seven test games Rindlisbacher played his domestic league debut for his new club in the away game on 23 July 1988 as Basel played a 1–1 draw against Zürich. Rindlisbacher scored his first goal for his club on 13 May 1989 in the home game in the St. Jakob Stadium as Basel played a 1–1 draw with CS Chênois.

He stayed with club for two seasons and during this time Rindlisbacher played a total of 90 games for Basel scoring a total of three goals. 58 of these games were in the Nationalliga B, 10 in the Swiss Cup and 22 were friendly games. He scored one goal in the domestic league, one in the cup and the other was scored during the test games.

Rindlisbacher then moved on to play for AC Bellinzona, also in the second tier of Swiss football. A few years later he ended his active playing career with FC Frauenfeld playing with them for six seasons as team captain and midfield playmaker. During this time, in the 1994–95 season, Rindlisbacher also played with player-coach Joachim Löw in his first position as team manager.

== Private life ==
Andre Rindlisbacher has a twin brother. They are entrepreneurs and business owners. They founded the Freestar-Informatik AG in 1998 with the idea that in addition to the existing IT business project, a professional, free and creative work environment should be created for IT specialists. The business has continually been expanded. Today there are five Freestar companies.

Andre Rindlisbacher was member of FC Frauenfeld's board of directors and presided over the club for the period from 1998 to 2003.

== Sources ==
- Die ersten 125 Jahre. Publisher: Josef Zindel im Friedrich Reinhardt Verlag, Basel. ISBN 978-3-7245-2305-5
- Verein "Basler Fussballarchiv" Homepage
