= Peter Bernauer =

German footballer

Personal information
- Full name: Peter Bernauer
- Date of birth: 10 September 1965 (age 61)
- Place of birth: West Germany
- Height: 1.86 m (6 ft 1 in)
- Position: Defender

Youth career
- FC Bergalingen
- until 1985: FC Wehr 1912

Senior career*
Years	Team	Apps	(Gls)
1985–1987	SV 08 Laufenburg		
1987–1991	FC Basel	76	(2)
1991–1994	SV 08 Laufenburg		
1994–1995	BSC Old Boys		
1995–1996	FC Bülach		
1996–1998	FC Riehen		
1998–1999	FC Pratteln		
- * Club domestic league appearances and goals

Peter Bernauer (born 10 September 1965) is a former German professional football player who played in the late 1980s and the 1990s as defender. He is a successful business manager of a Swiss Pharmaceutical company.

== Football career ==
Peter Bernauer was brought up in Rickenbach, Baden-Württemberg. As a youngster he played Basketball for his local club and was called into the Germany national team. He played his youth football at the small club FC Bergalingen. Later he moved to FC Wehr 1912 and started his senior football career by SV 08 Laufenburg. After good performances for Laufenburg, Peter Bernauer trained on a trial basis with FC Aarau under head-coach Ottmar Hitzfeld. But at that time, the Aarau squad already had Uwe Wassmer and two other foreigners on their payroll, therefore for Bernauer, a commitment didn't work out.

Bernauer joined the FC Basel's first team in their 1987–88 season and signed his first professional contract under head-coach Urs Siegenthaler. After playing in four test games, Bernauer played his domestic league debut for his new club in the first match of the season, an away match on 8 August 1987 as Basel were defeated 0–1 by Aarau. His team mates included goalie Urs Suter, defender Massimo Ceccaroni, and Swiss national team players such as Adrian Knup, Dominique Herr and Peter Nadig. Despite this personally strongly occupied team Basel were relegated to the Nationalliga B after the 1987–88 Nationalliga A season.

Bernauer scored his first goal for his club in the Swiss Cup match on 13 November 1988. It was an away game and it was the winning goal as Basel won 1–0 after extra time against lower tier FC Töss. He scored his first league goal for his club on 27 November in the home game in the St. Jakob Stadium. Unfortunately it could not help the team, because Basel were defeated 1–4 by Baden. For three season Bernauer fought together and tried to win promotion to the top level, but to no avail.

Then Bernauer received an enquiry from Werder Bremen asking if he wanted to do a trial training there. The offer from the north of Germany sounded tempting, because coached by Otto Rehhagel they had a good Bundesliga team. As Bernauer packed his bags and drove north, Basel's coach Ernst-August Künnecke was furious and deleted him from the squad completely. Bernauer's time with Basel ended abruptly and early. The move to Werder did not come to stand. Bernauer would have liked to sign for English club Stoke City for the 1991–92 season. Coach at that time was Lou Macari and he used Bernauer several times in friendly matches. Bernauer would have fitted well into the team structure. However, the transfer failed due to the then substantial transfer fee of 250,000 francs.

Between the years 1987 and 1991 Bernauer played a total of 113 games for Basel scoring a total of seven goals. 76 of these games were in the Nationalliga B, eight in the Swiss Cup and 29 were friendly games. He scored four goals in the domestic league, two in the cup, the other was scored during the test games.

Bernauer ended his professional football career and returned to Laufenburg as amateur during the seasons 1991–1994. He then spent one year by BSC Old Boys (this was probably a semi-professional contract) and one year by FC Bülach before he ended his career by FC Riehen and FC Pratteln.

== Private life ==
Bernauer studied at the Baden-Wuerttemberg Cooperative State University Loerrach. He worked one year as assistant to the management of Comco Commercial Cooperation. In 1993 he moved on to Henkel as Head of Finance, Business Controller and Head of Back Office and Logistics.

Since 2005 he works for ASM Aerosol-Service AG, a pharmaceutical company in Möhlin, first as chief financial officer and since 2014 as chief executive officer.

== Sources ==
- Die ersten 125 Jahre. Publisher: Josef Zindel im Friedrich Reinhardt Verlag, Basel. ISBN 978-3-7245-2305-5
- Verein "Basler Fussballarchiv" Homepage
