= Uwe Wassmer =

German footballer

Personal information
- Date of birth: 22 January 1966 (age 60)
- Place of birth: Wehr, Baden-Württemberg, West Germany
- Height: 1.83 m (6 ft 0 in)
- Position: Striker

Team information
- Current team: SC Riegel (manager)

Senior career*
Years	Team	Apps	(Gls)
1985–1988	FC Aarau		
1988–1989	Schalke 04	35	(10)
1989–1990	FC Basel		
1990–1993	FC Aarau		
1993–1999	SC Freiburg	118	(30)
1999–2000	Waldhof Mannheim	11	(1)

Managerial career
- 2003–2008: Dottingen SV
- 2008–: SC Riegel
- * Club domestic league appearances and goals

Uwe Wassmer (born 22 January 1966) is a German former professional footballer who played as a striker during the 1980s and 1990s.

== Career ==
Wassmer was born in Wehr, Baden-Württemberg. He began his career in Switzerland with FC Aarau in 1985 and spent three years with the club before joining Schalke 04 of Germany. After just one season with Schalke, he returned to Switzerland to play for FC Basel. He spent just one season at Basel, also, and went back to FC Aarau for the second time in his career where he was part of the side that won the Swiss national title in 1992–93. In 1993, he signed for SC Freiburg where he went on to play over 100 matches, scoring 30 goals.

On 22 September 1996, while playing for Freiburg, Wassmer set a Bundesliga record in a game against Bayer Leverkusen, by scoring just 13 seconds after his introduction, making it the fastest goal ever scored by a substitute.

Waldhof Mannheim signed him in 1999 and he retired in the Summer of 2000.

On 1 July 2003, he became manager of amateur Swiss team Dottingen SV. During the 2003–04 season, his team were promoted to the regional league but were relegated after just one season. In August 2008, he was appointed manager of German side SC Riegel.
