= Urs Siegenthaler =

Swiss footballer and manager (born 1947)

Personal information
- Full name: Urs Siegenthaler
- Date of birth: 23 November 1947 (age 78)
- Place of birth: Basel
- Position: Defender

Youth career
- 1957–1965: Basel

Senior career*
Years	Team	Apps	(Gls)
1965–1973	Basel		
1973–1974	Xamax		
1974–1976	Young Boys		
1976–1977	Winterthur		
1977–1979	Basel		
1979–1980	Schaffhausen		
1980–1983	Laufen		

Managerial career
- 1979–1980: Schaffhausen
- 1980–1983: Laufen
- 1983–1984: Grenchen (Youth)
- 1984–1987: Switzerland (Trainer instructor)
- 1987–1990: Basel
- 1990–2004: Switzerland (Co-trainer) .
- 2005–2021: Germany (Chiefscout)
- * Club domestic league appearances and goals

Urs Siegenthaler (born 23 November 1947) is a former Swiss footballer, turned manager. Since 13 May 2005 he was a Chiefscout and Analyser for the Germany national team, until 11 November 2021.

== Playing career ==
Born in Basel, Siegenthaler started his football with local team FC Basel in 1957. He came through all their youth teams and, at the age of 18, he played his debut as a defender for the first team. With Basel he won the Swiss League championship five times and the Swiss Cup twice. He played the 1973–74 season for Xamax and then transferred to the Young Boys for two seasons. After playing one season for Winterthur he returned to Basel, where he ended his professional playing career.

== Managerial career ==
Siegenthaler obtained his trainer diplome at the German Sport University Cologne in 1978 and spent the Nationalliga 1979–80 season as player manager for Schaffhausen. He was then manager for FC Laufen as they reached the second highest tier of the Swiss football league system for the first time in the club's history.

He acted as a youth coach for FC Grenchen and as trainer instructor for the Swiss Football Association. From 1987 to 1990 he was chief coach of FC Basel and then co-coach of the Swiss national team. In May 2005 he was appointed as Analyser for the Germany national team during the time when Jürgen Klinsmann was trainer. Then as Joachim Löw was appointed chief coach, Siegenthalers contract as Chiefscout was prolonged.

== Honours ==
Basel

- Swiss League champion: 1966-67, 1968-69, 1969-70, 1971-72 1972-73
- Swiss Cup winner: 1966-67
- Swiss Cup runner-up: 1969–70, 1971–72, 1972–73
- Swiss League Cup winner: 1972
- Coppa delle Alpi winner: 1969, 1970
- Uhren Cup winner: 1969, 1970

== Sources and references ==
- Rotblau: Jahrbuch Saison 2015/2016. Publisher: FC Basel Marketing AG. ISBN 978-3-7245-2050-4
