= 1987–88 FC Zürich season =

FC Zürich 1987–88 football season

FC Zürich
1987–88 season
- Owner: Sven Hotz
- Chairman: Sven Hotz
- Head coach and from then: Hermann Stessl until September 1987; Friedhelm Konietzka
- Stadium: Letzigrund
- 1987–88 Nationalliga A: 12th of 12
- Promotion/relegation: 6th of 8, relegated
- 1987–88 Swiss Cup: Quarter-finals
- Top goalscorer: League: Thomas Bickel (9); All: Thomas Bickel (14)

The 1987–88 season was FC Zürich's 91st season in their existence, since their foundation in 1896. It was their 29th consecutive season in the top flight of Swiss football, following their promotion at the end of the 1957–58 season. FCZ played their home games in the Letzigrund and the stadium is located in the west of Zurich in the district of Altstetten, which is about three kilometers from the city center.

== Overview ==
=== ASF/SFV ===
There had been modifications to the Swiss Football Association (ASF/SFV) in advance of this season and the format of the Swiss Football League (Nationalliga) was changed accordingly. Now the number of clubs had now been increased from 32 to 36. As of this season there were 12 teams in the top-tier, the Nationalliga A (NLA). There were 24 teams in the second-tier, Nationalliga B (NLB), and these were divided into two groups, a West and an East group. The season was divided into two stages. In the first stage, the qualification phase, each team in each group played a double round-robin to decide their table positions.

The top eight teams from the NLA qualification phase would advance to the championship group and would decide the championship and over the qualification slots to next season's UEFA European competitions. The last four NLA teams would play against relegation, this against the top six teams in each group of the NLB who were also qualified to play in two promotion/relegation groups. The top two teams in each of these groups would play the following season in the NLA, the others would contest in the NLB.

=== Club ===
Since the 1986 AGM the local businessman Sven Hotz took over as chairman and patron of the club. He had a successful property management company and had been vice-president of the club for the previous two years. The Austrian Hermann Stessl remained the first team head coach. The FCZ first team competed in this years domestic first-tier 1987–88 Nationalliga A and they competed in 1987–88 Swiss Cup. The team had not qualified for the UEFA European tournaments and they did not enter the Intertoto Cup.

Toward the end of September, after a bad start to the season and a string of defeats, Stessl was sacked. Friedhelm Konietzka was appointed as head coach in the hope that he could quide the team from the relegation area.

== Players ==
The following is the list of the FCZ first team squad this season. It also includes players that were in the squad the day the domestic league season started, on 8 August 1987, but subsequently left the club after that date.

Note: Flags indicate national team as defined under FIFA eligibility rules; some limited exceptions apply. Players may hold more than one non-FIFA nationality.

| No. | Pos. | Nation | Player |
|---|---|---|---|
| — | GK | SUI | Stefan Knutti (league games: 23) |
| — | GK | SUI | Patrick Tornare (league games: 13) |
| — | DF | SUI | Salvatore Andracchio (league games: 33) |
| — | DF | SUI | Renato Hächler (league games: 15) |
| — | DF | SUI | Christian Hedinger (league games: 21) |
| — | DF | SUI | Ruedi Landolt (league games: 34) |
| — | DF | SUI | Heinz Lüdi (league games: 3) |
| — | DF | SUI | Daniel Perisset (league games: 7) |
| — | DF | NZL | Shane Rufer (league games: 33) |
| — | DF | SUI | Peter Stoll (league games: 10) |
| — | DF | SUI | Beat Studer (league games: 6) |
| — | DF | SUI | Mario Uccella (league games: 13) |
| — | MF | CZE | Jan Berger (league games: 14) |
| — | MF | SUI | Thomas Bickel (league games: 33) |
| — | MF | SUI | Marcel Gamper (league games: 2) |
| — | MF | SUI | Urs Jakob Huber (league games: 2) |

| No. | Pos. | Nation | Player |
|---|---|---|---|
| — | MF | SUI | Roger Kundert (league games: 26) |
| — | MF | ITA | Marco Mautone (league games: 1) |
| — | MF | SUI | Michael Mazenauer (league games: 1) |
| — | MF | SUI | Salvatore Paradiso (league games: 9) |
| — | MF | SUI | Stefan Schlumpf (league games: 17) |
| — | MF | SUI | Norbert Sonderegger (league games: 5) |
| — | MF | SUI | Marcel Stoob (league games: 20) |
| — | MF | SUI | Roger Stoop (league games: 5) |
| — | MF | SUI | Jürg Studer (league games: 30) |
| — | MF | SWE | Jonas Thern (league games: 5) |
| — | MF | SUI | Dragan Vojnovic (league games: 1) |
| — | FW | SUI | Massimo Alliata (league games: 3) |
| — | FW | ENG | John Linford (league games: 11) |
| — | FW | ITA | Salvatore Romano (league games: 29) |
| — | FW | TUR | Ercüment Şahin (league games: 15) |
| — | FW | GER | Wolfgang Vöge (league games: 13) |

Players who left the squad

The following is the list of the FCZ first team players that left the squad during the previous season or in the off-season, before the new domestic season began.

Note: Flags indicate national team as defined under FIFA eligibility rules; some limited exceptions apply. Players may hold more than one non-FIFA nationality.

| No. | Pos. | Nation | Player |
|---|---|---|---|
| — | GK | SUI | Karl Grob (to Biel-Bienne) |
| — | DF | SUI | Urs Fischer (to St. Gallen) |
| — | DF | SUI | Roland Häusermann (to Wettingen) |
| — | MF | AUT | Andreas Gretschnig (to Wiener Sport-Club) |

| No. | Pos. | Nation | Player |
|---|---|---|---|
| — | MF | SUI | Urs Kühni (to Aarau) |
| — | FW | SUI | Adilson de Almeida (to Grenchen) |
| — | FW | SUI | Antonio Paradiso (to Chiasso) |
| — | FW | SUI | Walter Pellegrini (to Bellinzona) |
| — | FW | NZL | Wynton Rufer (to Aarau) |

== Results ==
Legend

Win Draw Loss Postponed

=== Nationalliga A ===
==== Qualification phase ====
| 8 August 1987 Round 1 | Lausanne-Sport | 3–1 | Zürich | Olympique de la Pontaise, Lausanne |
| 20:00 | Antognoni 43' (1:0); Tachet 71' (2:1); Thychosen 83' (3:1) | FCZ summary | 62' (1:1) J. Studer; (yellow card) J. Studer | Attendance: 6,800; Referee: (Switzerland) Franz Gächter (Aarau, Suhr, Aargau) |

| 12 August 1987 Round 2 | Zürich | 0–2 | Xamax | Letzigrund, Zürich |
| 20:00 | Kundert (yellow card); Andracchio (yellow card); Berger (yellow card) | FCZ summary | 47' (1:0) van der Gijp; 56' (2:0) Mottiez; (yellow card) Kaltaveridis | Attendance: 8,300; Referee: (Switzerland) Freddy Philippoz, Sion |

| 15 August 1987 Round 3 | Aarau | 2–2 | Zürich | Stadion Brügglifeld, Aarau |
| 20:00 | Nazar 22' (1:0); Wassmer 36' (2:0); Schär (yellow card) 75' | FCZ summary | (yellow card) 14' Andracchio; 46' (2:1) J. Studer; 85' (2:2) Rufer | Attendance: 8,000; Referee: (Switzerland) Sangsue (Reconvillier) |

| 22 August 1987 Round 4 | Zürich | 3–0 | Sion | Letzigrund, Zürich |
| 20:00 | Kundert 61' (1:0); Vöge 84' (2:0); Romano 88' (3:0); Rufer (yellow card); Landolt (yellow card) | FCZ summary | (yellow card) Débonnaire | Attendance: 4,300; Referee: (Switzerland) Serge Muhmenthaler (Grenchen) |
Note: 250th league appearance for Rudolf Landolt

| 29 August 1987 Round 5 | Bellinzona | 1–2 | Zürich | Stadio Comunale, Bellinzona |
| 20:00 | Türkyilmaz 47' (1:0); Schär (yellow card) | FCZ summary | 48' (1:1) Romano; 53' (1:2) Bickel; (yellow card) Romano; (yellow card) Landolt | Attendance: 5,000; Referee: (Switzerland) Philippe Mercier (Pully) |

| 2 September 1987 Round 6 | Zürich | 0–1 | Grasshopper Club | Letzigrund, Zürich |
| 20:00 | Kundert (yellow card); J. Studer (yellow card); Landolt (yellow card) | FCZ summary | 68' (0:1) Paulo César; (yellow card) Gren; (yellow card) Sforza; (yellow card) Ponte | Attendance: 11,800; Referee: (Switzerland) Bruno Galler (Kirchdorf, Bern and Untersiggenthal) |

| 5 September 1987 Round 7 | Zürich | 0–1 | Servette | Letzigrund, Zürich |
| 20:00 | Andracchio (yellow card) 69' | FCZ summary | 29' (0:1) Besnard; (yellow card) 62' Grossenbacher | Attendance: 3,800; Referee: (Switzerland) Daniel Roduit Sion |

| 8 September 1987 Round 8 | Young Boys | 1–1 | Zürich | Wankdorf Stadium, Bern |
| 20:00 | Weber (yellow card) 29' (Kundert) 37' (o.g.); Hächler (yellow card) 44' (yellow-red card) 70' | FCZ summary | 9' (0:1) Vöge; (yellow card) 54' Stoop; (red card) 72' Kundert | Attendance: 8,000; Referee: (Switzerland) Renzo Peduzzi (Roveredo) |

| 12 September 1987 Round 9 | Basel | 5–4 | Zürich | St. Jakob Stadium, Basel |
| 20:00 | Steiner 4' (1:0); Steiner 24' (2:2); Nadig 35' (3:2); Thoma 57' (4:2); Thoma 82' (5:3) | FCZ summary Summary | 9' (1:1) Landolt; (yellow card) 67' Romano; 15' (1:2) Vöge; 78' (4:3) Andracchio; 86' (5:4) Romano; (yellow card) 90' Paradiso | Attendance: 6,200; Referee: (Switzerland) Kurt Röthlisberger (Suhr, Aargau) |
Note: NLA debut for both Remo Steiner and Ercument Sahin. Corners: 0:2

| 19 September 1987 Round 10 | Zürich | 1–3 | St. Gallen | Letzigrund, Zürich |
| 20:00 | Alliata 58' (1:0); Rufer (yellow card) 65' | FCZ summary | (yellow card) 24' Moscatelli; 61' (1:1) Metzler; 71' (1:2) Zwicker; 81' (1:3) Zwicker | Attendance: 4,900; Referee: (Switzerland) Manfred Schlup, (Grenchen) |

| 23 September 1987 Round 11 | Luzern | 1–0 | Zürich | Stadion Allmend, Luzern |
| 20:00 | Mohr 81' (1:0) | FCZ summary | (yellow card) 30' Stoob; (yellow card) 77' Rufer | Attendance: 6,400; Referee: (Switzerland) Francis Fischer, Arch |

| 26 September 1987 Round 12 | Zürich | 0–0 | Lausanne-Sport | Letzigrund, Zürich |
| 20:00 | | FCZ summary | (yellow card) Milani; (yellow card) Fernandez | Attendance: 3,200; Referee: (Switzerland) Willy Hänni, (Cugy) |

| 3 October 1987 Round 13 | Xamax | 5–2 | Zürich | Stade de la Maladière, Neuchâtel |
| 20:00 | Lüthi 2' (1:0); Lei-Ravello 63' (2:2) van der Gijp 71' (3:2); Hermann 74' (4:2); Sutter 76' (5:2) | FCZ summary | 34' (1:1) Kundert; 49' (1:2) Kundert; (yellow card) Andracchio; (yellow card) Vöge | Attendance: 9,800; Referee: (Switzerland) Rolf Blattmann (Zeiningen) |
Note: 70th minute: Wolfgang Vöge left the field with a broken leg, which would later mean that he had to end his active career.

| 10 October 1987 Round 14 | Zürich | 2–0 | Aarau | Letzigrund, Zürich |
| 20:00 | J. Studer 49' (1:0); Romano 71' (2:0); Landolt (yellow card) | FCZ summary FCA summary | (yellow card) Rindlisbacher; (yellow card) Wyss | Attendance: 5,200; Referee: (Switzerland) Marcel Despland (Yverdon-les-Bains) |

| 13 October 1987 Round 15 | Sion | 2–0 | Zürich | Stade Tourbillon, Sion |
| 20:00 | Brigger 10' (1:0); Bonvin 70' (2:0) | FCZ summary | (yellow card) Balet; (yellow card) Bregy | Attendance: 4,500; Referee: (Germany) Manfred Neuner (Leimen) |

| 24 October 1987 Round 16 | Zürich | 4–2 | Bellinzona | Letzigrund, Zürich |
| | Alliata 7' (1:0); Bickel 33' (2:2); Hächler 51' (3:2); Kundert 76' (4:2); Linford (yellow card) | FCZ summary | 18' (1:1) Aeby; 28' (1:2) Zbinden; (yellow card) Degiovannini; (yellow card) Jakubec; (yellow card) Zbinden | Attendance: 2,800; Referee: (Switzerland) Serge Muhmenthaler (Grenchen) |

| 31 October 1987 Round 17 | Grasshopper Club | 1–0 | Zürich | Hardturm, Zürich |
| 17:30 | Ponte 26' (1:0); Egli (yellow card) 39'; Brunner (yellow card) 68' | FCZ summary | (yellow card) 39' Linford | Attendance: 10,000; Referee: (Switzerland) Bruno Klötzli (Bévilard) |

| 7 November 1987 Round 18 | Servette | 2–1 | Zürich | Charmilles Stadium, Geneva |
| 17:30 | Eriksen 20' (1:0); Eriksen 31' (2:0) | FCZ summary | 36' (2:1) Linford; (yellow card) B. Studer; (yellow card) Linford | Attendance: 4,500; Referee: (Switzerland) Franz Gächter (Aarau, Suhr, Aargau) |

| 22 November 1987 Round 19 | Zürich | 2–3 | Young Boys | Letzigrund, Zürich |
| 14:30 | Hächler (yellow card) 18'; Landolt 25' (1:1); Linford 32' (2:1); Stoob (yellow card) 38' (yellow-red card) 66' | FCZ summary | 5' (0:1) Jeitziner; Jeitziner (yellow card) 30'; 37' (2:2) Zuffi; (yellow card) 56' Fimian; 83' (2:3) Sutter | Attendance: 4,200; Referee: (Switzerland) Manfred Schlup, (Grenchen) |

| 28 November 1987 Round 20 | Zürich | 0–4 | Basel | Letzigrund, Zürich |
| 14:30 | Rufer (yellow card) 36' | FCZ summary FCB summary | 12' (0:1) Nadig; 37' (pen. 0:2) Knup; (yellow card) 51' Bützer; 63' (0:3) Knup; 71' (0:4) Knup; (yellow card) 81' Hauser | Attendance: 2,700; Referee: (Switzerland) Kurt Röthlisberger (Suhr) |

| 6 December 1987 Round 21 | St. Gallen | 4–1 | Zürich | Espenmoos, St. Gallen |
| 14:30 | Hegi 40' (1:1); Gämperle 54' (2:1); Zwicker 80' (3:1); Zwicker 86' (4:1); Metzler (yellow card) | FCZ summary | 19' (0:1) Romano; (yellow card) Linford | Attendance: 7,500; Referee: (Switzerland) Renzo Peduzzi (Roveredo) |

| 13 December 1987 Round 22 | Zürich | 0–3 | Luzern | Letzigrund, Zürich |
| 14:30 | B. Studer (yellow card) 10' | FCZ summary | (yellow card) 40' R. Müller; 60' (0:1) R. Müller; (yellow card) 62' Burri; 77' (0:2) M. Müller; 84' (0:3) Bernaschina | Attendance: 10,500; Referee: (Switzerland) Peter Bochsler (Basel) |

==== Qualification table ====
| Pos | Team | Pld | W | D | L | GF | GA | GD | Pts | Qualification |
|---|---|---|---|---|---|---|---|---|---|---|
| 1 | Xamax | 22 | 13 | 5 | 4 | 53 | 28 | +25 | 44 | Advance to championship round halved points (rounded up) as bonus |
| 2 | Grasshopper Club | 22 | 12 | 6 | 4 | 30 | 16 | +14 | 42 | Advance to championship round halved points (rounded up) as bonus |
| 3 | Young Boys | 22 | 7 | 12 | 3 | 37 | 28 | +9 | 33 | Advance to championship round halved points (rounded up) as bonus |
| 4 | Aarau | 22 | 9 | 7 | 6 | 28 | 24 | +4 | 34 | Advance to championship round halved points (rounded up) as bonus |
| 5 | St. Gallen | 22 | 9 | 5 | 8 | 28 | 27 | +1 | 32 | Advance to championship round halved points (rounded up) as bonus |
| 6 | Luzern | 22 | 7 | 9 | 6 | 30 | 29 | +1 | 30 | Advance to championship round halved points (rounded up) as bonus |
| 7 | Servette | 22 | 8 | 7 | 7 | 32 | 31 | +1 | 31 | Advance to championship round halved points (rounded up) as bonus |
| 8 | Lausanne-Sport | 22 | 8 | 7 | 7 | 39 | 39 | 0 | 31 | Advance to championship round halved points (rounded up) as bonus |
| 9 | Sion | 22 | 8 | 6 | 8 | 42 | 36 | +6 | 30 | Continue to promotion/relegation round |
| 10 | Bellinzona | 22 | 3 | 8 | 11 | 25 | 38 | −13 | 17 | Continue to promotion/relegation round |
| 11 | Basel | 22 | 4 | 5 | 13 | 27 | 55 | −28 | 17 | Continue to promotion/relegation round |
| 12 | Zürich | 22 | 4 | 3 | 15 | 26 | 46 | −20 | 15 | Continue to promotion/relegation round |

Source: rsssf.com
Rules for classification: 1) Points; 2) Goal difference; 3) Goals scored; 4) Head-to-head points; 5) Away goals scored; 6) Draw.

==== Promotion/relegation group B ====
| 6 March 1988 Round 1 | Zürich | 3–1 | Martigny-Sports | Letzigrund, Zürich |
| 14:30 | Linford 2' (1:0); Thern 10' (2:0); J. Studer 85' (3:1); Rufer (yellow card); Kundert (yellow card) | FCZ summary | 78' (2:1) Marchand | Attendance: 1,500; Referee: (Switzerland) Bruno Klötzli (Bévilard) |
Note: Pitch partly covered with snow.

| 20 March 1988 Round 2 | Chênois | 3–2 | Zürich | Stade des Trois-Chêne, Thônex |
| 14:30 | Navarro 7' (1:0); Celso da Silva 35' (2:0); Oranci 69' (3:2); Oranci (yellow card) | FCZ summary | 43' (2:1) Linford; 63' (2:2) Landolt; (yellow card) Hedinger | Attendance: 1,700; Referee: (Switzerland) Peter Bochsler (Basel) |

| 22 March 1988 Round 3 | Zürich | 0–2 | Lugano | Letzigrund, Zürich |
| 20:00 | | FCZ summary | 75' (0:1) Pelosi; 83' (0:2) Colombo | Attendance: 2,200; Referee: (Switzerland) Rudolf Michlig (Ostermundigen) |

| 30 March 1988 Round 4 | Zürich | 2–3 | Sion | Letzigrund, Zürich |
| 20:00 | Bickel 60' (1:3); Şahin 83' (2:3); Landolt (yellow card) | FCZ summary | 7' (0:1) Brigger; 24' (0:2) Brigger; 42' (0:3) Cina | Attendance: 2,300; Referee: (Switzerland) Philippe Mercier (Pully) |

| 4 April 1988 Round 5 | Chiasso | 5–3 | Zürich | Stadio Comunale Riva IV, Chiasso |
| 14:30 | Lurati 23' (1:0); Leva 36' (2:0); Bordoli 79' (3:3); Lurati 88' (4:3); Leva 90' (5:3) | FCZ summary | 39' (2:1) Bickel; 53' (o.g.) (Sordelli); 72' (2:3) Schlumpf | Attendance: 600; Referee: (Switzerland) Marcel Despland (Yverdon-les-Bains) |

| 9 April 1988 Round 6 | Locarno | 0–0 | Zürich | Stadio del Lido, Locarno |
| 20:00 | Giani (yellow card) | FCZ summary | (yellow card) Perisset; (yellow card) Thern | Attendance: 2,600; Referee: (Switzerland) Charles-Henri Morex (Bex) |

| 16 April 1988 Round 7 | Zürich | 2–0 | Grenchen | Letzigrund, Zürich |
| 20:00 | Kundert 31' (1:0); Bickel 56' (2:0) | FCZ summary | | Attendance: 1,200; Referee: (Switzerland) Peter Bochsler (Basel) |

| 24 April 1988 Round 8 | Martigny-Sports | 4–1 | Zürich | Stade d'Octodure, Martigny |
| 14:30 | Zwygart 20' (1:0); Moulin 31' (2:0); Bregy 51' (3:0); Ben Brahim 72' (4:1) | FCZ summary | (yellow card) 36' (yellow-red card) 36' Andracchio; 61' (3:1) Şahin | Attendance: 1,200; Referee: (Switzerland) Philippe Mercier (Pully) |

| 30 April 1988 Round 9 | Zürich | 1–2 | Chênois | Letzigrund, Zürich |
| 20:00 | Landolt 24' (1:1) | FCZ summary | 5' (o.g.) (Stoob); 83' (1:2) Oranci | Attendance: 1,000; Referee: (Switzerland) Paul-Louis Christe (Lausanne) |

| 3 May 1988 Round 10 | Lugano | 2–1 | Zürich | Cornaredo, Lugano |
| 20:00 | Elia 30' (1:0); Gorter 73' (2:0) | FCZ summary | (yellow card) 62' Uccella; (yellow card) 65' Landolt; 84' (2:1) J. Studer | Attendance: 2,500; Referee: (Switzerland) Bruno Klötzli (Bévilard) |
Note: At the start of the game: a minute's silence in memory of the late Louis Maurer, who had coached both teams during his career.

| 7 May 1988 Round 11 | Sion | 6–1 | Zürich | Stade Tourbillon, Sion |
| 20:00 | Brigger 6' (1:0); Carlos Manuel 21' (pen.); Cina 31' (3:1); Brigger 40' (4:1); Cina 43' (5:1); Brigger 57' (6:1) | FCZ summary | 8' (1:1) Romano | Attendance: 6,000; Referee: (Switzerland) Arturo Martino (Neukirch an der Thur) |

| 13 May 1988 Round 12 | Zürich | 3–2 | Chiasso | Letzigrund, Zürich |
| 20:00 | Şahin 7' (1:0); Bickel (112:0); Bickel 61' (3:1) | FCZ summary | 42' (o.g.) (Stoob); 77' (3:2) Neumann | Attendance: 800; Referee: (Switzerland) Francis Fischer (Arch) |

| 19 May 1988 Round 13 | Zürich | 3–1 | Locarno | Letzigrund, Zürich |
| 20:00 | Landolt 23' (1:0); Romano 41' (2:0); Stoob (yellow card) 54'; Romano 89' (3:1) | FCZ summary | (yellow card) 48' Giani; 88' (2:1) Kurz | Attendance: 700; Referee: (Switzerland) Daniel Roduit (Sion) |

| 24 May 1988 Round 14 | Grenchen | 3–2 | Zürich | Stadion Brühl, Grenchen |
| 20:00 | Lüthi 61' (1:0); Fluri 24' (2:1); Ciołek 71' (3:2) | FCZ summary | 8' (1:1) Bickel; (yellow card) 32' Lüdi; 37' (2:2) J. Studer | Attendance: 1,100; Referee: (Switzerland) Bruno Galler (Kirchdorf, Bern) |

==== Final group table ====
| Pos | Team | Pld | W | D | L | GF | GA | GD | Pts | Qualification |
|---|---|---|---|---|---|---|---|---|---|---|
| 1 | Lugano | 14 | 13 | 0 | 1 | 47 | 15 | +32 | 26 | Promotion to Nationalliga A 1988–89 |
| 2 | Sion | 14 | 11 | 1 | 2 | 49 | 14 | +35 | 23 | Remain in Nationalliga A 1988–89 |
| 3 | Grenchen | 14 | 7 | 1 | 6 | 27 | 24 | +3 | 15 | Remain in Nationalliga B 1988–89 |
| 4 | Chênois | 14 | 6 | 2 | 6 | 21 | 30 | −9 | 14 | Remain in Nationalliga B 1988–89 |
| 5 | Chiasso | 14 | 5 | 1 | 8 | 21 | 34 | −13 | 11 | Remain in Nationalliga B 1988–89 |
| 6 | Zürich | 14 | 4 | 1 | 9 | 24 | 34 | −10 | 9 | Relegation to Nationalliga B 1988–89 |
| 7 | Martigny-Sports | 14 | 3 | 2 | 9 | 16 | 37 | −21 | 8 | Remain in Nationalliga B 1988–89 |
| 8 | Locarno | 14 | 1 | 4 | 9 | 16 | 33 | −17 | 6 | Remain in Nationalliga B 1988–89 |

Source: rsssf.com
Rules for classification: 1) Points; 2) Goal difference; 3) Goals scored; 4) Head-to-head points; 5) Away goals scored; 6) Draw.

=== Swiss Cup ===
| 18 November 1987 Round 3 | Chiasso | 0–4 | Zürich | Stadio Comunale Riva IV, Chiasso |
| | Sordelli (yellow card) | FCZ summary | 15' (0:1) Bickel; 37' (pen.) Bickel; 60' (0:3) Bickel; 87' (0:4) Kundert; (yellow card) Uccella | Attendance: 1,200; Referee: (Switzerland) Georges Sandoz (Corcelles-Cormondrèche, Neuchâtel) |
Note: Chiasso played the 1987/88 season in the NLB (second-tier).

| 13 March 1988 Round 4 | Zürich | 6–1 | FC Dübendorf | Letzigrund, Zürich |
| | Linford 21' (1:0); Kundert 36' (pen.); Studer 54' (3:0); Rufer (yellow card) 54'; Perisset 68' (4:0); Studer 74' (5:0); Bickel 80' (6:1) | FCZ summary | 76' (5:1) Metschl | Attendance: 1,100; Referee: (Switzerland) Bruno Galler (Kirchdorf, Bern) |
Note: Dübendorf played the 1987/88 season in the 1. Liga (third-tier).

| 26 March 1988 Round 5 | Lausanne-Sport | 0–1 | Zürich | Olympique de la Pontaise, Lausanne |
| 20:00 | | FCZ summary | 41' (0:1) Bickel | Attendance: 2.200; Referee: (Switzerland) Kurt Röthlisberger (Suhr) |

| 19 April 1988 Quarter-final | Zürich | 1–2 | Grasshopper Club | Letzigrund, Zürich |
| 20:00 | Hedinger (yellow card) 40'; Şahin 53' (1:0); Stoob (yellow card) 88' | FCZ summary | (yellow card) 60' Egli; 67' (1:1) Gren; 76' (o.g.) (Uccella) | Attendance: 8,100; Referee: (Switzerland) Manfred Schlup (Grenchen) |

=== Friendly matches ===
==== Pre-season ====
| 11 July 1987 Exhibition game | FC Albisrieden | 3–10 | Zürich | Letzigrund trainings pitch, Zürich |
| | Güntensperger 64' (1:5); Bouli 79' (pen- 2:8); 87' (3:10) | FCZ summary | 6' (0:1) Vöge; 12' (0:2) Romano; 15' (0:3) Vöge; 20' (0:4) Bickel; 22' (0:5) Kundert; 67' (1:6) Vöge; 68' (1:7) Andracchio; 72' (1:8) Romano; 81' (2:9) Uccella; 82' (2:10) J. Studer | Referee: (Switzerland) B. Neukom (Zürich) |

| 14 July 1987 Exhibition game | SSV Ulm | 3–2 | Zürich | Ulm |
| | (1:2) (2:2) (2:3) | FCZ summary | (0:1) Berger (0:2) J. Studer |

| 18 July 1987 Exhibition game | Zürich | 5–0 | Rangers | Letzigrund, Zürich |
| | Bickel 11' (1:0); Romano 27' (2:0); Bickel 53' (3:0); Berger 71' (4:0); Vöge 90' (5:0); Hächler (yellow card) | FCZ summary | (yellow card) McGregor; (yellow card) Roberts | Attendance: 1,200; Referee: (Switzerland) Kurt Röthlisberger (Suhr, Aargau) |

| 22 July 1987 Exhibition game | Amateur selection Sindelfingen | 1–7 | Zürich | Darmsheim, Sindelfingen |
| | Goal | FCZ summary | Vöge; Vöge; Vöge; J. Studer; J. Studer; Berger; Hächler |

| 25 July 1987 Exhibition game | Freiburger FC | 2–2 | Zürich | Möslestadion, Freiburg im Breisgau |
| | Goal | FCZ summary | Goal |

| 29 July 1987 Exhibition game | Zürich | 2–1 | Iraklis F.C. (Thessaloniki) | Letzigrund, Zürich |
| | Vöge 31' (1:1); Romano 60' (2:1) | FCZ summary | 30' (0:1) Maloumidis | Attendance: 700; Referee: (Switzerland) Marino Paggiola (Appenzell) |

| 1 August 1987 Exhibition game | FC Bülach | 0–16 | Zürich | Stadion Erachfeld, Bülach |
| | | FCZ summary | Vöge; Vöge; Vöge; Vöge; Vöge; J. Studer; J. Studer; J. Studer; J. Studer; Bickel; Bickel; Bickel; Bickel; Romano; Romano; Berger | Attendance: 550; Referee: (Switzerland) Dossenbach (Effretikon) |

| 8 August 1987 Exhibition game | FC Töss (Winterthur) | 0–12 | Zürich | Reitplatz, Winterthur |
| | | FCZ summary | (0:1) Stoop (0:2) Romano (0:3) J. Studer (0:4) J. Studer (0:5) J. Studer (0:6) Andracchio (0:7) Bickel (0:8) Vöge (0:9) Vöge (0:10) Andracchio (0:11) Bickel (0:12) Landolt | Attendance: 200 |

==== Winter break ====
| 21 January 1988 Exhibition game | Olhanense | 1–1 | Zürich | Olhão, Algarve |
| | 79' (1:1) | FCZ summary | 78' (0:1) J. Studer |
Note: First match during the training camp in Portugal. Olhanense played in the Portuguese second division in 1987/88.

| 28 January 1988 Exhibition game | Farense | 1–1 | Zürich | Faro, Algarve |
| | 85' (1:1) | FCZ summary | (0:1) Thern |
Note: Second match during the training camp in Portugal. In 1987/88 Farense played in the Portuguese First Division.

| 13 February 1988 Exhibition game | SC Zug | 2–2 | Zürich | Allmend, Zug |
| | Goal | FCZ summary | Goal |
Note: The match was played on a difficult-to-play and heavily sanded pitch.

| 14 February 1988 Exhibition game | Zürich | 0–2 | Winterthur | Letzigrund trainings pitch, Zürich |
| | | FCZ summary | (o.g.) (B. Studer) |

| 20 February 1988 Exhibition game | FC Tresa | 2–4 | Zürich |
| | Goal | FCZ summary | Goal |

| 21 February 1988 Exhibition game | FC Ascona | 0–0 | Zürich |
| | | FCZ summary |

| 27 February 1988 Exhibition game | Chiasso | 2–1 | Zürich | Stadio Comunale, Chiasso |
| | Bordoli (1:0); Leva (2:0) | FCZ summary | (2:1) Romano |

| 28 February 1988 Exhibition game | FC Mendrisio | 1–3 | Zürich | Centro Sportivo Comunale, Mendrisio |
| | Goal | FCZ summary | 3' (o.g.); Schlumpf; Schlumpf |

| 1 March 1988 Exhibition game | Bellinzona | 3–0 | Zürich | Stadio Comunale, Bellinzona |
| | Fregno (1:0); Türkyilmaz (2:0); Jakubec (3:0) | FCZ summary |

== Sources ==
- dbFCZ Homepage
- Switzerland 1987–88 at RSSSF

| Preceded by 1986–87 | FC Zürich seasons | Succeeded by 1988–89 |
