= 1987–88 FC Basel season =

FC Basel
1987–88 season
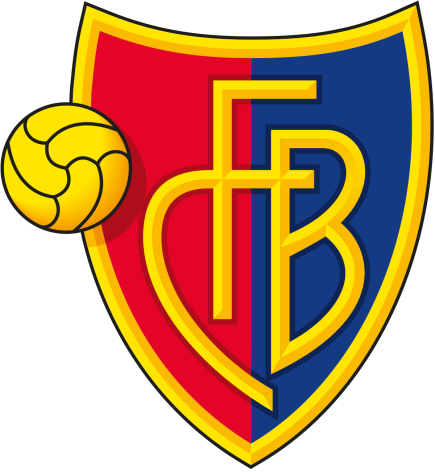
- Chairman: Charles Röthlisberger
- Manager: Urs Siegenthaler
- Ground: St. Jakob Stadium, Basel
- Nationalliga A, first stage: 11th of 12
- Promotion/relegation: 5th of 8, relegated
- Swiss Cup: Round 3
- Top goalscorer: League: Peter Nadig (11); All: Peter Nadig (11)
- Highest home attendance: 10,000 on 19 September 1987 vs. Luzern
- Lowest home attendance: 1,400 on 19 May 1988 vs. Old Boys
- Average home league attendance: 5,536 and 4,357

The Fussball Club Basel 1893 1987–88 season was their 94th season since the club's foundation. It was their 42nd consecutive season in the top flight of Swiss football (Nationalliga A) since they achieved promotion in the 1945–46 season. FC Basel played their home games in the St. Jakob Stadium.

== Overview ==
=== Pre-season ===
Charles Röthlisberger was the club's newly appointed chairman. He was the club's 31st chairman in their history and he took over from Peter Max Sutter.

Following the poor previous season, as the team only escaped relegation in the play-out round, Helmut Benthaus retired as head coach and there were also a number of players who left the club. Former Swiss international midfielder René Botteron retired from active football. German former international Gerd Strack returned to Germany to play for Fortuna Düsseldorf. Another German player also moved to Germany, Thomas Süss moved on to play for Karlsruher SC. French player Jean-Pierre François moved back to France to play for AS Saint-Étienne. Also Fredy Grossenbacher and Marco Schällibaum both moved to Servette, André Ladner moved to Lugano and Erni Maissen transferred to Young Boys. Further reserve goalkeeper Patrick Mäder moved on to Baden and Luiz Gonçalo moved on to Old Boys.

Urs Siegenthaler was appointed as new first team coach and because 11 players left the squad he had to build a new team. But the club was suffering financial difficulties and there was no money to spend. However, one interesting transfer was that of Scottish Gordon Smith coming from Admira Wacker. Another interesting transfer was that of German Uwe Dittus from FC Winterslag. Another two experienced players were Frank Eggeling joined from Grenchen and Ruedi Zahner from Aarau. All other new players were youngsters, goalkeeper Bernard Pulver joined from lower tier FC Bern, Peter Bernauer from German team SV 08 Laufenburg, Remo Steiner from local club FC Aesch, Ralph Thoma from local club FC Rheinfelden, Mathias Wehrli from local club FC Laufen. Six players were brought up from the youth team. These being Philipp Baumberger, Massimo Ceccaroni, Bernd Schramm, Adrian Sedlo, Fotios Karapetsas and Patrick Rahmen.

Another interesting transfer was that of Varadaraju Sundramoorthy from Singapore FA. Sundramoorthy became only the second player from Singapore to play in Europe when he signed during the winter break and one of the first Asian players to play in Switzerland. He is widely touted as one of the country's most skillful and talented footballers ever. Sundramoorthy had problems adapting to European football, he did not have the stamina and strength to play the entire 90 minutes and manager Siegenthaler used him as a substitute because he had the skills to decide a match.

=== Domestic league ===
The Swiss Football Association (SFV) had changed the form of the domestic league for this season. The number of teams in the Nationalliga A had been reduced from 16 to 12 and in the Nationalliga B had been increased from 16 to 24, these were divided into two regional groups. The top eight teams after the first stage would compete the second stage as championship group. The last four teams would compete the second stage in two promotion/relegation groups with the top six teams from each of the two Nationalliga B groups. Basel started the season badly, losing the first five league games straight off, conceding 17 goals, scoring just three. In the third round on 15 August they were defeated 1–9 by Xamax. Up until today this is still the highest score defeat that Basel have suffered in their domestic league history. Xamax manager at that time was Gilbert Gress. The goal scorers were 2x Robert Lüthi, 2x Robert Lei-Ravello, 2x Beat Sutter, 2x Heinz Hermann and Alain Geiger. The only goal for Basel was scored by Ralph Thoma.

The team never recovered from the bad start and even lost seven of the eleven return games. They ended the qualifying stage of the championship with just 13 points in 11th position. This meant that they had to play in one of the two promotion/relegation groups. Despite a good start in this phase, they won their first three matches, they were defeated by Bellinzona and then by Wettingen. Basel thus lost contact to these two teams in the top two positions in the league table. The first two places would qualify for next seasons top flight. In their last six games Basel could not achieve a single victory and therefore they slipped to fifth position in the table and were relegated to the Nationalliga B.

Xamax won the Swiss championship, second and third placed Servette and Aarau qualified for the 1988–89 UEFA Cup.

=== Swiss Cup ===
In the Swiss Cup, FCB started in round 3 and were drawn against local rivals Old Boys. The game ended with a 1–2 defeat and therefore the cup season was ended much earlier than expected. In the final Grasshopper Club won the cup with a 2–0 victory over Schaffhausen and thus qualified for the 1988–89 Cup Winners' Cup.

== Players ==
Note: Flags indicate national team as defined under FIFA eligibility rules; some limited exceptions apply. Players may hold more than one non-FIFA nationality.

No.	Pos.	Nation	Player
1	GK	SUI	Bernard Pulver (from FC Bern)
1	GK	SUI	Urs Suter
2	DF	SUI	Philipp Baumberger (from youth team)
3	DF	GER	Peter Bernauer (from SV 08 Laufenburg)
4	MF	SUI	Stefan Bützer
5	DF	SUI	Massimo Ceccaroni (from youth team)
6	FW	GER	Frank Eggeling (from Grenchen)
7	DF	SUI	Markus Füri
8	DF	SUI	Fabio Ghisoni
9	DF	SUI	Bruno Hänni
10	FW	GER	Thomas Hauser
11	DF	SUI	Dominique Herr
12	DF	SUI	Markus Hodel
13	FW	SUI	Adrian Knup

No.	Pos.	Nation	Player
14	MF	ESP	Enrique Mata
15	MF	SUI	Peter Nadig
16	MF	GER	Bernd Schramm (from youth team)
17	FW	SUI	Remo Steiner (from FC Aesch)
18	FW	SUI	Ralph Thoma (from FC Rheinfelden)
19	FW	SUI	Mathias Wehrli (from FC Laufen)
20	MF	SUI	Ruedi Zahner (from Aarau)
21	MF	SCO	Gordon Smith (from Admira Wacker)
—	MF	GER	Uwe Dittus (from FC Winterslag)
—	DF	GER	Adrian Sedlo (from youth team)
—	MF	GRE	Fotios Karapetsas (from youth team)
—	MF	SUI	Stephan Schaub (new)
—	FW	SGP	Varadaraju Sundramoorthy (from Singapore FA)
—	FW	SUI	Patrick Rahmen (from youth team)

Players who left the squad

Note: Flags indicate national team as defined under FIFA eligibility rules; some limited exceptions apply. Players may hold more than one non-FIFA nationality.

No.	Pos.	Nation	Player
—	GK	SUI	Dominik Leder
—	GK	SUI	Patrick Mäder (to Baden)
—	DF	SUI	André Ladner (to Lugano)
—	DF	GER	Gerd Strack (to Fortuna Düsseldorf)
—	DF	SUI	Fredy Grossenbacher (to Servette)

No.	Pos.	Nation	Player
—	DF	SUI	Marco Schällibaum (to Servette)
—	MF	SUI	Erni Maissen (to Young Boys)
—	MF	GER	Thomas Süss (to Karlsruher SC)
—	FW	FRA	Jean-Pierre François (to AS Saint-Étienne)
—	FW	SUI	Luiz Gonçalo (to Old Boys)
—	MF	SUI	René Botteron (retired)

== Results ==
Legend

Win Draw Loss Postponed

=== Friendly matches ===
==== Pre- and mid-season ====
22 July 1987 Uhrencup semi-final	Young Boys (Switzerland)	4–1	(Switzerland) Basel	Stadion Brühl, Grenchen
19:00	A. Sutter 12' (1:0); A. Sutter 57' (2:0); A. Sutter 68' (3:0); Zuffi 86' (4:1)	Summary	69' (o.g. 3:1) Hohl	Attendance: 1,900; Referee: (Switzerland) Serge Muhmenthaler (Grenchen)

25 July 1987 Uhrencup match for 3rd place	Basel (Switzerland)	2–3	(Poland) KS Gornik Zabrze	Stadion Brühl, Grenchen
17:00	Knup 31' (1:1); Eggeling 84' (2:2)	Summary	16' (pen. 0:1) Lesnik; 37' (1:2) Cyroń; 86' (2:3) Iwan	Attendance: 1,600; Referee: (Switzerland) Francis Fischer (Arch)r

30 July 1987 Pre-season	FC Klus-Balsthal (Switzerland)	1–5	(Switzerland) Basel	Moos, Balsthal
	Stucki 73' (1:4)	Summary	31' (0:1) Hauser; 42' (0:2) Hauser; 59' (0:3) Hänni; 63' (0:4) Thoma; 84' (1:5) Steiner	Attendance: 500; Referee: (Switzerland) Aurelio Giannini

31 July 1987 Pre-season	Yverdon-Sports (Switzerland)	2–1	(Switzerland) Basel	Stade Municipal, Yverdon
19:00	Mann 35' (1:0); Mann 81' (2:1)	Summary	46' (1:1) Hänni; (penalty missed) 50′ Bützer	Attendance: 700; Referee: (Switzerland) Michel Barbezat

1 August 1987 Pre-season	Aarau (Switzerland)	1–0	(Switzerland) Basel	Moos, Balsthal
19:00	Wassmer 46' (1:0)	Summary		Attendance: 500
Note: Aarau substituted Wassmer, Nazar and Rufer in, for Kühni, Wyss and Schär after the break, while Basel played with the same formation throughout.

1 August 1987 Pre-season	Servette (Switzerland)	3–2	(Switzerland) Basel	Stade municipal, Bernex
17:00	Palumbo 4' (1:0); Hasler 26' (2:0); Kok 45+1' (3:0)	Summary	61' (pen. 3:1) Knup; 66' (3:2) Nadig	Attendance: 1,200; Referee: (Switzerland) Claude Gachoud

5 August 1987 Pre-season	Laufen (Switzerland)	1–2	(Switzerland) Basel	Sportplatz Nau, Laufen
19:00	Schneider 2' (1:0)	Summary	28' (1:1) Zahner; 88' (1:2) Eggeling	Attendance: 600; Referee: (Switzerland) André Reck

24 August 1987 Mid-season	Basel (Switzerland)	13–0	(Switzerland) Sport journalists	Landhof, Basel
17:45	Schramm (4x); Bützer (3x); Eggeling (3x); Smith (2x); Hodel (1x)	Summary		Attendance: 200

==== Winter break ====
27 January 1988 Winter break	Basel (Switzerland)	6–3	(Switzerland) Young Boys	St. Jakob Stadium, Basel
18:30	Eggeling 23' (1:2); Eggeling 33' (2:2); Eggeling 43' (3:3); Nadig 51' (4:3); Sundramoorthy 75' (5:3); Nadig 85' (6:3)	Summary	6' (0:1) Nilsson; 13' (0:2) Holmqvist; 40' (2:3) Jeitziner	Attendance: 350; Referee: (Switzerland) Peter Bochsler (Basel)
Note: First game with Sundramoorthy from Singapore

30 January 1988 Winter break	Basel (Switzerland)	4–2	(Switzerland) Grasshopper Club	St. Jakob Stadium, Basel
16:30	Hauser 35' (1:1); Knup 59' (2:1); Knup 76' (3:2); Knup 90+1' (pen. 4:2)	Summary	26' (0:1) Pedrotti; 71' (2:2) Pedrotti	Attendance: 500; Referee: (Switzerland) Willi Rudin (Liestal and Birsfelden)

2 February 1988 Winter break	Basel (Switzerland)	2–1	(Germany) SV Darmstadt 98	St. Jakob Stadium, Basel
	Herr 82' (1:1); Sundramoorthy 85' (2:1)	Summary	11' (pen. 0:1) Künast	Attendance: 400; Referee: (Switzerland) Rolf Blattmann (Zeiningen)

6 February 1988 Winter break	Chiasso (Switzerland)	0–2	(Switzerland) Basel	Stadio Comunale, Chiasso
		Summary	24' (0:1) Dittus; 54' (0:2) Smith	Attendance: 47; Referee: (Switzerland) Flavio Scalena (Montagnola)

12 February 1988 Winter break	FC Ascona (Switzerland)	2–3	(Switzerland) Basel	Stadio Comunale, Ascona
	Rossi 26' (1:2); Sanders 31' (2:2)	Summary	4' (0:1) Knup; 24' (0:2) Sundramoorthy; 37' (2:3) Nadig	Referee: (Switzerland) Marco Raveglia (San Vittore)

14 February 1988 Winter break	Lugano (Switzerland)	3–0	(Switzerland) Basel	Cornaredo, Lugano
	Jensen 11' (1:0); Gorter 25' (2:0); Manfreda 84' (3:0)	Summary		Attendance: 300; Referee: (Switzerland) Francesco Bianchi (Chiasso)

17 February 1988 Winter break	Basel (Switzerland)	1–0	(Germany) Freiburger FC	St. Jakob Stadium, Basel
18:30	Dittus 54' (1:0)	Summary		Attendance: 300; Referee: (Switzerland) Peter Bochsler (Basel)

20 February 1988 Winter break	Basel (Switzerland)	1–0	(Switzerland) FC Dübendorf	St. Jakob Stadium, Basel
16:00	Eggeling 66' (1:0)	Summary	(penalty missed) 27′ Müller	Attendance: 300; Referee: (Switzerland) Willi Rudin (Liestal and Birsfelden)
Note: 27th minute, FCB goalkeeper Urs Suter held the penalty-kick from Müller.

24 February 1988 Winter break	Aarau (Switzerland)	4–1	(Switzerland) Basel	Im Feld, Oftringen
	Lunde 10' (1:0); Schär 56' (2:1); Rufer 76' (3:1); Lunde 80' (4:1)	Summary	38' (1:1) Dittus	Attendance: 73; Referee: (Switzerland) Kurt Röthlisberger (Suhr, Aargau)

=== Nationalliga A ===
==== Qualifying phase matches ====
8 August 1987 Round 1	Aarau	2–0	Basel	Stadion Brügglifeld, Aarau
20:00	Osterwalder (yellow card) 38'; Nazar 39' (1:0); Nazar (yellow card) 52'; Wyss 87' (2:0)	FCB summary FCA summary	(yellow card) 45' Wehrli	Attendance: 7,400; Referee: (Switzerland) Arturo Martino (Neukirch an der Thur)
Note: NLA debuts for Frank Triebold (FCA), Bernard Pulver, Peter Bernauer, Mathias Wehrli and Ralph Thoma (all FCB). Corners: 13:2 (6:1)

12 August 1987 Round 2	Basel	1–2	Lausanne-Sport	St. Jakob Stadium, Basel
20:00	Smith 52' (1:2)	FCB summary	40' (0:1) Chapuisat; 51' (0:2) Thychosen; (yellow card) 88' Schürmann	Attendance: 6,500; Referee: (Switzerland) Daniel Roduit (Sion)
Note: NLA debut for Philipp Baumberger. Very mediocre performance from the referees and linesmen.

15 August 1987 Round 3	Xamax	9–1	Basel	Stade de la Maladière, Neuchâtel
20:00	Lüthi 11' (1:0); Lüthi 12' (2:0); Lei-Ravello 39' (3:0); Sutter 44' (4:0); Sutter 56' (5:0); Lei-Ravello 57' (pen. 6:0); Hermann 81' (7:1); Geiger 84' (8:1); Hermann 86' (9:1)	FCB summary	59' (6:1) Thoma	Attendance: 10,300; Referee: (Switzerland) René Kellenberger (Herisau)
Note: NLA debut for Schramm. Excellent refereeing performance.

22 August 1987 Round 4	Basel	0–1	Grasshopper Club	St. Jakob Stadium, Basel
20:00	Hänni (yellow card) 10'; Bützer (yellow card) 16'	FCB summary	(yellow card) 27' Andermatt; (yellow card) 37' Sforza; 80' (0:1) Andermatt	Attendance: 6,100; Referee: (Switzerland) Freddy Philippoz (Sion)
Note: Corner: 4:5. Former FCB coaches Ernst August Künnecke, Emil Müller and Helmut Benthaus were in the stands. Regarding the referee: Not as good as referee chief Rudolf Scheurer wanted to believe, not as bad as the spectators wanted to see (technically flawless, too lenient in the penalty area, too nitpicky outside the penalty area...).

29 August 1987 Round 5	Sion	3–1	Basel	Stade Tourbillon, Sion
20:00	Bregy 31' (1:0); Rojević 45+1' (2:0); Piffaretti 47' (3:0)	FCB summary	84' (3:1) Knup	Attendance: 5,400; Referee: (Switzerland) Francis Fischer (Arch)
Note: Very good footballing conditions. Corners: 15:2 (9:1).

2 September 1987 Round 6	Basel	1–1	Bellinzona	St. Jakob Stadium, Basel
20:00	Knup 16' (1:0); Hänni (yellow card) 47'	FCB summary	19' (1:1) Türkyilmaz; (yellow card) 37' Meier; (yellow card) 81' Macaé	Attendance: 4,900; Referee: (Switzerland) Bruno Klötzli (Bévilard)
Note: Corner: 6:2 (5:0). Acceptable performance by the referee.

5 September 1987 Round 7	Basel	2–1	St. Gallen	St. Jakob Stadium, Basel
20:00	Nadig 34' (1:0); Hodel (yellow card) 37'; Thoma 45' (2:1); Bützer (yellow card) 50'; Nadig (yellow card) 87'	FCB summary	43' (1:1) Braschler; (yellow card) 61' Zwicker; (yellow card) 68' Rietmann; (yellow card) 87' Piserchia	Attendance: 4,000; Referee: (Switzerland) Marcel Despland (Yverdon-les-Bains)
Note: Corners: 9:4.

8 September 1987 Round 8	Servette	4–0	Basel	Charmilles Stadium, Geneva
20:00	Decastel 32' (1:0); Decastel 33' (2:0); Kok 59' (3:0); Eriksen 73' (4:0)	FCB summary	(yellow card) 27' Hänni	Attendance: 3,700; Referee: (Switzerland) Franz Gächter (Aarau, Suhr, Aargau)
Note: Gächter officiated the game with A-refs Schlup and Süss as linesmen (test for the European Cup match Olympique Marseille-Lokomotive Leipzig) and delivered a flawless performance.

12 September 1987 Round 9	Basel	5–4	Zürich	St. Jakob Stadium, Basel
20:00	Steiner 4' (1:0); Steiner 24' (2:2); Nadig 35' (3:2); Thoma 57' (4:2); Thoma 82' (5:3)	FCZ summary Summary	9' (1:1) Landolt; (yellow card) 67' Romano; 15' (1:2) Vöge; 78' (4:3) Andracchio; 86' (5:4) Romano; (yellow card) 90' Paradiso	Attendance: 6,200; Referee: (Switzerland) Kurt Röthlisberger (Suhr, Aargau)
Note: NLA debut for both Remo Steiner (FCB) and Ercument Sahin (FCZ). Corners: 0:2. The referee delivered a flawless performance, remaining completely calm amidst all the hustle and bustle and whistling in a factual and correct manner.

19 September 1987 Round 10	Basel	3–3	Luzern	St. Jakob Stadium, Basel
20:00	Nadig 47' (1:1); Zahner 51' (2:1); Nadig 55' (3:1)	FCB summary	8' (0:1) R. Müller; 59' (3:2) Fink; 63' (3:3) Birrer	Attendance: 10,000; Referee: (Switzerland) Willy Hänni, (Cugy)

23 September 1987 Round 11	Young Boys	1–1	Basel	Wankdorf Stadium, Bern
20:00	Jeitziner (yellow card) 59'; Zuffi 68' (1:0)	FCB summary	(yellow card) 21' Ghisoni; 82' (1:1) Steiner	Attendance: 7,200; Referee: (Switzerland) Philippe Mercier
Note: First NLA appearance for 17-year-old Dane Ronnie Frederiksen.

26 September 1987 Round 12	Basel	0–1	Aarau	St. Jakob Stadium, Basel
20:00	Eggeling (yellow card) 29'; Smith (yellow card) 81'	FCB summary FCA summary	(yellow card) 2' Wyss; (yellow card) 70' Nazar; 74' (0:1) Rufer	Attendance: 6,500; Referee: (Switzerland) Peter Kellenberger
Note: FCB captain Peter Nadig honored for his 100th NLA game.

3 October 1987 Round 13	Lausanne-Sport	5–0	Basel	Olympique de la Pontaise, Lausanne
20:00	Castella 26' (1:0); Schürmann 36' (2:0); Chapuisat 56' (3:0); Castella 68' (4:0); Castella 89' (5:0)	FCB summary		Attendance: 4,000; Referee: (Switzerland) Bruno Klötzli (Bévilard)
Note: NLA debut for Massimo Ceccaroni (FCB). No cautions, excellent refereeing. Corners: 9:6 (4:4).

10 October 1987 Round 14	Basel	1–2	Xamax	St. Jakob Stadium, Basel
20:00	Smith 10' (1:0)	FCB summary	(yellow card) 36' Thévénaz; 44' (1:1) Nielsen; 70' (1:2) van der Gijp	Attendance: 6,200; Referee: (Switzerland) Freddy Philippoz (Sion)
Note: A fair match, but with inadequate refereeing (advantage rule, distances at free kicks, overly strict enforcement of challenges). Corners: 6:4 (3:2).

13 October 1987 Round 15	Grasshopper Club	5–1	Basel	Hardturm, Zürich
20:00	Ponte 25' (1:0); Paulo Cesar 33' (2:0); Egli 51' (3:0); Sforza 60' (4:0); Ponte 90' (5:1)	FCB summary	75' (4:1) Nadig	Attendance: 2,100; Referee: (Switzerland) Daniel Roduit (Sion)
Note: Grasshopper Club Zurich (GC) appealed against UEFA's stadium ban. FC Basel arrived only 45 minutes before kickoff because, due to a misunderstanding, the bus missed its meeting point with coach Urs Siegenthaler in Sissach and had to turn back.

24 October 1987 Round 16	Basel	3–1	Sion	St. Jakob Stadium, Basel
20:00	Thoma 19' (1:0); Smith (yellow card) 61'; Rey 62' (o.g. 2:1); Smith 77' (3:1)	FCB summary	(yellow card) 29' Bonvin; 35' (1:1) Bregy; (yellow card) 57' (yellow-red card) 88' Bouderbala	Attendance: 3,500; Referee: (Switzerland) Francis Fischer (Arch)

31 October 1987 Round 17	Bellinzona	2–2	Basel	Stadio Comunale Bellinzona, Bellinzona
17:30	Türkyilmaz 2' (1:0); Türkyilmaz 86' (2:2)	FCB summary	9' (1:1) Bützer; (yellow card) 14' Baumberger; (yellow card) 64' Smith; 69' (1:2) Nadig; (yellow card) 86' Zahner	Attendance: 3,000; Referee: (Switzerland) Arturo Martino (Neukirch an der Thur)
Note: First NLA appearances for Reich and De Lusi.

4 November 1987 Round 18	St. Gallen	2–0	Basel	Espenmoos, St. Gallen
20:00	Piserchia 29' (1:0); Piserchia 52' (2:0); Rietmann (yellow card) 63'; Zwicker (red card) 86'	FCB summary	(yellow card) 67' Zahner	Attendance: 6,500; Referee: (Switzerland) Peter Kellenberger

21 November 1987 Round 19	Basel	0–0	Servette	St. Jakob Stadium, Basel
14:30	Cacciapaglia (yellow card) 41'	FCB summary	(yellow card) 56' Smith; (yellow card) 71' Bernauer	Attendance: 4,000; Referee: (Switzerland) Marcel Despland (Yverdon-les-Bains)
Note: A very correct refereeing performance, despite his possible incorrect decision regarding Bamert's header, which Stefan Bützer may have kicked away from behind the goal line in the 65th minute. Corners: 1:7 (0:4).

28 November 1987 Round 20	Zürich	0–4	Basel	Letzigrund, Zürich
14:30	Rufer (yellow card) 36'	FCZ summary FCB summary	12' (0:1) Nadig; 37' (pen. 0:2) Knup; (yellow card) 51' Bützer; 63' (0:3) Knup; 71' (0:4) Knup; (yellow card) 81' Hauser	Attendance: 2,700; Referee: (Switzerland) Kurt Röthlisberger (Suhr)
Note: First NLA appearance for 18-year-old FCB junior Fotios Karapetsas, a Greek who has lived in Basel for seven years and holds Swiss football rights. Corners: 5:4 (2:3).

6 December 1987 Round 21	Luzern	2–0	Basel	Stadion Allmend Luzern
14:30	Mohr 4' (1:0); M. Müller 66' (2:0)	FCB summary	(yellow card) 79' Zahner	Attendance: 9,100; Referee: (Switzerland) Franz Gächter (Aarau, Suhr, Aargau)
Note: NLA debut for Adrian Sedlo

13 December 1987 Round 22	Basel	1–4	Young Boys	St. Jakob Stadium, Basel
14:30	Knup 80' (1:3)	FCB summary	19' (0:1) Zuffi; 49' (o.g. 0:2) Smith; 60' (0:3) Holmqvist; 81' (1:4) Holmqvist	Attendance: 3,000; Referee: (Switzerland) Arturo Martino (Neukirch an der Thur)

==== Qualification table ====
Pos	Team	Pld	W	D	L	GF	GA	GD	Pts	Qualification
1	Xamax	22	13	5	4	53	28	+25	31	Advance to championship round halved points (rounded up) as bonus
2	Grasshopper Club	22	12	6	4	30	16	+14	30	Advance to championship round halved points (rounded up) as bonus
3	Young Boys	22	7	12	3	37	28	+9	26	Advance to championship round halved points (rounded up) as bonus
4	Aarau	22	9	7	6	28	24	+4	25	Advance to championship round halved points (rounded up) as bonus
5	St. Gallen	22	9	5	8	28	27	+1	23	Advance to championship round halved points (rounded up) as bonus
6	Luzern	22	7	9	6	30	29	+1	23	Advance to championship round halved points (rounded up) as bonus
7	Servette	22	8	7	7	32	31	+1	23	Advance to championship round halved points (rounded up) as bonus
8	Lausanne-Sport	22	8	7	7	39	39	0	23	Advance to championship round halved points (rounded up) as bonus
9	Sion	22	8	6	8	42	36	+6	22	Advance to promotion/relegation group B
10	Bellinzona	22	3	8	11	25	38	−13	14	Advance to promotion/relegation group A
11	Basel	22	4	5	13	27	55	−28	13	Advance to promotion/relegation group A
12	Zürich	22	4	3	15	26	46	−20	11	Advance to promotion/relegation group B

Source: rsssf.com

==== Second stage ====
Promotion/relegation group A

5 March 1988 Round 1	Basel	4–0	Etoile-Carouge	St. Jakob Stadium, Basel
20:00	Thoma 5' (1:0); Thoma 52' (2:0); Hauser 70' (3:0); Hauser 73' (4:0)	FCB summary	(yellow card) 42' Nogués; (yellow card) 45' Harder	Attendance: 2,200; Referee: (Switzerland) Freddy Philippoz (Sion)
Note: Correct refereeing. Corners: 5:0. The entire Old Boys team as well as the coaches Marcel CornioleyCornioley (Wettingen), Richard (Malley), Andrey (Bulle) and Luttrop (Olten) in the stands as spectators.

19 March 1988 Round 2	Bulle	0–2	Basel	Stade de Bouleyres, Bulle
14:30		FCB summary	87' (0:1) Sundramoorthy; 90+1' (0:2) Bützer	Attendance: 2,800; Referee: (Switzerland) Francis Fischer (Arch)
Note: The match started ten minutes late due to rioting and fights in the standing-area section between police and hooligans which continued during the game. Correct refereeing.

23 March 1988 Round 3	Basel	1–0	Malley	St. Jakob Stadium, Basel
20:00	Thoma 8' (1:0)	FCB summary	(yellow card) 19' Knigge	Attendance: 2,500; Referee: (Switzerland) Bruno Klötzli (Bévilard)

30 March 1988 Round 4	Bellinzona	4–1	Basel	Stadio Comunale Bellinzona, Bellinzona
20:00	Türkyilmaz 10' (1:0); Pellegrini 15' (2:0); Pellegrini 36' (3:1); Pellegrini 44' (4:1); Germann (yellow card) 58'	FCB summary	27' (2:1) Dittus; (yellow card) 38' Hauser; (yellow card) 86' Dittus	Attendance: 1,100; Referee: (Switzerland) Manfred Schlup, (Grenchen)
Note: The ground on the edge of being playable.

4 April 1988 Round 5	Basel	0–2	Wettingen	St. Jakob Stadium, Basel
14:30	Hauser (yellow card) 36' (yellow-red card) 38'; Nadig (yellow card) 42'	FCB summary	28' (0:1) Rueda; (yellow card) 72' Bertelsen; 79' (0:2) Svensson	Attendance: 6,800; Referee: (Switzerland) Paul-Louis Christe (Lausanne)
Note: Wettingen goalkeeper Andy Meier with his debut in the National League. Referee Christe's first championship match in the NLA. Corners: 6:7.

9 April 1988 Round 6	Old Boys	3–3	Basel	Stadion Schützenmatte, Basel
20:00	Herr 16' (o.g.); Kägi 23' (2:0); Lius 27' (3:0); Maurer (yellow card) 70' de Almeida (yellow card) 76'	FCB summary	39' (3:1) Thoma; 53' (3:2) Thoma; 87' (3:3) Dittus	Attendance: 5,400; Referee: (Switzerland) Peter Kellenberger
Note: Correct refereeing. Torrential rain throughout the entire match. Corners: 8:5.

16 April 1988 Round 7	Basel	4–1	Schaffhausen	St. Jakob Stadium, Basel
20:00	Ceccaroni (yellow card) 17'; Bützer 41' (1:1); Dittus (yellow card) 45'; Hauser 55' (2:1); Knup 63' (pen. 3:1); R. Thoma 85' (4:1)	FCB summary	15' (0:1) A. Thoma; (yellow card) 43' Filomeno; (yellow card) 62' Lehmann; (yellow card) 64' Mercanti; (yellow card) 67' Heydecker	Attendance: 5,500; Referee: (Switzerland) Georges Sandoz (Corcelles-Cormondrèche, Neuchâtel)

23 April 1988 Round 8	Etoile-Carouge	0–6	Basel	Stade de la Fontenette, Carouge
17:30	Harder (yellow card); Radi (yellow card); Tóth (yellow card)	FCB summary	18' (0:1) Nadig; 20' (0:2) Nadig; 33' (0:3) Nadig; 45' (0:4) Bützer; 53' (0:5) Sundramoorthy; 68' (0:6) Knup	Attendance: 850; Referee: (Switzerland) Francis Fischer (Arch)

30 April 1988 Round 9	Basel	1–2	Bulle	St. Jakob Stadium, Basel
20:00	Knup 77' (pen. 1:2)	FCB summary	33' (0:1) Lehnherr; 70' (0:2) Lehnherr; (yellow card) 77' Esseiva; (yellow card) 90+2' Hofer	Attendance: 4,500; Referee: (Switzerland) Marcel Despland (Yverdon-les-Bains)

3 May 1988 Round 10	Malley	2–2	Basel	Stade du Bois Gentil, Malley (Lausanne)
18:45	Salou (yellow card) 58'; Salou 61' (pen. 1:2); Martelli 72' (2:2)	FCB summary	7' (0:1) Knup; 17' (0:2) Nadig	Attendance: 920; Referee: (Switzerland) Kurt Röthlisberger (Suhr, Aargau)
Note: Corners: 5:5. Flawless refereeing performance.

7 May 1988 Round 11	Basel	0–2	Bellinzona	St. Jakob Stadium, Basel
	Pulver (yellow card) 85'	FCB summary	(yellow card) 17' Gilli; (yellow card) 66' Aeby; 77' (0:1) Aeby; 86' (0:2) Jacobacci	Attendance: 7,600; Referee: (Switzerland) Franz Gächter (Aarau, Suhr, Aargau)
Note: Correct refereeing. Corners: 7:1.

14 May 1988 Round 12	Wettingen	3–2	Basel	Stadion Altenburg, Wettingen
20:00	Svensson 4'; Baumgartner 11'; Merin (yellow card) 37'; Schepull 41'; Häusermann (yellow card) 57'	FCB summary	21' Dittus; 36' Sundramoorthy; (yellow card) 60' Bützer; (yellow card) 62' Hodel; (yellow card) 70' Hauser; (red card) 88' Sundramoorthy	Attendance: 3,500; Referee: (Switzerland) Daniel Roduit (Sion)
Note: A completely inadequate, inconsistent and "nitpicky" refereeing performance.

19 May 1988 Round 13	Basel	1–1	Old Boys	St. Jakob Stadium, Basel
20:00	Knup 47' (1:0); Bützer (yellow card) 51'; Hauser (yellow card) 54'	FCB summary	(yellow card) 4' Lüdi; (yellow card) 48' Cosenza; 66' (1:1) Magro	Attendance: 1,400; Referee: (Switzerland) Bruno Klötzli (Bévilard)

21 May 1988 Round 14	Schaffhausen	0–0	Basel	Stadion Breite, Schaffhausen
20:00		FCB summary		Attendance: 2,850; Referee: (Switzerland) Francis Fischer (Arch)

==== League standings ====
Pos	Team	Pld	W	D	L	GF	GA	GD	Pts	Qualification
1	Wettingen	14	11	0	3	32	16	+16	22	Promotion to Nationalliga A 1988–89
2	AC Bellinzona	14	8	1	5	29	20	+9	17	Remain in Nationalliga A 1988–89
3	Schaffhausen	14	7	1	6	25	22	+3	15	Remain in Nationalliga B
4	ES Malley	14	7	1	6	21	20	+1	15	Remain in Nationalliga B
5	Basel	14	5	4	5	27	20	+7	14	Relegation to Nationalliga B 1988–89
6	Bulle	14	7	0	7	28	25	+3	14	Remain in Nationalliga B
7	Etoile Carouge	14	4	1	9	14	33	−19	9	Remain in Nationalliga B
8	Old Boys	14	2	2	10	11	31	−20	6	Remain in Nationalliga B

Source: rsssf.com

=== Swiss Cup ===
15 November 1987 Round of 64	Old Boys	2–1	Basel	Stadion Schützenmatte, Basel
14:30	Magro 60' (1:0); Fanciulli 67' (2:0)	FCB summary	83' (2:1) Bützer; (penalty missed) 90+1′ Bützer	Attendance: 7,800; Referee: (Switzerland) Serge Muhmenthaler

== See also ==
- History of FC Basel
- List of FC Basel players
- List of FC Basel seasons

== Sources ==
- Rotblau: Jahrbuch Saison 2015/2016. Publisher: FC Basel Marketing AG. ISBN 978-3-7245-2050-4
- Die ersten 125 Jahre. Publisher: Josef Zindel im Friedrich Reinhardt Verlag, Basel. ISBN 978-3-7245-2305-5
- The FCB squad 1987–88 at fcb-archiv.ch
- 1987–88 at RSSSF
