= 1987–88 Swiss Cup =

Tournament details
- Country: Switzerland
- Teams: 192

Final positions
- Champions: Grasshoppers
- Runners-up: FC Schaffhausen

Tournament statistics
- Matches played: 191

The 1987–88 Swiss Cup was the 63rd season of Switzerland's annual football cup competition. It began on 1 August with the first games of Round 1 and ended on 23 May 1988 with the Final held at Wankdorf, Bern. The winners earned a place in the first round of the Cup Winners' Cup.

== Overview ==
The competition began on 9 August 1986 with the first games of Round 1 and ended on Whit Monday 8 June 1987 with the final held at the former Wankdorf Stadium in Bern. The teams from the Nationalliga B were granted byes for the first round. The teams from the Nationalliga A were granted byes for the first two rounds. The winners of the cup qualified themselves for the first round of the Cup Winners' Cup in the next season.

The draw was respecting regionalities, when possible, and the lower classed team was granted home advantage. In the entire competition, the matches were played in a single knockout format. In the event of a draw after 90 minutes, the match went into extra time. In the event of a draw at the end of extra time, a penalty shoot-out was to decide which team qualified for the next round. No replays were foreseen.

== Round 1 ==
In the first round a total of 156 clubs participated from the third-tier and lower. Reserve teams were not admitted to the competition.

=== Summary ===
Team 1	Score	Team 2
1 August 1987
Central Fribourg	3–2	FC Vernier
FC Coppet	1–4	Stade Lausanne
FC Vouvry	1–3	FC Lalden
CS La Tour-de-Peilz	0–2	FC Savièse
FC Leuk-Susten	0–4	FC Raron
Etoile Espagnole GE	FF * awd. 0–3	Urania Genève Sport
FC Riddes	2–0	Espagnol Lausanne
FC Grimisuat	2–4	FC Leytron
FC Gland	1–5	Fribourg
FC Chailly	0–4	FC Châtel-St-Denis
FC Aubonne	0–5	Folgore Lausanne
FC Crans	3–2	FC Bavois
FC Bramois	1–3	Monthey
FC Bex	0–4	FC Aigle
US Meinier GE	1–2	FC Saint-Jean GE
FC Puidoux	0–4	Echallens
Meyrin	3–4 (a.e.t.)	Grand-Lancy
FC Fontenais	2–1	Düdingen
FC Boudry	2–0 (a.e.t.)	Köniz
FC Saint-Blaise	0–2	FC Bern
Alle	2–0	FC Serrières
FC Bassecourt	2–1	FC Le Locle
FC Beauregard Fribourg	0–3	Colombier
FC Farvagny	1–2	Moutier
FC Siviriez	6–5	Bümpliz
FC Mervelier	2–4 (a.e.t.)	FC Saint-Imier
FC Domdidier	3–5	Delémont
SC Reiden	2–0	SV Lyss
FC Hergiswil	2–1	Ibach
FC Küssnacht	0–3	FC Zug
FC Spiez	5–2	Dürrenast
FC Hochdorf	0–3	FC Sursee
FC Root	0–2	FC Länggasse (Bern)
FC Büren an der Aare	0–2	Emmenbrücke
Azzurri Bienne	1–3 (a.e.t.)	Thun
FC Bettlach	0–2	Kriens
FC Münsingen	0–4	FC Lerchenfeld (Thun)
FC Wohlhusen	0–8	FC Einsiedeln
FC Münchenbuchsee	1–6	FC Emmen
FC Cham	1–3	Buochs
FC Zolikofen	0–3	FC Altdorf (Uri)
Brugg	5–2	FC Klus-Balstahl
Muttenz	1–0	SC Baudepartement Basel
FC Münchenstein	3–1	FC Allschwil
FC Rheinfelden	1–1 (a.e.t.) (3–4 p)	FC Breite (Basel)
Concordia Basel	1–3	Laufen
SV Halten	0–5	FC Breitenbach
FC Frick	3–3 (a.e.t.) (3–4 p)	Burgdorf
FC Wolfwil	0–7	FC Muri (AG)
SC Derendingen	2–1	Nordstern
FC Gränichen	1–2	FC Welschenrohr
Wohlen	2–1	FC Suhr
FC Spreitenbach	0–4	FC Langenthal
FC Aesch	0–1	Lengnau
FC Appenzell	3–5	Tuggen
Racing Zürich	1–3	FC Staad
SC Veltheim (Winterthur)	1–6	Vaduz
FC Beringen	1–1 (a.e.t.) (8–9 p)	Gossau
FC Bad Ragaz	2–3	FC Altstätten (St. Gallen)
FC Bütschwil	2–1	FC Wiedikon
FC Wülflingen	1–7	FC Stäfa
FC Landquart	2–1 (a.e.t.)	Brühl
FC Industrie (ZH)	2–3	Blue Stars
FC Freienbach	1–2	Red Star
FC Bülach	1–2	FC Küsnacht (ZH)
FC Amriswil	0–2	Herisau
FC Effretikon	1–0	FC Seefeld Zürich
FC Buttikon	0–3	FC Rüti (ZH)
FC Adliswil	1–5	FC Dübendorf
Frauenfeld	3–0 (a.e.t.)	FC Rorschach
FC Uznach	0–1	FC Neuhausen
Inter Club ZH	1–2	FC Brüttisellen
USV Eschen/Mauren	0–1	Balzers
FC Tresa	1–2	FC Ascona
SC Balerna	2–3	Mendrisio
US Monte Carasso	3–0	AC Sementina

- FC Plan-les-Ouates, FC Hägglingen, FC Kilchberg (ZH) and FC Morbio qualified to the next round with byes.
- Etoile Espagnole declaired forfeit, the match was awarded as a 3–0 victory to Urania.

== Round 2 ==
The teams from the Nationalliga B joined the competition in this round. The draw respected regionalities, when possible and the lower classed team was granted home advantage.

=== Summary ===
Team 1	Score	Team 2
8–9 August 1987
Monthey	3–1	Folgore Lausanne
Echallens	3–2 (a.e.t.)	Central Fribourg
FC Riddes	1–8	Chênois
Grand-Lancy	4–0	FC Savièse
FC Raron	1–3	ES Malley
FC Aigle	5–1	FC Lalden
FC Leytron	1–4	Etoile Carouge
FC Plan-les-Ouates	3–1	FC Crans
FC Saint-Jean GE	1–2	FC Châtel-St-Denis
Urania Genève Sport	0–1	Martigny-Sports
Stade Lausanne	4–2	FC Renens
FC Boudry	2–3	FC Siviriez
FC Saint-Imier	1–1 (a.e.t.) (2–4 p)	FC Bassecourt
Moutier	0–4	Delémont
Colombier	4–3	Yverdon-Sports
FC Fontenais	1–4	Vevey-Sports
Alle	0–2	Bulle
FC Bern	0–1	Montreux-Sports
Fribourg	2–0	La Chaux-de-Fonds
FC Einsielden	2–1	Kriens
FC Spiez	2–6	Buochs
FC Lerchenfeld (Thun)	0–1	FC Sursee
FC Zug	2–3	Biel-Bienne
Thun	6–5 (a.e.t.)	Emmenbrücke
SC Reiden	0–10	Grenchen
SC Emmen	5–1	FC Hergiswil
FC Altdorf (Uri)	0–6	SC Zug
FC Länggasse (Bern)	0–1	Solothurn
Brugg	2–0	FC Langenthal
SC Derendingen	1–0	Muttenz
FC Suhr	0–3	Baden
FC Welschenrohr	2–5	Old Boys
FC Muri	1–5	Wettingen
Laufen	4–1	FC Hägglingen
FC Münchenstein	5–2	Burgdorf
Lengnau	0–2 (a.e.t.)	FC Breitenbach
FC Breite (Basel)	0–3	FC Olten
FC Dübendorf	2–0	FC Kilchberg (ZH)
FC Landquart	1–3	Locarno
Vaduz	2–0	Red Star
FC Küsnacht (ZH)	1–0	Gossau
Balzers	2–3	FC Altstätten (St. Gallen)
Tuggen	2–0	FC Effretikon
FC Rüti	0–9	FC Schaffhausen
Blue Stars	2–6	Frauenfeld
FC Bütschwil	2–1 (a.e.t.)	FC Staad
FC Neuhausen	0–5	Lugano
FC Stäfa ZH	1–3	Chiasso
FC Brüttisellen	3–5 (a.e.t.)	Winterthur
Herisau	0–1	Chur
FC Ascona	1–0	FC Morbio
US Monte Carasso	3–3 (a.e.t.) (6–7 p)	Mendrisio

== Round 3 ==
The teams from the Nationalliga A joined the competition in this round. The draw was respecting regionalities, when possible and the lower classed team was granted home advantage.

=== Summary ===
Team 1	Score	Team 2
18 October 1987
FC Bütschwil	0–6	Grasshopper Club
24 October 1987
FC Châtel-St-Denis	0–2	Servette
25 October 1987
Monthey	1–4	Lausanne-Sport
28 October 1987
Delémont	0–2	Xamax
31 October 1987
Colombier	0–1	Young Boys
FC Küsnacht (ZH)	0–7	St. Gallen
7 November 1987
FC Dübendorf	2–1	Vaduz
ES Malley	4–1	Martigny-Sports
FC Münchenstein	1–9	'Lugano '
Tuggen	0–0 (a.e.t.) (4–5 p)	'Winterthur '
Solothurn	2–1	FC Sursee
15 November 1987
Grand-Lancy	1–1 (a.e.t.) (2–3 p)	Étoile-Carouge
FC Ascona	2–1	Laufen
FC Olten	2–1	Aarau
FC Plan-les-Ouates	0–5	Echallens
FC Aigle	0–5	Chênois
FC Altstätten (St. Gallen)	1–2 (a.e.t.)	Locarno
Biel-Bienne	8–3	Thun
FC Breitenbach	0–3	Wettingen
Chur	1–2	Frauenfeld
SC Derendingen	0–2	Baden
SC Emmen	0–6	Luzern
Grenchen	3–1	SC Zug
Old Boys	2–1	Basel
Vevey-Sports	0–6	Bulle
Brugg	0–1	Mendrisio
FC Bassecourt	2–1	FC Siviriez
Fribourg	2–0	Montreux-Sports
18 November 1987
Chiasso	0–4	Zürich
24 November 1987
Stade Lausanne	0–3	Sion
13 March 1988
FC Schaffhausen	4–0	Bellinzona

=== Matches ===
19 October 1987

FC Bütschwil	0–6	Grasshopper Club
	RSSSF summary	23' (0:1) Stiel; 48' (0:2) Paulo César; 54' (0:3) Ponte; 60' (0:4) Sforza; 77' (0:5) Matthey; 88' (0:6) Imhof

Breite Bütschwil
- FC Bütschwil played the 1987/88 season in the 2. Liga (fourth-tier).

24 October 1987

FC Châtel-Saint-Denis	0–2	Servette
	Servette summary	73' (0:1) Eriksen; 90' (0:2) Rummenigge

Stade du Lussy, Châtel-Saint-Denis
- FC Châtel-Saint-Denis played the 1987/88 season in the 1. Liga (third-tier).

31 October 1987

Colombier	0–1	Young Boys
	YB summary	53' (o.g.) Freiholz; (red card) 87' A. Sutter

Stade des Chézards. Neuchâtel
Attendance: 2,100
Referee: (Switzerland) Marcel Despland (Yverdon-les-Bains)
- FC Colombier played the 1987/88 season in the 1. Liga (third-tier).

7 November 1987
14:30

FC Münchenstein	1–9	Lugano
Stöcklin 52' (1:5)	RSSSF summary	4' (0:1) Maccini; 8' (0:2) Gorter; 18' (0:3) Pelosi; 22' (0:4) Jensen; 25' (0:5) Sulser; 35' (0:6) Gorter; 60' (1:7) Pelosi; 65' (1:8) Jensen; 67' (pen.) Gorter

Sportplatz Au, Münchenstein
Attendance: 2,000 sold out
Referee: (Switzerland) Andreas Schluchter (Schönenbuch)
- FC Münchenstein played the 1987/88 season in the 2. Liga (fourth-tier).

15 November 1987
14:30

Old Boys	2 – 1	Basel
Magro 60' (1:0); Fanciulli 67' (2:0)	FCB summary	83' (2:1) Bützer; (penalty missed) 90+1′ Bützer

Stadion Schützenmatte, Basel
Attendance: 7,800
Referee: (Switzerland) Serge Muhmenthaler
- Old Boys played the 1987/88 season in the NLB (second-tier).

18 November 1987

Chiasso	0–4	Zürich
Sordelli (yellow card)	FCZ summary	15' (0:1) Bickel; 37' (0:2) Bickel; 60' (0:3) Bickel; 87' (0:4) Kundert; (yellow card) Uccella

Stadio Comunale Riva IV, Chiasso
Attendance: 1,200
Referee: (Switzerland) Georges Sandoz (Corcelles-Cormondrèche, Neuchâtel)
- Chiasso played the 1987/88 season in the NLB (second-tier).

== Round 4 ==
=== Summary ===
Team 1	Score	Team 2
12 March 1988
ES Malley	0–0 (a.e.t.) (7–8 p)	Étoile-Carouge
Biel-Bienne	2–3	Servette
Young Boys	4–0	FC Olten
Xamax	3–1	Lugano
13 March 1988
Grenchen	1–2	Sion
FC Ascona	2–2 (a.e.t.) (8–9 p)	Frauenfeld
Bulle	4–1	FC Bassecourt
Echallens	2–1	Fribourg
Wettingen	0–2 *	Grasshopper Club
Lausanne-Sport	2–0	Chênois
Luzern	3–2	Locarno
Mendrisio	0–1	St. Gallen
Old Boys	3–1	Winterthur
Zürich	6–1	FC Dübendorf
23 March 1988
Solothurn	3–0	Buochs
27 March 1988
FC Schaffhausen	1–0	Baden

- The match Wettingen–Grasshopper Club was played in Zürich

=== Matches ===
12 March 1988
15:00

ES Malley	0–0 (a.e.t.)	Étoile-Carouge
	RSSSF summary
Penalties
Penalty scored Penalty missed	7–8	Penalty scored

Centre sportif de la Tuilière, Malley
- Malley and Étoile-Carouge both played the 1987/88 season in the NLB (second-tier).

12 March 1988
17:00

Biel-Bienne	2–3	Servette
Terregna 27' (1:2); Ondrus 80' (2:3)	Servette summary	7' (0:1) Rummenigge; 10' (0:2) Eriksen; 61' (1:3) Rummenigge

Stadion Gurzelen, Biel/Bienne
- Biel-Bienne played the 1987/88 season in the NLB (second-tier) and Sevette in the NLA (top-tier).

12 March 1988
17:30

Young Boys	4–0	FC Olten
Zuffi 58' (1:0); Közle 63' (2:0); Közle 71' (3:0); Maissen 82' (4:0)	YB summary	(yellow card) 85' Baumann

Wankdorf Stadium, Bern
Attendance: 1,170
Referee: (Switzerland) Kurt Röthlisberger (Suhr)
- Young Boys played the 1987/88 season in the NLA (top-tier) and Olten in the NLB (second-tier)

12 March 1988
18:15

Xamax	3–1	Lugano
Sutter 33' (1:0); Ryf 46' (2:0); Lüthi 73' (3:1)	RSSSF summary	50' (pen.) Gorter

Stade de la Maladière, Neuchâtel
- Xamax played the 1987/88 season in the NLA (top-tier) and Lugano in the NLB (second-tier)

13 March 1988
14:30

Grenchen	1–2	Sion
Maier 85' (1:1)	RSSSF summary	39' (0:1) Lorenz; 87' (1:2) Brigger

Stade Tourbillon, Sion

+ Grenchen played the 1987/88 season in the NLB (second-tier) and Sion in the NLA (top-tier).

13 March 1988
14:30

FC Ascona	2–2 (a.e.t.)	Frauenfeld
Madonna 71' (1:2); Zanolari 87' (2:2)	RSSSF summary	25' (0:1) Studer; 32' (0:2) Korff
Penalties
Penalty scored Penalty missed	8–9	Penalty scored

Stadio Comunale, Ascona
- Ascona and Frauenfeld both played the 1987/88 season in the 1. Liga (third-tier)

13 March 1988

Bulle	4–1	FC Bassecourt
Dmitric 20' (1:0); Lehnherr 38' (2:1); Rössli 68' (pen.); Zurkinden 86' (4:1)	RSSSF summary	30' (1:1) Boillat

Stade de Bouleyres, Bulle
- Bulle played the 1987/88 season in the NLB (second-tier) and Bassecourt in the 2. Liga (fourth-tier).

13 March 1988

Echallens	2–1	Fribourg
Chatelain 81' (1:1); Salzano 88' (2:1)	RSSSF summary	45' (0:1) Kreff

Sportplatz 3 Sapins, Échallens
- Echallens and Fribourg both played the 1987/88 season in the 1. Liga (third-tier)

13 March 1988

Wettingen	0–2	Grasshopper Club
	RSSSF summary	67' (0:1) Matthey; 81' (0:2) Stiel

Zürich
- Wettingen played the 1987/88 season in the NLB (second-tier) and the Grasshoppers in the NLA (top-tier).

13 March 1988

Lausanne-Sport	2–0	Chênois
Bissig 53' (1:0); Thychosen 79' (2:0)	RSSSF summary

Olympique de la Pontaise, Lausanne
- Lausanne-Sport played the 1987/88 season in the NLA (top-tier) and Chênois in the NLB (second-tier)

13 March 1988

Luzern	3–2	Locarno
Müller 6' (1:0); Halter 60' (2:1); Bernaschina 87' (3:2)	RSSSF summary	23' (pen.) Kurz; 66' (2:2) Kurz

Stadion Allmend, Luzern
- Luzern played the 1987/88 season in the NLA (top-tier) and Locarno in the NLB (second-tier)

13 March 1988

Mendrisio	0–1	St. Gallen
	RSSSF summary	10' (0:1) Metzler

Centro Sportivo Comunale, Mendrisio
- Mendrisio played the 1987/88 season in the 1. Liga (third-tier) and St. Gallen in the NLA (top-tier).

13 March 1988

Old Boys	3–1	Winterthur
Kägi 3' (1:0); Troani 4' (2:0); Lius 14' (3:0)	RSSSF summary	84' (3:1) Roth

Stadion Schützenmatte, Basel
- Old Boys and Winterthur both played the 1987/88 season in the NLB (second-tier).

13 March 1988

Zürich	6–1	FC Dübendorf
Linford 21' (1:0); Kundert 36' (pen.); Studer 54' (3:0); Rufer (yellow card) 54'; Perisset 68' (4:0); Studer 74' (5:0); Bickel 80' (6:1)	FCZ summary	76' (5:1) Metschl

Letzigrund, Zürich
Attendance: 1,100
Referee: (Switzerland) Bruno Galler (Kirchdorf, Bern)
- Zürich played the 1987/88 season in the NLA (top-tier) and Dübendorf in the 1. Liga (third-tier).

23 March 1988
20:00

Solothurn	3–0	Buochs
Largiader 30' (1:0); Zürcher 36' (2:0); Largiader 87' (3:0)	RSSSF summary

Stadion FC Solothurn, Solothurn
- Solothurn played the 1987/88 season in the NLB (second-tier) and Buochs in the 1. Liga (third-tier).

27 March 1988
20:00

FC Schaffhausen	1–0	Baden
Filomeno 25' (1:0)	RSSSF summary

Stadion Breite, Schaffhausen
- Schaffhausen and Baden both played the 1987/88 season in the NLB (second-tier).

== Round 5 ==
=== Summary ===
Team 1	Score	Team 2
26 March 1988
Étoile-Carouge	1–0	Frauenfeld
Grasshopper Club	2–1 (a.e.t.)	Servette
Lausanne-Sport	0–1	Zürich
27 March 1988
Sion	0–3	Xamax
Solothurn	1–3	Bulle
2 April 1988
Young Boys	1–0 (a.e.t.)	Old Boys
9 April 1988
FC Schaffhausen	2–0 (a.e.t.)	Echallens
19 April 1988
Luzern	2–4 (a.e.t.)	St. Gallen

- The match Solothurn–Bulle was played in Bulle.

=== Matches ===
26 March 1988
17:30

Étoile-Carouge	1–0	Frauenfeld
Isabella 23' (1:0)	RSSSF summary

Stade de la Fontenette, Carouge

26 March 1988
17:30

Grasshopper Club	2–1 (a.e.t.)	Servette
Andermatt 2' (1:0); Paulo César 93 pen 2:1'	Servette summary	71' (1:1) Rummenigge

Hardturm, Zürich

26 March 1988
20:00

Lausanne-Sport	0–1	Zürich
	FCZ summary	41' (0:1) Bickel

Olympique de la Pontaise, Lausanne
Attendance: 2.200
Referee: (Switzerland) Kurt Röthlisberger (Suhr)

27 March 1988
14:30

Sion	0–3	Xamax
	RSSSF summary	11' (0:1) Lüthi; 44' (pen.) Lei-Ravello; 71' (0:3) Lüthi

Stade Tourbillon, Sion

27 March 1988

Solothurn	1–3	Bulle
Banjali 79' (pen.)	RSSSF summary	8' (0:1) Lehnherr; 28' (0:2) Lehnherr; 37' (0:3) Rössli

Stade de Bouleyres, Bulle

2 April 1988
17:30

Young Boys	1–0 (a.e.t.)	Old Boys
Baumann (yellow card) 85'; Nilsson 91' (1:0)	YB summary

Wankdorf Stadium, Bern
Attendance: 2.300
Referee: (Switzerland) Serge Muhmenthaler (Grenchen)

9 April 1988
20:00

FC Schaffhausen	2–0 (a.e.t.)	Echallens
Dreher 100' (0:1); Engesser 103' (0:2)	RSSSF summary

Stadion Breite, Schaffhausen

19 April 1988
20:00

Luzern	2–4 (a.e.t.)	St. Gallen
Mohr 11' (1:0); Bernaschina 79' (2:1)	RSSSF summary	76' (1:1) Gämperle; 81' (2:2) Piserchia; 97' (0:3) Hegi; 113' (0:4) Zwicker

Stadion Allmend, Luzern

== Quarter-finals ==
=== Summary ===
Team 1	Score	Team 2
19 April 1988
Bulle	0–1	Étoile-Carouge
Xamax	1–1 (a.e.t.) (4–5 p)	Young Boys
Zürich	1–2	Grasshopper Club
26 April 1988
FC Schaffhausen	2–1 (a.e.t.)	FC St. Gallen

=== Matches ===
19 April 1988
20:00

Bulle	0–1	Étoile-Carouge
	RSSSF summary	16' (0:1) Regillo

Stade de Bouleyres, Bulle
Attendance: 2,200
Referee: (Switzerland) Fredy Philippoz

19 April 1988
20:00

Xamax	1–1 (a.e.t.)	Young Boys
Fasel (yellow card) 20'; Nielsen 68' (1:1)	YB summary	(yellow card) 22' Maissen; (yellow card) 35' Wittwer; 58' (pen. 0:1) Zuffi
Penalties
Hermann (penalty scored); Lei-Ravello (penalty scored); Sutter (penalty missed); Geiger (penalty scored); Nielsen (penalty scored)	4–5	(penalty scored) Wittwer; (penalty scored) Jeitziner; (penalty scored) Weber; (penalty scored) Zuffi; (penalty scored) Holmqvist

Stade de la Maladière (1924), Neuchâtel
Attendance: 8,500
Referee: (Switzerland) Arturo Martino (Neukirch an der Thur)

19 April 1988
20:00

Zürich	1–2	Grasshopper Club
Şahin 53' (1:0)	FCZ summary	67' (1:1) Gren; 76' (o.g.) (Uccella)

Letzigrund, Zürich
Attendance: 8,100
Referee: (Switzerland) Manfred Schlup (Grenchen)

26 April 1988
20:00

FC Schaffhausen	2–1 (a.e.t.)	FC St. Gallen
Engesser 92' (pen 1:0); Fringer (yellow card) 99'; Filomeno 101' (2:0)	RSSSF summary	112' (2:1) Braschler

Stadion Breite, Schaffhausen
Attendance: 5,600
Referee: (Switzerland) Bruno Galler (Kirchdorf, Bern)

== Semi-finals ==
=== Summary ===
Team 1	Score	Team 2
10 May 1988
Étoile-Carouge	1–2 (a.e.t.)	Grasshopper Club
Young Boys	0–1	FC Schaffhausen

=== Matches ===
10 May 1988

Étoile-Carouge	1–2 (a.e.t.)	Grasshopper Club
Walder 45' (1:0); Walder (yellow card) 46'	RSSSF summary	47' (1:1) Gren; (yellow card) 44' (yellow-red card) 71' Matthey; (yellow card) 83' In-Albon; 93' (1:2) Andermatt; (yellow card) 96' Sforza

Stade de la Fontenette, Carouge
Attendance: 6,600
Referee: (Switzerland) Georges Sandoz (Corcelles-Cormondrèche, Neuchâtel)

10 May 1988

Young Boys	0–1	FC Schaffhausen
Maissen (yellow card) 69'	YB summary	(yellow card) 54' Mercanti; 77' (0:1) Filomeno

Wankdorf Stadium, Bern
Attendance: 7,700
Referee: (Switzerland) Renzo Peduzzi (Roveredo)

== Final ==
=== Summary ===
Team 1	Score	Team 2
23 May 1988
Grasshopper Club	2–0	FC Schaffhausen

=== Telegram ===
23 May 1988
15:00

Grasshopper Club	2–0	FC Schaffhausen
Matthey 31'; César 56'; In-Albon (yellow card)	Fussball-Schweiz report

Wankdorf, Bern
Attendance: 33,000
Referee: (Switzerland) Franz Gächter (Aarau)

Grasshopper Club won the cup and this was the club's 17th Swiss Cup title to this date.

== Further in Swiss football ==
- 1987–88 Nationalliga A
- 1987–88 Nationalliga B
- 1987–88 Swiss 1. Liga

== Sources and references ==
- Fussball-Schweiz
- RSSSF Page

Preceded by 1986–87	Swiss Cup seasons	Succeeded by 1988–89
