= Mathias Wehrli =

Swiss footballer (born 1962)

Personal information
- Full name: Mathias Wehrli
- Date of birth: 9 October 1962 (age 64)
- Place of birth: Switzerland
- Position: Defender

Senior career*
Years	Team	Apps	(Gls)
1982–1987	FC Laufen	92	(5)
1987–1988	FC Basel	2	(0)
- * Club domestic league appearances and goals

Mathias Wehrli (born 9 October 1962) is a Swiss former footballer who played in the 1980s as defender.

Wehrli first played for FC Laufen in the Nationalliga B, the second tier of Swiss football. At the end of the season 1985–86 Wehrli and the team suffered relegation but he stayed with the club for another season.

Wehrli joined FC Basel's first team in their 1987–88 season under head-coach Urs Siegenthaler. After playing in five test games, Wehrli played his domestic league debut for his new club in the away game on 8 August 1987 as Basel were defeated 0–2 by Aarau.

Wehrli stayed with the club only this one season and during this time he played a total of seven games for Basel without scoring a goal. Two of these games were in the Nationalliga A and the other five were friendly games.

== Sources ==
- Die ersten 125 Jahre. Publisher: Josef Zindel im Friedrich Reinhardt Verlag, Basel. ISBN 978-3-7245-2305-5
- Verein "Basler Fussballarchiv" Homepage
