= Bernard Pulver =

Swiss footballer and manager (born 1963)

Bernhard Pulver
Personal information
- Date of birth: 15 November 1963 (age 62)
- Position: Goalkeeper

Team information
- Current team: FC Köniz (Chairman)

Youth career
- until 1982: FC Bern

Senior career*
| Years | Team | Apps | (Gls) |
| 1982–1987 | FC Bern | | |
| 1987–1988 | FC Basel | 6 | (0) |
| 1988–1999 | BSC Young Boys | 250 | (0) |

Managerial career
- 2008–2013: FC Köniz
- 2014–2016: FC Köniz
- 2017–2018: FC Köniz
- * Club domestic league appearances and goals

Bernhard Pulver (born 15 November 1963) is a Swiss retired football goalkeeper and later manager. He is a businessman, real estate manager and chairman of FC Köniz.

== Football career ==
=== Playing career ===
Pulver played his youth football with FC Bern and advanced to the first team during the 1982–83 season. FC Bern played in the Nationalliga B, the second tier of Swiss football, but they were relegated at the end of that season. Pulver had stood between the posts on seven occasions and after their relegation he stayed with the club for a further four years.

Pulver then moved on and joined FC Basel's first team for their 1987–88 season under head-coach Urs Siegenthaler. After playing in five test games Pulver played his domestic league debut for his new club in the first game of the season, an away game, on 8 August 1987 as Basel was defeated 1–2 by Aarau. The team played a very bad start to that season, losing the first five league games straight off, conceding 17 goals, scoring just three. In the third round on 15 August they were defeated 1–9 by Xamax. Up until today this is still the highest score defeat that Basel have suffered in their domestic league history. Pulver played in the first four league matches, but then he lost his place in the team. Until the end of the season only played another two matches and the team suffered relegation.

Following their relegation Pulver moved on. During his time with the club Pulver played a total of 14 games for Basel. Six of these games were in the Nationalliga A and eight were friendly games.

Pulver then joined Young Boys and during his second season with them became first choice goalkeeper. He stayed with YB for 11 seasons, until the end of the 1998–99 season when he retired from his active playing career. For YB Pulver made 250 domestic league appearances.

=== Managerial career ===
Later Pulver became coach. In August 2011 he was appointed first team coach of FC Köniz and, with two short interruptions, remained in this position until the end of December 2018. From January 2014 until June 2016 he acted as FC Köniz club manager and at the club's 2016 AGM he took over as chairman of the club.

== Private life ==
Pulver is businessman and real estate manager. Since 2004 he is managing director of MLG Immobilien AG, a real estate firm based in Bern. Since June 2016 he is also delegated of the board of directors of Park Easy RL AG in Zürich.

== Notes ==
=== Sources ===
- Die ersten 125 Jahre. Publisher: Josef Zindel im Friedrich Reinhardt Verlag, Basel. ISBN 978-3-7245-2305-5
- Verein "Basler Fussballarchiv" Homepage
