= Philipp Baumberger =

Swiss footballer (born 1967)

Personal information
- Full name: Philipp Baumberger
- Date of birth: 6 December 1967 (age 58)
- Place of birth: Switzerland
- Position: Defender

Youth career
- until 1987: FC Basel

Senior career*
Years	Team	Apps	(Gls)
1987–1988	FC Basel	4	(0)
- * Club domestic league appearances and goals

Philipp Baumberger (born 6 December 1967) is a Swiss former footballer who played in the late 1980s as defender.

Baumberger played his youth football with FC Basel and joined the first team in their 1987–88 season under head-coach Urs Siegenthaler. After playing in three test games, Baumberger played his domestic league debut for the club in the home game in the St. Jakob Stadium, Basel on 12 August 1987 as Basel were defeated 1–2 by Lausanne-Sport.

His contract ran for one year and at the end of the 1987–88 Nationalliga A season, Baumberger and the team suffered relegation. During this time Baumberger played a total of eight games for Basel without scoring a goal. Four of these games were in the Nationalliga A, one in the Swiss Cup and three were friendly games.

== Sources ==
- Die ersten 125 Jahre. Publisher: Josef Zindel im Friedrich Reinhardt Verlag, Basel. ISBN 978-3-7245-2305-5
- Verein "Basler Fussballarchiv" Homepage
