= Bernd Schramm =

German footballer

Personal information
- Full name: Bernd Schramm
- Date of birth: 14 February 1967 (age 59)
- Position: Defender

Youth career
- until 1987: FC Basel

Senior career*
Years	Team	Apps	(Gls)
1987–1988	FC Basel	9	(0)
- * Club domestic league appearances and goals

Bernd Schramm (born 14 February 1967) is a German former footballer who played in the 1980s as defender.

Schramm played his youth football for FC Basel and advanced into first team in their 1987–88 season under head coach Urs Siegenthaler. After playing in six test games, Schramm played his domestic league debut for the club in the away game on 15 August 1987 as Basel were defeated 1–9 by Xamax.

At the end of the 1987–88 Nationalliga A season the team suffered relegation and after that Schramm left the squad. During this season he played a total of 16 games for Basel scoring four goals. Nine of these games were in the Nationalliga A and seven were friendly games. Schramm scored all of his goals in the same test game on 24 August 1987 as Basel won 13–0 against a team of sport journalists.

== Sources ==
- Die ersten 125 Jahre. Publisher: Josef Zindel im Friedrich Reinhardt Verlag, Basel. ISBN 978-3-7245-2305-5
- Verein "Basler Fussballarchiv" Homepage
