= Adrian Sedlo =

German footballer

Personal information
- Full name: Adrian Sedlo
- Date of birth: 16 November 1969 (age 56)
- Place of birth: Frankfurt am Main, West Germany
- Height: 1.90 m (6 ft 3 in)
- Position: Defender

Youth career
- 1980–1987: FC Basel

Senior career*
Years	Team	Apps	(Gls)
1987–1988	FC Basel	1	(0)
1988–1990	FC Mulhouse		
1990–1991	Eintracht Frankfurt		
- * Club domestic league appearances and goals

Adrian Sedlo (born 16 November 1969) is a German former professional footballer who played in the late 1980s and the early 1990s as a defender.

== Playing career ==
Between 1980 and 1987 Adrian Sedlo played for the youth teams of FC Basel and advanced to their first team in their 1987–88 season under head-coach Urs Siegenthaler. At the age of 18 his first appearance in the professional team of FC Basel. Sedlo played his domestic league debut for the club in the away game on 6 December 1987 as Basel were defeated 0–2 by Luzern. His contract ran for one year, but at the end of the 1987–88 Nationalliga A season, Sedlo and the team suffered relegation. During this time Sedlo played just two games for Basel without scoring a goal. One of these games were in the Nationalliga A and the other was a friendly game.

After Basel, he played for FC Mulhouse in the French Second League. His career ended in the 1990s at the Bundesliga club Eintracht Frankfurt, for which he mainly played in the second team led by team-manager Jürgen Sparwasser in the German Oberliga.

== Private life ==
After law studies at the French University of Strasbourg, Adrian Sedlo became a lawyer in Luxembourg.

== Sources ==
- Die ersten 125 Jahre. Publisher: Josef Zindel im Friedrich Reinhardt Verlag, Basel. ISBN 978-3-7245-2305-5
- Verein "Basler Fussballarchiv" Homepage
