= Ruedi Zahner =

Swiss footballer and manager (born 1957)

Personal information
- Full name: Rudolf Zahner
- Date of birth: 7 February 1957 (age 69)
- Place of birth: Aarau, Switzerland
- Positions: Defender; midfielder

Youth career
- until 1976: FC Aarau

Senior career*
| Years | Team | Apps | (Gls) |
| 1976–1982 | FC Aarau | 96 | (4) |
| 1982–1983 | FC Zürich | 16 | (1) |
| 1983–1984 | FC Zug | 24 | (5) |
| 1984–1987 | FC Aarau | 48 | (7) |
| 1987–1988 | FC Basel | 19 | (1) |

Managerial career
- 1991–1999: Switzerland U-17
- 2006–2007: FC Aarau (assistant)
- 2007: FC Aarau
- * Club domestic league appearances and goals

Rudolf "Ruedi" Zahner (born 7 February 1957) is a Swiss former footballer and coach, who played as a defender during the 1970s, 1980's.

Zahner began playing professionally in 1976 with his local club, FC Aarau. In 1982, he made the step up to FC Zürich but failed to cut it and left for FC Zug, who played one tier lower, after just one season. He returned to FC Aarau in 1984 and played there for another three years. In the season 1984–85 Aarau won the Swiss Cup, beating Xamax 1–0 in the final.

Zahner then moved on to play one season for FC Basel. He joined Basel's first team in their 1987–88 season under head-coach Urs Siegenthaler. After playing in five test games, Zahnder played his domestic league debut for his new club in the away against his former club on 8 August 1987 as Basel were defeated 0–2 by Aarau. He scored his first goal for the club on 19 September in the home game at the St. Jakob Stadium as Basel played a 3–3 draw with Luzern.

Zahner retired from his active playing career at the end of the 1987–88 season. During his time with the club he played a total of 33 games for Basel scoring a total of two goals. 19 of these games were in the Nationalliga A, one in the Swiss Cup and 13 were friendly games. He scored one goal in the domestic league, the other was scored during the test games.

After his retirement, he coached the Swiss under–17s team between the years 1991 and 1999. During the 1992–93 season he was also assistant coach to Rolf Fringer as FC Aarau won the Swiss championship.

In the season 2006–07, he was in the club's board of directors and appointed as assistant manager. He became manager ad-interim in 2007, but stayed in this position for only a short period.

Zahnder studied sports psychology and made a name for himself as an expert in personality and team development.
