= Frank Eggeling =

German footballer

Personal information
- Full name: Frank Eggeling
- Date of birth: 27 July 1963 (age 63)
- Height: 1.79 m (5 ft 10 1/2 in)
- Position: Forward

Senior career*
Years	Team	Apps	(Gls)
1981–1982	VfL Bochum	5	(0)
1982–1983	Eintracht Braunschweig	5	(0)
1983–1984	Rot-Weiss Essen	22	(0)
1984–1985	Union Solingen	27	(9)
1985–1987	FC Grenchen	61	(22)
1987–1988	FC Basel	20	(0)
1988–1991	FC Emmenbrücke	81	(46)
1991–1993	AC Bellinzona	59	(18)
- * Club domestic league appearances and goals

Frank Eggeling (born 27 July 1963) is a retired German football forward.

== Football career ==
After playing his early football with VfL Bochum and Eintracht Braunschweig in the 1. Bundesliga, Eggeling became first choice forward for Rot-Weiss Essen and then a year later with Union Solingen in the 2. Bundesliga. In the summer of 1985 Eggeling transferred to FC Grenchen, who at that time played in the 1985–86 Nationalliga A. At the end of the season they suffered relegation, but the player remained with the club and in the following season they won the Nationalliga B championship, but missed promotion in the relegation/promotion play-offs. Eggeling was the team's second highest and the league's sixth highest goal scorer that season.

Eggeling joined FC Basel's first team for their 1987–88 season under head coach Urs Siegenthaler. After playing in five test games, Eggeling played his domestic league debut for the club in the away game on 8 August 1987 as Basel were defeated 2–0 by Aarau. He played with the club just this one season and they suffered relegation. During his time with them he played a total of 33 games for Basel scoring a total of nine goals. 20 of these games were in the Swiss Super League, one in the Swiss Cup and twelve were friendly games. He didn't score any goals in the domestic league nor in the cup, all nine were scored during the test games.

Eggeling left Basel and signed for FC Emmenbrücke. Three years later he signed for AC Bellinzona. Both teams played in the second tier of Swiss football.

== Sources ==
- Josef Zindel (2018). FC Basel 1893. Die ersten 125 Jahre (in German). Basel: Friedrich Reinhardt Verlag. ISBN 978-3-7245-2305-5.
- Rotblau: Jahrbuch Saison 2014/2015. Publisher: FC Basel Marketing AG. ISBN 978-3-7245-2027-6
- Verein "Basler Fussballarchiv" Homepage
