= 1989 Klötzli incident =

Incident in Swiss association football

On 7 October 1989, the referee blowing the final whistle just as a goal was scored in a game of football in Switzerland, and the following attack on him by the affected team's players, came to be known as the Klötzli incident. The episode, which occurred in a Nationalliga A match between FC Sion and FC Wettingen, is considered to be one of the biggest scandals in Swiss football.

== Background ==
In the third minute of injury time in a league match between Sion and Wettingen, Mirsad Baljic scored in the 88th minute to give Sion a 1–0 lead against Wettingen, who were fighting against relegation.

=== The incident ===
Sion's midfielder Jean-Paul Brigger took a free-kick just a few meters from his own box. Instead of kicking the ball, however, he wasted time, and as he took the free-kick, the ball hit Wettingen's Salvatore Romano on his back. The ball then fell at the feet of Wettingen's captain Martin Rueda, who ran with the ball and went round the goalkeeper Stephan Lehmann, equalising the score at 1–1. While the ball was in the air and heading towards the goal, however, referee Bruno Klötzli looked at his watch, not focusing on the ball, and noticed that the three-minutes of injury time were up. He blew the full-time whistle, and the game ended with the equalising goal not counted.

The Wettingen players were angry, and they directed their anger towards referee Klötzli. Four FCW players attacked him, and he was chased across the pitch. He fought his way towards the tunnel and into the referee's cabin, escaping the assault.

=== People involved ===
Klötzli, an SFV referee, who would have become a FIFA Referee in 1990, reported the case to the SFV. From his match report can be seen: player number 12 Martin Frei (the uncle of Alex Frei) attacked him by jumping into him with both feet. Player number 3 Alex Germann struck him with a punch on the shoulder and a second punch in the stomach. Player number 9 Reto Baumgartner jumped into his back with both knees. Player number 6 Roger Kundert kicked him in the buttocks.

== Statements ==
"I was very scared," Klötzli said after the game. "If I had stumbled, I would certainly have ended up in the hospital." He got away unharmed. Up until the moment of his whistle he said: "I made no mistakes in terms of control technology. But I have to admit that the moment of the final whistle was not exactly well chosen psychologically."

"Sure, I ran over to him," confessed Kundert. "Maybe I touched the referee in the crowd. But I definitely didn't kick him. Anything but two or three penalty Sundays would be a scandal." Baumgartner described the situation like this: "I was totally aggressive, capable of doing anything. But I couldn't even get near to him." Germann said: "I'm quite sure I didn't strike him." After the players had seen the video of the event, they showed more insight. "The scenes that happened there are inexcusable," says Kundert. Baumgarnter stated that both he and Klötzli made a mistake.

Even 30 years later, the then Sion team manager Yves Débonnaire states, "The anxious face of the poor referee Klötzli and the violence of the Wettinger players have burned into my brain. Forever."

== Consequences ==
On the basis of the video and the referee report, the SFV condemned the four players with extensive bans and fines. The Association Sports Court intensified the punishments and professional bans further. The professional ban for Roger Kundert was four months. The ban for Martin Frei began at six and increased to eight months and the ban for Reto Baumgartner began at seven and increased to ten months. The three players were fined 10,000 Swiss Francs each. Alex Germann, who was about complete a transfer to Borussia Dortmund, was hit the hardest, with a one-year suspension and a fine of CHF 20,000 Swiss francs.

=== Aftermath ===
Just seven weeks after the game in Sion, Roger Kundert tore a cruciate ligament during training. Because his right knee could no longer withstand the stress of professional sport, he retired from active football in the spring of 1990. The 30-year-old Martin Frei vented his anger, wrote the association bosses a sharp letter and decided to end his career immediately. Alex Germann trained for a year with FC Wettingen and then returned as a professional player, but the planned move to the Bundesliga club Borussia Dortmund was not completed.

Reto Baumgartner's contract with FC Wettingen expired. He continued his career with FC Basel, played for another four years in the Nationalliga B and he later became a professional beach soccer player. Since FC Basel's AGM in 2008, Baumgartner has been a member of the club's board of directors. At the club's annual general meeting in November 2020, he was elected as the new chairman.

Six months later, referee Klötzli ended his career as a referee. The Sion scandal was his last game at the professional level. Afterwards, he developed a gambling addiction. He had landed into debt and ran into problems with his job, which he then lost. In 1999, he was sentenced to a conditional prison term of 18 months for forgery and abuse of confidence. As a bank employee, Klötzli embezzled a total of CHF 800,000 between 1990 and 1993. The former referee now lives in seclusion in the canton of Jura, where he ran a restaurant with his wife. They retired at the end of 2017.

== Notes ==
=== Sources ===
- SFL glory "der Fall Klötzli"
- Blick.ch interview in German with Bruno Klötzli, including video
