= Gérard Castella =

Swiss footballer and manager (born 1953)

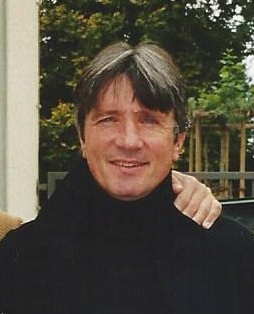

Personal information
- Date of birth: 2 May 1953 (age 73)
- Position: Midfielder

Senior career*
Years	Team	Apps	(Gls)
1970–1975	Servette		
1975–1977	CS Chênois		
1977–1979	Young Boys		
1979–1983	Lausanne-Sport		
1984–1985	Étoile Carouge FC		

Managerial career
- 1984–1985: Étoile Carouge FC (player-manager)
- 1985–1986: Vevey-Sports
- 1987–1989: Étoile Carouge FC
- 1990–1993: Urania Genève Sport
- 1997–1999: Servette
- 2000–2001: Étoile Carouge FC
- 2002: St. Gallen
- 2004–2006: Lausanne-Sport
- 2006–2008: Neuchâtel Xamax
- 2008–2009: Servette
- Switzerland U20
- Switzerland U19
- Switzerland U20
- Switzerland U18
- * Club domestic league appearances and goals

Gérard Castella (born 2 May 1953) is a Swiss football manager and former player who played as a midfielder.
