= Remo Steiner =

Swiss footballer (born 1968)

Personal information
- Full name: Remo Steiner
- Date of birth: 30 September 1968 (age 58)
- Place of birth: Switzerland
- Position: Forward

Youth career
- until 1986: FC Aesch

Senior career*
Years	Team	Apps	(Gls)
1986–1987	FC Aesch		
1987–1989	FC Basel	13	(3)
- * Club domestic league appearances and goals

Remo Steiner (born 30 September 1968) is a Swiss former footballer who played in the 1980s as a forward.

Steiner played his youth football with local club FC Aesch and advanced to their first team in the 1986–1987 season.

Steiner joined FC Basel's first team in their 1987–88 season under head-coach Urs Siegenthaler. After playing in three test games, Steiner played his domestic league debut for his new club in the home game in the St. Jakob Stadium on 12 September 1987 as Basel played against Zürich. He scored his first goal for his club in the same game. In fact he scored two, the team's first in the fourth minute and their second in the 28th, as Basel won 5–4.

At the end of the 1987–88 Nationalliga A season, Steiner and his team suffered relegation, but he stayed with the club for another season. In his two seasons with the club, Steiner played 17 games for Basel – 13 in the Nationalliga A and 4 friendly games – and scored three goals in the domestic league and one during the test games.

== Sources ==
- Die ersten 125 Jahre. Publisher: Josef Zindel im Friedrich Reinhardt Verlag, Basel. ISBN 978-3-7245-2305-5
- Verein "Basler Fussballarchiv" Homepage
