= Arch, Switzerland =

Arch
- Municipality
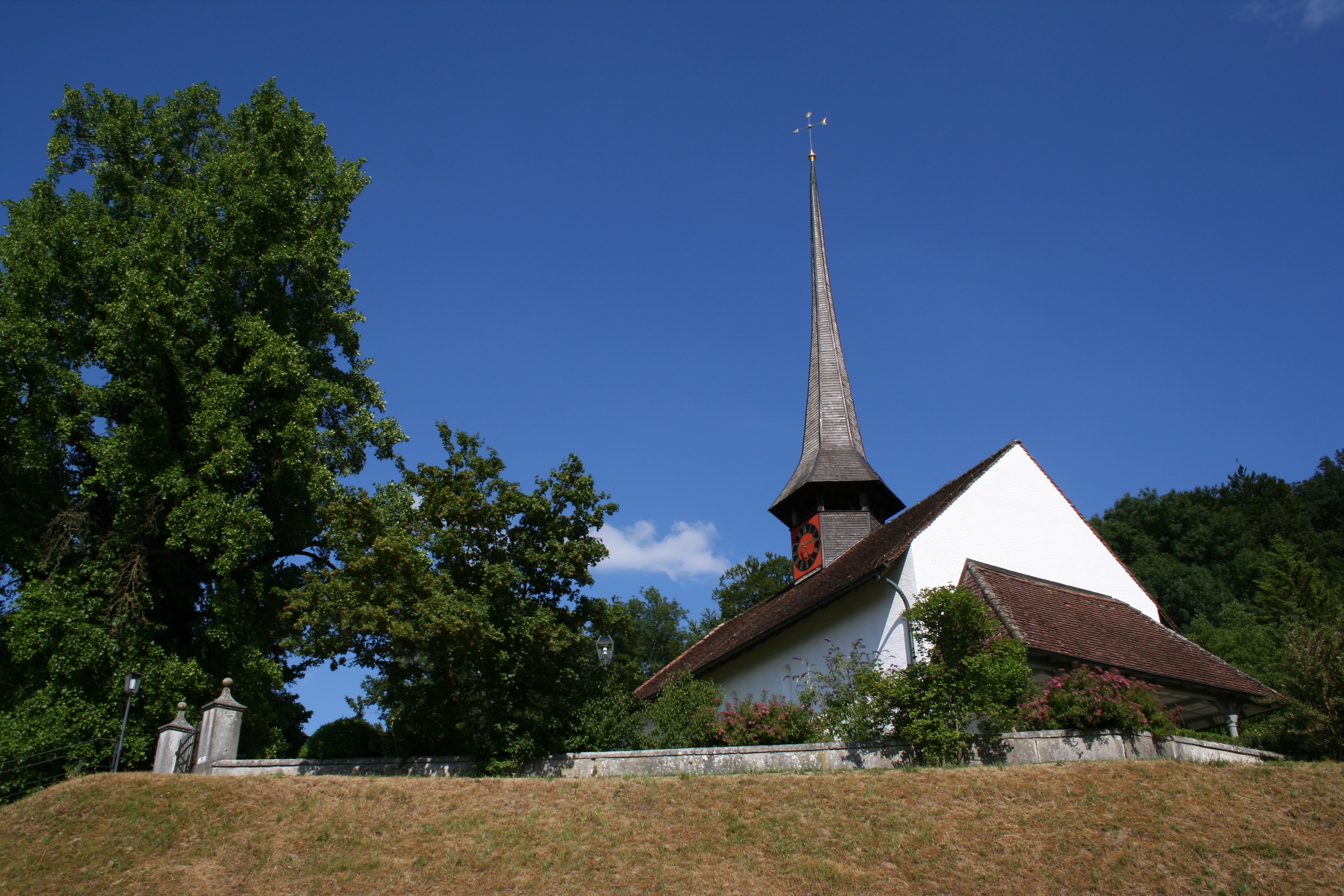
- Arch village Reformed Church

- Flag Coat of arms
- Location of Arch
- Location within Switzerland Location within Canton of Bern
- Coordinates: 47°10′N 7°26′E
- Country: Switzerland
- Canton: Bern
- District: Seeland

Area
  - Total: 6.4 km^{2} (2.5 sq mi)
- Elevation: 450 m (1,480 ft)

Population (December 2020)
  - Total: 1,700
  - Density: 270/km^{2} (690/sq mi)
- Time zone: UTC+01:00 (CET)
  - Summer (DST): UTC+02:00 (CEST)
- Postal code: 3296
- SFOS number: 381
- ISO 3166 code: CH-BE
- Surrounded by: Bettlach (SO), Bibern (SO), Grenchen (SO), Leuzigen, Rüti bei Büren
- Website: www.arch-be.ch

Arch is a municipality in the Seeland administrative district in the canton of Bern in Switzerland. It is also a church parish of the Swiss Reformed Church.

== History ==
The first historical mention of the town was in 1236 as Archo.

The earliest traces of human settlements around Arch include scattered neolithic items and Hallstatt culture grave mounds. During the Roman era Arch was on the Petinesca-Salodurum (Solothurn) road. During the High Middle Ages an earthen and wooden castle stood on the Schlosshubel or Maierislihubel. Originally it was part of the Herrschaft of Strassberg but in 1388 it was acquired by Bern. In 1393 it became part of the newly created bailiwick of Buren.

The village church was originally a romanesque structure which was built in the 10th century. The building was first mentioned in 1275. In 1528 it switched to the new religion during the Protestant Reformation, and two years later the choir was rebuilt.

In 1561, a ferry across the Aare was set up, though the village remained primarily agricultural. In the 19th century improving agricultural technology reduced the demand for agricultural workers and left many in the village without jobs. However, the Jura water correction of the late 19th century opened up new farming land. Further land reclamation projects took place in 1918-26 and 1980. The 1980 project also built the A5 motorway which helped connect the village with surrounding towns. The first bridge over the Aare at Arch was built in 1874. It was followed two years later with the Solothurn-Lyss railway line. The bridge and railroad opened up new job opportunities, first in the watch industry and later in various industries. During the 20th century several factories opened in Arch including gravel mining and metal processing (1942), a machinery factory (1966), construction equipment (1946), and suppliers to the watch industry. With all the factories, many workers commuted into Arch for work from the surrounding villages. Arch grew into a regional center and in 1972 the secondary school for the Ruti-Arch-Leuzigen district was built in Arch.

== Notable structures ==
In Arch there are two blocks of multi-family homes and one of single-family homes, built to conform with MINERGIE, a Swiss trademark for sustainable construction. Because of these buildings, the municipality is ranked third among the municipalities of the canton in energy awareness.

== Geography ==
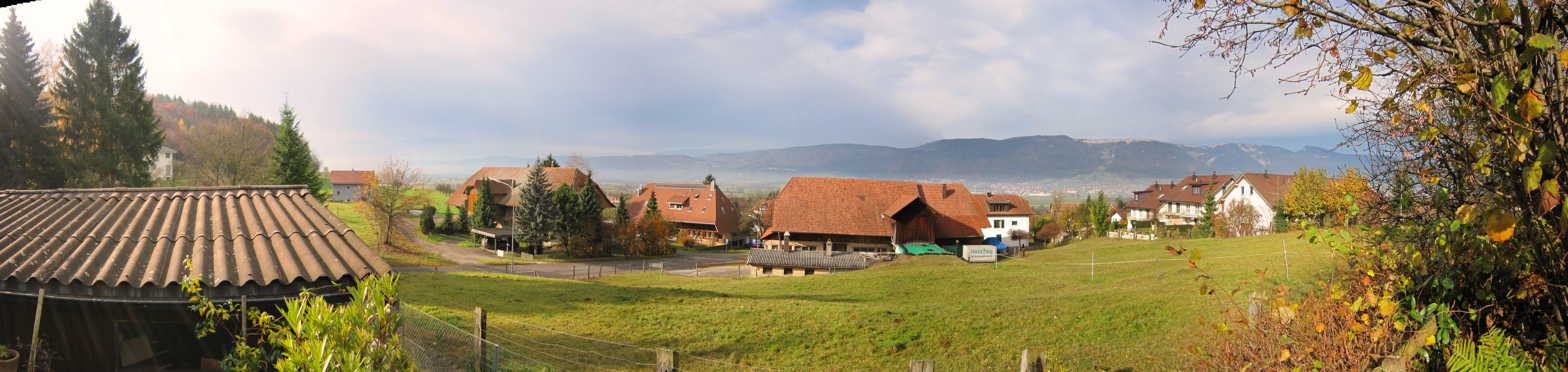
View of Arch Oberdorf

Aerial view by Walter Mittelholzer (1923)

Arch has an area of 6.38 km^{2} (2.46 sq mi). Of this area, 3.29 km^{2} (1.27 mi^{2}) or 51.6% is used for agricultural purposes, while 1.75 km^{2} (0.68 mi^{2}) or 27.5% is forested. Of the rest of the land, 1.02 km^{2} (0.39 mi^{2}) or 16.0% is settled (buildings or roads), 0.31 km^{2} (0.12 mi^{2}) or 4.9% is either rivers or lakes and 0.04 km^{2} (9.9 acres) or 0.6% is unproductive land.

Of the built up area, housing and buildings made up 6.3% and transportation infrastructure made up 6.4%. Power and water infrastructure as well as other special developed areas made up 2.4% of the area Out of the forested land, 25.9% of the total land area is heavily forested and 1.6% is covered with orchards or small clusters of trees. Of the agricultural land, 40.3% is used for growing crops and 10.0% is pastures, while 1.3% is used for orchards or vine crops. All the water in the municipality is flowing water.

The municipality is located on the right bank of the Aare River and is bordered on both the north and south by the Canton of Solothurn. It consists of the village of Arch (divided into Oberdorf, Unterdorf and Ausserdorf), the neighborhoods of Aebnit, Breiten and Leimacher-Mätteli as well as the Sibenmatt and Berghof farms.

On 31 December 2009 Amtsbezirk Büren, the municipality's former district, was dissolved. On the following day, 1 January 2010, it joined the newly created Verwaltungskreis Seeland.

== Coat of arms ==
The blazon of the municipal coat of arms is Azure on a base wavy Argent the Ark Or and in chief a Dove Argent volant holding in beak an Olive branch proper. This is an example of canting arms with the ark (German: Arche).

== Demographics ==
Arch has a population (as of December 2020) of 1,700. As of 2010, 8.0% of the population are resident foreign nationals. Over the last 10 years (2000-2010) the population has changed at a rate of -2.5%. Migration accounted for -2.7%, while births and deaths accounted for 1.2%.

Most of the population (as of 2000) speaks German (1,502 or 94.6%) as their first language, French is the second most common (24 or 1.5%) and Italian is the third (9 or 0.6%).

As of 2008, the population was 49.6% male and 50.4% female. The population was made up of 692 Swiss men (45.2% of the population) and 67 (4.4%) non-Swiss men. There were 716 Swiss women (46.8%) and 5 (0.3%) non-Swiss women. Of the population in the municipality, 445 or about 28.0% were born in Arch and lived there in 2000. There were 506 or 31.9% who were born in the same canton, while 451 or 28.4% were born somewhere else in Switzerland, and 135 or 8.5% were born outside of Switzerland.

As of 2010, children and teenagers (0–19 years old) make up 21.4% of the population, while adults (20–64 years old) make up 63.4% and seniors (over 64 years old) make up 15.2%.

As of 2000, there were 639 people who were single and never married in the municipality. There were 803 married individuals, 68 widows or widowers and 78 individuals who are divorced.

As of 2000, there were 162 households that consist of only one person and 46 households with five or more people. In 2000, a total of 618 apartments (92.4% of the total) were permanently occupied, while 26 apartments (3.9%) were seasonally occupied and 25 apartments (3.7%) were empty. As of 2010, the construction rate of new housing units was 2 new units per 1000 residents. The vacancy rate for the municipality, in 2011, was 2.66%.

The historical population is given in the following chart:

== Politics ==
In the 2011 federal election the most popular party was the SVP which received 35.6% of the vote. The next three most popular parties were the BDP Party (29.2%), the SPS (12%) and the Green Party (6.3%). In the federal election, a total of 471 votes were cast, and the voter turnout was 40.5%.

== Economy ==
As of 2011, Arch had an unemployment rate of 1.07%. As of 2008, there were a total of 570 people employed in the municipality. Of these, there were 36 people employed in the primary economic sector and about 14 businesses involved in this sector. 317 people were employed in the secondary sector and there were 31 businesses in this sector. 217 people were employed in the tertiary sector, with 47 businesses in this sector.

In 2008 there were a total of 475 full-time equivalent jobs. The number of jobs in the primary sector was 24, all of which were in agriculture. The number of jobs in the secondary sector was 292 of which 265 or (90.8%) were in manufacturing, 5 or (1.7%) were in mining and 22 (7.5%) were in construction. The number of jobs in the tertiary sector was 159. In the tertiary sector; 48 or 30.2% were in wholesale or retail sales or the repair of motor vehicles, 25 or 15.7% were in the movement and storage of goods, 10 or 6.3% were in a hotel or restaurant, 2 or 1.3% were in the information industry, 4 or 2.5% were technical professionals or scientists, 19 or 11.9% were in education and 36 or 22.6% were in health care.

In 2000, there were 290 workers who commuted into the municipality and 614 workers who commuted away. The municipality is a net exporter of workers, with about 2.1 workers leaving the municipality for every one entering. Of the working population, 10.8% used public transportation to get to work, and 61.5% used a private car.

== Religion ==
From the 2000 census, 249 or 15.7% were Roman Catholic, while 1,078 or 67.9% belonged to the Swiss Reformed Church. Of the rest of the population, there were 4 members of an Orthodox church (or about 0.25% of the population), there were 3 individuals (or about 0.19% of the population) who belonged to the Christian Catholic Church, and there were 75 individuals (or about 4.72% of the population) who belonged to another Christian church. There was 1 individual who was Jewish, and 24 (or about 1.51% of the population) who were Islamic. There were 4 individuals who were Buddhist and 18 individuals who were Hindu. 128 (or about 8.06% of the population) belonged to no church, are agnostic or atheist, and 41 individuals (or about 2.58% of the population) did not answer the question.

== Education ==
In Arch about 710 or (44.7%) of the population have completed non-mandatory upper secondary education, and 128 or (8.1%) have completed additional higher education (either university or a Fachhochschule). Of the 128 who completed tertiary schooling, 74.2% were Swiss men, 21.1% were Swiss women, 3.9% were non-Swiss men.

The Canton of Bern school system provides one year of non-obligatory Kindergarten, followed by six years of Primary school. This is followed by three years of obligatory lower Secondary school where the students are separated according to ability and aptitude. Following the lower Secondary students may attend additional schooling or they may enter an apprenticeship.

During the 2009-10 school year, there were a total of 232 students attending classes in Arch. There were 2 kindergarten classes with a total of 29 students in the municipality. Of the kindergarten students, 3.4% were permanent or temporary residents of Switzerland (not citizens) and 13.8% have a different mother language than the classroom language. The municipality had 6 primary classes and 105 students. Of the primary students, 6.7% were permanent or temporary residents of Switzerland (not citizens) and 4.8% have a different mother language than the classroom language. During the same year, there were 6 lower secondary classes with a total of 98 students. There were 5.1% who were permanent or temporary residents of Switzerland (not citizens) and 4.1% have a different mother language than the classroom language.

As of 2000, there were 83 students in Arch who came from another municipality, while 85 residents attended schools outside the municipality.
