= Marco Filomeno =

Italian footballer

Personal information
- Date of birth: 8 June 1965 (age 61)
- Place of birth: Zürich, Switzerland
- Height: 1.75 m (5 ft 9 in)
- Position: Forward

Senior career*
Years	Team	Apps	(Gls)
1985–1988	FC Schaffhausen		
1988–1989	FC St. Gallen		
1989–1990	FC Winterthur		
1990–1991	FC Schaffhausen		

Managerial career
- 1997–1998: SV Schaffhausen
- 1999–2000: FC Schaffhausen
- * Club domestic league appearances and goals

Marco Filomeno (born 8 June 1965) is a retired Italian football forward and later manager.
