= Jean-Michel Aeby =

Swiss footballer and manager (born 1966)

Personal information
- Date of birth: 23 May 1966 (age 60)
- Position: Midfielder

Senior career*
Years	Team	Apps	(Gls)
1984–1986	Étoile Carouge		
1986–1988	Bellinzona		
1988–1991	Lausanne-Sport		
1991–1996	Servette		
1996–1998	Étoile Carouge		
1998–1999	Meyrin		
1999–2000	Chênois		

International career
1991	Switzerland	3	(1)

Managerial career
- 2000–2002: Chênois
- 2002–2005: Meyrin
- 2005–2008: Servette
- 2009–2010: Neuchâtel Xamax (coach)
- 2010: Neuchâtel Xamax
- 2011–2012: Stade Nyonnais
- 2012: Étoile Carouge
- 2012–2013: Servette (coach)
- 2013–2014: Servette
- 2014–2015: Biel-Bienne
- 2015–2017: Lancy
- 2017–2019: Étoile Carouge
- 2019–2021: Yverdon-Sport
- 2021–2022: Bellinzona
- 2022–2023: Biel-Bienne
- 2023–2025: Grand-Saconnex
- * Club domestic league appearances and goals

Jean-Michel Aeby (born 23 May 1966) is a Swiss football manager and a former player.

== Coaching career ==
Aeby was hired by Bellinzona on 26 August 2021. He resigned from the club on 19 April 2022, despite the club in promotion position at the time.
