= Eduardo Nazar =

Chilean footballer (born 1961)

Personal information
- Full name: Eduardo Alejandro Nazar Clavería
- Date of birth: March 1, 1961 (age 65)
- Place of birth: Santiago, Chile
- Position: Attacking midfielder

Youth career
- Universidad Católica

Senior career*
Years	Team	Apps	(Gls)
1979–1984	Universidad Católica	2	(0)
1983–1984	→ Unión San Felipe (loan)	50	(13)
1985–1986	Palestino	0	(0)
1985	→ Logroñés (loan)	8	(2)
1985	→ Unión San Felipe (loan)	23	(9)
1986–1987	Deportes Concepción	31	(11)
1987–1988	FC Aarau	29	(6)
1988–1989	Étoile Carouge		
1989–1990	Naval	24	(10)
1990	Deportes Concepción	7	(6)
1991	Rangers		
1992	Deportes Concepción	8	(2)

Managerial career
- 1993: Santiago Morning (assistant)
- * Club domestic league appearances and goals

Eduardo Alejandro Nazar Clavería (born 1 March 1961) is a Chilean former footballer who played as an attacking midfielder for clubs in Chile, Spain and Switzerland.

== Club career ==
A product of Universidad Católica youth system, Nazar made two appearances in the Chilean top division in 1979. In 1980, he took part in the Croix International Tournament with the youth team, alongside fellows such as Fernando Díaz, Juvenal Olmos and Patricio Mardones, where they became champion. After having little chance to play at the league, he was loaned to Unión San Felipe from 1984 to 1985.

After joining Palestino, he was loaned to Spanish side Logroñés and Unión San Felipe again in 1985. For Logroñés, he made eight appearances and scored two goals in the Segunda División.

Having played for Deportes Concepción in 1986 and 1987, he returned to Europe and played for FC Aarau, scoring in his debut, and Étoile Carouge in Switzerland.

Back in Chile, he played for Naval, Deportes Concepción and Rangers de Talca.

== Coaching career ==
In 2005 he graduated as a football manager at the INAF (National Football Institute) alongside former players such as Fernando Astengo, José Cantillana, Eduardo Soto, among others.

Previously, he had served as assistant of Raúl Toro in Santiago Morning.

== Honours ==
Universidad Católica

- Croix International Tournament: 1980
