= John Linford =

English footballer

Personal information
- Full name: John Russell Linford
- Date of birth: 6 December 1957 (age 68)
- Place of birth: Norwich, England
- Position: Striker

Youth career
- Gorleston

Senior career*
Years	Team	Apps	(Gls)
1981–1983	Ipswich Town	0	(0)
1983	Colchester United	7	(0)
1983	Southend United	6	(3)
1983–1984	DS '79	7	(4)
1984	Birmingham City	2	(0)
1984–1985	NAC Breda	18	(7)
1985–1987	Fortuna Sittard	50	(24)
1987	FC Zürich	7	(2)
1988–1989	FC Utrecht	23	(7)
–	Go Ahead Eagles		
–	FC Dordrecht		
–	ADO Den Haag	22	(21)
- * Club domestic league appearances and goals

John Russell Linford (born 6 December 1957) is an English former footballer who played in England for Gorleston, Ipswich Town, Colchester United, Southend United and Birmingham City, in the Netherlands for Fortuna Sittard, NAC Breda, FC Utrecht, Go Ahead Eagles, FC Dordrecht and ADO Den Haag, and in Switzerland for FC Zürich.
