= Stephan Lehmann =

Swiss footballer and manager (born 1963)

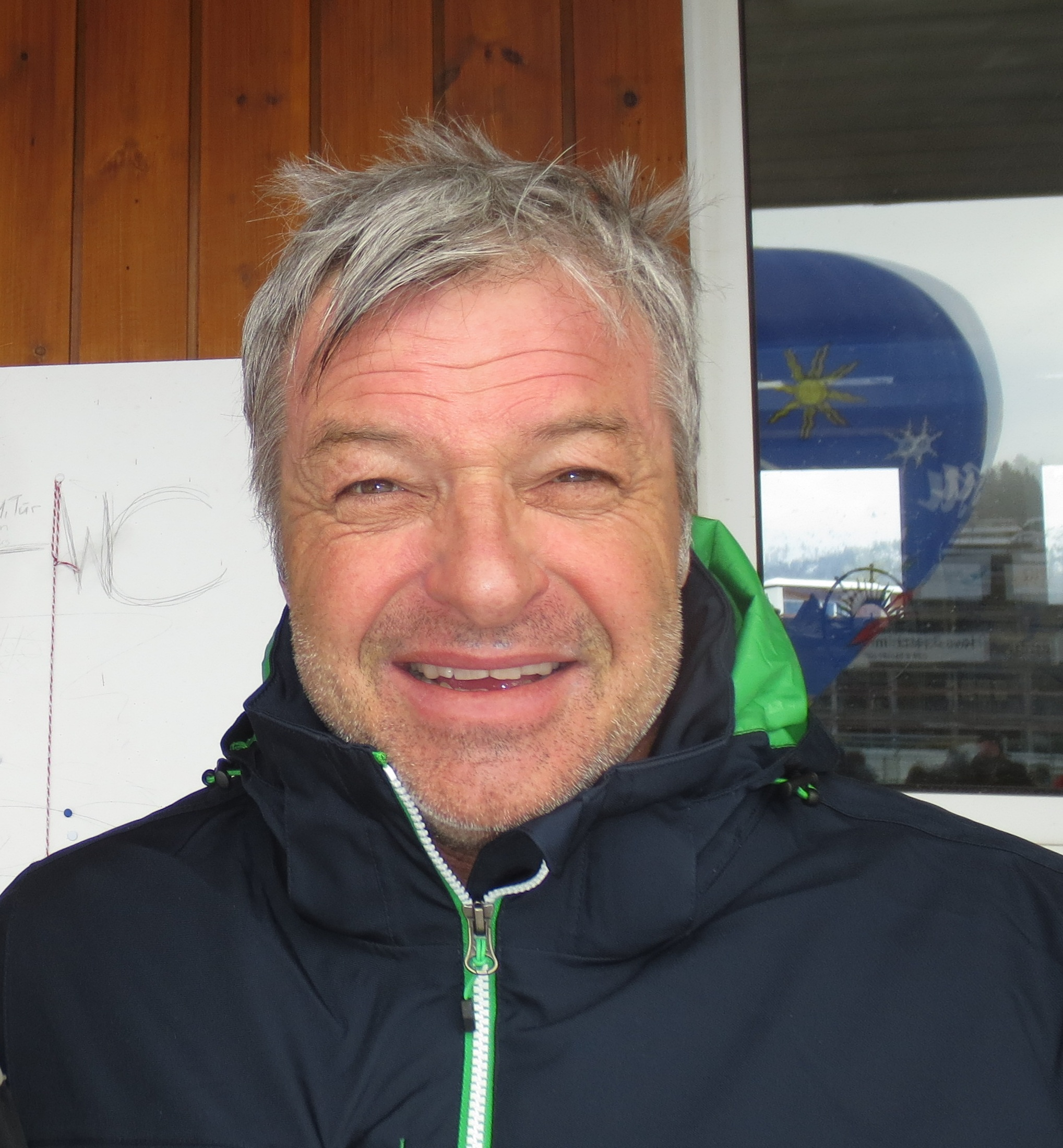
- Lehmann in 2013

Personal information
- Date of birth: 15 August 1963 (age 63)
- Place of birth: Schaffhausen, Switzerland
- Height: 1.75 m (5 ft 9 in)
- Position: Goalkeeper

Team information
- Current team: Sion

Youth career
- –1983: Carl Zeiss Jena

Senior career*
Years	Team	Apps	(Gls)
1983–1984	Schaffhausen	36	(0)
1984–1986	Winterthur	70	(0)
1986–1987	SC Freiburg	1	(0)
1987–1988	Schaffhausen	36	(0)
1988–1997	Sion	324	(0)
1997–1999	FC Luzern	71	(0)
Total		538	(0)

International career
1986–1989	Switzerland U21	36	(0)
1989–1997	Switzerland	14	(0)

Managerial career
- 1999–2000: FC Luzern (Goalkeeper coach)
- 1999–2002: Swiss U-21 (Goalkeeper coach)
- 2003–2004: FC Wil (Assistant and Goalkeeper coach)
- 2003–2004: St. Gallen (Goalkeeper coach)
- 2004–2005: Grasshopper Club Zürich (Goalkeeper coach)
- 2005–2006: FC Luzern (Assistant and Goalkeeper coach)
- 2006–2007: FC Aarau (Assistant and Goalkeeper coach)
- 2008: Vaduz (Goalkeeper coach)
- 2009: Carl Zeiss Jena (Assistant, goal and Incentive coach)
- 2009–2012: FC Luzern (Goalkeeper coach)
- 2012–: Sion (Goalkeeper coach)
- * Club domestic league appearances and goals

Stephan Lehmann (born 15 August 1963) is a Swiss former professional football goalkeeper who works as goalkeeper coach for FC Sion.

== International career ==
Lehmann was capped 18 times for the Switzerland national team between 1989 and 1997. He was an unused substitute at the 1994 FIFA World Cup and was in the Euro 1996 squad.

== Honours ==
FC Sion

- Swiss Cup: 1990–91, 1994–95, 1995–96, 1996–97
- Swiss Super League: 1991–92, 1996–97
