= Martin Müller (footballer, born 1957) =

Swiss footballer (born 1957)

Personal information
- Date of birth: 28 January 1957 (age 69)
- Height: 1.78 m (5 ft 10 in)
- Position: Forward

Senior career*
Years	Team	Apps	(Gls)
1977–1978	Young Fellows Zürich		
1978–1979	Neuchâtel Xamax		
1979–1984	FC Aarau		
1984–1985	Grasshopper Club		
1985–1990	FC Luzern		
1990–1992	FC Aarau		

Managerial career
- 1997–1998: FC Luzern
- * Club domestic league appearances and goals

Martin Müller (born 28 January 1957) is a retired Swiss football striker.
