= 1988–89 Swiss Cup =

Tournament details
- Country: Switzerland
- Teams: 196

Final positions
- Champions: Grasshopper Club
- Runners-up: Aarau

Tournament statistics
- Matches played: 195

The 1988–89 Swiss Cup was the 64th season of Switzerland's annual football cup competition organised by the Swiss Football Association. The first round began on 13 August and ended on 15 May 1989 with the Final held at Wankdorf, Bern. The cup winners earned a place in the first round of the Cup Winners' Cup.

== Overview ==
The competition began on the week-end 13–14 August 1988 with the first games of Round 1 and ended on Whit Monday 15 May 1989 with the final held at the former Wankdorf Stadium in Bern. The 24 clubs from the Nationalliga B were granted byes for the first round. The 12 clubs from the Nationalliga A were granted byes for the first two rounds. The winners of the cup qualified themselves for the first round of the Cup Winners' Cup in the next season.

The draw was respecting regionalities, when possible, and the lower classed team was granted home advantage. In the entire competition, the matches were played in a single knockout format. In the event of a draw after 90 minutes, the match went into extra time. In the event of a draw at the end of extra time, a penalty shoot-out was to decide which team qualified for the next round. No replays were foreseen.

== Round 1 ==
In the first round a total of 160 clubs participated from the third-tier and lower. Reserve teams were not admitted to the competition.

=== Summary ===
Team 1	Score	Team 2
13–14 August 1988
FC Stade Payerne	1–1 (a.e.t.) (5–4 p)	FC Moudon
FC Versoix	0–3	Fribourg
FC Aïre-le-Lignon	3–4	Folgore Lausanne
CS La Tour-de-Peilz	2–5	FC Aigle
FC Agarn	2–4	FC Leytron
FC Morat	1–4	Colombier
FC Prangins	0–4	Stade Lausanne
FC Superga (NE)	3–0	FC Cortaillod
FC Fully	3–1	Vevey Sports
FC Bramois	0–3	FC Raron
WEF Bern	3–5	Thun
FC Allschwil	0–6	FC Suhr
FC Oftringen	2–3	FC Oensingen
FC Brugg	2–1	FC Frick
FC Bremgarten	1–0	FC Pratteln
FC Saignelégier	0–6	Moutier
FC Courtemaîche	0–4	FC Le Locle
FC Gerlafingen	3–2	Köniz
US Morobbia-Giubiasco	3–0 (a.e.t.)	FC Tresa
FC Brunnen	0–1	FC Morbio
FC Effretikon	6–0	FC Küsnacht (ZH)
FC Wädenswil	1–1 (a.e.t.) (4–3 p)	FC Embrach
FC Root	1–4	FC Zug
FC Gunzwil	1–5	Buochs
FC Hergiswil	1–3	FC Muri
FC Au-Heerbrugg	1–1 (a.e.t.) (3–4 p)	FC Bad Ragaz
FC Buttikon	2–13	Tuggen
FC Altbüron	0–2	Kriens
FC Corcelles	0–2	FC Boudry
FC Marly	1–2	Monthey
Signal FC (Bernex)	2–1	FC Vernier
Lancy-Sports	2–4	US Meinier GE
US Collombey-Muraz	6–0	FC Puidoux-Chêbres
FC Farvagny	3–10	FC Châtel-St-Denis
FC Brig	3–4	FC Savièse
FC Pully	0–2	Grand-Lancy
FC Bottens	1–3	FC Echichens
FC Donneloye	1–4	Central Fribourg
FC Portalban	2–1	FC Domdidier
Bex	2–1	FC Conthey
FC Saint-Blaise	2–1 (a.e.t.)	Echallens
SV Sissach	0–1	FC Rapid Ostermundigen
FC Oberwil	4–2	FC Therwil
FC Härkingen	1–2	FC Olten
FC Bettlach	0–1	SV Lyss
FC Bassecourt	4–3 (a.e.t.)	FC Azzurri Bienne
FC Aarberg	2–3	FC Breitenbach
FC Dornach	0–3	FC Klus-Balsthal
FC Grünstern (Ipsach)	2–1	TT Bern
Italia Bern	0–3	FC Beauregard Fribourg
FC Langenthal	3–1	SC Baudepartement Basel
FC Bözingen 34	0–4	Delémont
FC Mett	2–7	Burgdorf
FC Zollbrück	1–2	FC Dürrenast
FC Sarmenstorf	2–2 (a.e.t.) (5–4 p)	Wohlen
FC Spiez	1–9	Solothurn
FC Lerchenfeld (Thun)	4–0	Bern
FC Rheinfelden	0–4	Laufen
AC Sementina	2–3	FC Ascona
Losone Sportiva	0–2	FC Altdorf (Uri)
GC Biaschesi	1–1 (a.e.t.) (4–5 p)	Mendrisio
FC Rebstein	1–3	FC Altstätten (St. Gallen)
Young Fellows	0–2	FC Dübendorf
FC Tägerwilen	2–4	FC Töss (Winterthur)
Arbon	0–2	Herisau
FC Rüti	0–3	Bülach
FC Schwamendingen	2–0	FC Stäfa
FC Flawil	3–4	Frauenfeld
Balzers	1–0	FC Landquart
FC Schwarz-Weiss Zürich	1–2	Red Star
FC Rotkreuz	3–4	FC Sursee
FC Witikon (ZH)	0–5	FC Kilchberg
SV Schaffhausen	0–3	FC Beringen
Luzerner Sportclub	1–5	FC Einsielden
FC Münchwilen	1–4	FC Rorschach
FC Wülflingen	2–6	Vaduz
FC Wetzikon	3–1	FC Brüttisellen
FC Hochdorf	2–0	SC Goldau
Interclub Zurigo	1–0	FC Seefeld Zürich
FC Heiden	0–5	FC Amriswil

== Round 2 ==
=== Summary ===
Team 1	Score	Team 2
20–21 August 1988
Monthey	0–4	FC Renens
FC Raron	1–0 (a.e.t.)	Martigny-Sports
US Collombey-Muraz	0–5	Montreux-Sports
FC Oberwil	0–5	Basel
FC Sursee	0–4	SC Zug
FC Echichens	2–5	Etoile Carouge
FC Stade Payerne	0–2	Yverdon-Sports
Moutier	2–3	Biel-Bienne
FC Leytron	1–2	ES Malley
FC Sarmenstorf	0–2	Old Boys
FC Kilchberg	0–4	Winterthur
FC Beringen	2–3	Chur
Buochs	1–1 (a.e.t.) (4–2 p)	Chiasso
Delémont	4–3 (a.e.t.)	La Chaux-de-Fonds
FC Dübendorf	0–2	FC Schaffhausen
FC Boudry	0–7	Bulle
FC Bad Ragaz	1–3	FC Glarus
Kriens	2–2 (a.e.t.) (4–5 p)	Emmenbrücke
FC Savièse	5–1	Urania Genève Sport
Folgore Lausanne	0–1	Chênois
FC Saint-Blaise	0–3	Grenchen
FC Einsielden	1–6	Locarno
FC Rorschach	0–8	Zürich
FC Bremgarten	2–3	Baden
Grand-Lancy	3–2	FC Aigle
FC Fully	2–3	FC Châtel-St-Denis
FC Klus-Balsthal	1–2	Laufen
Burgdorf	1–1 (a.e.t.) (5–4 p)	FC Suhr
FC Altdorf (Uri)	3–1	FC Ascona
Mendrisio	2–0	SC Zug
Signal FC (Bernex)	2–3	Stade Lausanne
FC Bassecourt	0–4	Colombier
Fribourg	3–2	Central Fribourg
Brugg	2–0	FC Rapid Ostermundigen
FC Langenthal	4–2	FC Muri
FC Oensingen	1–2	FC Olten
FC Morbio	2–2 (a.e.t.) (3–4 p)	Tuggen
FC Beauregard Fribourg	2–1	FC Le Locle
FC Gerlafingen	1–2	Solothurn
Dürrenast	0–3	SV Lyss
FC Lerchenfeld (Thun)	1–0	FC Breitenbach
FC Grünstern (Ipsach)	0–9	Thun
Balzers	1–2	Vaduz
FC Wädenswil	1–2	Red Star
FC Wetzikon	1–1 (a.e.t.) (1–4 p)	FC Altstätten (St. Gallen)
FC Töss (Winterthur)	1–0	Herisau
Bex	4–2	US Meinier GE
FC Hochdorf	1–1 (a.e.t.) (5–4 p)	US Morobbia-Giubiasco
Bülach	1–0	FC Schwamendingen
Interclub Zurigo	2–3	Frauenfeld
FC Portalban	3–3 (a.e.t.) (4–3 p)	FC Superga (NE)
FC Effretikon	0–1	FC Amriswil

=== Matches ===
20 August 1988
19:30

FC Oberwil	0–5	Basel
Eichenberger (yellow card) 1'	FCB summary	22' (0:1) Esposito; 32' (0:2) Rahmen; 76' (0:3) Baumann; 79' (pen. 0:4) Dittus; 83' (0:5) Aebi

Sportanlage Eisweiher, Oberwil
Attendance: 1,800
Referee: (Switzerland) Peter Bochsler (Basel)

20 August 1988

FC Rorschach	0–8	Zürich
	FCZ summary	7' (0:1) Studer; 24' (0:2) Müller; 43' (0:3) Landolt; 48' (0:4) Gilli; 57' (0:5) Şahin; 59' (0:6) Maiano; 82' (0:7) Răducanu; 89' (0:8) Landolt

Sportplatz Pestalozzi, Rorschach
Attendance: 1,500
Referee: (Switzerland) Gritsch (Schaanwald)

== Round 3 ==
=== Summary ===
Team 1	Score	Team 2
3 September 1988
Red Star	0–6	Grasshopper Club
Tuggen	1–2	Luzern
Grand-Lancy	0–2	Sion
Thun	3–1	FC Suhr
Buochs	0–1	Bellinzona
SV Lyss	1–2	Wettingen
US Morobbia-Giubiasco	2–3	Mendrisio
Old Boys	1–2 (a.e.t.)	Aarau
FC Savièse	2–4	Yverdon-Sports
Biel-Bienne	0–1	Étoile-Carouge
ES Malley	2–0	Chênois
Brugg	3–2 (a.e.t.)	FC Langenthal
Basel	4–1	Young Boys
Delémont	2–1	Montreux-Sports
FC Raron	0–2	Lausanne-Sport
FC Renens	1–5	Xamax
Zürich	1–2	St. Gallen
Fribourg	0–6	Servette
Locarno	0–2	Lugano
4 September 1988
FC Töss (Winterthur)	1–0	Chur
Laufen	1–4	Solothurn
Frauenfeld	1–2	FC Schaffhausen
Vaduz (Liechtenstein)	1–3	FC Glarus
FC Altdorf (Uri)	1–3	FC Olten
Bex	2–5	FC Beauregard Fribourg
Colombier	2–4	Stade Lausanne
FC Portalban	0–6	Grenchen
FC Altstätten (St. Gallen)	1–4	Winterthur
Bülach	1–1 (a.e.t.) (2–4 p)	FC Amriswil
FC Châtel-St-Denis	0–2	Bulle
FC Lerchenfeld (Thun)	1–4	Baden
SC Zug	4–1	Emmenbrücke

=== Matches ===
3 September 1988

Red Star	0–6	Grasshopper Club
	RSSSF summary	5' (0:1) Stiel; 20' (0:2) Andermatt; 35' (0:3) Andermatt; 43' (0:4) Paulo César; 66' (0:5) Rufer; 85' (0:6) Ugras

Allmend Brunau, Zürich

3 September 1988

Old Boys	1–2 (a.e.t.)	Aarau
Hauck 56' (pen. 1:1)	FCA summary	7' (0:1) van der Gijp; 104' (1:2) Barth

Stadion Schützenmatte, Basel
Attendance: 1,200
Referee: (Switzerland) René Kellenberger (Herisau)

3 September 1988
20:00

Basel	4–1	Young Boys
Esposito 8' (1:0); Baumann (yellow card) 29'; Brügger (yellow card) 45'; Hodel 53' (2:1); Thoma 55' (3:2); Hodel (yellow card) 57'; Dittus 81' (4:1)	FCB summary	(yellow card) 31' Limpar; 48' (1:1) Zuffi; (yellow card) 63' Rapolder

St. Jakob Stadium, Basel
Attendance: 6,000
Referee: (Switzerland) Arturo Martino (Neukirch an der Thur)

3 September 1988

Zürich	1–2	St. Gallen
Fischer (yellow card) 8'; Şahin 10' (1:0)	FCZ summary	(yellow card) 36' Metzler; 64' (1:1) Piserchia; 73' (1:2) Braschler; (yellow card) Braschler

Letzigrund, Zürich
Attendance: 5,200
Referee: (Switzerland) Franz Gächter (Aarau, Suhr, Aargau)

3 September 1988

Fribourg	0–6	Servette
	Servette summary	23' (pen.) Eriksen; 38' (0:2) Sinval; 64' (0:3) Kok; 70' (0:4) Bonvin; 83' (0:5) Grossenbacher; 86' (0:6) Bamert

Stade Universitaire Saint-Léonard, Fribourg

== Round 4 ==
=== Summary ===
Team 1	Score	Team 2
12 November 1988
ES Malley	2–1 (a.e.t.)	Bulle
Delémont	1–0	Étoile-Carouge
FC Solothurn	0–1	Grenchen
Servette	0–2	Xamax
13 November 1988
FC Töss (Winterthur)	0–1 (a.e.t.)	Basel
FC Amriswil	0–4	Bellinzona
Thun	2–6	Baden
FC Beauregard Fribourg	0–9	Sion
FC Glarus	0–2	FC Schaffhausen
Grasshopper Club	2–1	St. Gallen
Lugano	2–1	Wettingen
Mendrisio	0–2 (a.e.t.)	Winterthur
Stade Lausanne	0–5	Lausanne-Sport
Yverdon-Sport	2–4 (a.e.t.)	Aarau
FC Brugg	0–4	FC Olten
SC Zug	0–2	Luzern

=== Matches ===
12 November 1988

ES Malley	2–1 (a.e.t.)	Bulle
Bitscnau 75' (1:0); 106' (2:1) Mann	RSSSF summary	83' (1:1) Fluri

Centre sportif de la Tuilière, Lausanne, Malley

12 November 1988

Delémont	1–0	Étoile-Carouge
Muster 25' (1:0)	RSSSF summary

La Blancherie, Delémont

12 November 1988

FC Solothurn	0–1	Grenchen
	RSSSF summary	Ciołek

Stadion FC Solothurn, Solothurn

12 November 1988

Servette	0–2	Xamax
	Servette summary	20' (1:0) Smajic; 77' (2:0) Decastel

Charmilles Stadium, Geneva

13 November 1988
10:00

FC Töss (Winterthur)	0–1 (a.e.t.)	Basel
Moor (yellow card) 28'; Hofmann (yellow card) 44'	FCB Summary	107' (0:1) Bernauer; (yellow card) 112' Fanciulli

Reitplatz, Winterthur
Attendance: 1,200
Referee: (Switzerland) Kurt Röthlisberger (Suhr)

13 November 1988

FC Amriswil	0–4	Bellinzona
	RSSSF summary	53' (0:1) Türkyilmaz; 56' (0:2) Türkyilmaz; 67' (0:3) Türkyilmaz; 88' (0:4) Zbinden

Tellenfeld, Amriswil

13 November 1988

Thun	2–6	Baden
Streun 60' (1:3); Zahnd 75' (2:5)	RSSSF summary	5' (0:1) Zaugg; 11' (0:2) Zaugg; 21' (0:3); 66' (1:4) Schneider; 70' (1:5) Schneider; 79' (2:6) Zanobio

Stadion Lachen, Thun

13 November 1988
14:30

FC Beauregard Fribourg	0–9	Sion
	RSSSF summary	3' (0:1) Cina; 13' (0:2) Brigger; 37' (0:3) Brigger; 43' (0:4) Cina; 50' (0:5) Cina; 58' (0:6) Balet; 70' (0:7) Albertoni; 72' (0:8) Brigger; 77' (0:9) Albertoni

Guintzet, Fribourg

13 November 1988

FC Glarus	0–2	FC Schaffhausen
	RSSSF summary	50' (0:1) Thoma; 90' (0:2) Bacher

Buchholz, Glarus

13 November 1988

Grasshopper Club	2–1	St. Gallen
Koller 77' (1:1); Paulo César 86' (pen. 2:1)	RSSSF summary	94' (0:1) Metzler

Hardturm, Zürich

13 November 1988

Lugano	2–1	Wettingen
Elia 57' (1:1); Leva 71' (2:1)	RSSSF summary	41' (0:1) Peterhans

Cornaredo, Lugano

13 November 1988

Mendrisio	0–2 (a.e.t.)	Winterthur
	RSSSF summary	105' (0:1) Güntensperger; 118' (0:2) Hutka

Centro Sportivo Comunale, Mendrisio

13 November 1988

Stade Lausanne	0–5	Lausanne-Sport
	RSSSF summary	13' (0:1) Herr; 23' (0:2) Schürmann; 43' (pen.) Bregy; 67' (0:4) Antognoni; 46' (0:5) Aeby

Olympique de la Pontaise, Lausanne

13 November 1988

Yverdon-Sport	2–4 (a.e.t.)	Aarau
Ruchat 14' (1:0); Ruchat 25' (2:0)	FCA summary	47' (2:1) Barth; 75' (2:2) Osterwalder; 95' (pen.) Herberth; 109' (2:4) Knup

Stadion Brügglifeld, Aarau
Attendance: 4,500
Referee: (Switzerland) Serge Muhmenthaler (Grenchen)

13 November 1988

FC Brugg	0–4	FC Olten
	RSSSF summary	8' (0:1) Grütter; 28' (0:2) Nocita; 87' (0:3) Nocita; 90' (0:4) Nocita

Stadion Au, Brugg

13 November 1988

SC Zug	0–2	Luzern
	RSSSF summary	40' (0:1) Nadig; 57' (0:2) Burri

Herti Allmend Stadion, Zug

== Round 5 ==
=== Summary ===
Team 1	Score	Team 2
11 March 1989
Aarau	1–1 (a.e.t.) (4–3 p)	Grenchen
12 March 1989
Baden	1–3	Lugano
Bellinzona	2–0	Xamax
Delémont	0–3	FC Schaffhausen
Lausanne-Sport	3–0	ES Malley
Luzern	2–3 (a.e.t.)	Grasshopper Club
FC Olten	1–2	Basel
Sion	2–1	Winterthur

=== Matches ===
11 March 1989

Aarau	1–1 (a.e.t.)	Grenchen
Knup (1:1), 116'	FCA summary	107' (0:1) Du Buisson
Penalties
van der Gijp (penalty scored); Knup (penalty scored); Osterwalder (penalty scored); Lunde (penalty scored)	4–3	(penalty scored) Ciołek; (penalty scored) Jäggi; (penalty missed) Steiner; (penalty scored) Lanz; (penalty missed) Gunia

Stadion Brügglifeld, Aarau
Attendance: 3,700
Referee: (Switzerland) Peter Bochsler (Basel)

12 March 1989
14:30

Baden	1–3	Lugano
Born 68' (1:2)	RSSSF summary	27' (0:1) Elia; 35' (0:2) Sylvestre; 90+1' (1:3) Manfreda

Esp Stadium, Fislisbach

12 March 1989

Bellinzona	2–0	Xamax
Türkyilmaz 28' (pen.); Hannes 65' (pen.)	RSSSF summary

Stadio Comunale Bellinzona, Bellinzona

12 March 1989

Delémont	0–3	FC Schaffhausen
	RSSSF summary	23' (0:1) Thoma; 70' (0:2) Krebs; 81' (0:3) Thoma

La Blancherie, Delémont

12 March 1989

Lausanne-Sport	3–0	ES Malley
Schürmann 26' (1:0); Douglas 80' (2:0); Bregy 83' (3:0)	RSSSF summary

Olympique de la Pontaise, Lausanne

12 March 1989

Luzern	2–3 (a.e.t.)	Grasshopper Club
Bernaschina 55' (1:2)	RSSSF summary	34' (0:1) Wyss; 54' (0:2) Halter; 117' (2:3) Rufer

Stadion Allmend, Luzern

12 March 1989
14:30

FC Olten	1–2	Basel
Granata (yellow card) 10'; Dervishaj 45' (1:1)	FCB summary	18' (pen. 0:1) Dittus; 88' (1:2) Cueni

Sportanlagen Kleinholz, Olten
Attendance: 1,650
Referee: (Switzerland) Gottfried Friedrich (Seedorf, Uri)

12 March 1989

Sion	2–1	Winterthur
Cina 7' (1:0); Bajic 39' (2:0)	RSSSF summary	84' (2:1) Jakovliev

Stade Tourbillon, Sion

== Quarter-finals ==
=== Summary ===
Team 1	Score	Team 2
12 April 1989
FC Schaffhausen	0–1	Sion
Basel	0–2	Aarau
Lausanne-Sport	1–2 (a.e.t.)	Grasshopper Club
Lugano	2–0	Bellinzona

=== Matches ===
12 April 1989

FC Schaffhausen	0–1	Sion
	RSSSF summary	23' (0:1) Piffaretti

Stadion Breite, Schaffhausen
Attendance: 5,600
Referee: (Switzerland) Paul-Louis Christe

12 April 1989
20:00

Basel	0–2	Aarau
Dittus (yellow card) 40'; Moscatelli (yellow card) 67'; Thoma (yellow card) 68'	FCB summary FCA summary	(yellow card) 15' Knup; 39' (0:1) Knup; (yellow card) 67' Kilian; (yellow card) 80' Kühni; 90+1' (0:2) van der Gijp

St. Jakob Stadium, Basel
Attendance: 8,500
Referee: (Switzerland) Fredy Philippoz

12 April 1989

Lausanne-Sport	1–2 (a.e.t.)	Grasshopper Club
Schürmann 42' (1:1)	RSSSF summary	8' (1:0) Halter; 119' (1:2) Andermatt

Olympique de la Pontaise, Lausanne
Attendance: 6,000
Referee: (Switzerland) Arturo Martino (Neukirch an der Thur)

12 April 1989

Lugano	2–0	Bellinzona
Englund 7' (1:0); Pelosi 38' (2:0)	RSSSF summary

Cornaredo, Lugano
Attendance: 6,000
Referee: (Switzerland) Daniel Roduit (Fully)

== Semi-finals ==
=== Summary ===
Team 1	Score	Team 2
18 April 1989
Aarau	3–2	Lugano
FC Sion	0–0 (a.e.t.) (3–4 p)	Grasshopper Club

=== Matches ===
18 April 1989

Aarau	3–2	Lugano
Sforza 2' (1:0); Knup 64' (2:0); Knup 86' (3:2)	FCA summary	69' (og 2:1) (Böckli); 80' (pen 2:2) Gorter

Stadion Brügglifeld, Aarau
Attendance: 8,000
Referee: (Switzerland) Marcel Despland (Yverdon-les-Bains)

18 April 1989

FC Sion	0–0 (a.e.t.)	Grasshopper Club
	RSSSF summary
Penalties
Penalty scored Penalty missed	3–4	Penalty scored

Stade Tourbillon, Sion
Attendance: 14,120
Referee: (Switzerland) Marco Raveglia (San Vittore)

== Final ==
=== Summary ===
Team 1	Score	Team 2
15 May 1989
Grasshopper Club	2–1	Aarau

=== Telegram ===
15 May 1989
15:00

Grasshopper Club	2–1	Aarau
Halter 9' (1:0); Andermatt (yellow card) 13'; Halter 50' (2:0); Halter (yellow card) 75'	Fussball-Schweiz summary	59' (2:1) van der Gijp; (yellow card) 76' Kühni

Wankdorf, Bern
Attendance: 27,000
Referee: (Switzerland) Serge Muhmenthaler (Grenchen)

Grasshopper Club won the cup and this was the club's 16th cup title to this date and the second in a row.

== Sources and references ==
- RSSSF Page
