= 1988–89 FC Basel season =

FC Basel
1988–89 season
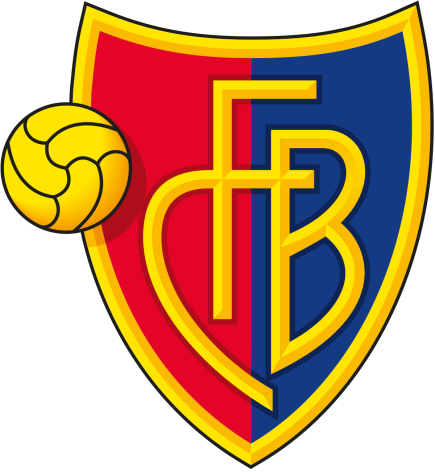
- Chairman: Charles Röthlisberger
- Manager: Urs Siegenthaler
- Ground: St. Jakob Stadium, Basel
- Nationalliga B: 1st of 12
- Promotion/relegation round: 4th of 8
- Swiss Cup: Quarterfinal
- Top goalscorer: League: Lucio Esposito; Ralph Thoma (13 each); All: Lucio Esposito (15)
- Highest home attendance: 12,000 on 27 March 1988 vs Zürich
- Lowest home attendance: 1,200 on 4 December 1988 vs Winterthur and on 14 June 1989 vs St. Gallen
- Average home league attendance: 3,765

The Fussball Club Basel 1893 1988–89 season was their 95th season since the club's foundation. Charles Röthlisberger was the club's chairman. He was their 31st chairman in the club's history and this was his second year in this position. FCB played their home games in the St. Jakob Stadium. Following their relegation after the previous season, this was their first season in the second-tier of Swiss football since their 1945–46 season as they achieved promotion to the top-tier.

== Overview ==
=== Pre-season ===
Following their relegation after the previous Nationalliga A season the club's priority aim was to return immediately to the top flight of Swiss football. Urs Siegenthaler was first-team coach for the second consecutive season. Due to the relegation there were many modifications in the squad. Ruedi Zahner retired from active football. Both goalkeepers moved on, Bernard Pulver to Young Boys and Urs Suter to Zürich. Stefan Bützer and Frank Eggeling both transferred to Emmenbrücke. Thomas Hauser and Varadaraju Sundramoorthy went to play for local rivals Old Boys. Dominique Herr moved on to Lausanne-Sport. The two forwards Adrian Knup transferred to Aarau and Peter Nadig to Luzern. Scottish ex-international Gordon Smith moved home to Scotland and joined Stirling Albion before ending his football career. Adrian Sedlo moved to Mulhouse and four other players left the club, because their contracts were not prolonged.

The club's financial problems had worsened during the previous season, this also due to the sinking number of spectators. But because an immediate return to the top flight was the priority, 12 new players were signed in, but for relatively small fees. Goalkeeper Remo Brügger was signed in from Luzern and his back up Roger Glanzmann from lower-tier FC Therwil. The experienced players Andre Rindlisbacher transferred in from Aarau, Rolf Baumann from VfB Stuttgart, Mario Moscatelli from St. Gallen and Lucio Esposito from Luzern. There were a number of new players who joined from lower division clubs. For example Michael Syfrig, who had played a big role in the promotion of FC Glarus the previous season, signed in on his first professional contract. Then local youngsters Germano Fanciulli joined from local rivals Old Boys and Andre Cueni from FC Laufen. Further Beat Aebi came from FC Volketswil, Kurt Spirig came from FC Diepoldsau and Patrick Liniger was brought up from the club's own the youth team.

=== Domestic league ===
The 24 teams in the Nationalliga B were divided into two groups, an east and a west group, to first play a qualification round. In the second stage the tops six teams in each group and the last four team of the Nationalliga A would play a promotion/relegation round, also divided into two groups. The top two teams in each group would next season play in the top flight. Basel were assigned to the East group. They ended their 22 matches in the Qualifying Phase with 14 victories, four draws and four defeats with 32 points and they became group winners. The team scored 48 goals and conceded just 23. In this first stage Lucio Esposito was the team's top goal scorer with 10 goals and Ralph Thoma second in the internal ranking with eight goals.

Thus Basel qualified themselves for a Promotion group. Basel were assigned to group A. Also qualified for this group from the Nationalliga B were Zürich, CS Chênois, Grenchen, ES Malley and the Old Boys. The team's goal scoring quality was missed during the Promotion stage. In the fifth, sixth and seventh round Basel lost the two away games against Lausanne-Sports 1–4 and St. Gallen 0–3, as well as the home match against local rivals Old Boys 0–1, therefore losing very valuable points. Basel ended the group with just 19 scored goals and just 14 obtained points in fourth position and thus they missed promotion. They were nine respectively eight points behind St. Gallen and Lausanne-Sports, both of whom were quite easily able to avoid relegation.

=== Swiss Cup ===
Basel entered into the Swiss Cup in the 2nd principal round. Here they were drawn away against local amateur team Oberwil. The game was won easily by 5–0. In the next round Basel were drawn against higher classed Young Boys. Basel mastered their opponents well, winning 4–1. In the round of 32 and round of 16 Basel had two ties against lower tier teams, FC Töss from the 2. Liga Inter and FC Olten from the 1. Liga, winning both to qualify for the quarterfinals. Here their cup season game to an end because they lost against top-tier team Aarau. Grasshopper Club won the cup for the second season in a row, beating Aarau 2–1 in the final.

== Players ==
Note: Flags indicate national team as defined under FIFA eligibility rules; some limited exceptions apply. Players may hold more than one non-FIFA nationality.

No.	Pos.	Nation	Player
1	GK	SUI	Remo Brügger (from Luzern)
1	GK	SUI	Thomas Grüter (from St. Gallen)
2	DF	SUI	Markus Hodel
3	MF	SUI	Andre Rindlisbacher (from Aarau)
4	DF	SUI	Massimo Ceccaroni
5	DF	SUI	Michael Syfrig (from FC Glarus)
6	MF	GER	Rolf Baumann (from VfB Stuttgart)
7	MF	SUI	Mario Moscatelli (from St. Gallen)
8	MF	ESP	Enrique Mata
9	FW	ITA	Germano Fanciulli (from Old Boys)
10	MF	GER	Uwe Dittus
11	FW	SUI	Ralph Thoma

No.	Pos.	Nation	Player
12	DF	GER	Peter Bernauer
13	DF	SUI	Bruno Hänni
14	FW	ITA	Lucio Esposito (from Luzern)
15	FW	SUI	Beat Aebi (FC Volketswil)
16	FW	SUI	Patrick Rahmen
17	DF	SUI	Markus Füri
18	DF	SUI	Kurt Spirig (from Diepoldsau)
19	MF	SUI	Andre Cueni (from FC Laufen)
20	GK	SUI	Roger Glanzmann (from FC Therwil)
—	DF	SUI	Patrick Liniger (from youth team)
—	FW	SUI	Markus Selg
—	MF	SUI	Stephan Schaub
—	FW	SUI	Remo Steiner

Players who left the squad

Note: Flags indicate national team as defined under FIFA eligibility rules; some limited exceptions apply. Players may hold more than one non-FIFA nationality.

No.	Pos.	Nation	Player
—	GK	SUI	Bernard Pulver (to Young Boys)
—	GK	SUI	Urs Suter (to Zürich)
—	DF	SUI	Philipp Baumberger
—	MF	SUI	Stefan Bützer (to Locarno)
—	FW	GER	Frank Eggeling (to Emmenbrücke)
—	DF	SUI	Fabio Ghisoni (to Emmenbrücke)
—	FW	GER	Thomas Hauser (to Old Boys)
—	DF	SUI	Dominique Herr (to Lausanne-Sport)

No.	Pos.	Nation	Player
—	FW	SUI	Adrian Knup (to Aarau)
—	MF	SUI	Peter Nadig (to Luzern)
—	MF	GER	Bernd Schramm (to reserves)
—	FW	SUI	Mathias Wehrli (returned to FC Laufen)
—	MF	SUI	Ruedi Zahner (retired)
—	MF	SCO	Gordon Smith (to Stirling Albion)
—	DF	GER	Adrian Sedlo (to Mulhouse)
—	MF	GRE	Fotios Karapetsas (to reserves)
—	FW	SGP	Varadaraju Sundramoorthy (to Old Boys)

== Results ==
Legend

Win Draw Loss Postponed

=== Friendly matches ===
==== Pre- and mid-season ====
29 June 1988 Pre-season	Basel (Switzerland)	2–3	(Switzerland) Bellinzona	St. Jakob Stadium, Basel
20:00	Dittus 25' (1:0); Dittus 74' (pen. 2:2)	FCB summary	29' (1:1) Jacobacci; 45' (1:2) Jacobacci; 85' (2:3) Jacobacci	Attendance: 300; Referee: (Switzerland) André Reck

3 July 1988 Pre-season	FC Mulhouse (France)	2–1	(Switzerland) Basel	Stade Municipal, Hirtzbach
17:00	Subiat 32' (1:0); Peuget 59' (2:1)	FCB summary	54' (1:1) Baumann	Attendance: 800; Referee: (France) Zumsteck
Note: Anniversary game, 60th year of the founding of FC Hirtzbach

6 July 1988 Pre-season	Basel (Switzerland)	5–0	(Austria) Dornbirn 1913	St. Jakob Stadium, Basel
20:00	Hänni 13' (1:0); Esposito 46' (2:0); Rindlisbacher 63' (3:0); Syfrig 73' (4:0); Hänni 88' (5:0)	FCB summary		Attendance: 300; Referee: (Switzerland) Willi Rudin (Liestal and Birsfelden)

9 July 1988 Pre-season	SC Freiburg (Germany)	1–1 (4–3 p)	(Switzerland) Basel	Elzstadion, Emmendingen
18:30	Higl 51' (1:1)	FCB summary	8' (0:1) Dittus	Referee: (Germany) Holger Dehmelt (Sabachwalden)
	Penalties
	Staib (penalty scored); Hermann (penalty missed); Majka (penalty scored); Weber (penalty scored); Fludec (penalty scored)		(penalty scored) Fanciulli; (penalty scored) Rindlisbacher; (penalty missed) Dittus; (penalty missed) Baumann; (penalty scored) Thoma

10 July 1988 Pre-season	FC Emmendingen (Germany)	1–0	(Switzerland) Basel	Elzstadion, Emmendingen
15:30	Hilbig 65' (1:0)	FCB summary		Attendance: 700; Referee: (Germany) Josef Hodapp

13 July 1988 Pre-season	Basel (Switzerland)	2–1	(Netherlands) Twente	St. Jakob Stadium, Basel
19:00	Moscatelli 11' (1:0); Thoma 51' (2:0)	FCB summary	76' (2:1) Koopman	Attendance: 700; Referee: (Switzerland) Francis Fischer (Arch)

16 July 1988 Pre-season	Grenchen (Switzerland)	0–3	(Switzerland) Basel	Stadion Brühl, Grenchen
19:00		FCB summary	40' (0:1) Thoma; 78' (0:2) Esposito; 83' (0:3) Esposito	Attendance: 2,000; Referee: (Switzerland) Kurt Röthlisberger (Suhr, Aargau)
Note: FCB with new shirt sponsorship for the first time (Basler Zeitung)

19 July 1988 Pre-season	Basel (Switzerland)	0–1	(Scotland) Celtic	St. Jakob Stadium, Basel
20:00		FCB summary	74' (0:1) Walker	Attendance: 2,700; Referee: (Switzerland) André Reck
Note: First game for Kurt Spirig who came from the 1. Liga club FC Altstätten (St. Gallen) on loan to FC Diepoldsau..

28 September 1988 Mid-season	Basel (Switzerland)	1–6	(Germany) VfB Stuttgart	St. Jakob Stadium, Basel
20:00	Esposito 16' (1:1)	FCB summary	11' (0:1) Buchwald; 29' (pen. 1:2) Schütterle; 43' (1:3) Schröder; 59' (1:4) Schütterle; 69' (1:5) Schmäler; 88' (1:6) Klinge	Attendance: 1,400; Referee: (Switzerland) Peter Bochsler (Basel)
Note: Corners: FCB 4, VfB 13.

8 November 1988 Mid-season	FC Sursee (Switzerland)	1–1	(Switzerland) Basel	Sursee
	Widmer 49' (1:1)	FCB summary	41' (0:1) Esposito

==== Winter break and mid-season ====
18 February 1989 Winter break	1. FC Pforzheim (Germany)	1–0	(Switzerland) Basel	Stadion im Brötzinger Tal, Pforzheim
14:30	Andreas Mähler 3' (1:0)	FCB summary		Attendance: 1,400

22 February 1989 Winter break	Lugano (Switzerland)	2–0	(Switzerland) Basel	Cornaredo, Lugano
20:00	Gorter 53' (pen. 1:0); Jensen 55' (2:0)	FCB summary		Attendance: 250; Referee: (Switzerland) Francesco Bianchi (Chiasso)

25 February 1989 Winter break	Basel (Switzerland)	1–1	(Switzerland) Grasshopper Club	St. Jakob Stadium, Basel
14:30	Mata 32' (1:0)	FCB summary	(yellow card) 16' Egli; (yellow card) 26' Halter; (yellow card) 33' Wyss; 83' (o.g. 1:1) Dittus	Attendance: 1,000; Referee: (Switzerland) Peter Bochsler (Basel)

2 March 1989 Winter break	Xamax (Switzerland)	5–0	(Switzerland) Basel	Les Fourches, Saint-Blaise
17:00	Hermann 2' (1:0); Sutter 3' (2:0); Lüthi 38' (3:0); Lüthi 40' (4:0); Lüthi 61' (5:0)	FCB summary		Attendance: 200; Referee: (Switzerland) Manfred Schlup, (Grenchen)

4 March 1989 Winter break	Basel (Switzerland)	3–2	(Switzerland) Aarau	St. Jakob Stadium, Basel
14:30	Moscatelli 42' (1:0); Thoma 79' (2:2); Cueni 85' (3:2)	FCB summary	56' (1:1) Sforza; 69' (1:2) van der Gijp	Attendance: 700; Referee: (Switzerland) Rolf Blattmann (Zeiningen)

8 March 1989 Winter break	Basel (Switzerland)	0–1	(Switzerland) FC Glarus	St. Jakob Stadium, Basel
20:00		FCB summary	43' (0:1) Paradiso	Attendance: 300; Referee: (Switzerland) Fabrice Kaltenrieder

25 April 1989 Mid-season	FC Châtel-Saint-Denis (Switzerland)	1–3	(Switzerland) Basel	Stade du Lussy, Châtel-Saint-Denis
	Goal	FCB summary	(1x) Cueni (1x) Moscatelli (1x) Esposito

=== Nationalliga B ===
==== Qualifying Phase East ====
23 July 1988 Round 1	Zürich	1–1	Basel	Letzigrund, Zürich
20:00	Landolt 6' (1:1); Landolt (yellow card) 27'	FCZ summary FCB summary	3' (0:1) Esposito; (yellow card) 24' Baumann; (yellow card) 63' Moscatelli	Attendance: 5,300; Referee: (Switzerland) Francesco Bianchi (Chiasso)
Note: FCB players Remo Brügger, Michael Syfrig, André Rindlisbacher, Mario Moscatelli, Rolf Baumann, Germano Fanciulli and Lucio Esposito with their team debuts. FCZ goalkeeper Urs Suter left the field in the 45th minute with a torn Achilles tendon and was taken to hospital. Corners: 5:2.

27 July 1988 Round 2	Basel	3–0	Locarno	Stadion Schützenmatte, Basel
20:30	Bernauer 57' (1:0); Esposito 58' (2:0); Aebi 77' (3:0)	FCB summary	(yellow card) Niedermayer	Attendance: 2,600; Referee: (Switzerland) Jean-Claude Tagliabue
Note: Home game played on the Schützenmatte, because the St. Jakob Stadium was not ready to play on following a Pink Floyd concert.

30 July 1988 Round 3	Schaffhausen	1–3	Basel	Stadion Breite, Schaffhausen
20:00	A. Thoma (yellow card) 23'; Krebs 26' (1:1)	FCB summary	22' (pen. 0:1) Dittus; (yellow card) 32' Rindlisbacher; (yellow card) 70' R. Thoma; 76' (1:2) Moscatelli; (yellow card) 86' Baumann; 90' (1:3) R. Thoma	Attendance: 2,300; Referee: (Switzerland) Erwin Fölmli
Note: Corner: 3:7 (1:2).

4 August 1988 Round 4	Basel	4–0	FC Chur	St. Jakob Stadium, Basel
20:00	Dittus 13' (pen. 1:0); Moscatelli 50' (2:0); Esposito 57' (3:0); Thoma 75' (4:0)	FCB summary	(yellow card) 34' Beeli; (yellow card) 54' Manetsch	Attendance: 4,200; Referee: (Switzerland) Karl Strässle (Steinach and Heiden)
Note: Note: NLA debut for Kurt Spirig. Corners: 16:3.

10 August 1988 Round 5	Old Boys	0–3	Basel	Stadion Schützenmatte, Basel
20:00	Hauser (yellow card) 8'; Maurer (yellow card) 11'; Kägi (yellow card) 76'	FCB summary	(yellow card) 27' Hänni; (yellow card) 29' Moscatelli; 43' (0:1) Esposito; 56' (o.g. 0:2) (Maurer); 63' (0:3) Esposito	Attendance: 9,200; Referee: (Switzerland) Arturo Martino (Neukirch an der Thur)

13 August 1988 Round 6	Basel	1–2	FC Glarus	St. Jakob Stadium, Basel
20:00	R. Thoma 37'; Baumann (yellow card) 81'	FCB summary	82' Lötscher; 88' Zug; (yellow card) 33' (yellow-red card) 86' Gabriel	Attendance: 4,300; Referee: (Switzerland) François Xavier Amherdt

16 August 1988 Round 7	Chiasso	0–1	Basel	Stadio Comunale, Chiasso
20:00	Malnati (yellow card) 54'; Neumann (yellow card) 64'; Sordelli (yellow card) 87'	FCB summary	55' (0:1) Dittus; (yellow card) 71' (yellow-red card) 74' Bernauer; (yellow card) 75' Hodel; (yellow card) 83' Mata; (yellow card) 90+2' Rahmen	Attendance: 1,400; Referee: (Switzerland) Michel Barbezat

27 August 1988 Round 8	Basel	3–0	Zug	St. Jakob Stadium, Basel
20:00	Brügger (yellow card) 11'; Baumann 23' (1:0); Moscatelli 33' (2:0); Mata 36' (3:0)	FCB summary	(yellow card) 37' Allegretti	Attendance: 3,000; Referee: (Switzerland) Rudolf Schödl

31 August 1988 Round 9	Baden	0–2	Basel	Esp Stadium, Fislisbach
20:00	Balzarini (yellow card) 60'	FCB summary	(yellow card) 29' Moscatelli; 53' (0:1) Esposito; (yellow card) 61' Hodel; 88' (0:2) Mata	Attendance: 1,900; Referee: (Switzerland) Bernard Neukom (Zürich)
Note: Corners: Baden 3, Basel 3.

10 September 1988 Round 10	Winterthur	2–1	Basel	Schützenwiese, Winterthur
20:00	Häfeli 56' (1:0); Hutka 63' (2:0)	FCB summary	(yellow card) 81' Moscatelli; 89' (2:1) R. Thoma	Attendance: 4,000; Referee: (Switzerland) Mario Marbet
Note: First National league game for referee Mario Marbet

17 September 1988 Round 11	Basel	3–1	Emmenbrücke	St. Jakob Stadium, Basel
20:00	Syfrig 88' (1:1); Aebi 90' (2:1); Moscatelli 90+6' (3:1)	FCB summary	(yellow card) 16' (yellow-red card) 24' Büeler; 23' (0:1) Zemp; (yellow card) 26' Zemp; (yellow card) 34' Ghisoni; (yellow card) 46' Studer; (yellow card) 77' Gasser; (yellow card) 81' Berger; (yellow card) 84' (yellow-red card) 87' Roth; (yellow card) 90' Schupp	Attendance: 2,800; Referee: (Switzerland) Bernard Neukom (Zürich)
Note: Corners: 13:1.

24 September 1988 Round 12	Basel	2–2	Zürich	St. Jakob Stadium, Basel
20:00	Esposito 18' (1:1); Mata 58' (2:1); Dittus (yellow card) 62'	FCZ summary FCB summary	4' (0:1) Şahin; (yellow card) 8' Şahin; (yellow card) 59' B. Studer; 63' (2:2) J. Studer; (yellow card) 85' Gilli	Attendance: 8,500; Referee: (Switzerland) Ludwig Zurkirchen (Zell, Lucerne)
Note: Corner: 4-3. Mediocre refereeing. Even before the match, there was a confrontation between the 70 police officers deployed and rioting hooligans. The police observed 60 hooligans, of whom around 30 had traveled from Dortmund. Tages-Anzeiger, September 26, 1988: "Basel police arrested 72 hooligans on the sidelines of the FCB–FCZ match and confiscated an arsenal of projectiles and blunt instruments. This reportedly prevented serious riots. [...] According to the police, those temporarily detained include 51 people from the Zurich area and 21 Germans from Ahlen, Dortmund, and Duisburg."

1 October 1988 Round 13	Locarno	2–2	Basel	Stadio del Lido, Locarno
20:00	Siwek 7' (1:0); Bützer (yellow card) 33'; Forestier (yellow card) 72'; Schönwetter 88' (1:2)	FCB summary	(yellow card) 15' Rindlisbacher; 54' (1:1) Thoma; 62' (1:2) Hänni	Attendance: 1,700; Referee: (Switzerland) François Xavier Amherdt
Note: Honoured Enrico Giani for his 250th game for Locarno in the 1. Liga, the NLB and the NLA. Corners: 6:6. Excellent refereeing.

8 October 1988 Round 14	Basel	1–0	Schaffhausen	St. Jakob Stadium, Basel
20:00	Hodel (yellow card) 33'; Aebi (yellow card) 76'; Hänni 83' (1:0); Syfrig (yellow card) 87'	FCB summary		Attendance: 3,000; Referee: (Switzerland) Hans Weber
Note: Corners: 5:6.

16 October 1988 Round 15	FC Chur	0–3	Basel	Ringstrasse, Chur
14:30		FCB summary	62' (0:1) Moscatelli; 74' (0:2) Baumann; (yellow card) 76' Moscatelli; (yellow card) 84' Hänni; 85' (0:3) Mata	Attendance: 1,350; Referee: (Switzerland) Marcel Despland (Yverdon-les-Bains)

22 October 1988 Round 16	Basel	1–2	Old Boys	St. Jakob Stadium, Basel
20:00	Dittus (yellow card) 57'; Brügger (yellow card) 72'; Dittus 74' (pen. 1:1); Baumann (yellow card) 85'	FCB summary	(yellow card) 18' Spicher; (penalty missed) 26′ Hauck; 26' (0:1) Hauck; 80' (1:2) Kägi	Attendance: 7,800; Referee: (Switzerland) Francis Fischer (Arch)
Note: 26th minute, FCB goalkeeper Remo Brügger saved Maximilian Hauck's penalty-kick, but had no chance against Hauck's follow-up shot.

30 October 1988 Round 17	FC Glarus	0–3	Basel	Sportplatz Buchholz, Glarus
14:30	Ramensperger (yellow card); Gabriel (yellow card)	FCB summary	2' (0:1) Thoma; 22' (0:2) Thoma; 90' (0:3) Esposito; (yellow card) Hänni; (yellow card) Dittus	Attendance: 2,500; Referee: (Switzerland) Aldo Palama

6 November 1988 Round 18	Basel	2–1	Chiasso	St. Jakob Stadium, Basel
14:30	Esposito 80' (1:0); Mata (yellow card) 82'; Thoma 89' (2:1)	FCB summary	82' (1:1) Romagnoli; (yellow card) 83' (yellow-red card) 87' Malnati; (yellow card) 90+1' Fontana; (yellow card) 90+3' Romagnoli	Attendance: 2,900; Referee: (Switzerland) Willy Hänni, (Cugy)

20 November 1988 Round 19	Zug	2–2	Basel	Herti Allmend Stadion, Zug
14:30	Zwahlen 32' (1:1); Huber 44' (2:1); Stierli (yellow card) 59'; Zwahlen (yellow card) 71'	FCB summary	19' (0:1) Baumann; (penalty missed) 40′ Dittus; (yellow card) 70' Rindlisbacher; 90' (2:2) Moscatelli; (yellow card) 90+1' Moscatelli	Attendance: 400; Referee: (Switzerland) Erwin Schuler

27 November 1988 Round 20	Basel	1–4	Baden	St. Jakob Stadium, Basel
14:30	Mata (yellow card) 25'; Bernauer 59' (1:2); Baumann (yellow card) 83'	FCB summary	4' (0:1) Brazil; (yellow card) 19' Ponte; (yellow card) 28' Lerchmüller; 35' (0:2) Brazil; 71' (1:3) Zaugg; 77' (1:4) Wiesner	Attendance: 2,800; Referee: (Switzerland) O. Grütsch

4 December 1988 Round 21	Basel	3–1	Winterthur	St. Jakob Stadium, Basel
14_30	Dittus 15' (1:1); Esposito 28' (2:1); Moscatelli 70' (3:1)	FCB summary	7' (pen. 0:1) Graf	Attendance: 1,200; Referee: (Switzerland) Erwin Fölmli

11 December 1988 Round 22	Emmenbrücke	2–3	Basel	Stadion Gersag, Emmenbrücke
19:00	Eggeling 37' (1:2); Hözgen (yellow card) 71'; Greber 81' (2:3)	FCB summary	1' (0:1) Esposito; 31' (0:2) Mata; 69' (1:3) Hänni	Attendance: 130; Referee: (Switzerland) Bernard Neukom (Zürich)

==== League table ====
Pos	Team	Pld	W	D	L	GF	GA	GD	Pts	Qualification
1	Basel	22	14	4	4	48	23	+25	32	Advance to promotion round
2	Locarno	22	12	6	4	58	28	+30	30	Advance to promotion round
3	Zürich	22	11	8	3	62	32	+30	30	Advance to promotion round
4	Baden	22	10	4	8	44	29	+15	24	Advance to promotion round
5	Old Boys	22	10	4	8	37	29	+8	24	Advance to promotion round
6	Chiasso	22	8	8	6	35	33	+2	24	Advance to promotion round
7	FC Schaffhausen	22	9	6	7	32	36	−4	24	Continue in relegation round
8	Winterthur	22	8	6	8	39	36	+3	22	Continue in relegation round
9	Emmenbrücke	22	7	5	10	31	41	−10	19	Continue in relegation round
10	Chur	22	4	8	10	27	54	−27	16	Continue in relegation round
11	SC Zug	22	3	5	14	14	47	−33	11	Continue in relegation round
12	FC Glarus	22	2	4	16	19	58	−39	8	Continue in relegation round

Source: rsssf.com
Rules for classification: 1) Points; 2) Goal difference; 3) Goals scored; 4) Head-to-head points; 5) Away goals scored; 6) Draw.

==== Promotion/relegation phase ====
19 March 1989 Round 1	Chênois	2–2	Basel	Stade des Trois-Chêne, Thônex
14:30	Curtet 5' (1:0); Alberton (yellow card) 45'; Navarro 58' (2:1)	FCB summary	20' (1:1) Dittus; (yellow card) 57' Hänni; 79' (2:2) Aebi	Attendance: 1,400; Referee: (Switzerland) Ludwig Zurkirchen
Note: Corners: 6:7.

27 March 1989 Round 2	Basel	1–1	Zürich	St. Jakob Stadium, Basel
14:30	Moscatelli 68' (1:0); Hodel (yellow card) 83'	FCZ summary FCB summary	71' (1:1) Maiano	Attendance: 12,000; Referee: (Switzerland) Bruno Galler (Kirchdorf, Bern)
Note: Corners: 8:5

1 April 1989 Round 3	ES Malley	1–2	Basel	Stade du Bois Gentil, Malley
17:30	Knigge (yellow card) 23'; Gavillet (yellow card) 37' (Ceccaroni) 72' (o.g. 1:2)	FCB summary	40' (0:1) Esposito; 51' (0:2) Esposito; (yellow card) 57' Ceccaroni; (yellow card) 77' Rindlisbacher; (yellow card) 81' Grüter	Attendance: 2,120; Referee: (Switzerland) Gottfried Friedrich (Seedorf, Uri)
Note: Corners: 0:6 (0:1).

8 April 1989 Round 4	Basel	2–1	Grenchen	St. Jakob Stadium, Basel
20:00	Dittus 39' (1:0); Thoma 59' (2:0)	FCB summary	61' (2:1) Ciołek	Attendance: 3,100; Referee: (Switzerland) Paul-Louis Christe (Lausanne)
Note: Corners: 5:2.

15 April 1989 Round 5	Lausanne-Sport	4–1	Basel	Olympique de la Pontaise, Lausanne
20:00	Schürmann 9' (1:0); Chapuisat 39' (2:1); Hartmann 44' (3:1); Thychosen 60' (4:1)	FCB summary	14' (1:1) Thoma	Attendance: 4,000; Referee: (Switzerland) Georges Sandoz (Corcelles-Cormondrèche, Neuchâtel)
Note: NLA debut Stephan Schaub. A minute of silence for the victims of the Sheffield football disaster.

29 April 1989 Round 6	Basel	0–1	Old Boys	St. Jakob Stadium, Basel
20:00	Syfrig (yellow card) 30'	FCB summary	70' (0:1) Bachofner	Attendance: 3,800; Referee: (Switzerland) Francesco Bianchi (Chiasso)
Note: Corners: 11:2 (4:2).

6 May 1989 Round 7	St. Gallen	3–0	Basel	Espenmoos, St. Gallen
17:30	Hegi 19' (1:0); Fischer 45' (1:0); Gämperle (yellow card) 51'; Fischer 77' (3:0)	FCB summary	(yellow card) 5' Hänni; (yellow card) 60' Syfrig	Attendance: 9,000; Referee: (Switzerland) Daniel Roduit (Sion)
Note: Corners: 4:3 (1:3).

13 May 1989 Round 8	Basel	1–1	Chênois	St. Jakob Stadium, Basel
20:00	Rindlisbacher 11' (1:0); Rindlisbacher (yellow card) 44'; Moscatelli (yellow card) 45'	FCB summary	(yellow card) 11' Michel; 19' (1:1) Navarro	Attendance: 1,600; Referee: (Switzerland) Erwin Fölmli
Note: Corners: 7:3 (6:0).

20 May 1989 Round 9	Zürich	0–2	Basel	Letzigrund, Zürich
20:00	Şahin (yellow card) 21'	FCZ summary FCB summary	(yellow card) 6' Ceccaroni; 18' (0:1) Syfrig; (yellow card) 52' Mata; (yellow card) 78' Moscatelli; (yellow card) 80' Bernauer; 89' (0:2) Moscatelli	Attendance: 6,000; Referee: (Switzerland) Freddy Philippoz (Sion)
Note: Corners: 16:2 (5:2). Completely unsatisfactory refereeing performance (hectic, inconsistent, only adequate in terms of running).

23 May 1989 Round 10	Basel	1–1	ES Malley	St. Jakob Stadium, Basel
20:00	Bernauer 90' (1:1)	FCB summary	48' (0:1) Martelli; (yellow card) 73' Martelli	Attendance: 1,500; Referee: (Switzerland) Francis Fischer (Arch)
Note: Corners: 6:5 (1:2)

27 May 1989 Round 11	Grenchen	2–2	Basel	Stadion Brühl, Grenchen
17:30	Du Buisson 24' (1:0); Gunia 54' (2:0)	FCB summary	(yellow card) 26' Moscatelli; 61' (2:1) Thoma; (yellow card) 70' Rindlisbacher; 90' (2:2) Syfrig	Attendance: 1,200; Referee: (Switzerland) Erwin Fölmli

3 June 1989 Round 12	Basel	1–1	Lausanne-Sport	St. Jakob Stadium, Basel
20:00	Dittus 22' (1:0)	FCB summary	(yellow card) 68' Hottiger; 74' (1:1) Hartmann	Attendance: 1,500; Referee: (Switzerland) Daniel Roduit (Sion)

10 June 1989 Round 13	Old Boys	0–2	Basel	Stadion Schützenmatte, Basel
20:00	Hauck (penalty missed) 79′	FCB summary	55' (0:1) Thoma; 61' (0:2) Thoma; (yellow card) 76' Dittus	Attendance: 1,200; Referee: (Switzerland) Marcel Despland Yverdon
Note: 79th minute, Maximilian Hauck kicked the ball from the penalty wide of the goal.

14 June 1989 Round 14	Basel	2–3	St. Gallen	St. Jakob Stadium, Basel
20:00	Dittus 42' (1:2); Moscatelli 65' (2:2)	FCB summary	21' (0:1) Metzler; 25' (0:2) Gambino; 90' (2:3) Lehnherr	Attendance: 1,200; Referee: (Switzerland) Bruno Galler (Kirchdorf, Bern)

==== Table group A ====
Pos	Team	Pld	W	D	L	GF	GA	GD	Pts	Qualification
1	St. Gallen	14	10	3	1	30	13	+17	23	Remain in Nationalliga A 1989–90
2	Lausanne-Sport	14	9	4	1	42	8	+34	22	Remain in Nationalliga A 1989–90
3	Zürich	14	6	2	6	29	23	+6	14	Remain in 1989–90 Nationalliga B
4	Basel	14	4	6	4	19	21	−2	14	Remain in 1989–90 Nationalliga B
5	Chênois	14	4	4	6	22	29	−7	12	Remain in 1989–90 Nationalliga B
6	Grenchen	14	3	4	7	17	26	−9	10	Remain in 1989–90 Nationalliga B
7	ES Malley	14	2	6	6	15	29	−14	10	Remain in 1989–90 Nationalliga B
8	Old Boys	14	3	1	10	13	38	−25	7	Remain in 1989–90 Nationalliga B

Source: rsssf.com
Rules for classification: 1) Points; 2) Goal difference; 3) Goals scored; 4) Head-to-head points; 5) Away goals scored; 6) Draw.

=== Swiss Cup ===
20 August 1988 2nd round	FC Oberwil	0–5	Basel	Sportanlage Eisweiher, Oberwil
19:30	Eichenberger (yellow card) 1'	FCB summary	22' (0:1) Esposito; 32' (0:2) Rahmen; 76' (0:3) Baumann; 79' (pen. 0:4) Dittus; 83' (0:5) Aebi	Attendance: 1,800; Referee: (Switzerland) Peter Bochsler (Basel)
Note: Oberwil played the 1988–89 season in the 2. Liga (fifth-tier). Corners: 5:11

3 September 1988 3rd round	Basel	4–1	Young Boys	St. Jakob Stadium, Basel
20:00	Esposito 8' (1:0); Baumann (yellow card) 29'; Brügger (yellow card) 45'; Hodel 53' (2:1); Thoma 55' (3:2); Hodel (yellow card) 57'; Dittus 81' (4:1)	FCB summary	(yellow card) 31' Limpar; 48' (1:1) Zuffi; (yellow card) 63' Rapolder	Attendance: 6,000; Referee: (Switzerland) Arturo Martino (Neukirch an der Thur)

13 November 1988 Round of 32	FC Töss (Winterthur)	0–1 (a.e.t.)	Basel	Reitplatz, Winterthur
10:00	Moor (yellow card) 28'; Hofmann (yellow card) 44'	FCB summary	107' (0:1) Bernauer; (yellow card) 112' Fanciulli	Attendance: 1,200; Referee: (Switzerland) Kurt Röthlisberger (Suhr)
Note: Töss played the 1988–89 season in the 2. Liga Inter (fourth-tier). Torrential rain throughout the entire game, waterlogged pitch. Corners: 3–23

12 March 1989 Round of 16	FC Olten	1–2	Basel	Sportanlagen Kleinholz, Olten
14:30	Granata (yellow card) 10'; Dervishaj 45' (1:1)	FCB summary	18' (pen. 0:1) Dittus; 88' (1:2) Cueni	Attendance: 1,650; Referee: (Switzerland) Gottfried Friedrich (Seedorf, Uri)
Note: Olten played the 1988–89 season in the 1. Liga (third-tier).

12 April 1989 Quarterfinal	Basel	0–2	Aarau	St. Jakob Stadium, Basel
20:00	Dittus (yellow card) 40'; Moscatelli (yellow card) 67'; Thoma (yellow card) 68'	FCB summary FCA summary	(yellow card) 15' Knup; 39' (0:1) Knup; (yellow card) 67' Kilian; (yellow card) 80' Kühni; 90+1' (0:2) van der Gijp	Attendance: 8,500; Referee: (Switzerland) Freddy Philippoz (Sion)

== See also ==
- History of FC Basel
- List of FC Basel players
- List of FC Basel seasons

== Sources ==
- Rotblau: Jahrbuch Saison 2015/2016. Publisher: FC Basel Marketing AG. ISBN 978-3-7245-2050-4
- Die ersten 125 Jahre. Publisher: Josef Zindel im Friedrich Reinhardt Verlag, Basel. ISBN 978-3-7245-2305-5
- The FCB squad 1988–89 at fcb-archiv.ch
- 1988–89 at RSSSF
