= Michael Syfrig =

Swiss footballer (born 1965)

Personal information
- Full name: Michael Syfrig
- Date of birth: 5 August 1965 (age 61)
- Position: Defender

Senior career*
Years	Team	Apps	(Gls)
1987–1988	FC Glarus		
1988–1989	FC Basel	31	(3)
1989–1991	FC Aarau	18	(3)
- * Club domestic league appearances and goals

Michael Syfrig (born 4 August 1965) is a Swiss former footballer who played in the late 1980s and early 1990s as defender.

Syfrig first played for FC Glarus in the 1st League, the third highest tier of Swiss football. At the end of the 1987–88 season Glarus were group 4 winners and advanced to the promotion play-offs. With two victories in the first round over FC Châtel-St-Denis, they advanced to the semi-finals. Here they were defeated by Urania Genève Sport but with two victories over FC Rorschach in the play-offs for third position they achieved promotion.

Syfrig then joined FC Basel's first team for their 1988–89 season under head coach Urs Siegenthaler. After playing in six test games Syfrig played his domestic league debut for his new club in the away game on 23 July 1988 as Basel played a 1–1 draw against Zürich. Basel and Glarus had been drawn into the same group. Although he missed the first game, played in Basel and won by his former team, he played in the return, away game which was won by his new team.

Syfrig scored his first goal for his club on 17 September in the home game in the St. Jakob Stadium as Basel won 3–1 against Emmenbrücke. It was a very important goal, because the home team were a goal down as of the 23rd minute. The guests had received two red cards, but were still leading as Syfrig equalised in the 88 minute. Two more goals from Beat Aebi (90) and Mario Moscatelli (90+6) then decided the match for Basel.

Basel won the division in the first qualifying phase. But in the promotion/relegation phase they lost too many points against Lausanne-Sport and St. Gallen, both of whom could then avoid relegation. Syfrig's contract with Basel was only for one year and he left the club after this one season. During this time Syfrig played a total of 47 games for Basel scoring a total of four goals. 31 of these games were in the Nationalliga A, five in the Swiss Cup and 11 were friendly games. He scored three goals in the domestic league and the other one was scored during the test games.

Following his time with Basel, Syfrig signed for two years with FC Aarau, one league higher, but he never became a regular player.

== Sources ==
- Die ersten 125 Jahre. Publisher: Josef Zindel im Friedrich Reinhardt Verlag, Basel. ISBN 978-3-7245-2305-5
- Verein "Basler Fussballarchiv" Homepage
