= Roger Glanzmann =

Swiss footballer (born 1968)

Personal information
- Full name: Roger Glanzmann
- Date of birth: 15 April 1968 (age 58)
- Place of birth: Switzerland
- Position: Goalkeeper

Youth career
- until 1987: FC Therwil

Senior career*
Years	Team	Apps	(Gls)
1987–1988	FC Therwil		
1988–1992	FC Basel	1	(0)
1992–1994	FC Ettingen		
- * Club domestic league appearances and goals

Roger Glanzmann (born 15 April 1968) is a Swiss former footballer who played in zhe 1980s and 1990s as goalkeeper.

== Football career ==
Glanzmann played his youth football with FC Therwil and advanced to their first team in the 1987–88 season as they played in the fourth tier of Swiss football. FC Basel had been relegated after the 1987–88 Nationalliga A season and because both goalkeepers and many other players left their squad, they were hiring new players. Goalkeeper Remo Brügger was signed in as a replacement from Luzern and Glanzmann also joined Basel from FC Therwil as his back up for their 1988–89 season under head coach Urs Siegenthaler.

After playing in three test games, Glanzmann played his domestic league debut for his new club in the away game on 30 October 1988 against FC Glarus. Glanzmann kept a clean sheet as Basel won 3–0. Glanzmann suffered an injury in the early part of 1990 and this kept him out for over a year. After his recovery Glanzmann played only one more Swiss Cup match against FC Willisau on 29 September 1991. Glanzmann kept a clean sheet here as well as Basel won 2–0.

Between the years 1988 and 1992 Glanzmann played a total of 22 games for Basel. One of these games were in the Nationalliga B, one in the Swiss Cup and 20 were friendly games.

== Curiosity ==
In 1994 there was a small scandal in Ettingen, near Basel. In the 59th minute of the 3rd division game between Ettingen and Binningen the referee awarded a penalty and showed the host team goalie the red card due to his foul. Because the Ettingen goalie would not leave the field, the referee Oliver Blattmann eventually threw away his whistle and marched into the cloakroom for good. The story also has a little celebrity factor. Referee Oliver Blattmann is the son of Rolf Blattmann, the former FIFA referee. Roger Glanzmann was the goalie. The author of the story in "Blick" was Marcel Rohr who later became sports director of the "Basler Zeitung".

== Sources ==
- Die ersten 125 Jahre. Publisher: Josef Zindel im Friedrich Reinhardt Verlag, Basel. ISBN 978-3-7245-2305-5
- Verein "Basler Fussballarchiv" Homepage
