= Jovellanos =

- Municipality
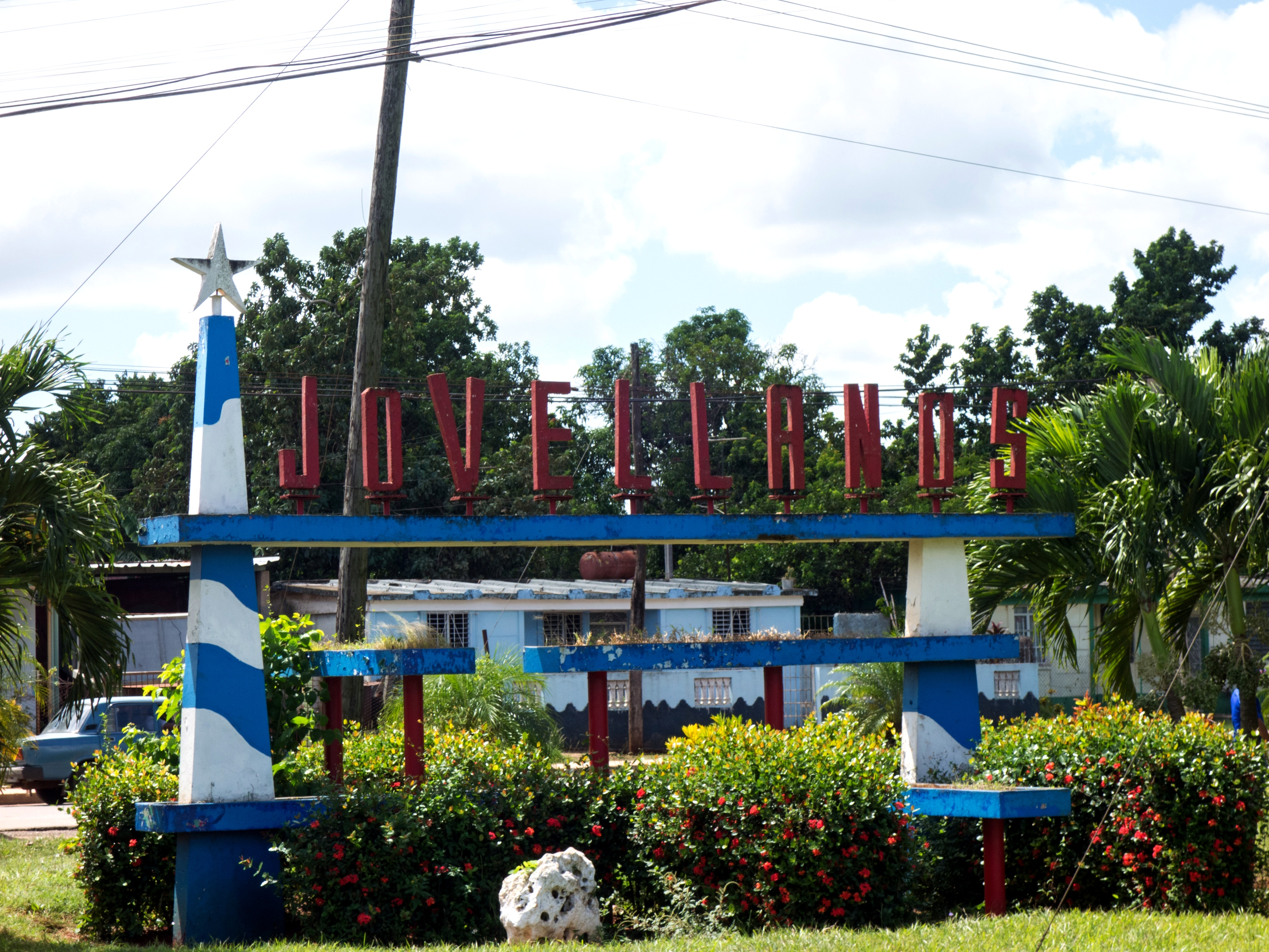

- Seal

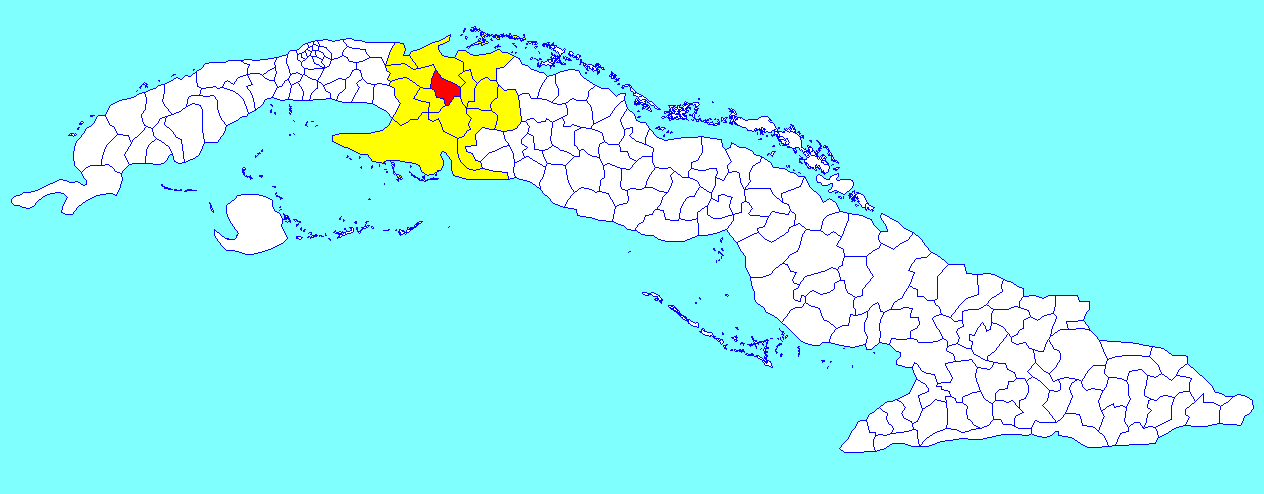
- Jovellanos municipality (red) within Matanzas Province (yellow) and Cuba
- Coordinates: 22°48′38″N 81°11′53″W
- Country: Cuba
- Province: Matanzas
- Founded: 1842 (Corral de la Bemba)
- Established: February 26, 1866

Area
  - Total: 505 km^{2} (195 sq mi)
- Elevation: 45 m (148 ft)

Population (2022)
  - Total: 57,216
  - Density: 113/km^{2} (293/sq mi)
- Time zone: UTC-5 (EST)
- Area code: +53-45

Jovellanos is a municipality and town in the Matanzas Province of Cuba.

== Overview ==
The municipality is divided into the barrios of Asunción, Isabel, Realengo and San José.

It was founded in 1842 as Corral de la Bemba on the location of an old ranch called Bemba. It took its current name in 1870, in honor of the Spanish writer Gaspar Melchor de Jovellanos. The same year it achieved the status of villa (town).

Jovellanos is also called "Bemba" by its inhabitants and locals. "Bemba" means "big lip" in Cuban Spanish; this term refers to the black population of the city. To outsiders, it may have negative racial overtones, but in the city this is not the case. Inside Jovellanos, the black and white population for the most part live harmoniously, side by side. Therefore, "Bemba" is an affectionate name for the town used by locals.

Jovellanos is an industrial town, with large and small factories, while sugar cane is cultivated in the surrounding areas.

== Demographics ==
In 2022, the municipality of Jovellanos had a population of 57,216. With a total area of 505 km^{2} (195 sq mi), it has a population density of 110/km^{2} (280/sq mi).

== Notable people ==
- Esteban Lazo Hernández (born 1944), Cuban politician and current president of the National Assembly
- Manuel Navarro Luna (1894–1966), Cuban poet and journalist

== See also ==
- Municipalities of Cuba
- List of cities in Cuba
