= Mirza Bzhalava =

Georgian professional football player

Personal information
- Date of birth: 5 February 1988 (age 38)
- Place of birth: Tbilisi, Soviet Union
- Height: 1.75 m (5 ft 9 in)
- Position: Midfielder

Senior career*
Years	Team	Apps	(Gls)
2005–2006	Ameri Tbilisi	5	(0)
2006–2007	Zestaponi	6	(0)
2007–2010	Austria Lustenau	25	(0)
2009	→ SC Bregenz (loan)	11	(2)
2010–2014	Diepoldsau-Schmitter	35	(13)
2014	Höchst	14	(1)
2014–2015	SC Bregenz		
2015	Lauterach		
2015–2016	Lustenau 07		
2016–2018	SC Tisis		
2018–2019	Lustenau 07		
2019	Schwarzach		

International career
2005–2008	Georgia U21	12	(0)
2006	Georgia	1	(0)
- * Club domestic league appearances and goals

Mirza Bzhalava (Georgian: მირზა ბჟალავა; born 5 February 1988) is a Georgian former professional footballer.

== Club career ==
On 31 January 2016, Bzhalava signed with SC Tisis, moving from Lustenau 07 where he had played for a year. He returned to Lustenau 07 two years later, before ending his football career with FC Schwarzach in 2019.

== International career ==
Bzhalava gained one cap for the Georgia national football team.
