= Manuel Navarro =

Manuel Navarro may refer to:

- Manuel Navarro Luna (1894–1966), Cuban poet
- Manuel Aparici Navarro (1902–1964), Spanish priest
- Manuel Navarro Nogueroles, Spanish sports manager
- Manu Navarro (born 2000), Spanish footballer

== See also ==
- Manel Navarro (born 1996), Spanish singer
