= Andre Cueni =

Swiss footballer (born 1960)

Personal information
- Full name: Andre Cueni
- Date of birth: 2 May 1960 (age 66)
- Place of birth: Switzerland
- Positions: Midfielder; forward

Senior career*
Years	Team	Apps	(Gls)
1979–1988	FC Laufen		
1988–1989	FC Basel	11	(0)
- * Club domestic league appearances and goals

Andre Cueni (born 2 May 1960) is a Swiss former footballer who played in the 1980s. He played mainly as a forward, but also as a midfielder.

Cueni first played for local club FC Laufen in the 1. Liga, the third tier of Swiss football. At the end of the 1981–82 season Laufen won group two of that division and qualified for the promotion play-offs. In the first round they beat SC Zug on the away goals rule and in the second round they beat SR Delémont 3–1 on aggregate to qualify for the final. In the final on 24 June 1982 they won 3–1 against Baden to secure promotion to the Nationalliga B as 1. Liga champions.

However, four seasons later Cueni and his team suffered relegation. He had played 101 Nationalliga B games and scored 26 goals for his club during this time. Cueni stayed with the team for another two seasons following their relegation.

FC Basel were relegated after the 1988–89 Nationalliga A season and because many players left their squad, they were hiring new players. Cueni thus joined Basel during the winter break of their 1988–89 season and signed his first professional football contract under head coach Urs Siegenthaler. After playing in five test games, Cueni made his debut for his new club in the Swiss Cup away game on 12 March 1989. He scored his first goal for his club in the same game as Basel won 2–1 against FC Olten. It was the winning goal of the match in the 88th minute.

Cueni made his domestic league debut for the club on 19 March in a 2–2 draw away to CS Chênois. During the six months he was with the club, Cueni played 19 games and scored three goals; 11 games were in the Nationalliga B, 2 in the Cup, and six were friendly games. He scored once in the cup and twice during the test games.

== Sources ==
- Die ersten 125 Jahre. Publisher: Josef Zindel im Friedrich Reinhardt Verlag, Basel. ISBN 978-3-7245-2305-5
- Verein "Basler Fussballarchiv" Homepage
