= Lucio Esposito =

Swiss-Italian football striker (born 1967)

Personal information
- Date of birth: 16 May 1967 (age 59)
- Place of birth: Italy
- Height: 1.75 m (5 ft 9 in)
- Position: Striker

Senior career*
Years	Team	Apps	(Gls)
1985–1988	FC Luzern	24	(2)
1988–1989	FC Basel	35	(13)
1989–1994	AC Bellinzona	100	(52)
1994–1998	SC Kriens	117	(33)
1998–2000	FC Aarau	33	(5)
2000–2002	Zug 94		
2004–2007	FC Kickers Luzern		
- * Club domestic league appearances and goals

Lucio Esposito (born 16 May 1967) is a Swiss-Italian former football striker who played throughout the 1980s, 1990s and 2000s.

== Career ==
Esposito started playing professional football in 1985 with FC Luzern in the Nationalliga A.

Esposito joined FC Basel's first team for their 1988–89 season under head-coach Urs Siegenthaler. Basel had been relegated the previous season and were looking for a goal scoring forward. After playing in seven test games in which he scored three goals, Esposito played his domestic league debut for his new club in the away game on 23 July 1988. He scored his first goal for his new team in the third minute of that game as Basel drew 1–1 with Zürich.

Staying just the one season with the club, Esposito played a total of 53 games for Basel scoring a total of 21 goals. 35 of these games were in the Nationalliga A, three in the Swiss Cup and 15 were friendly games. He scored 13 goals in the domestic league, two in the cup and the other six were scored during the test games.

In August 1989, Esposito signed for AC Bellinzona, who at that time played one division higher. Esposito did not play regularly and the team suffered relegation at the end of the season. But Esposito stayed with the club and in the lower division he played regularly. He played for Bellinzona for five years. He then signed for SC Kriens in 1994, who at this time also played in the second tier of Swiss football. In the 1996–97 season the team qualified for the promotion/relegation round, this they finished in fourth position and achieved promotion to the top level. Esposito stayed one more season with Kriens. Despite scoring 16 goals, he could not save the team from immediate relegation.

The following season Esposito joined FC Aarau for two years. Zug 94 acquired his services in 2000 and he retired from active football in 2002. He came out of retirement in 2004 and played for the amateur club FC Kickers Luzern, in the fifth tier of Swiss football for two years.

== Sources ==
- Die ersten 125 Jahre. Publisher: Josef Zindel im Friedrich Reinhardt Verlag, Basel. ISBN 978-3-7245-2305-5
- Verein "Basler Fussballarchiv" Homepage
