= Roger Tschudin =

Swiss footballer (born 1966)

Personal information
- Date of birth: 21 July 1966 (age 60)
- Height: 1.90 m (6 ft 3 in)
- Position: Goalkeeper

Senior career*
| Years | Team | Apps | (Gls) |
| 1984–1990 | FC Luzern | | |
| 1991–1993 | SC Kriens | | |

International career
- Switzerland U21
- * Club domestic league appearances and goals

Roger Tschudin (born 21 July 1966) is a retired Swiss football goalkeeper.
