= Daniel Häfeli =

Swiss footballer (born 1960)

Personal information
- Date of birth: 1 August 1960 (age 66)
- Height: 1.83 m (6 ft 0 in)
- Position: Defender

Senior career*
Years	Team	Apps	(Gls)
1978–1986	FC Winterthur		
1986–1988	FC Lugano		
1988–1989	FC Winterthur		
- * Club domestic league appearances and goals

Daniel Häfeli (born 1 August 1960) is a retired Swiss football defender.
