= Rolf Baumann =

German association football player, association football manager and physiotherapist

Personal information
- Full name: Rolf Baumann
- Date of birth: 14 June 1963 (age 63)
- Place of birth: Blaustein, Germany
- Positions: Midfielder; forward

Senior career*
Years	Team	Apps	(Gls)
–1987	SC Geislingen		
1987–1988	VfB Stuttgart	3	(0)
1988–1991	FC Basel	34	(4)

Managerial career
- VfL Kirchheim/Teck
- 1996–1997: FC Gundelfingen
- 1998–1999: SSV Ulm 1846 (assistant)
- 2007–2008: TSV Neu-Ulm
- 2008–2010: VfL Kirchheim/Teck
- 2010–2011: TV Wiblingen
- FV Asch-Sonderbuch
- 2015: TSV Allmendingen
- 2016–2017: FV Olympia Laupheim
- * Club domestic league appearances and goals

Rolf Baumann (born 14 June 1963) is a German former football coach and former player. He played mainly as a forward, but also as a midfielder. He is the brother of the Olympic athlete and gold medal winner Dieter Baumann.

Baumann first played for local club SC Geislingen and in 1987 he moved to VfB Stuttgart for whom he played three Bundesliga games in the 1987–88 Bundesliga season.

FC Basel suffered relegation after the 1987–88 Nationalliga A season and because many players left their squad, they were hiring new players. Baumann thus joined Basel for their 1988–89 season and signed a three-year professional football contract under head coach Urs Siegenthaler. After playing in seven test games Baumann played his domestic league debut for his new club in the away game on 23 July 1988 as Basel played a 1–1 draw against Zürich. Baumann scored his first goal for his club during the following mis-week match on 27 July in the home game at the Stadion Schützenmatte against Locarno as Basel won 3–0.

Between the years 1988 and 1981 Baumann played 53 games for Basel scoring six goals; 34 games were in the Nationalliga B, five in the Swiss Cup and 14 were friendly games. He scored four goals in the domestic league, one in the cup and the other one during the test games.

Following his time with Basel Baumann ended his active playing career and became coach, first with his club of origin VfL Kirchheim/Teck. In the season 1996–97 he coached FC Gundelfingen and then in the season 1997–98 as assistant to Ralf Rangnick by SSV Ulm 1846. He then tried his trade by various local teams, to last with FV Olympia Laupheim between 2016 and 2017.

== Sources ==
- Die ersten 125 Jahre. Publisher: Josef Zindel im Friedrich Reinhardt Verlag, Basel. ISBN 978-3-7245-2305-5
- Verein "Basler Fussballarchiv" Homepage
