= Germano Fanciulli =

Italian footballer (born 1965)

Personal information
- Date of birth: 28 October 1965 (age 61)
- Positions: Midfielder; forward

Senior career*
Years	Team	Apps	(Gls)
1981–1988	BSC Old Boys		
1988–1991	FC Basel	31	(0)
1991–1992	FC Grenchen	25	(3)
1992–1995	FC Riehen		
- * Club domestic league appearances and goals

Germano Fanciulli (born 28 October 1965) is an Italian footballer who played in the 1980s and 1990s. He played mainly as a forward, but also as a midfielder.

Fanciulli played his youth football with local club BSC Old Boys. He advanced to their first team, who played in the third tier of Swiss football, in the 1981–1982 season. Franciulli played with the Old Boys for six seasons. At the end of the 1986–87 season Franciulli and his team were group champions and achieved promotion to the Nationalliga. After this Franciulli played one more season with the club.

FC Basel were relegated after the 1987–88 Nationalliga A season and because many players left their squad, they were hiring new players. Fanciulli thus joined Basel for their 1988–89 season and signed his first professional football contract under head coach Urs Siegenthaler. After playing in six test games Fanciulli played his domestic league debut for his new club in the away game on 23 July 1988 as Basel played a 1–1 draw against Zürich. During his first season with the club he became a regular starter. However, following the change in the head coach position to new manager Ernst August Künnecke Fanciulli's playing time reduced blatantly.

Between the years 1988 and 1991 Fanciulli played 51 games for Basel without scoring a goal; 31 of these games were in the Nationalliga A, four in the Swiss Cup and 16 were friendly games.

Following his time with Basel, Fanciulli signed for one year with FC Grenchen. He then ended his professional football career and returned to the city of Basel and played with lower tier, local club FC Riehen. After he ended his playing career, he was coach for various local amateur clubs.

== Sources ==
- Die ersten 125 Jahre. Publisher: Josef Zindel im Friedrich Reinhardt Verlag, Basel. ISBN 978-3-7245-2305-5
- Verein "Basler Fussballarchiv" Homepage
