= Bruno Hänni =

Swiss footballer (born 1961)

Personal information
- Full name: Bruno Hänni
- Date of birth: 13 October 1961 (age 65)
- Place of birth: Switzerland
- Position: Midfielder

Senior career*
Years	Team	Apps	(Gls)
1985–1986	FC Oensingen		
1986–1989	FC Basel	67	(3)
- * Club domestic league appearances and goals

Bruno Hänni (born 13 October 1961) is a Swiss retired footballer who played in the 1980s as midfielder.

Hänni first played for FC Oensingen. He joined FC Basel's first team for their 1986–87 season under head-coach Helmut Benthaus. After playing in seven test games, Hänni played his domestic league debut for his new club in the away game on 30 August 1986 as Basel were defeated 0–2 by Luzern.

At the end of the following 1987–88 Nationalliga A season, under manager Urs Siegenthaler, Hänni and his team suffered relegation, but he stayed on with the club. Hänni scored his first league goal for his club on 1 October 1988 as Basel drew away from home against Locarno. He scored his next league goal exactly one week later on 8 October in the home game at the St. Jakob Stadium against Schaffhausen. It was the winning goal of the match as Basel won 1–0.

Hänni played for Basel's first team for three seasons. During this time, Hänni played a total of 103 games for Basel, scoring a total of seven goals. 67 of these games were in the Nationalliga A and B, six were in the Swiss Cup and 30 were friendly games. He scored three goals in the domestic league; the other four were scored during the test games.

== Sources ==
- Die ersten 125 Jahre. Publisher: Josef Zindel im Friedrich Reinhardt Verlag, Basel. ISBN 978-3-7245-2305-5
- Verein "Basler Fussballarchiv" Homepage
