= Remo Brügger =

Swiss footballer (born 1960)

Personal information
- Full name: Remo Brügger
- Date of birth: 6 December 1960 (age 65)
- Place of birth: Switzerland
- Position: Goalkeeper

Senior career*
Years	Team	Apps	(Gls)
1979–1984	SC Zug		
1984–1987	FC Wettingen	88	(0)
1987–1988	FC Luzern	1	(0)
1988–1989	FC Basel	25	(0)
1989–1990	FC St. Gallen	36	(0)
1991–1993	FC Ascona		
- * Club domestic league appearances and goals

Remo Brügger (born 6 December 1960) is a Swiss former footballer who played in the 1980s and early 1990s as goalkeeper.

== Football career ==
Brügger's football career began at the age of 14 and he only became goalie by chance, because the team needed one. But he did his job very well and received call ups for the junior national team.

In 1978, at the age of 17, he became goalkeeper number 1 for SC Zug in the 1st League, at that time the third tier of Swiss football. At the end of the 1982–83 they finished their group in second position and thus qualified for the play-offs for promotion to the Nationalliga B. In first round of the play-offs they defeated BSC Old Boys and in the semi-final they defeated Red Star Zürich. Although they were defeated by Martigny-Sports in the final they achieved promotion. One year later, with the new, young head coach Ottmar Hitzfeld, they ended the 1983–84 season as Nationalliga B champions. Brügger and the team achieved immediate promotion to the Nationalliga A, for the first and only time in the clubs history.

During the pre-season to the 1984–85 Nationalliga A, Brügger moved to the established NLA club FC Wettingen, where he was the regular goalkeeper for three years - until Jörg Stiel ousted him at the end of the 1986–87 season. The following season Brügger signed for Luzern, where he was a substitute for regular goalie Roger Tschudin and only came to one first team appearance in the league.

Brügger joined FC Basel who had just suffered relegation. Under head coach Urs Siegenthaler, Brügger became first team regular goalkeeper in their 1988–89 season. After five test matches, Brügger played his domestic league debut for the club in the away game on 23 July 1988 as Basel played a 1–1 draw against Zürich.

However, Brügger suffered a serious car accident in January 1989. Because he was ruled out of training for over two months, Thomas Grüter was brought in on loan from FC St. Gallen. Because Grüter had convinced trainer Siegenthaler so much, it was Brügger who went to St. Gallen in a player swap during the summer break. During his one season with Basel, Brügger played a total of 34 games for Basel. 25 of these games were in the Nationalliga A, three in the Swiss Cup and six were friendly games.

Brügger was part of the St. Gallen team with Iván Zamorano and Hugo Eduardo Rubio that stormed the unofficial title of "winter champion" in the first stage of the 1989–90 Nationalliga A season. He played his debut on 22 July 1989 in the home match against Sion. His qualities as a goalkeeper were apparent, he was more than able to meet the club's expectations and was undisputed throughout the season. During his season with the club he played 40 competition matches, 36 in the domestic league and four in the Swiss Cup. Nevertheless, his career in St. Gallen ended sobering: In May it was announced that the club would sign Jörg Stiel and that there was no more space for him. Following this Brügger could not find a new club and was still searching in vain during the winter break of 1990–91 and then he ended his professional career and joined FC Ascona.

== The goalie with many lives ==
Agile goalkeepers are often referred to as cats. But that is not Brügger's only association to the animal, because Brügger also appears to have nine lives as well.

At the age of 14, Brügger fell down a 150-meter-high slope while skiing and crashed into a tree. He woke up in hospital four days later. In the accident he suffers a contusion of the brain and a severe brain and skull trauma. At the age of 20, the trained plumber fell eleven meters from the scaffolding and landed on a pallet with bricks. Quotation Brügger: "Virtually everything in the pelvic area was broken and I also had a severe concussion." In January 1989, the then 28-year-old lost control of his car on a country road at excessive speed. It overturned, Brügger was thrown through the windshield, landed on the road and was hit by another car. He got away with abrasions, bruises and a shoulder injury.

As he started working for his brother's scaffolding company in Ticino in 1991, he joined FC Ascona for two seasons. He then played for a short time for FC Minusio until he crashed into a goal post during an intervention and broke his nose - again. Quotation Brügger: "That was the end of my football career."

Brügger is divorced and has one son. Since 2015 he has been living in Davos and works for the general contractor Baulink as «Mädchen für alles» as he calls it. He is a chauffeur, looks after real estate and does manual maintenance work.

== Sources ==
- B for Brügger on FCSG-Data homepage
- Die ersten 125 Jahre. Publisher: Josef Zindel im Friedrich Reinhardt Verlag, Basel. ISBN 978-3-7245-2305-5
- Verein "Basler Fussballarchiv" Homepage
