= Reitplatz =

Sports area in Winterthur, Switzerland

Coordinates: 47°28′17″N 8°42′34″E

Reitplatz is a sports field and recreation area located in Winterthur, Switzerland. Its primary tenant is FC Töss. In addition to football matches, Reitplatz has been used several times for cultural events, such as the Out in the Green Festival in 1994.
