= FC Diepoldsau-Schmitter =

Swiss football club

- Full name: Fussball Club Diepoldsau-Schmitter
- Founded: 1951
- Ground: Rheinauen, Diepoldsau
- Capacity: 1,000
- Chairman: Roman Müller
- Manager: Adrian Spirig
- League: 3. Liga
Home colours	Away colours

Fussball Club Diepoldsau-Schmitter is a football team from Switzerland which has been playing in the Swiss 3. Liga.

== Current squad ==
Note: Flags indicate national team as defined under FIFA eligibility rules; some limited exceptions apply. Players may hold more than one non-FIFA nationality.

No.	Pos.	Nation	Player
—		SUI	Sandro Gilomen
—		SUI	Lars Frei
—		SUI	Kimi Metzler
—		AUT	David Ceraolo
—		SUI	Fabian Besserer
—		ITA	Giuliano Perpoli
—	Centre-back	SUI	Toni Barisic
7	Attacking Midfielder	SUI	Marc Gröber
—		MKD	Esmir Shajnoski
10	Defensive Midfielder	SUI	Cyril Dietsche
—		SRB	David Jevtic

No.	Pos.	Nation	Player
25	Defender	AFG	Ali Jusefi
13	Goalkeeper	SUI	Reto Besserer
—		ITA	Gabriel Caggese
—	Midfielder	ITA	Raffaele Marzano
—		SUI	Willi Durot
—		SRB	Igor Rankovic
12	Centre-back	TUR	Ogün Hot
—		TUR	Mehmet Bakan
20	Attacking Midfielder	SUI	Sandro Sonderegger
—		AUT	Gabriel Drinovac
—		ITA	Giuliano Aloi

== Staff and board members ==
- Trainer: Davide Ceraolo
- Physio: Michaela Wüst
- President: Roman Müller
- Vice President: Adrian Spirig
- Groundsman: Romeo Schmid
