= Andy Halter =

Swiss footballer (born 1966)

Personal information
- Full name: André Halter
- Date of birth: 21 April 1966 (age 60)
- Place of birth: Lucerne, Switzerland
- Height: 1.81 m (5 ft 11 in)
- Position: Forward

Senior career*
Years	Team	Apps	(Gls)
1982–1988	Luzern	63	(24)
1988–1992	Grasshopper	30	(8)

International career
1986–1989	Switzerland	9	(1)
- * Club domestic league appearances and goals

André "Andy" Halter (born 21 April 1966) is a Swiss former footballer who played as a forward and made nine appearances for the Switzerland national team.

== Career ==
Halter made his debut for Switzerland on 9 April 1986 in a friendly match against West Germany, which finished as a 0–1 loss. He went on to make nine appearances, scoring one goal, before making his last appearance on 7 June 1989 in a 1990 FIFA World Cup qualification match against Czechoslovakia, which finished as a 0–1 loss.

== Career statistics ==
=== International ===
Switzerland
Year	Apps	Goals
1986	6	0
1987	2	1
1989	1	0
Total	9	1

=== International goals ===
No.	Date	Venue	Opponent	Score	Result	Competition
1	17 June 1987	Stade olympique de la Pontaise, Lausanne, Switzerland	Sweden	1–0	1–1	UEFA Euro 1988 qualifying
