= Markus Hodel =

Swiss footballer (born 1961)

Personal information
- Full name: Markus Hodel
- Date of birth: 4 May 1961 (age 65)
- Place of birth: Basle, Switzerland
- Height: 1.79 m (5 ft 10 in)
- Position: Defender

Youth career
- 1976-1979 (Swiss junior champion 1979): SC Binningen

Senior career*
Years	Team	Apps	(Gls)
1983–1985	FC Concordia Basel	97	(5)
1985–1986	FC Nordstern Basel	64	(4)
1986–1990	FC Basel	254	(2)

International career
	U18	15	
- * Club domestic league appearances and goals

Markus Hodel (born 4 May 1961) is a Swiss retired footballer who played in the 1980s. He played as defender.

Hodel was selected for the regional team (Nordwest-Schweiz Auswahl) in 1975 and played later 15 matches for the Swiss junior national team.

Hodel played for three years (1980–1982) for FC Binningen & two years from 1983 to 1985 for FC Concordia Basel in the 1st League. In the summer of 1985 he moved on to play for local rivals FC Nordstern Basel in the same division, before he moved on again one year later.

Hodel joined FC Basel's first team for their 1986–87 season under head-coach Helmut Benthaus. After playing in four test games, Hodel played his domestic league debut for his new club in the home game in the St. Jakob Stadium on 3 September 1986 as Basel won 5–3 against Zürich.

At the end of the following 1987–88 Nationalliga A season, under manager Urs Siegenthaler, Hodel and his team suffered relegation, but he stayed on with the club. Hodel scored his first goal for them on 3 September 1988 in the Swiss Cup, in the home game as Basel won 4–1 against Young Boys.

Hodel stayed with the club for five seasons. Between the years 1986 and 1990 Hodel played a total of 254 games for Basel scoring a total of two goals. 184 of these games were in the Nationalliga A, nine in the Swiss Cup and 37 were friendly games. He was awarded with 'Best player of the season 1988' by the FC Basel fan club. He didn't score a goal in the domestic league, but one in the cup and the other was scored during the test games.

Although he passed his exam as a coach/manager to train up to the highest amateur league he did not pursue that career path.

== Sources ==
- Die ersten 125 Jahre. Publisher: Josef Zindel im Friedrich Reinhardt Verlag, Basel. ISBN 978-3-7245-2305-5
- Verein "Basler Fussballarchiv" Homepage
