= Manuel Navarro Luna =

Cuban poet

Manuel Navarro Luna (29 August 1894 – 15 June 1966) was a Cuban poet and journalist.
