= Beat Aebi =

Swiss footballer (born 1966)

Personal information
- Full name: Beat Aebi
- Date of birth: 17 April 1966 (age 60)
- Place of birth: Switzerland
- Positions: Midfielder; forward

Senior career*
Years	Team	Apps	(Gls)
1987–1988	FC Volketswil		
1988–1990	FC Basel	26	(3)
- * Club domestic league appearances and goals

Beat Aebi (born 17 April 1966) is a Swiss former footballer who played in the late 1980s and early 1990s. He played mainly as a forward, but also as a midfielder.

Aebi first played for local club FC Volketswil. FC Basel had been relegated after the 1988–89 Nationalliga A season and because many players left their squad, they were hiring new players. Aebi thus joined Basel for their 1988–89 season under head coach Urs Siegenthaler. After playing in seven test games Aebi made his domestic league debut for his new club in the home game at the Stadion Schützenmatte on 27 July 1988 against Locarno. Aebi scored his first goal for his club during the same game as Basel won 3–0.

He stayed with the club for two seasons and during this time played 46 games and scored four goals; 26 games were in the Nationalliga A, 5 in the Swiss Cup and 15 were friendly games. He scored three goals in the domestic league, the other during the cup match on 20 August 1988 against local club FC Oberwil.

After his time in Basel, Aebi returned home to Volketswil and he later coached a number of local clubs and was trainer to FC Volketswil's first team.

== Sources ==
- Die ersten 125 Jahre. Publisher: Josef Zindel im Friedrich Reinhardt Verlag, Basel. ISBN 978-3-7245-2305-5
- Verein "Basler Fussballarchiv" Homepage
