= Axel Thoma =

German footballer

Personal information
- Date of birth: 5 September 1964 (age 62)
- Height: 1.80 m (5 ft 11 in)
- Position: Forward

Senior career*
Years	Team	Apps	(Gls)
1984–1985	VfB Stuttgart		
1986–1992	FC Schaffhausen		
1992–1993	FC Winterthur		
1993–1998	FC Singen 04		

Managerial career
- 2007–2010: FC Wil 1900 (youth)
- 2009: FC Wil 1900 (caretaker)
- 2010–2014: FC Wil 1900
- 2014–2015: Grasshoppers (director of sports)
- 2016: FC Schaffhausen
- 2018–2019: FC Schaffhausen (executive director)
- * Club domestic league appearances and goals

Axel Thoma (born 5 September 1964) is a German football manager and former player who played as a forward.
