= Mario Moscatelli =

Swiss footballer (born 1963)

Personal information
- Full name: Mario Moscatelli
- Date of birth: 27 September 1963 (age 63)
- Place of birth: St. Gallen
- Positions: Goalkeeper; defender; midfielder; striker

Senior career*
Years	Team	Apps	(Gls)
1983–1984	FC St. Gallen	1	(0)
1984–1986	FC Biel-Bienne	50	(11)
1986–1988	FC St. Gallen	40	(1)
1988–1990	FC Basel	65	(18)
1990–1992	FC Schaffhausen	25	(6)
1992–1993	FC Winterthur	2	(0)
- * Club domestic league appearances and goals

Mario Moscatelli (born 27 September) is a Swiss former footballer who played in the 1980s and early 1990s. He played as midfielder.

Born in St. Gallen Moscatelli played his youth football for a local club and joined FC St. Gallen's first team in the 1983–84 Nationalliga A season. But because of the teams existing formation, Moscatelli did not get much domestic league playing time and therefore he moved on to FC Biel-Bienne, who at that time played in the second tier if Swiss football. Here he became a regular starter and played two seasons before returning to his club of origin, where he stayed for two seasons.

FC Basel had been relegated after the 1988–89 Nationalliga A season and because many players left their squad, they were hiring new players. Moscatelli thus joined Basel for their 1988–89 season under head coach Urs Siegenthaler. After playing in eight test games Moscatelli played his domestic league debut for his new club in the away game on 23 July 1988 as Basel played a 1–1 draw against Zürich. He scored his first goal for the club one week later on 30 July in the away game against Schaffhausen as Basel won 3–1.

Between the years 1988 and 1990 Moscatelli played a total of 98 games for Basel scoring a total of 29 goals. 65 of these games were in the Nationalliga B, seven in the Swiss Cup and 26 were friendly games. He scored 18 goal in the domestic league, two in the cup and the other nine were scored during the test games.

Following his time with Basel, Moscatelli signed for two years with FC Schaffhausen and spent one season with FC Winterthur

== Sources ==
- Mario Moscatelli at WorldFootball.net
- Die ersten 125 Jahre. Publisher: Josef Zindel im Friedrich Reinhardt Verlag, Basel. ISBN 978-3-7245-2305-5
- Verein "Basler Fussballarchiv" Homepage
