= Baden thermal baths =

Thermal springs in Switzerland

47°28′36.21″N 8°18′36.71″E

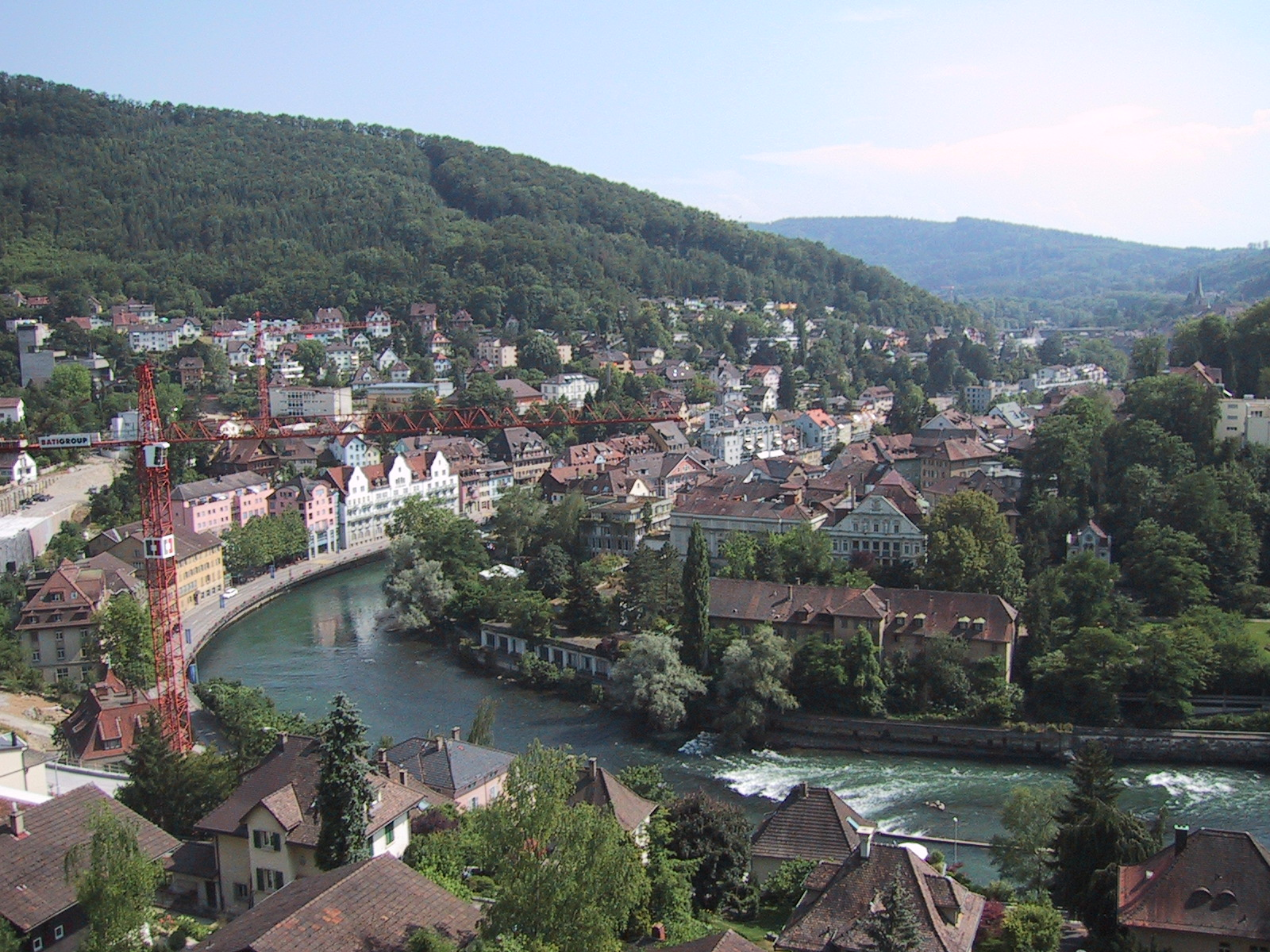
View of the bathing quarter on both sides of the Limmat (2005); Baden on the right, Ennetbaden on the left

The Baden thermal baths are the oldest known hot springs in Switzerland. They are located in Baden and neighboring Ennetbaden in the canton of Aargau, on both sides of a prominent bend in the Limmat river. At the intersection between the Swiss Plateau and the Folded Jura, the thermal water flows through layers of shell limestone and rises to the surface in the spring area through fissures in the Keuper layer above. Of the total of 21 springs, 18 are located in Baden and three in Ennetbaden. The water has an average temperature of 46.6 °C and contains a particularly high proportion of calcium and sulphates. With a total mineralization of 4450 mg/l, it is the richest in minerals in the entire country.

The Celts were the first to use the healing powers of thermal water during the late Latène period. At the beginning of the 1st century, the Romans built important thermal baths, in the immediate vicinity of which the small town settlement of Aquae Helveticae was established. It is possible that bathing continued uninterrupted in late antiquity and the early Middle Ages. There have been written sources about the baths since the 13th century. During Habsburg rule and after the conquest of Aargau by the Swiss Confederates, Baden was one of the most important spas in Europe and was visited by numerous high-ranking individuals. It was not least because of the baths that the Confederates held their most important conventions here from 1416.

The attraction began to wane from around 1500 and reached its first low point towards the end of the 18th century. In the 19th century, Baden's baths once again experienced a heyday when spa treatments became a mass phenomenon. Massive investment in hotels and bathing facilities increased their appeal and attracted a wealthy international clientele during the Belle Époque. The decline began during the First World War and accelerated from the 1950s onwards. Baden missed out on modern developments and around the year 2000 the spa business almost came to a complete standstill.

The historic spa district is dominated by 19th and early 20th century spa architecture characterized by classicism and historicism, while only traces of the Gothic and Baroque buildings of the late Middle Ages and early modern period remain. At the beginning of the 21st century, the area was in need of redevelopment. New impetus was provided by a revitalization project that was opened in November 2021 and includes a new spa designed by architect Mario Botta. At the same time, publicly accessible bathing fountains were inaugurated in Baden and Ennetbaden.

== Location ==
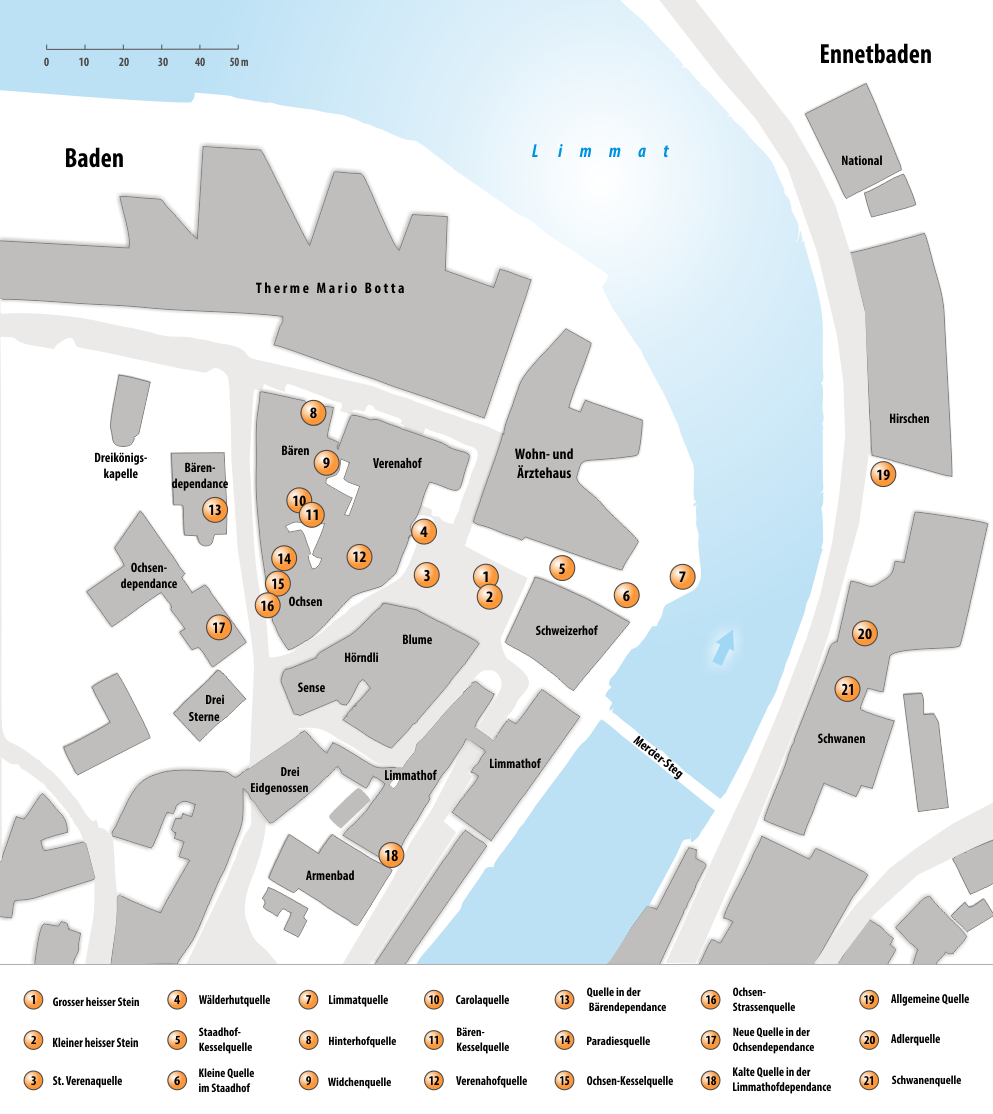
Overview map of the spa district with location of the springs (2017)

The bathing quarter, as the area around the thermal springs is known, lies on both sides of the Limmat at an altitude of around 360 meters above sea level, with the town of Baden on the left bank and the municipality of Ennetbaden on the right (Ennetbaden belonged to Baden until 1819). The fast-flowing Limmat, which is squeezed into a narrow riverbed, comes from the south. In the source area, it reaches the foot of the steeply rising “Goldwand”, which is partly planted with vines, where it changes direction and turns to the west.

The “ Great Baths” of Baden, the western part of the baths district, are located on a step in the terrain on the inside of the narrow bend in the river. The Mättelipark delimits the area to the west, while a batter on the south-western side forms a natural boundary to the Haselfeld, which is around 20 meters higher. The spa gardens with the Kursaal and the Baden Spa Theater are located there. The “ Little Baths” of Ennetbaden, the eastern part of the spa district, consist of a row of houses along the riverbank.

Two bridges cross the river. The inclined bridge, opened in 1874, has an incline of 7.5% to compensate for the nine-metre difference in height between the Baden bank and the lower-lying Ennetbaden bank. The Mercier footbridge, named after the French bath masseur Henri Mercier, who was also a local historian, has been in existence since 1968.

== Geology ==
The thermal springs are among the best studied in Switzerland. To this day, it has not been completely clarified where the water seeps away and returns to the surface. Baden and Ennetbaden lie at the intersection of the Swiss Mittelland and the Jura folds, which is reflected in the pronounced fold formation. The Lägern, a mountain range up to 866 m high, dominates the area and extends about ten kilometers eastward from the banks of the Limmat. Most of its rocks are from the Jurassic and Triassic periods. The latter is divided (from bottom to top) into layers of red sandstone, Muschelkalk and Keuper.

Minerals of the thermal water
| Cations | mg/l | Anions | mg/l |
|---|---|---|---|
| Ammonium | 0.78 | Fluoride | 3.1 |
| Lithium | 4.8 | Chloride | 1185 |
| Sodium | 720 | Bromide | 2.5 |
| Potassium | 663 | Iodide | 0.009 |
| Magnesium | 99 | Nitrate | < 0.5 |
| Calcium | 503 | Bicarbonate | 487 |
| Strontium | 6.2 | Sulphate | 1375 |
| Iron | 0.013 | Hydrogen phosphate | 0.05 |
| Manganese | 0.016 | Hydrogen arsenate | 0.1 |
| Copper | < 0.005 | Molybdenum | < 0.005 |
| Zinc | < 0.01 | | |
| Lead | 0.002 | | |
| Aluminium | 0.018 | | |

In the spring area, the water-bearing shell limestone layer reaches 28 meters below the surface. It is overlain by impermeable Keuper and glacial gravel. Due to constant erosion by the Limmat and tectonic faults, the Keuper in this area is heavily fissured, so that the thermal water can escape despite the lack of shell limestone outcrops. This occurs under high artesian pressure: on the Ennetbaden side, for example, the pressure level is ten meters above the water level of the Limmat. The springs form an interconnected system based on the principle of communicating vessels: If one spring is regulated or a new outlet is created, this has an impact on the output of all the other springs. Changes to the spring intakes and interventions in the Keuper layer can have serious consequences, in the worst case scenario causing all the springs to dry up.

According to current knowledge, the thermal water of Baden is almost entirely precipitation water that has remained in the ground for varying lengths of time. Analyses of radioactive isotopes indicate four components. The largest portion is water that is more than 1000 years old and contains minerals from evaporite rocks of the Middle Triassic. It originates mainly from the Jura to the west and reaches the crystalline basement through eastward overthrust areas, where it rises again. It is possible that some of this crystalline water comes from the Black Forest to the north. For this to be the case, it would have to flow beneath the poorly permeable Permo-Carboniferous trough of northern Switzerland. There is also valley groundwater a few years old with a lower mineral content, fissure groundwater from the shell limestone layers of the Müseren plateau on the western edge of the city, and a small amount of deep groundwater from granite layers several kilometers deep.

== Characteristics of the thermal water ==
On average, the amount of thermal water escaping is about 700 l/min, or about one million liters per day. Occasional fluctuations between 600 and 900 l/min may occur, but extreme values of 540 and 980 l/min have also been measured. The amount of effusion is related to the amount of precipitation, with an interval of about ten to eleven months. The amount of spring water shows less pronounced fluctuations than the amount of precipitation. Individual months with low and high rainfall therefore have less impact than longer periods of dry and wet weather. The clear thermal water has a noticeable odor of hydrogen sulfide, although the intensity of the odor can vary depending on the source or pipe. The taste, on the other hand, is not particularly characteristic.

The thermal water is characterized by a high total mineralization of 4450 mg/l and is considered the richest in minerals in Switzerland. The calcium and sulfate content is particularly high. The high calcium content and the salt deposits resulting from the oxidation of the spring gases cause significant sinter deposits in the area of the springs and in all the installations that come into contact with the water. The average temperature of the water is 46.6°C, with variations between 45 and 49°C depending on the source. The water is slightly acidic, with a pH of 6.43. It has a positive general effect on the whole organism, especially on the autonomic nervous system. Bath cures are particularly suitable for rheumatic complaints, mechanical damage, certain neurological diseases and metabolic disorders.

There are 18 springs, two of which are in Ennetbaden. Two springs in Baden and one in Ennetbaden are not used. All 21 springs are located in an area on both sides of the Limmat River that stretches 180 meters from west to east and 50 meters from north to south. The most productive spring is the Grosse Heisse Stein in the middle of the main square of the bathing quarter, named after a huge slab of stone that covers the mouth of the spring. The Limmat spring, which once flowed into the river, is tapped directly from the riverbank. In the Middle Ages, the St. Verena spring was considered particularly beneficial for infertility, which is why it is named after St. Verena, the patron saint of conjugal love. A special feature is the cold spring in the Limmathof dependency, which is no longer used: although its water is identical in composition to that of the other springs, it is significantly cooler, at 21.5°C.

== Architecture of the baths district ==
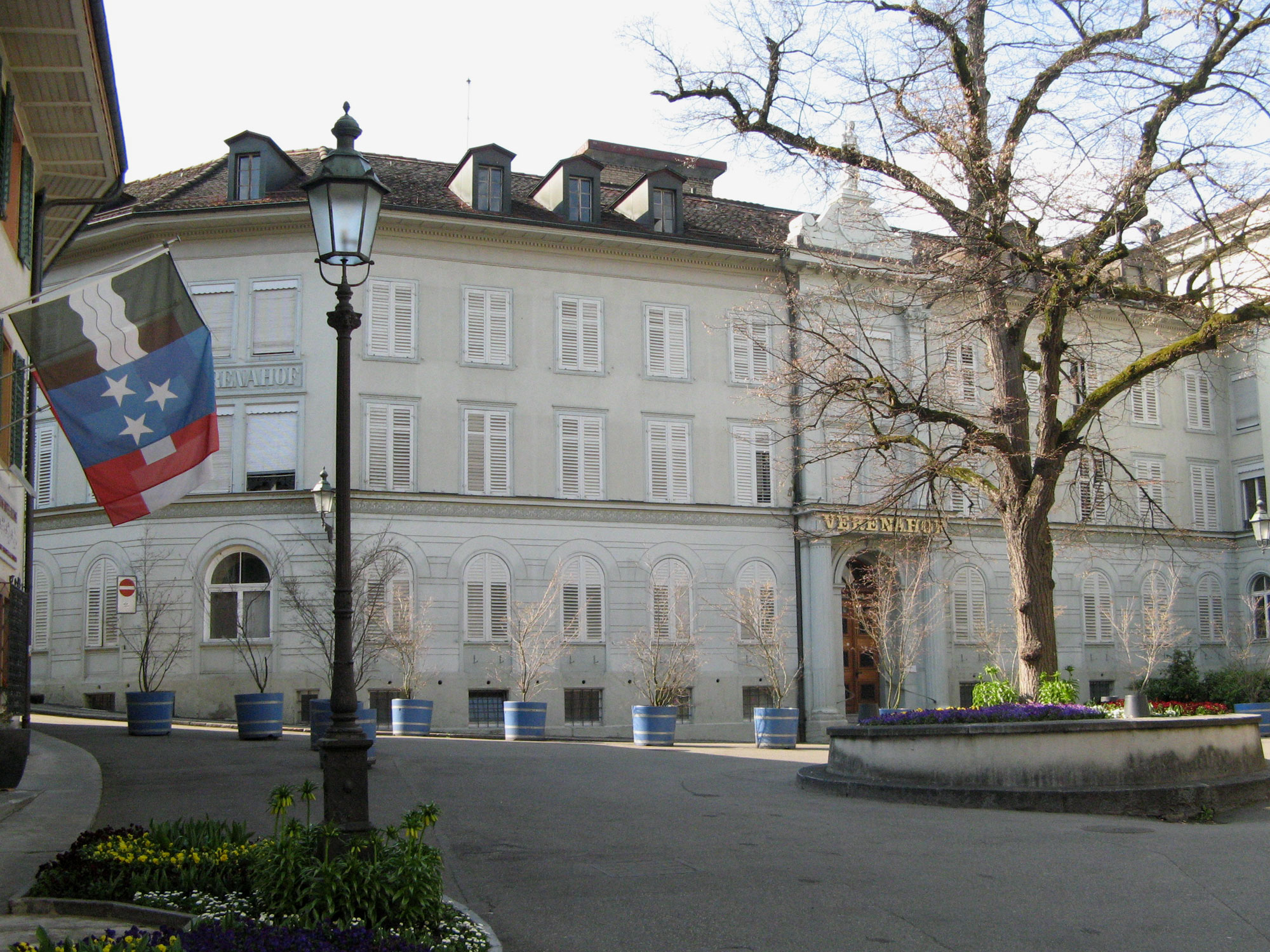
Hotel Verenahof

The Baden part of the bathing quarter is geographically isolated from the rest of the city due to its location on the inner side of the Limmat knee and below an embankment. The buildings grouped around the Kurplatz, the Bäderstrasse and the Limmatpromenade are densely packed and partly interlocked. While only traces of the Gothic and Baroque buildings of the late Middle Ages and early modern period remain, the Classicist and Historicist spa architecture of the 19th century predominates. There are architectural references to Ennetbaden on the opposite bank of the river.

=== Kurplatz ===
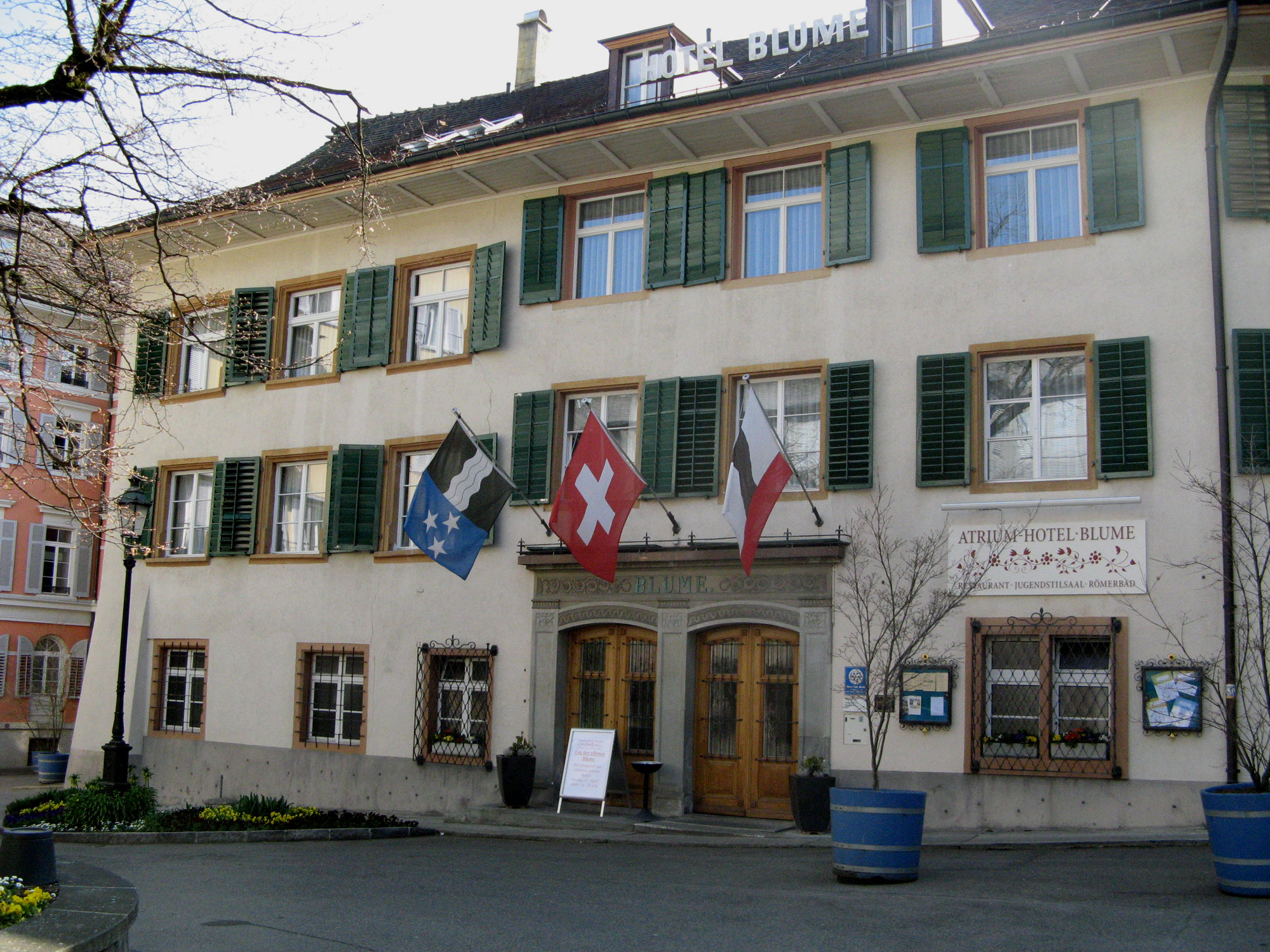
Hotel Blume

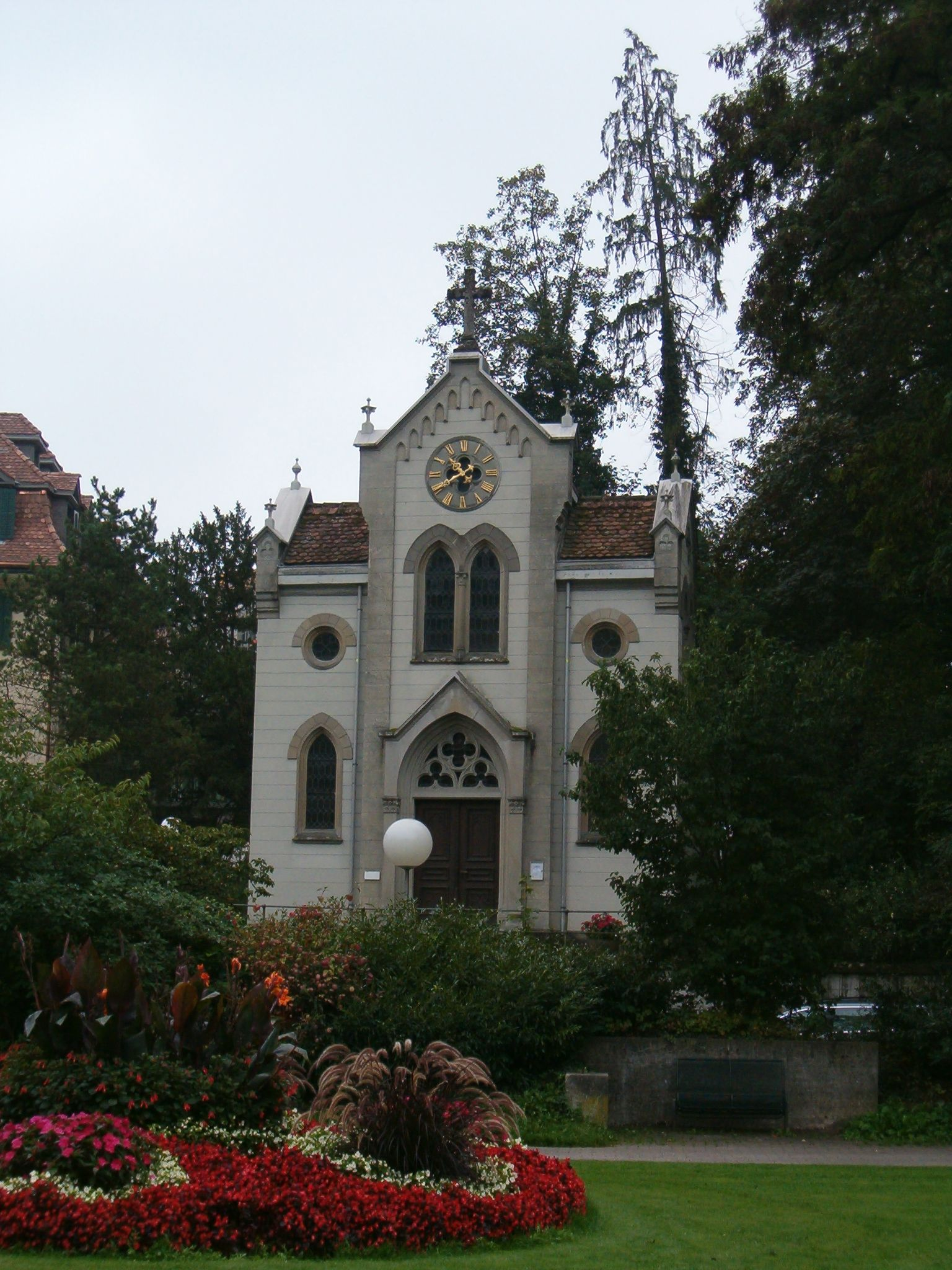
Three Kings Chapel

The Kurplatz is the center of the spa district on the Baden side and is dominated by the three-story Hotel Verenahof. Following the discovery of a new spring, it was built in 1844/45 on the foundations of two older inns ("Zum Löwen" and "Zum Halbmond") dating from the mid-14th century. Designed by Joseph Caspar Jeuch, the strictly classical building was extended in 1872 when the neighboring inn "Zur Sonne" was demolished and a new main entrance in the form of a risalit portal was added. A statue of Verena, probably the work of the sculptor Robert Dorer, stands on the gable decorated with volutes. The hotel, which has been vacant since 2002, will be completely gutted, leaving only the facades, the roof and the atriums. There were plans to add a glass dome, but the cantonal heritage authorities refused permission.

First mentioned in 1421, the Hotel Blume is the only hotel in continuous operation. The neo-Renaissance south wing is based on an Italian palazzo. It was redesigned by Robert Moser in 1872, while the other neoclassical parts of the building date from around 1800. Inside, there is an atrium with a glass roof and an allegorical mural. The Schweizerhof (known as the Raben until 1855) dates from around 1300 and is the oldest known inn in Baden. Around 1830, the existing late medieval semi-detached house was demolished and replaced by a simple Biedermeier building. In 1910 it was rebuilt and extended in the Heimatstil.

=== Bäderstrasse ===
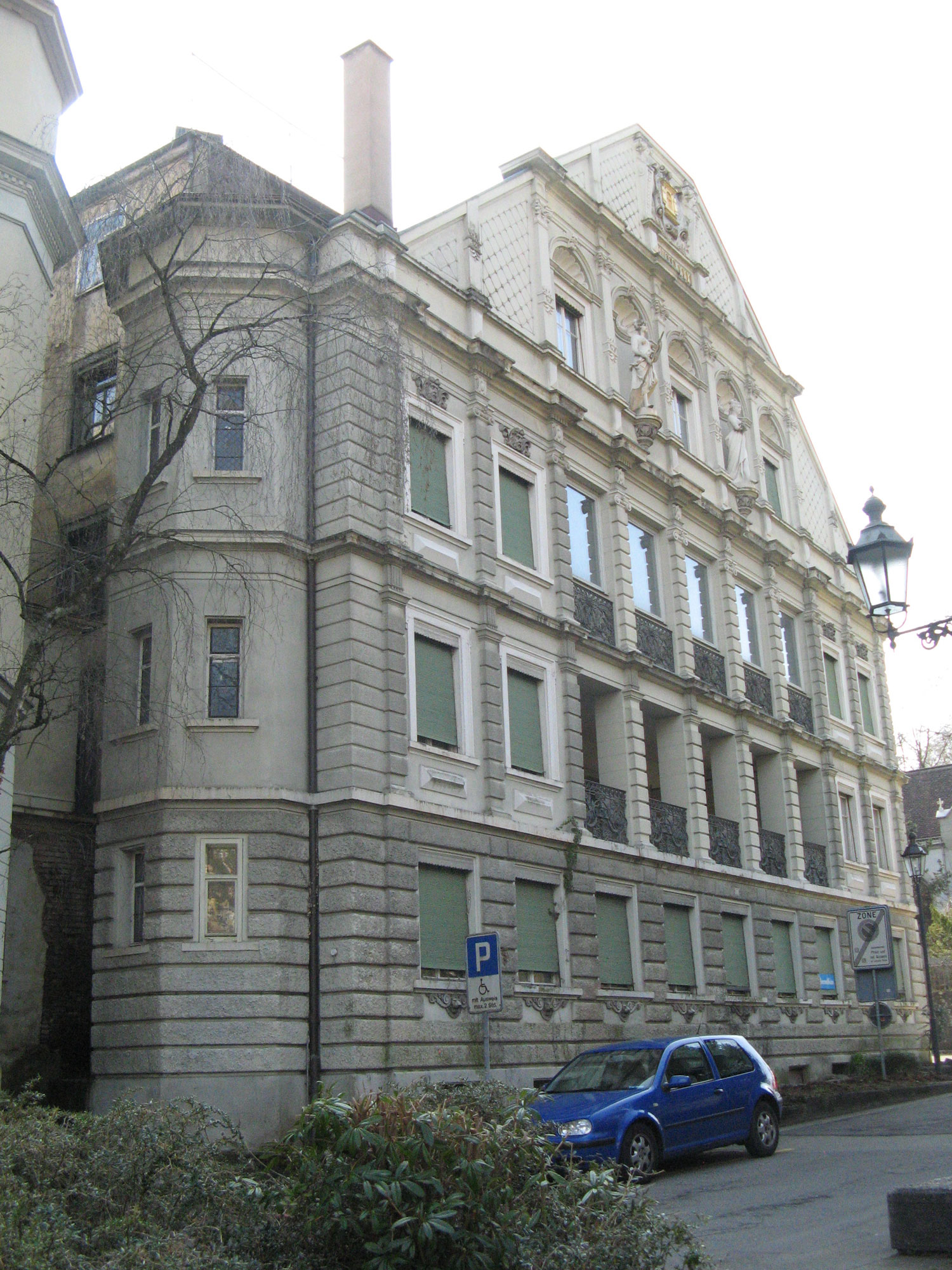
Show facade of the Hotel Bären

The Three Kings Chapel stands on a terrace at the northern end of Bäderstrasse. The building, designed by Robert Moser, was built in 1882 in the neo-Gothic style. Its front part is designed as a gabled porch with lateral transverse annexes. The altarpiece in the choir is a work by Joseph Balmer from 1887 and depicts the Three Kings. The chapel replaced the previous Romanesque building a few meters to the north, which dated back to around 1100 and had been left to decay for decades before finally having to make way for the park of the Grand Hôtel. This luxury hotel, located between the northern end of Bäderstrasse and the banks of the Limmat, opened in 1876, went bankrupt more than six decades later, and was demolished in 1944. Its annex, the Römerbad, dating from 1860, remained until it was finally demolished in 2017 to make way for the new thermal baths designed by Mario Botta.

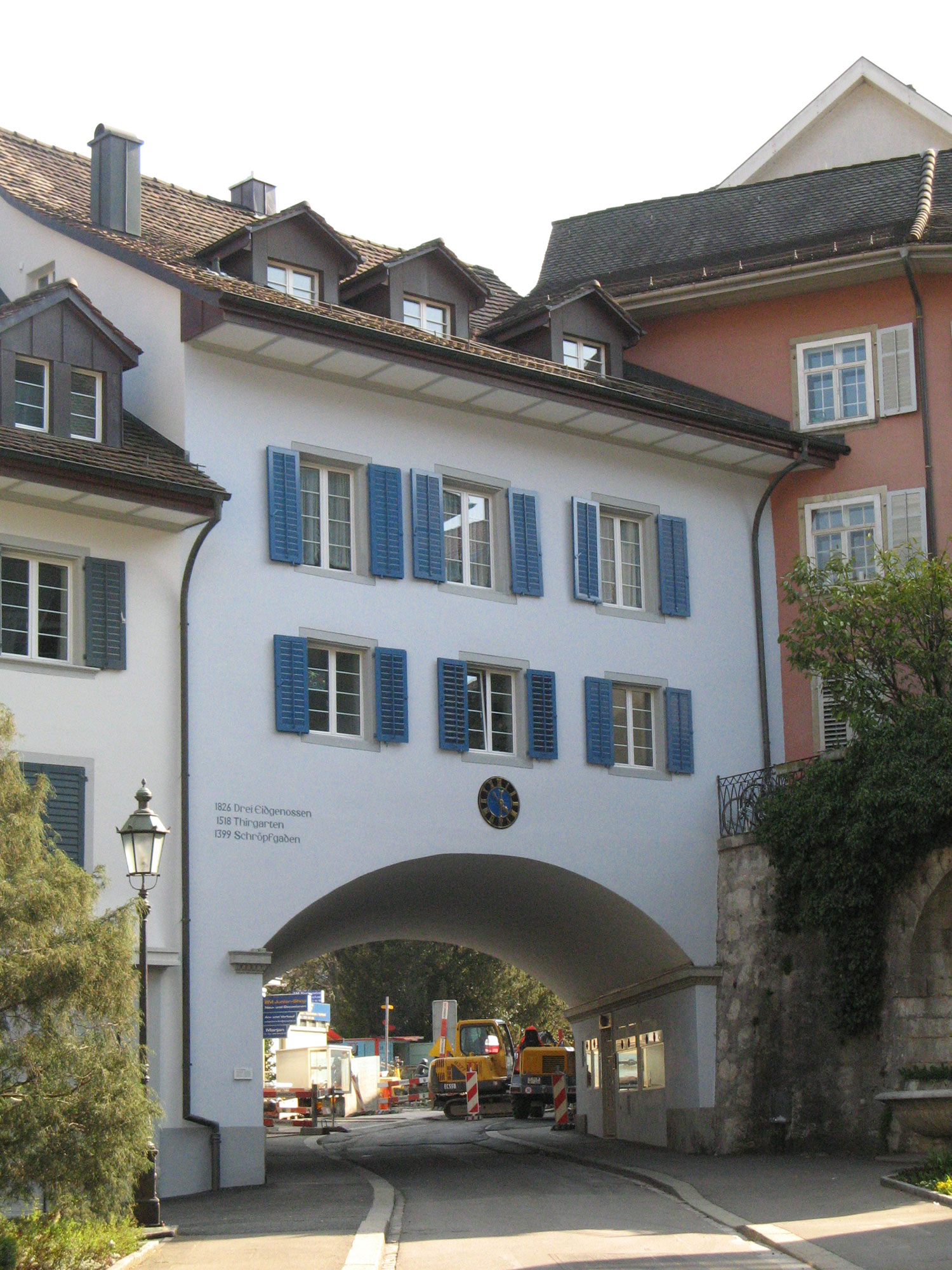
House "Three Confederates" with gate

The Hotel Bären, first mentioned as a bathhouse in 1361, was completely rebuilt after a fire in 1569. The wings were built directly above the medieval bath vaults. The north wing is preceded by a nine-axis facade porch. The then owner had it built in 1881 so that his business would have something to contrast with the Grand Hôtel, at least externally. The mighty façade is hierarchically structured by columns and is one of the most outstanding examples of Neo-Renaissance architecture in Switzerland, with its richly detailed decorations focusing on water and health. The hotel, which has been vacant since 1987, will be renovated and connected to the Verenahof; the façade will be retained. Attached to the Bären is the Hotel Ochsen, also built in 1569, whose Baroque exterior with scattered Renaissance elements has been largely preserved to the present day (with the exception of the late Classicist entrance area). On the other side of the Bäderstrasse are two simpler buildings, the Bärendependance and the Ochsendependance.

In 1826, shortly before the construction of the new Bäderstrasse, the houses "Tiergarten" and "Schröpfgaden" were demolished and replaced by the house " Three Confederates". With its wide arched passageway, it is modeled on a medieval city gate. Since 1829, a neoclassical fountain has stood next to the gate in the niche of a retaining wall. It was made by the workshop of Hieronymus Moser in Würenlos and consists of an oval basin and a base in the form of a columnar drum.

Just outside the historic spa district is the house "Zum Schiff", built in 1834 by an unknown architect. Built into the steep slope facing the Limmat, this neoclassical building was for a time considered one of the most elegant hotels in Baden. In 1847, a banquet was held here to celebrate the opening of Switzerland's first railway line. From 1928 to 2000 it was used as a sanatorium by the Swiss Accident Insurance Institute. The neighboring house "Zum Freihof" was also built in 1834 and rebuilt in 1861/62 by Joseph Caspar Jeuch. In 1890, the Canton of Aargau took over the hotel and turned it into a public spa for the needy. Today, after several renovations, it is a private rehabilitation clinic. The two buildings face the Kurpark, which separates the spa district from the city center. In the middle of the park is the Kursaal, built in 1875 by Robert Moser, which has been used by the Grand Casino Baden since 2002.

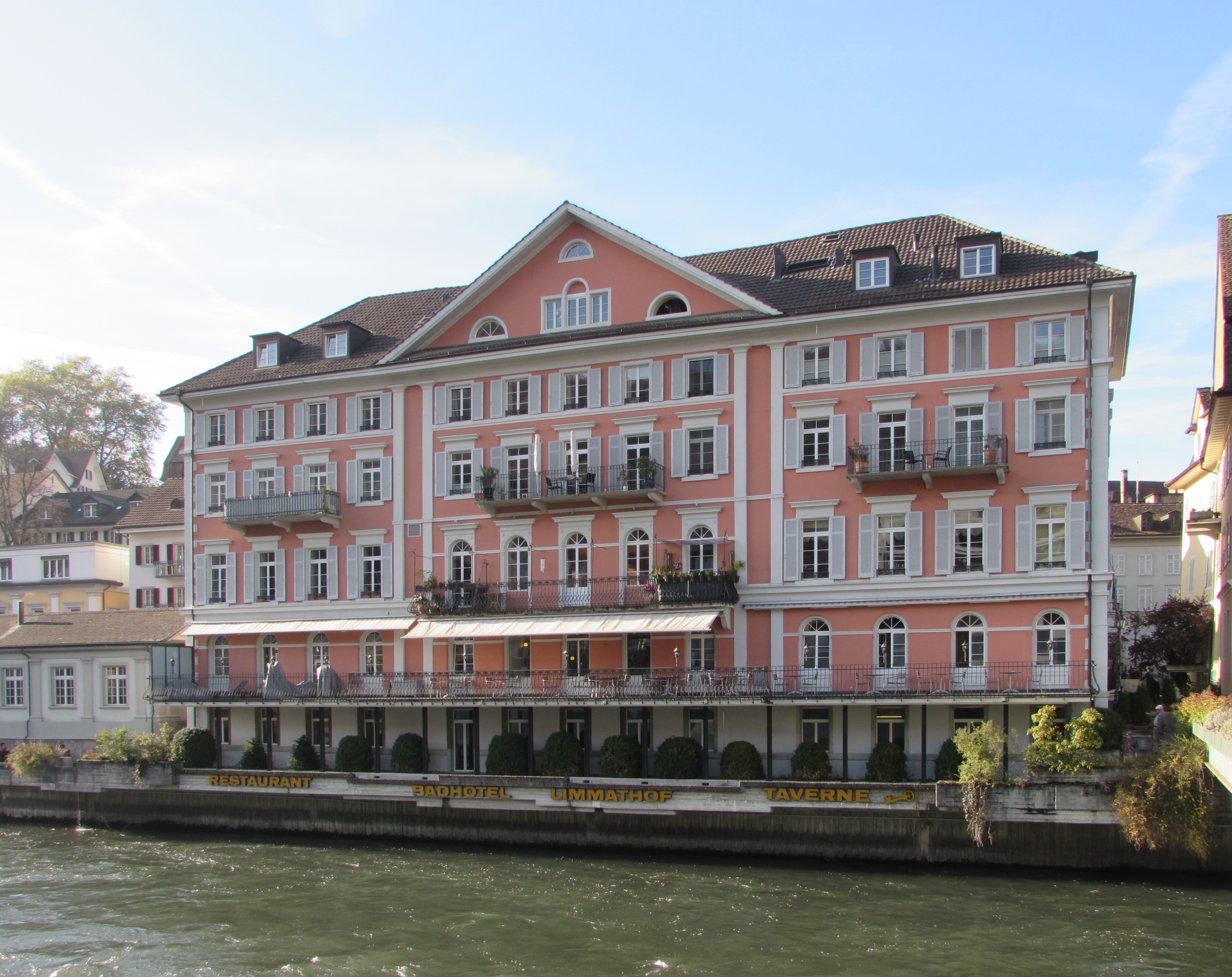
Hotel Limmathof

=== Limmat promenade ===
The Limmat Promenade begins near the Old Town and runs along the left bank of the river to Kurplatz. Directly north of the Leaning Bridge is the hall-like " Municipal Inhalatorium ". Built in 1835 in classicist style, the single-storey, elongated building is divided into 13 axes by Tuscan sandstone pilasters. It was originally used for drinking cures, but from 1851 it was also used for bathing. Bathing ceased in 1987; since the subsequent complete renovation, the northern section has housed the newly established spa archives. The very simple baths for the poor opposite date from 1836.

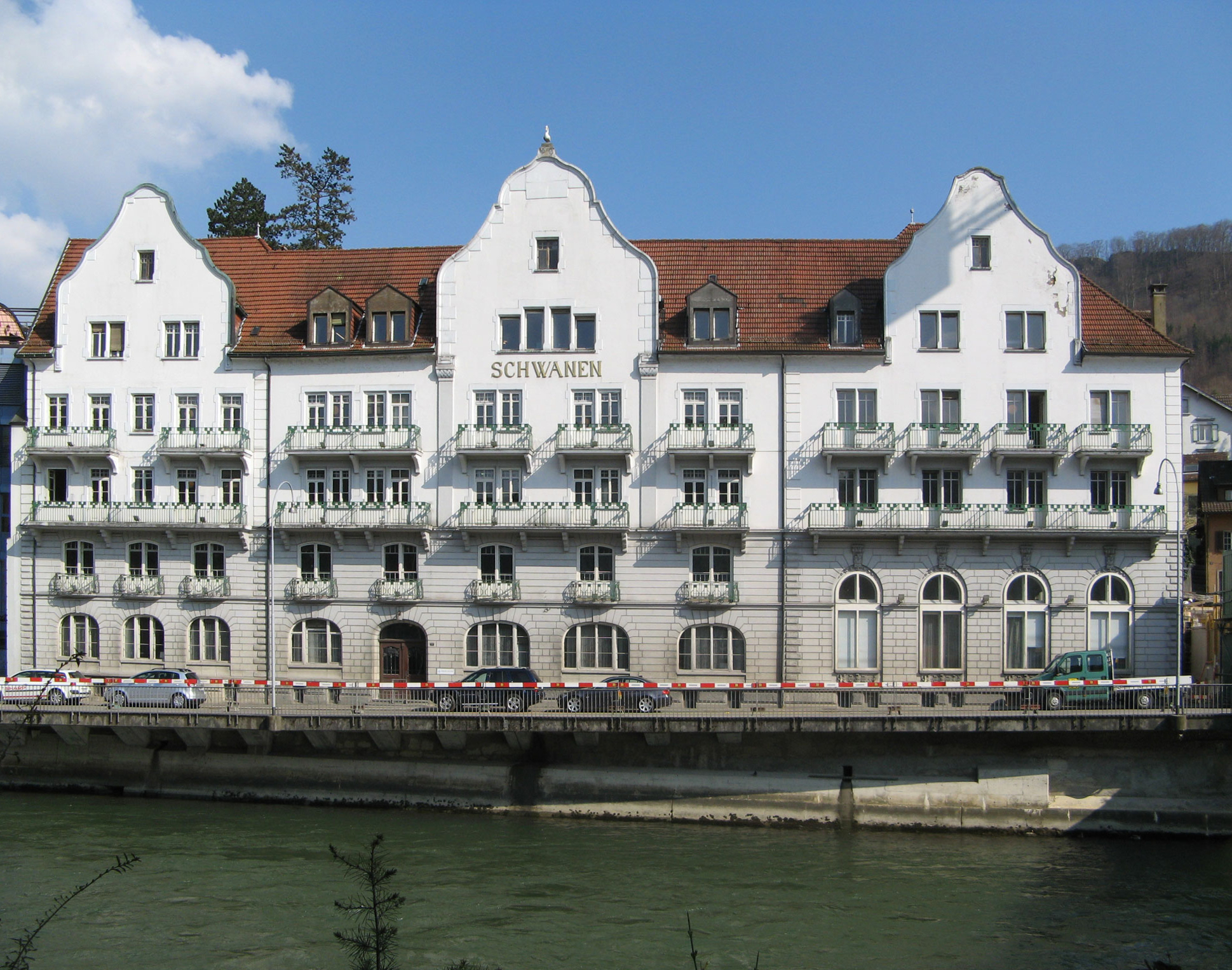
Hotel Schwanen

Between the Inhalatorium and the Mercier footbridge, the Hotel Limmathof dominates the silhouette of the baths district in a decisive position. The four-storey frontage facing the river with its thirteen window axes, hip roof and striking transverse gable makes a particular contribution to this. The imposing building with its strict neoclassical forms was built in 1834/35. The terrace porch on the first floor was added in 1910 and extended to the full width of the frontage in 1965. The design language corresponds to that of a small villa, which was transferred to a large scale. The hall on the second floor is decorated with sumptuous neo-baroque stucco work. A two-storey connecting bridge, built in 1846, leads across the street to the Limmathofdependance with the “Goldener Schlüssel” restaurant, which was built at the same time.

=== Ennetbaden ===
The architecture in Ennetbaden is half urban and half rural. The Hotel Schwanen near the Mercier pedestrian bridge was built in 1842/43 as a branch of a defunct hotel and expanded in several stages to its present size by 1910. The facade is a Biedermeier counterpart to the Limmathof on the other side of the river. The four-storey building appears symmetrical at first glance, but reveals numerous irregularities due to the structure of the previous buildings. The roof is characterized by three striking two-story Art Nouveau cross gables. Hotel operations ceased in 1976 and are scheduled to resume at the end of 2017 following a CHF 60 million renovation that will also include rental apartments and condominiums.

The adjacent Hotel Hirschen to the north was replaced by a modern new building in 2009. The Hirschenplatz in between, which was once the focal point of the Little Baths, was also redesigned. The eye-catcher is a fountain designed by Karl Otto Hügin in 1942, which is made up of several thousand mosaic stones. The restored fountain previously stood inside the demolished hotel and depicts a bathing scene.

== History ==
=== Prehistoric use ===
People began to live in the region in the Mesolithic period, between 11,500 and 8,000 years ago, with denser settlement beginning in the later Neolithic period, 4,500 years ago. It is believed that the open springs and their healing properties were already known to people at that time. Ritual acts such as ritual baths and purification ceremonies were probably also performed. Whether attempts were made to tap the springs during the Bronze Age has not yet been proven. During the Hallstatt period (around 800 B.C.), a Celtic settlement was established in the Kappelerhof quarter, half a kilometer to the west of the baths. Its inhabitants regularly visited the springs, as evidenced by numerous coins and pottery from the Late La Tène period.

=== Roman thermal baths of Aquae Helveticae ===
After the Augustan Alpine campaigns, the Romans occupied the Swiss plateau in 15 BC. They established a base in present-day Windisch, which the Legio XIII Gemina expanded into the military camp of Vindonissa in 14 AD. Around the turn of the century, the settlement of Aquae Helveticae was founded five kilometers to the east on the Haselfeld. The first Roman construction work on the springs can also be traced back to this time. Extensive construction work in the years 18 to 21 is associated with the construction of larger thermal baths; further expansion followed between 29 and 33. The unstable ground in the northeastern part of the site required extensive rebuilding and new construction around 56. The legionaries made extensive use of the baths. They probably carried out most of the construction work themselves, since only the army had the necessary construction and architectural skills. This is also indicated by the massive construction method and the mass use of fired clay bricks, typical of the Mediterranean region.

In the Histories, Tacitus writes that the Legio XXI Rapax stationed in Vindonissa in 69, the year of the Four Emperors, destroyed a nearby spa "built like a small city and much frequented for its curative waters". It is very likely that he was referring to Aquae Helveticae. Indeed, extensive traces of fire can be found in the Haselfeld and in Ennetbaden at that time. The thermal baths themselves seem to have been unaffected. The settlement was quickly rebuilt and became a prosperous place. The army withdrew from Vindonissa in 101, but the absence of military customers had no effect. The thermal baths experienced their heyday in the 2nd and early 3rd centuries. Tourism formed the economic basis of the town, and its location on the bridge over the Limmat also boosted local trade and commerce. There are almost no written sources about the visitors, so we can only speculate about their origins. They left traces of their visit in the form of souvenirs, which have been found in various places in the Roman Empire. Among them are the bronze knife sheaths made by the craftsman Gemellianus, decorated with the name of the place.

The decline began during the imperial crisis of the 3rd century. The Alamanni repeatedly breached the Limes. Especially between 259 and 270, raids and pillaging became more frequent. Around 270, a fire destroyed a large part of Aquae Helveticae. The remaining population gradually abandoned the settlement in the 4th century and retreated to the area of the baths. The construction of a defensive wall along the edge of the Haselfeld slope and the repeated renovation of the baths can be traced back to this period. Coin finds prove that the springs were used until the 5th century and beyond.

=== Settlement development and change of rule ===
There is some evidence that a bathhouse existed in the early Middle Ages. The glory of the Roman era had long since faded and the buildings had fallen into disrepair, but it is believed that the late Roman baths continued to be used. During the Merovingian and Carolingian periods, the springs were part of the royal estate. Just under a kilometer to the south, at the narrow point between the Lägern and the Schlossberg, the later Old Town developed. The development of two settlement centers in the immediate vicinity can be traced back to the different legal claims of the king and the regional nobility. The place name Baden, first mentioned around 1030 for the younger settlement, is derived from the Latin Aquae. The thermal springs and baths were therefore important identifying features.

In the late 11th century, through territorialization, the baths came into the possession of the Lenzburg family. In 1173 they were replaced by the Kyburgs, who in turn were succeeded by the Habsburgs in 1273. During the reign of these noble families, the baths were significantly expanded and the springs, which had not been maintained since Roman times, were rebuilt. The settlement became one of the most important spas in Europe and began to resemble a small town. The construction of a wall and the Chapel of the Three Kings around 1100 also contributed to this. However, the wall served more as a boundary and offered little effective protection. Due to the number of springs, a distinction was made between the "Large Baths" on the left bank of the Limmat and the "Small Baths" on the right bank, first mentioned in 1347; the entire spa settlement was also called Niederbaden. A ferry crossed the river.

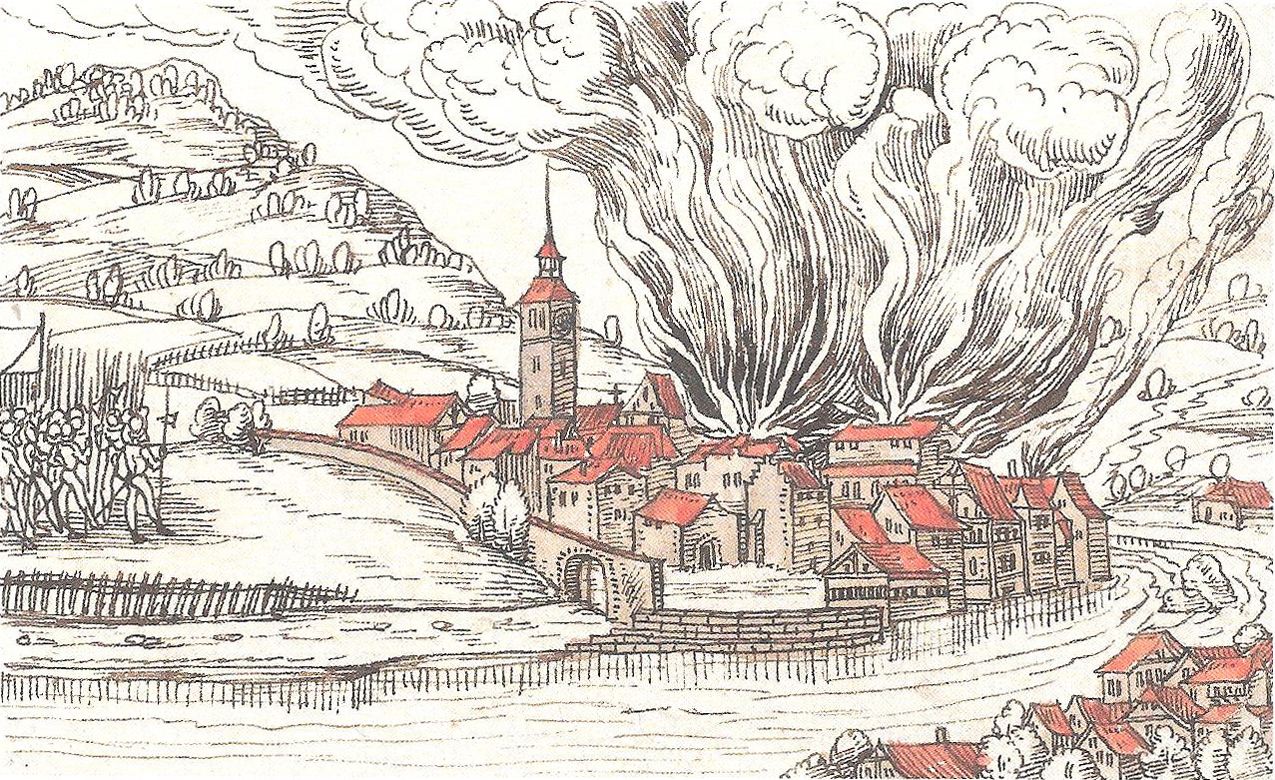
Fire at the baths in 1444; depiction in the chronicle by Christoph Silberysen

The development was repeatedly interrupted by warlike events. On several occasions, the Baths were the target of plundering and pillaging by passing armies. Troops from Zurich burned down the spa settlement on Christmas Eve 1351 after failing to capture the town. In December 1375, an attack by the Gugler also caused extensive damage. In July 1388, during the Sempach War, the people of Zurich and Schwyz again plundered the Baths. During the Old Zurich War, when Zurich allied itself with the Habsburgs against the other places in the Confederation, a mercenary force under the command of Hans von Rechberg attempted to take the city on October 22, 1444. The mercenaries were driven back, whereupon they looted and burned the largely unprotected spa settlement.

Even under Habsburg rule, Baden established itself as a place of arbitration. On the one hand, Stein Castle above the town was the seat of the Habsburg central archives, and on the other hand, the spa settlement offered sufficient accommodation, amenities, and amusements for visitors. Its importance as a meeting place increased significantly after the conquest of Aargau by the Swiss Confederates in April and May 1415. From 1416, the delegates of the eight old towns met in Baden at least once a year for the Tagsatzung. The most important business discussed there concerned the annual accounts of the common lordships, the jointly conquered and administered subject territories. Tagsatzungen took place in the town hall, while the baths often served as a meeting place for informal discussions.

=== Bathing culture and legal regulations ===
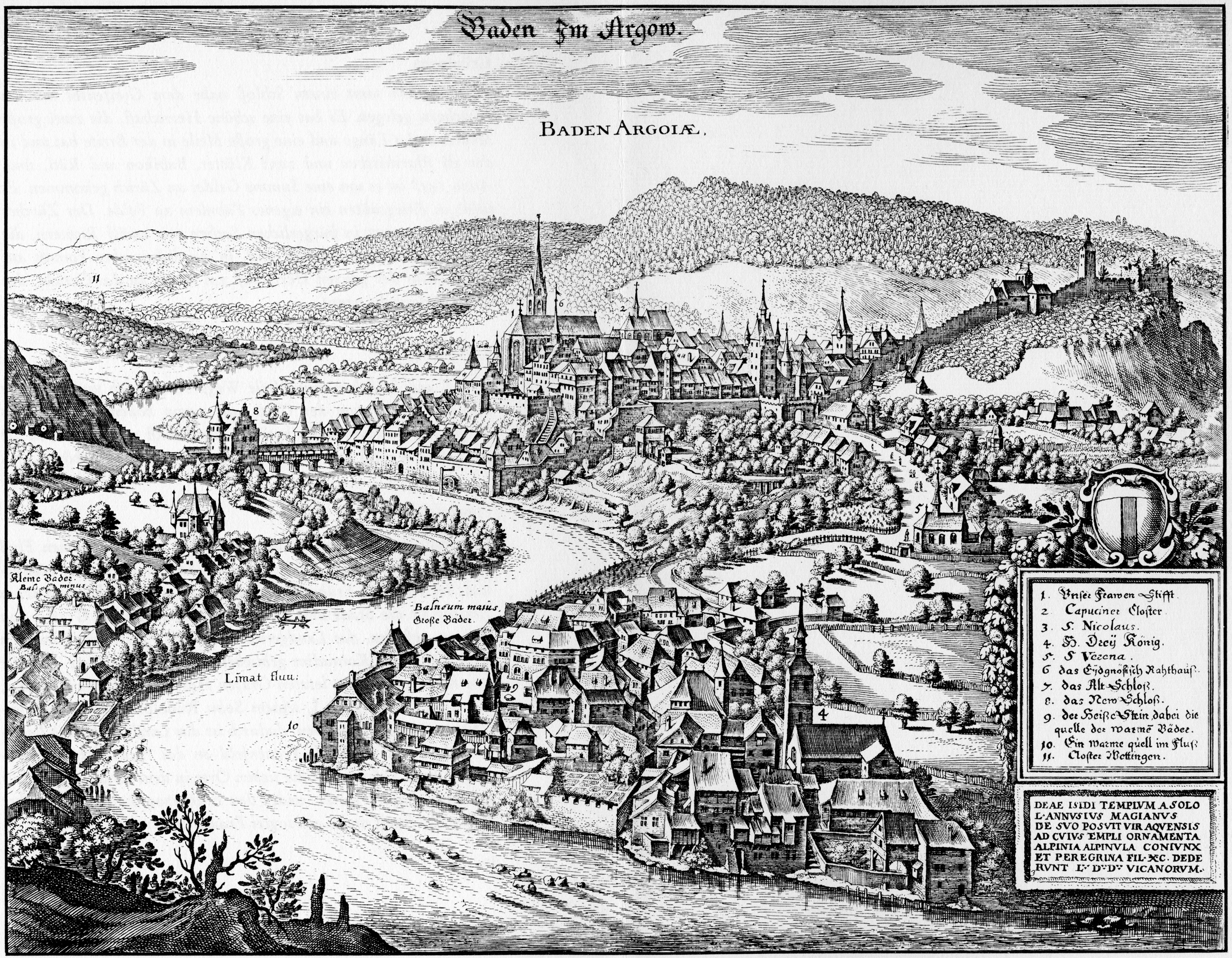
View of Baden in the Topographia Germaniae (1642), with the spa district in the foreground

A clear hierarchy of lodgings and baths developed according to the social status of the visitors. At the top of the hierarchy were two bathing inns built in the early 12th century: Schinderhof, first mentioned in 1293 (called Hinterhof from the early 16th century), and Hof nid dem Rain, first mentioned in 1361 (renamed Staadhof in 1467). These manor houses were mainly used by secular and ecclesiastical dignitaries and their entourage. One level below them were inns with their own springs (or a share in them), which were also allowed to offer private baths. The remaining inns were reserved for the lower classes and offered accommodation only. Their guests had to use the two public baths (Verenabad and Freibad). In all cases, guests had to bring their own bedding and food. Wealthy guests invited each other to banquets. From 1377, the "Zum Schlüssel" inn was the only one to have the privilege of entertaining walk-ins and guests from other houses. In the 16th century up to 700 guests could be accommodated at the same time.

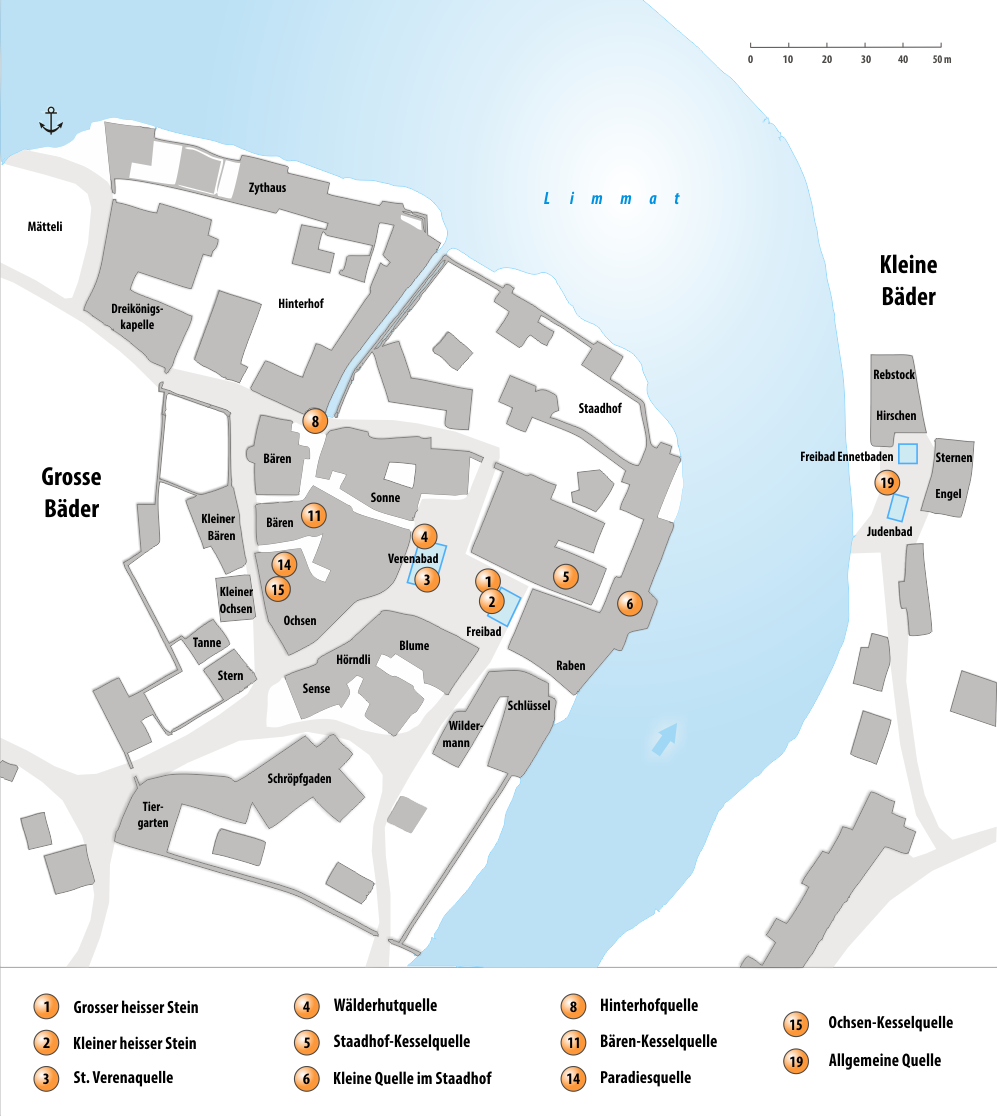
General map of the large and small baths (around 1650)

While the common people usually visited the spa to treat an ailment, the stays of high-ranking individuals had a distinctly representative character. The spa season, which lasted from Easter to September, provided a good opportunity for business and leisure in a relaxed atmosphere. Baden was considered a fashionable spa. Some women from wealthy families had the right to an annual "bathing trip" as part of their marriage contract. After the Reformation, this clause was particularly popular in Zurich, with its strict moral codes, since in Catholic Baden, splendid dresses and jewelry could still be displayed. From the 14th to the 18th century, it was customary for innkeepers, the city of Baden, and the Tagsatzung to give so-called "bathing gifts" to particularly high-ranking guests in order to cultivate relations. These included money, but also oxen and game for consumption. The principle that the lords granted all the rights related to the spas as a fiefdom was gradually loosened. Documents dating from 1376 and 1404 record for the first time the transfer of inns and springs to the free ownership of innkeepers, who were now allowed to dispose of the thermal waters themselves. This trend accelerated after the conquest of Aargau. The city of Baden, for example, took over the supervision of the public baths. However, the Hinterhof remained a federal fiefdom until the 18th century. Politically and legally, the bath settlement always belonged to Baden, but special rules applied here, enforced by bath servants. Guests were protected by their place of origin, and the bailiff of the county of Baden granted them free passage. They could not be prosecuted until they had left the bath. Gambling, dancing, and prostitution were permitted and subject to numerous regulations. Bathing courts adjudicated violations of hygienic, moral, and religious rules. Only high-ranking personalities benefited from this special jurisdiction.

Attitudes toward begging gradually changed. In the Middle Ages, giving alms to the needy was considered a Christian virtue. Wealthy people could also organize "baths for the soul", i.e. they paid for the accommodation and care of the bath and the bathers. In doing so, they hoped for salvation in the afterlife. Begging was forbidden from the 15th century. According to a decree of 1498, the bailiff was allowed to turn away beggars after two nights, and after two weeks if they had only come to bathe. Alms could be taken from them. Beginning in 1601, beggars and vagrants could be stopped and turned back at local customs posts. Innkeepers who repeatedly harbored undesirables were threatened with banishment beginning in 1640. The situation hardly improved, so in 1754 the bailiff Franz Ludwig von Graffenried established a fund for the poor at the baths, with which private donors provided material and medical care for needy bathers. As a result of this measure, the most obvious poverty in the baths gradually disappeared. With the appointment of the first official doctor for the poor at the baths in 1805, the care of the poor was institutionalized.

=== Temporary loss of importance ===
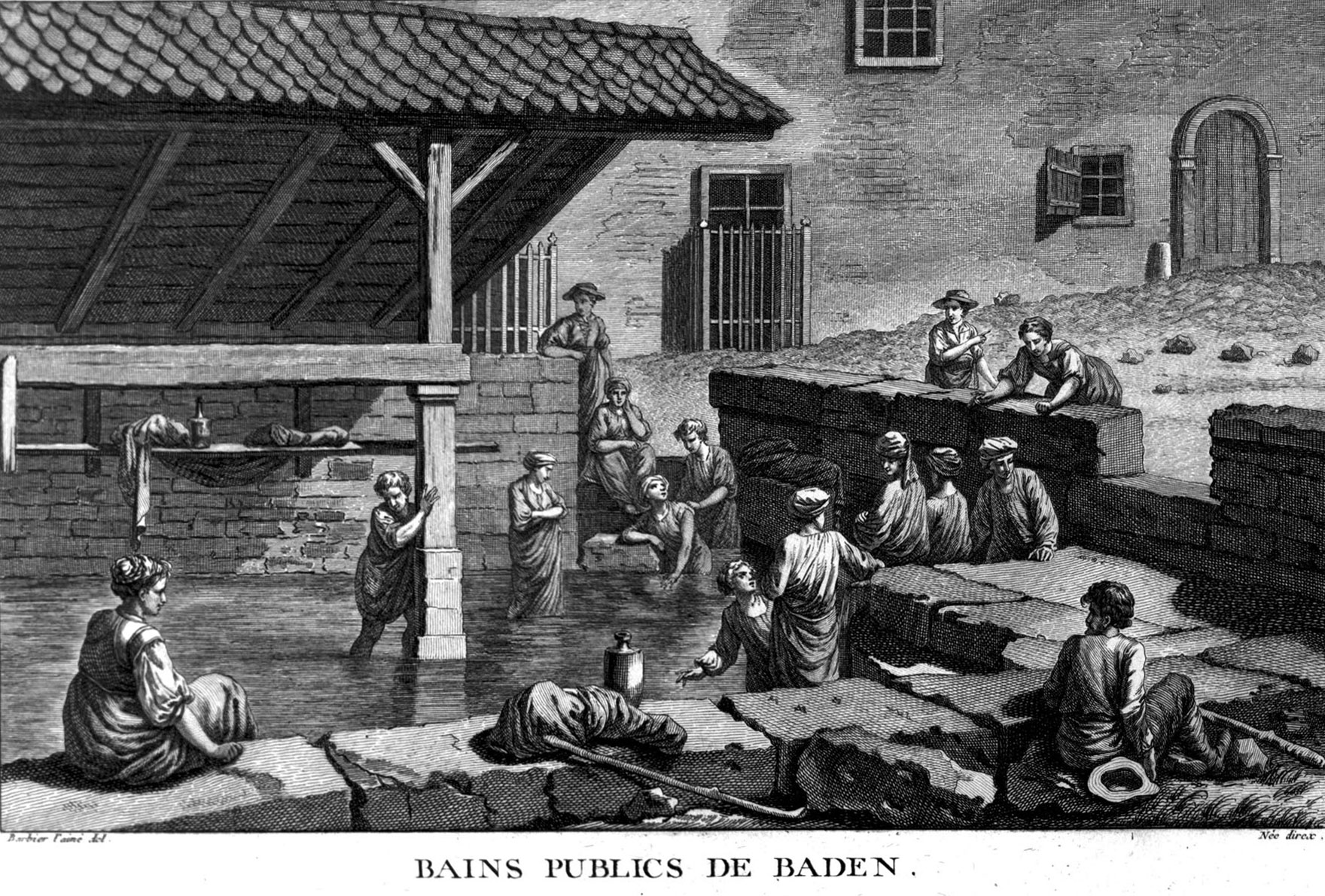
The open-air baths around 1780

Around 1500, Baden began to lose its appeal. This was due to epidemics such as the plague and syphilis, but also to changing moral standards. For example, the separation of the sexes, which had been in force since the 15th century but previously ignored, was enforced more strictly. Throughout the 16th and 17th centuries, Zurich repeatedly issued bathing bans. This was done to control real or perceived debauchery. In most cases, the authorities enforced the bans for only a short time. New medical findings cast doubt on the benefits of long-term cures. The affluent upper classes increasingly turned to drinking cures, which were less time-consuming and location-bound. The strong taste and high temperature of the water in Baden made it unsuitable for this purpose. Wide promenades, extensive parks, salons or large ballrooms, which were fashionable elsewhere, were lacking in Baden. In the Republican and Federalist Confederation, there were no aristocratic or royal patrons who could have ordered the extensive construction of new spa facilities.

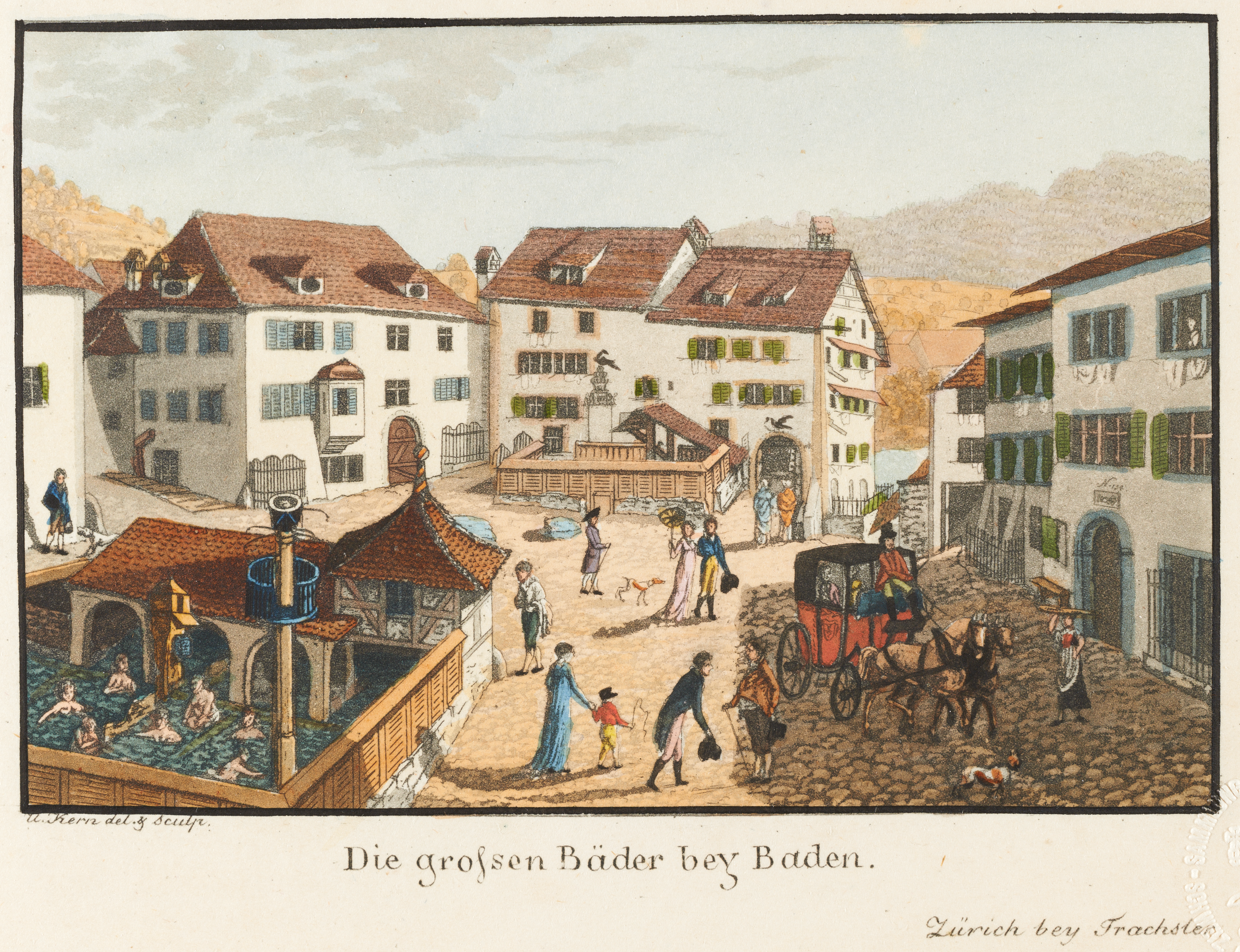
The Great Baths around 1800

During the Thirty Years' War, foreign guests were largely absent. Even afterwards, they remained a small minority. The wealthy guests now came mainly from the patrician classes of Swiss cities. After the cure, which they increasingly took in private rather than communal baths, they spent their leisure hours on the "Mätteli". This meadow was a meeting place for games, entertainment and socializing. The first theater in Switzerland was built in 1675. In the Toggenburg War of 1712, Bern and Zurich captured the town of Baden and subsequently excluded the Catholic towns in eastern Aargau from co-governance. After this, the defeated parties had no interest in continuing to meet here for the Tagsatzungen. As a result, the baths lost a wealthy and prestigious clientele.

In 1714, the peace negotiations at the end of the War of the Spanish Succession briefly brought the aristocracy back to Baden. However, the baths were unable to regain their former splendor, and decades of stagnation followed, during which the landlords made little investment. Less affected were the small baths, which had always attracted a rural and petty bourgeois clientele and remained a destination for ordinary people. Since 1644 there had been a bath reserved for Jews. The nadir was reached during the time of the Helvetic Republic: French occupying troops made permanent use of the accommodations and caused a huge loss of income. Between the spring of 1798 and the end of 1800, the Staadhof alone had to accommodate some 4,000 soldiers and suffered a financial loss of some 5,000 guilders. Between the First and Second Battles of Zurich in 1799, the front line between the French and Austrians ran along the Limmat; all traffic between the Large and Small Baths was interrupted.

=== The 19th century heyday ===
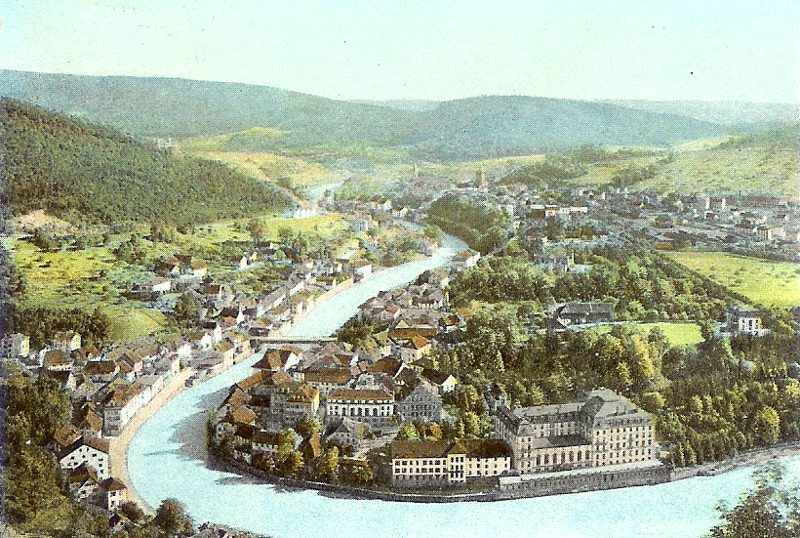
Postcard of Baden with the spa district (1904)

In 1803, the founding of the Canton of Aargau brought with it fundamentally new legal conditions, and the final overcoming of the partly medieval ownership structure created economic incentives for modernization and expansion. In 1811, the innkeeper of the Staadhof was the first to replace some of his buildings with modern structures. Other innkeepers followed his example from the 1820s. In 1818, a footbridge was built over the Limmat, the first river crossing at this location since Roman times. Carriages could easily reach the Great Baths on the Bäderstrasse, built in 1827/28. The same was true of the Badstrasse in Ennetbaden, built in the 1830s. In 1828/29, the canton tapped the Limmat spring, whose water was used to operate the baths for the poor, which opened in 1838. This made it possible to abandon the open-air baths: the open-air baths disappeared in 1839, followed a year later by the Verenabad (an open-air bath in Ennetbaden survived until 1865). In the 1830s and 1840s, several new hotels were built on both sides of the Limmat to meet modern demands. The Great Baths expanded beyond the (now demolished) medieval enclosure wall.

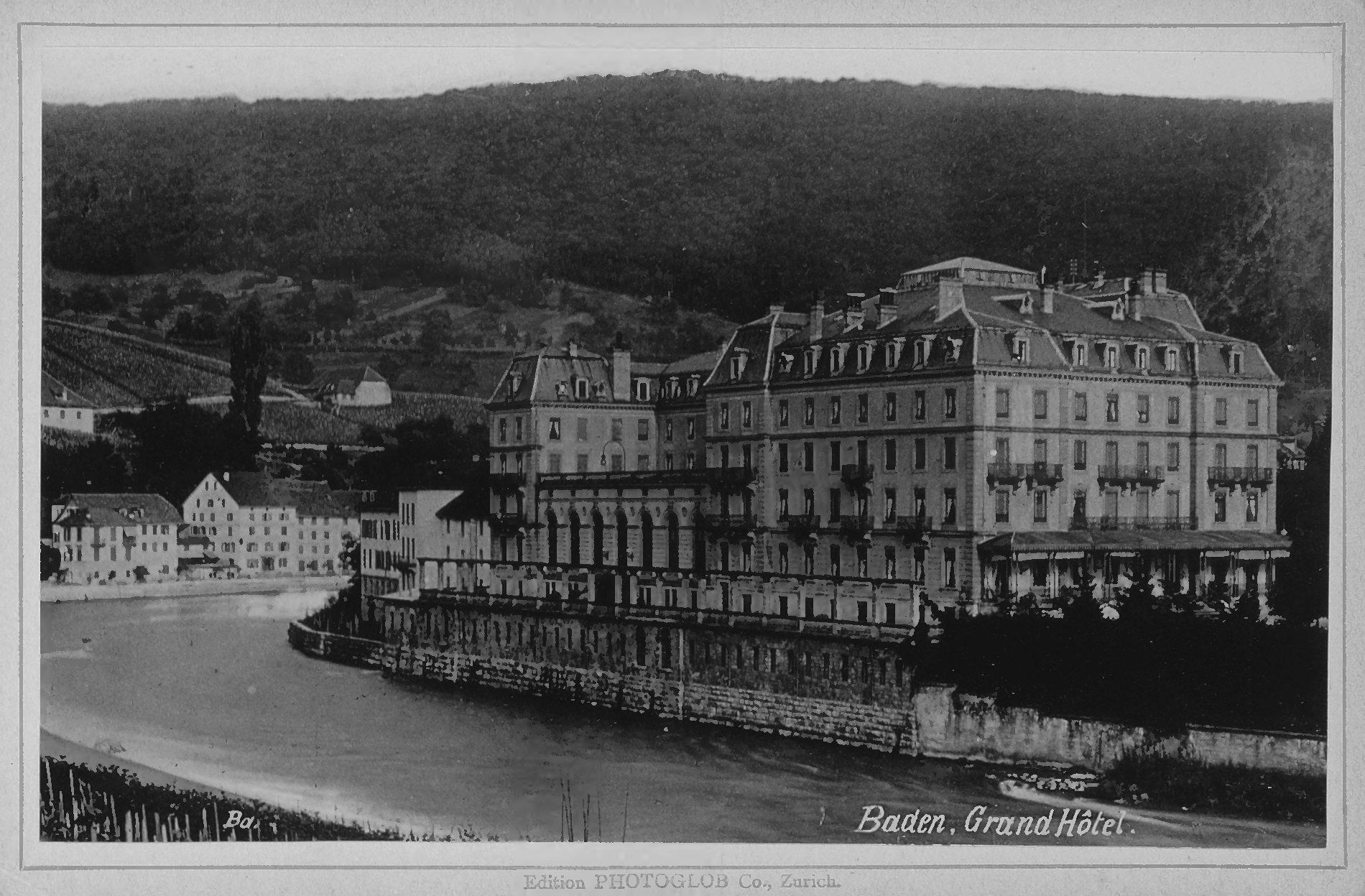
The Grand Hôtel around 1890

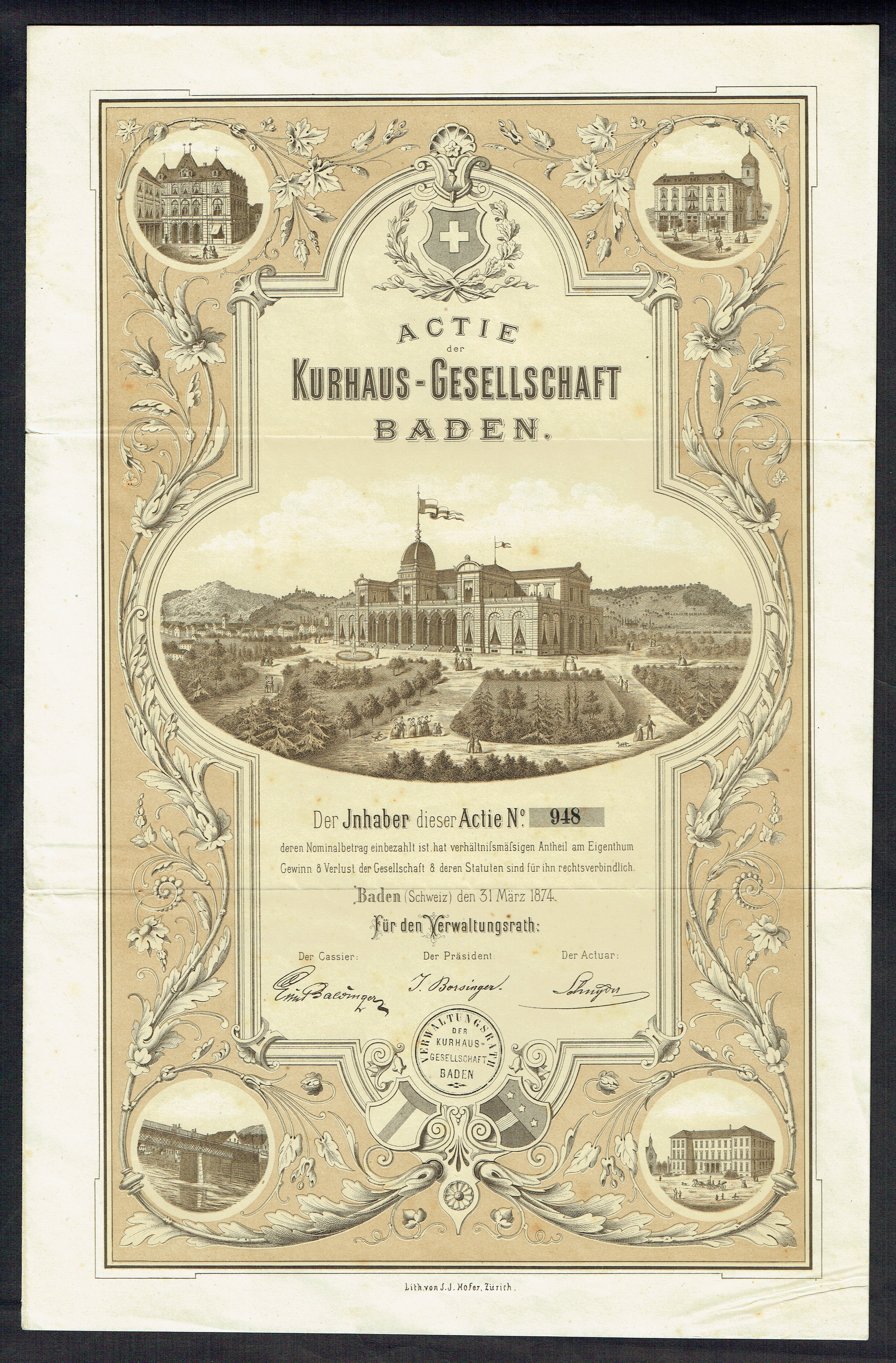
Share of the Kurhaus- Society (1874)

The drilling of the new Schwanenquelle spring in Ennetbaden in 1844 upset the balance of the delicate system. The other springs nearly dried up and could only be restored to their former state by the insertion of an orifice plate. The canton banned further private drilling, documented the springs and established binding regulations on flow rates, dam heights, outlet levels, ownership and usage rights. The investments and the commitment of innovative spa doctors began to pay off in the mid-19th century, when Baden became an internationally renowned spa. Guests came from the upper middle classes of Switzerland and various European countries. Promenades along the Limmat River, walks on the surrounding hills and viewing pavilions added to the tourist attractions. The opening of the Zurich-Baden railway line, the first in Switzerland, on August 7, 1847, led to a further increase in visitors; the Baden railway station was built halfway between the old town and the spa district. The Neue Kuranstalt AG, in which almost exclusively outside donors were involved, intended to promote and expand the spa on a grand scale. In 1872 it acquired the Hinterhof and a year later the Staadhof. It thus owned about a third of the spa district and a significant portion of the springs. In 1873/74 it removed the last medieval buildings from the Hinterhof. On the site, she had the "New Kuranstalt" built according to the plans of Paul Adolphe Tièche, with 176 rooms and 60 bathrooms. This luxury hotel, equipped with all the achievements of the time (in 1882 it was the first building in Baden to be permanently supplied with electricity), went bankrupt in 1885, despite the large number of visitors. The new owner changed the name to "Grand Hôtel" to emphasize its claim to be the first hotel on the square. Other hotels also underwent major expansion in the 1870s and 1880s.

Baden faced increasing competition from high-altitude spas and other tourist destinations in Switzerland and abroad. In particular, the lack of a large event hall as a social center and a spa park was seen as a disadvantage of the location. After the failure of a project by Gottfried Semper, the Kurhaus Society was founded in 1871 and launched an architectural competition. The Kursaal on the Haselfeld was opened in 1875 together with the park. Thanks to the transition to year-round spa operations, the number of overnight stays doubled from 78,000 to 149,000 between 1882 and 1913. By the end of the 19th century, the spa had become a mass phenomenon, but it also suffered a gradual loss of prestige. One reason for this was the transformation of Baden into an industrial city, especially after the establishment of Brown, Boveri & Cie (now ABB), whose production facilities were built near the spa from about 1891.

=== Decline in the 20th century ===
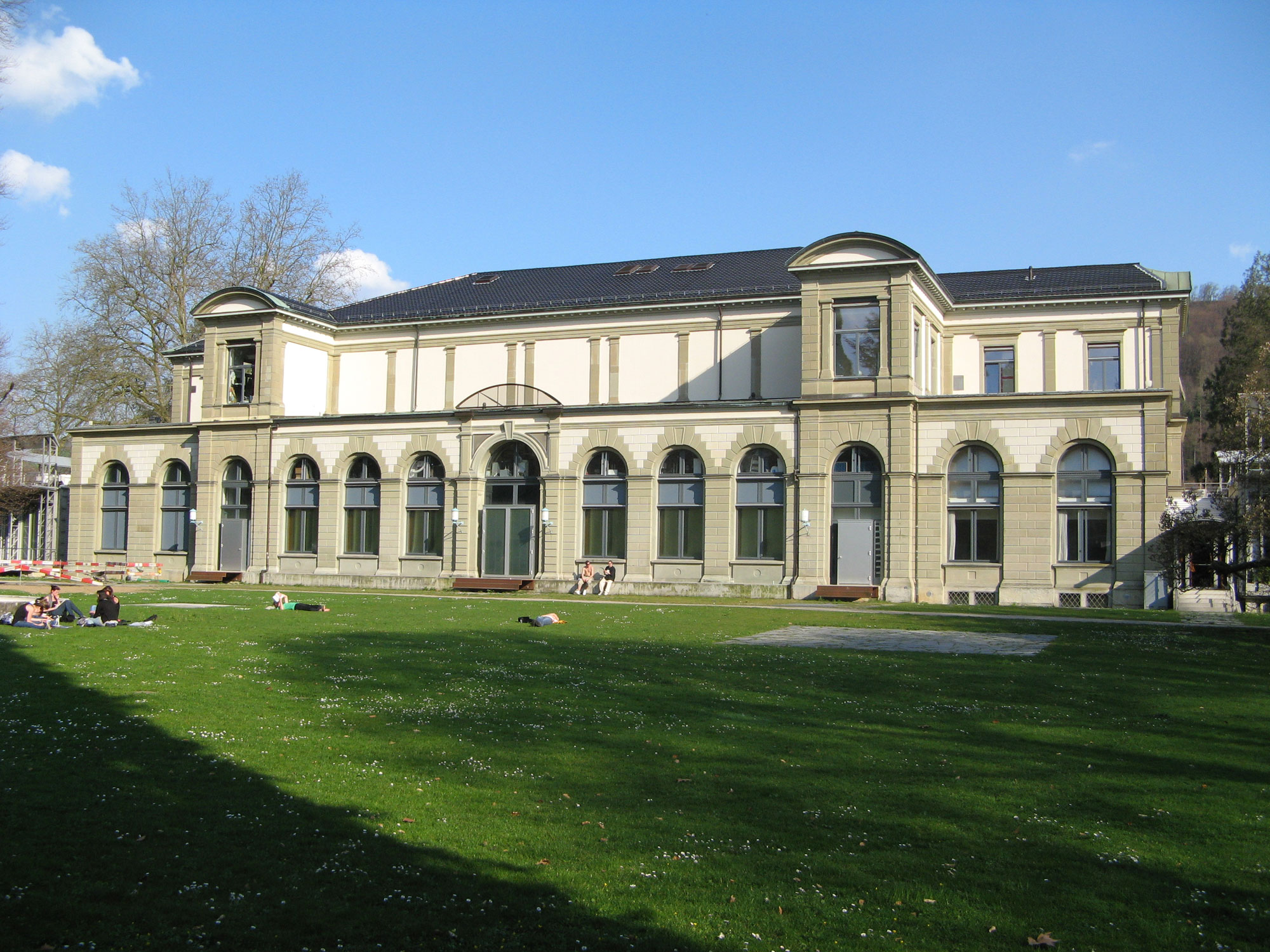
Kursaal

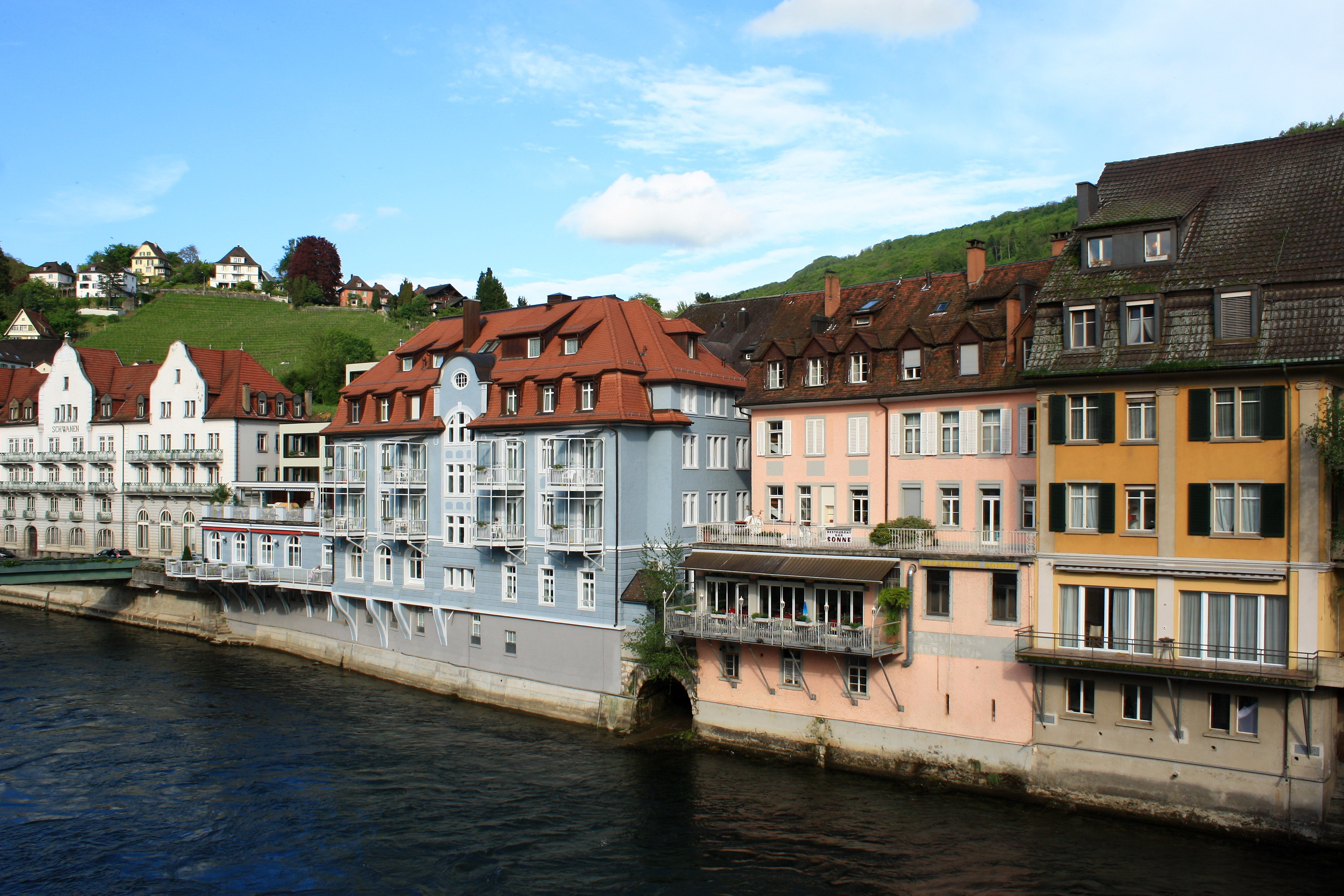
Former bathing hotels in Ennetbaden

During the First World War, the number of guests plummeted. The absence of foreign visitors was compensated by new domestic customers during the interwar period. This was due to social insurance schemes that paid for all or part of spa stays as a means of rehabilitation and regaining the ability to work. This new social cure for the lower and middle classes superseded the previously customary sophisticated social cure. The medical-therapeutic focus led to a loss of appeal for the traditional, wealthy spa clientele, who now largely stayed away from Baden. The Grand Hôtel, considered a relic of the lost and decadent Belle Époque, suffered particularly from the structural changes. First closed seasonally from September 1939, it was used as troop accommodation during the Second World War. In 1943, creditors demanded the liquidation of the operating company and the demolition of the unprofitable hotel. Finally, on August 18, 1944, the building was blown up by the Swiss Army, after having been used for several weeks as a training facility for various military units and for air-raid drills.

Ailments that previously could only be treated with baths and other therapies were increasingly being treated with surgery or medication. As a result, social insurance companies were only willing to pay for long stays at spas in exceptional cases; the focus was now on post-operative rehabilitation. After the Second World War, spas lost their appeal as holiday destinations; a stay at a spa was seen as the epitome of old age and illness. Baden tried to stop this decline by building a public thermal bath, especially since baths in hotels and clinics were no longer up to date. The first ideas were presented in 1938, and six years later Armin Meili published a study. In the mid-1950s, Verenahof AG, which had purchased the bankrupt estate of the Grand Hôtel, set about implementing the project. After the demolition of several outbuildings of the Staadhof and the rear courtyard, construction began in 1960. The indoor thermal pool, designed by Otto Glaus and opened on October 1, 1964, was the largest in Switzerland at the time, and an outdoor pool was added in 1980. From 1967 to 1969, Glaus also built the new Staadhof building, including the pavilion-like drinking hall.

Despite these investments, the number of guests soon began to decline. The local hotel industry focused on business travelers, for whom the spa was not the main reason for their trip, but at best a pleasant addition. Baden and Ennetbaden missed the wellness trend and fell far behind their Aargau competitors Bad Zurzach, Rheinfelden and Schinznach-Bad, which had managed to shed their old-fashioned image in time. In addition, Ennetbaden was hit hard by through traffic from the 1960s onwards. The hotels there were gradually converted or demolished, and the spa business came to a standstill around 1980. The wave of closures then spread to Baden. In 1994/95, there was renewed hope when the Israeli investor group Control Centers Ltd. presented the CHF 150 million "Riverfront" project, a multifunctional bathing, residential and entertainment complex. After doubts arose about the feasibility of the project and the investors withdrew early, the project was abandoned. The Hotel Verenahof, the largest hotel after the demolition of the Grand Hôtel, closed in 2002, while only the medical center remained in the Staadhof. The only spa hotel to survive was the Hotel Blume.

=== Revitalization project ===
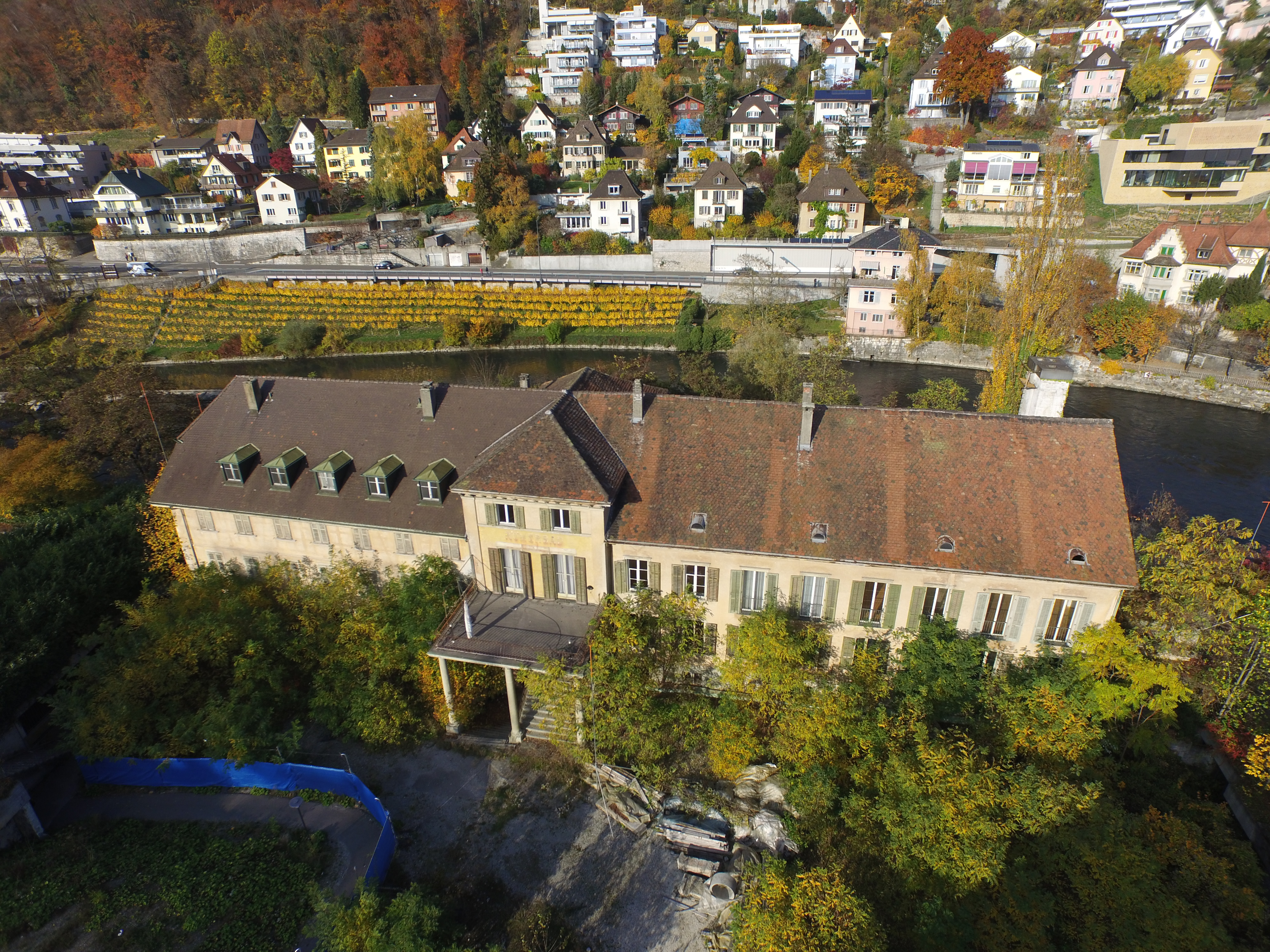
The Hotel Römerbad, demolished in 2017

In 2002, Baden, Ennetbaden and Obersiggenthal published a development model that served as the basis for the revitalization of the bathing quarter, which was in need of renovation. By changing the planning regulations, a new use structure was to be created that was not solely dependent on the spa and hotel business and that would allow for sustainable development. The first step was the construction of the Ennetbaden bypass to relieve the core and spa area of through traffic (up to 10,000 vehicles per day). The centerpiece is the 647-meter-long Goldwand Tunnel. After 34 months of construction, the tunnel was opened on November 8, 2008, the same day the Schiefe bridge was closed to motorized traffic. This reopened the promenade along Badstrasse and set in motion a major renovation and modernization program.

Starting in 1996, Verenahof AG pursued the goal of demolishing the Bären, Ochsen and Verenahof hotels and replacing them with a new thermal spa. The project met with strong opposition and finally failed in 2005. A year later, a local real estate investor took over the majority of the shares and initiated new plans based on a feasibility study by Max Dudler. Together with the city of Baden, he commissioned a study from five renowned architectural firms. In August 2009, Mario Botta's project was selected. The plan calls for a new spa on the banks of the river, consisting of a 160-meter-long building with a natural stone façade, from which finger-like openings protrude into the sky. Several indoor and outdoor pools with different temperatures, a sauna area, therapy rooms and a restaurant are planned. The 1960s Hotel Staadhof will be replaced by a residential and medical building. The listed hotels Bären, Ochsen and Verenahof will be connected internally and converted into a rehabilitation clinic with 78 rooms. In addition, the public space will be upgraded and a new pedestrian bridge to the former Oederlin factory site in Obersiggenthal will be built.

The thermal baths, built in 1963/64, were closed at the end of June 2012 as they are located on the site of the new thermal baths. Work on the CHF 160 million project was originally due to begin in 2013, but the necessary building permits were not issued until 2016 due to objections and further delays. Implementation of the project began on January 17, 2017 with the demolition of the dilapidated Hotel Römerbad (former branch of the Grand Hôtel) and the indoor thermal baths. Various adjustments to the Verenahof project subsequently delayed the start of construction by more than a year. The ground-breaking ceremony for the Botta-Therme finally took place on April 17, 2018, with the opening scheduled for November 21, 2021 under the name Fortyseven (derived from the temperature of the water).

== Research history ==
=== Balneology and geology ===
From the end of the 15th century, travel reports about Baden no longer contained only descriptions of impressions and events, but also began to deal with the thermal waters. In 1480, Hans Folz wrote the oldest known balneological report in German, describing the observations he had made here. In 1489, Heinrich Gundelfingen wrote a report on the medicinal effects of the thermal water and gave advice on successful cures. In 1516, Alexander Seitz published the first printed work about Baden. He described in detail the "power, virtue and genius" of Baden's springs. Around 1550, Conrad Gessner described in detail the bathing and drinking cures and their influence on the human organism. Like Seitz before him, he considered drinking cures to be far more beneficial. In 1702, Salomon Hottinger summarized the knowledge of the time in Thermae Argovia Badenses. He argued against prolonged communal baths and recommended individual baths of limited duration, which were better suited to the patient's constitution and illness.

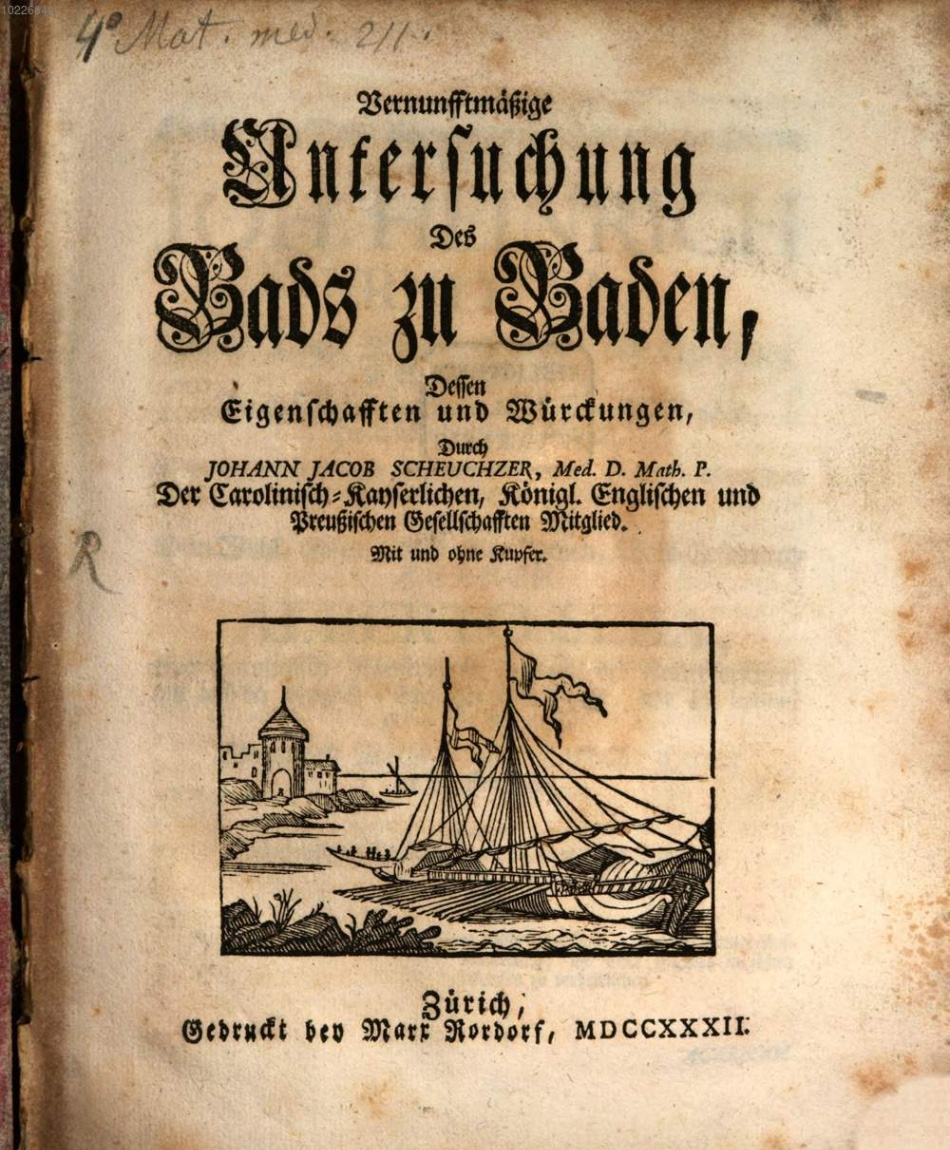
Reasonable examination of the baths at Baden by Johann Jakob Scheuchzer (1732)

In 1732, Johann Jakob Scheuchzer, in his Natural Investigation of the Baths of Baden, described the origin of the springs, their mineral content, and their hygienic effects. He also described the course of a cure and the use of barbers and cups. In 1792, the Reformed pastor Samuel Rengger wrote several reports on the spa system for the authorities in Zurich, criticizing in particular the lack of medical care for the sick and the precarious state of the local pharmacies. In 1824, Alexandre Vinet gave a positive assessment of the effects of the baths and considered the recent introduction of steam baths to be a valuable innovation. In 1845, the spa physician Johann Alois Minnich published "Baden and its warm springs in medical, natural and topographical terms", a work of great importance for the history of medicine and culture. His detailed descriptions of disease patterns and spa successes became an important foundation for spa medicine and contributed to the view of spa as a holistic healing method. There were many hypotheses about the origin of the thermal water. Hottinger and Scheuchzer suggested the Lägern as the catchment area. In 1817, Johann Gottfried Ebel described a gypsum deposit near Ehrendingen on the northern slope of Lägern as the source of the mineralization. Heinrich Zschokke, on the other hand, speculated in 1816 that the thermal water was the result of volcanic activity in the Glarus Alps, which were connected to the Lägern by layers of rock (magmatic water). In 1884, Albert Heim argued that rainwater seeped into the Uri Alps around Engelberg and flowed through layers of shell limestone to Baden. Albert Mousson, on the other hand, was already of the opinion in 1840 that the water came from the west, from the Jura. In 1902, Friedrich Mühlberg supported this theory with extensive geological studies, but even he was unable to determine the cause of the warming of the water. In 1943, Adolf Hartmann tried to prove that the water seeped into the Müseren plateau in the west of Baden, sank eastwards in the direction of the strata, collected under the Lägern and rose upwards. He explained the warming with the volcanic rocks of the Hegau, which extend far to the southwest. Paul Haberbosch took up this theory two years later and said that the amount of water from the Müseren plateau alone was not sufficient, so he also assumed the involvement of a groundwater flow from the Reuss.

During his studies at the Swiss Federal Institute of Technology in Zurich, Ulrich Münzel, a pharmacist and local historian from Baden, wrote a dissertation on the geology, hydrology and mineralogy of the thermal waters of Baden and their balneological applications. The dissertation, published as a monograph in 1947, combines scientific research with the interpretation of cultural-historical sources and is still considered a standard work. Later studies largely confirmed Münzel's findings, with the exception of geology. In the 1960s, isotope studies led to the realization that supra-regional flow systems existed, allowing several possibilities for the origin of the water. The Alpine origin was clearly refuted.

=== Archaeology ===
In 1451 or 1452, Felix Hemmerlin described the baths in detail in his Tractatus de balneis naturalibus. He reported on the restoration of the Great Hot Stone, which had been carried out in 1420. Workers uncovered ancient masonry and found Roman coins made of gold, silver, copper and brass, as well as an idol carved in alabaster, supposedly depicting the Emperor Augustus. In 1564, near the rear courtyard, a dedicatory inscription to "deus invictus" was found, which has since been lost. During the construction works, objects, mainly coins, were discovered. Seven bronze statues found in 1871 on the site of the Hotel Blume barn are particularly well preserved. They depict Roman gods and were probably part of a lararia. Between 1893 and 1898, the notary Alfred Meyer and his father-in-law Armin Kellersberger (the former mayor of the city) excavated on Parkstrasse, west of the spring area, and discovered a complex of buildings. Due to the large number of medical devices found, archaeologists assumed for decades that it was a Roman military hospital. After a re-evaluation of the excavation reports and finds in the late 1980s, this theory is no longer supported, as the finds date back several centuries.

An apse was discovered in 1963 during excavations for the indoor baths, but no further research was carried out. In 1967/68, the first systematic excavation in the spa district was carried out during the construction of the new Staadhof. Unexpectedly, it was discovered that the foundations of the early 19th-century bathing hotel were partially resting directly on Roman walls. Two marble-clad baths (5 × 11 m and 7 × 15 m) and four small baths between them were uncovered. The water was carried from one of the springs to the apse through a 50 m-long (160 ft) pipe. The apse was preserved and integrated into the basement of the new building. The spring shaft of the Great Hot Stone also had to be repaired in 1967. Two bronze bowls, two broken handles with consecration inscriptions, two silver denarii and about 300 copper coins were found in the deposits.

For a long time, little was known about the Roman settlement of Ennetbaden. This changed when the Archaeology Department of the Canton of Aargau carried out excavations in the area of the former Roman bridge in 2006 and from 2008 to 2010. They were able to prove the existence of a Roman craftsmen's settlement, which burned down in the last third of the 1st century. A terraced house built on the site also burned down around 270. Nearby, an Alemannic grave from the second half of the 7th century was discovered, containing a woman dressed in traditional costume and adorned with jewels. The area of St. Michael's Chapel, which was demolished in 1966, was also investigated and a cemetery was found. The 60 or so graves, dating from 1669 to 1807, contained both locals and bathers.

After the announcement of the major Botta project, the cantonal archaeology department carried out extensive excavations. Starting in April 2009, up to 40 people were involved in three excavation sites, making this the largest investigation ever carried out in the Canton of Aargau outside of Vindonissa. It lasted until June 2012 and yielded numerous new findings, especially about the urban development in the High Middle Ages. For example, the area below the Verenahof was drained in the 11th century in order to tap new springs and build new baths and inns. A bathhouse from the 13th or early 14th century was also discovered under the Hotel Ochsen. The "Kesselbad" from around 1500, which belonged to the rear courtyard, was integrated into the new baths.

== Prominent spa guests ==
Baden was often visited by famous people who hoped to find relief from their ailments, meet like-minded people, or combine business with pleasure. In the late 13th and early 14th centuries, representatives of the Habsburg dynasty often stayed here and conducted official business in Baden. Several visits to the spa by King Rudolf I between 1275 and 1291 are documented, as are those of his son Albrecht I (until 1308) and his grandson Leopold I (until 1315). An Urbarium of the Abbey of Einsiedeln from 1330 contains the first records of visits by clerics. In 1345, a report by the chronicler Johannes of Winterthur mentions visits by various high-ranking people from Basel and Alsace. Visits by Emperors Charles IV (1354), Sigismund (1433/34), and Frederick III (1442), as well as Pope Martin V (1418), are also recorded. In the Berner Schilling, Diebold Schilling the Elder gives a detailed account of the visit of Queen Eleanor of Scotland in the fall of 1474. She was held in high esteem for her efforts to secure the Perpetual Accord, the peace treaty between the Swiss Confederation and Austria.

Before the Reformation, dignitaries raised all sorts of money to finance trips to Baden, in keeping with their status. In 1415, for example, Anastasia von Hohenklingen, Abbess of the Fraumünster, sold a farm near Zurich in order to use the proceeds to travel to Baden. In 1500, the Dominican nuns of the Töss Monastery paid the Pope a considerable sum for permission to visit the baths in secular clothing for health reasons. The mayors of Zurich were particularly profligate. In 1489, shortly before his arrest and execution, the otherwise immoral Hans Waldmann stayed here in the company of several ladies and enjoyed himself. Diethelm Röist, one of his successors, was accompanied by no fewer than 189 people in 1534. In 1570 the Duchess of Württemberg stayed in Baden. She had taken her Reformed court preacher with her in violation of the Second Peace of Kappel in 1531. As a result, she was fined 200 florins by the Catholic towns of the Confederation. Other high-ranking visitors included the Electors Joachim Frederick of Brandenburg (1587) and Ernest of Bavaria (1607).

It was not until the end of the Coalition Wars that Baden once again attracted prominent figures. Although the publication of detailed guest lists did not become fashionable until around 1830, the revolutionary Frédéric-César de La Harpe, the publicist Paul Usteri, and the influential politician Philipp Albert Stapfer are known to have visited in 1813. In 1834, the future French Emperor Napoleon III was a guest. In the 1840s, many German dissidents stayed at the Little Baths, including Adolf Ludwig Follen, Georg Herwegh, Ferdinand Freiligrath, and Charles Sealsfield. After the opening of the railroad and especially after the opening of the Grand Hôtel, an increasing number of aristocrats from Germany, France and Russia stayed here, as well as well-known representatives of business, science and culture. These include the former French empress Eugénie de Montijo (several times in the 1870s and 1880s), the Federal Councillors Emil Welti (1878) and Bernhard Hammer (1890), the generals Hans Herzog (1888) and Edward Montagu-Stuart-Wortley (1902), the writers Alexandre Dumas (1854), Gottfried Keller (1886) and Conrad Ferdinand Meyer (1896), the painter Arnold Böcklin (1889), the physicians Rudolf Virchow (1883) and Albert Schweitzer (1906), the historian Jacob Burckhardt (1889), the physicists Marie and Pierre Curie (1898), the banker Alphonse de Rothschild (1890), the film pioneer Louis Lumière (1899), and the former French Prime Minister Charles de Freycinet (1915). The composer Richard Strauss stayed at the Verenahof several times, working on the opera Arabella. The last prominent world-class spa guest was the Ethiopian Emperor Haile Selassie, who spent a few days at Verenahof in 1954 after visiting the Brown-Boveri works.

== Cultural "bathing trips" ==
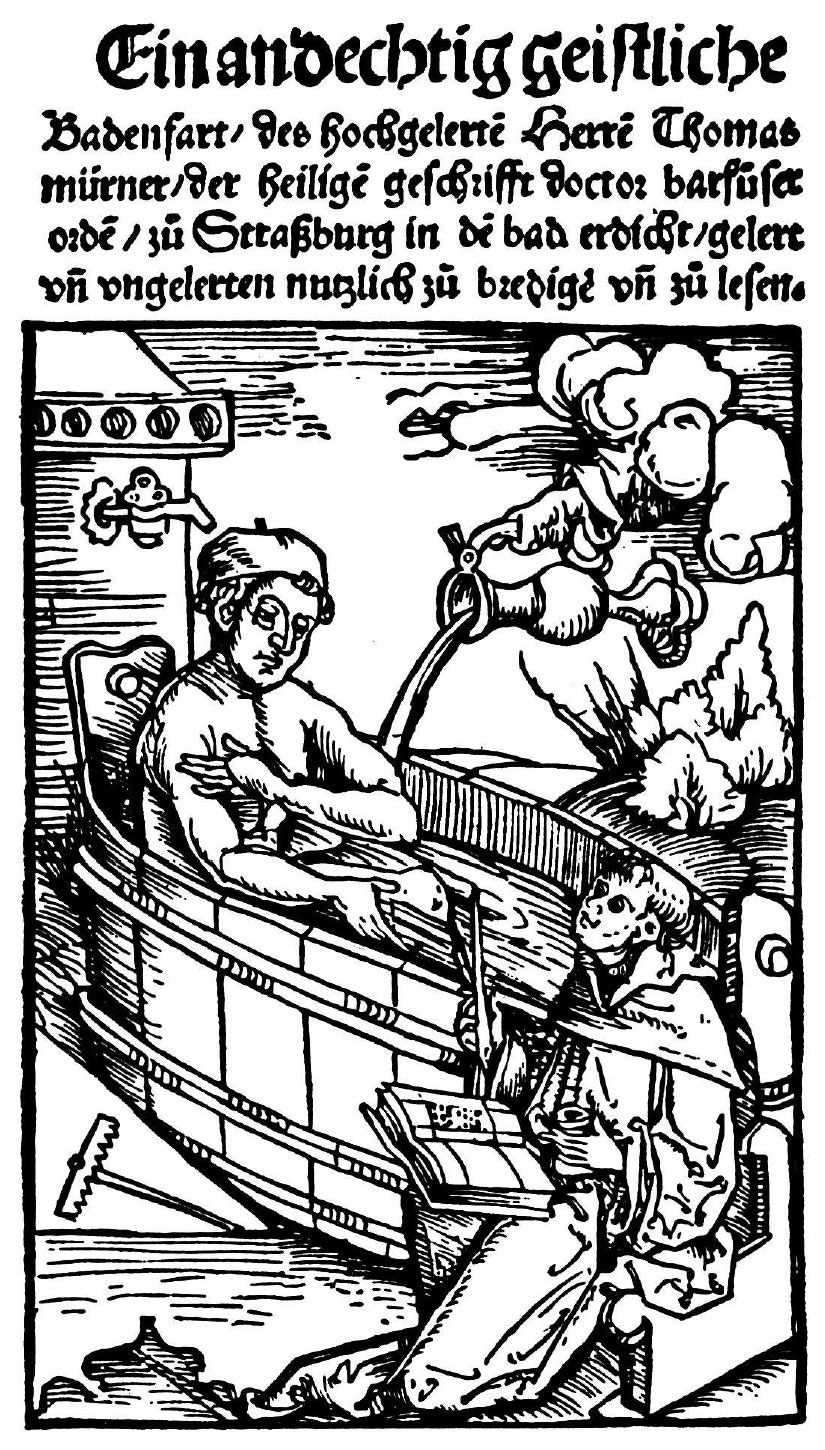
Thomas Murner: An ecclesiastical journey to Baden (1514)

There are numerous literary descriptions of the baths and the encounters with visitors. Poggio Bracciolini, one of the most important humanists of the Italian Renaissance, wrote one of the earliest descriptions of late medieval bathing culture north of the Alps. He stayed in Baden in May 1416 to treat rheumatism in his hands. In a letter to his friend Niccolò Niccoli in Florence, he described Baden as a locus amoenus, an idealized place of pleasure in the sense of the ancient poets and philosophers, but always with the ambivalence of the immoral. He was fascinated by the joie de vivre of the bathers.

"The bathrooms (...) are used by men and women together. Walls separate them, and there are many small windows in them through which they can drink and chat together, but also see and touch each other from one side to the other (...) Everyone is allowed to visit and stay in each other's baths to visit, chat, joke and relax their minds; this means that you can catch a glimpse of the scantily clad women coming out of the water or going into it."

— Poggio Braggiolini, Letter to Niccolò Niccoli

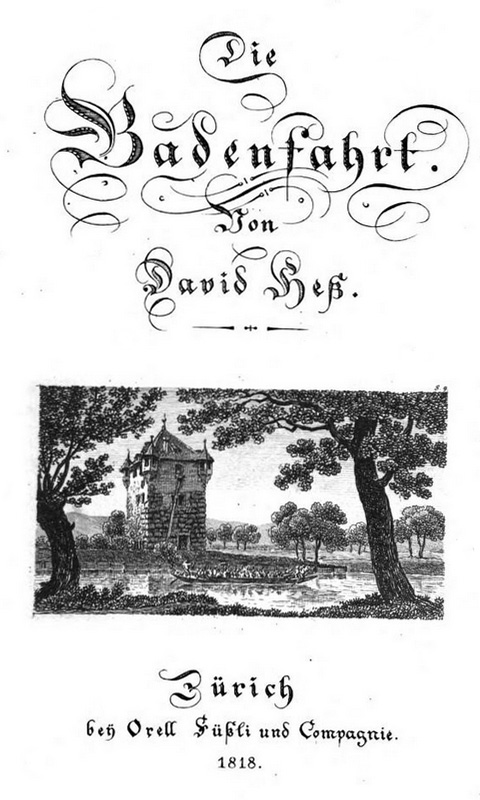
David Hess: The Baden journey (1818)

The topos created by Bracciolini had a decisive influence on the image of the Baden baths and was often taken up by later authors. However, the rather lascivious descriptions and interpretations only partially correspond to reality. In fact, many of the texts were intended to criticize what were considered decadent bathing pleasures and the moral transgressions of the nobility, the upper classes, and the clergy. Pero Tafur, a Castilian travel writer, visited the baths in 1438 to heal an arrow wound. He observed that men and women often entered the baths together, naked, drinking and singing. In 1471, the Saxon traveler Hans von Waltheim reported invitations from noblemen from Breisgau and Swabia, as well as citizens from Basel, Constance, and Lindau.

In 1514, the Alsatian Thomas Murner coined the term "bathing journey". In his work "A purely spiritual bathing journey", inspired by his own cures, he described a symbolic bathing cure in which Jesus is depicted as the bath attendant, Murner as the patient, and the bath as an allegory of repentance. In 1526, Niklaus Manuel of Bern ridiculed Johannes Eck and Johann Faber in Fabers und Eggen Badenfahrt, suggesting that they were more interested in the baths during the Baden Disputation than in rolling back the Reformation. Heinrich Pantaleon, a professor at the University of Basel, was a frequent guest. In 1578, he published Warhafftige und fleißige Beschreibung der uralten Statt- und Graveschafft Baden sampt ihre heilsamen warm Wildbedern. He did not limit himself to the baths, but also described the old town and its sights. In the picaresque novel The Adventurous Simplicissimus by Hans Jakob Christoffel von Grimmelshausen, published in 1668, the Baden Baths are also mentioned. It states that many visitors came here for pleasure rather than illness:

"... we went to Baden to spend the winter there. There, I hired us a pleasant room and chamber, which are usually used, especially in summer, by the bathers, who are generally rich Swiss people who prefer to relax and splash about rather than bathe for the sake of some ailment."

— Hans Jakob Christoffel von Grimmelshausen, The adventurous Simplicissimus

Meliora von Muheim, a nun from Uri in the convent of Hermetschwil, composed a song called A new song, in Baden journeys sung cheerfully. It was printed in 1617 and tells in eleven verses of an illness sent by God and alleviated in Baden. A comprehensive literary appreciation of the spa was written by David Hess in 1818. Written in an entertaining style, the travel and spa report The Baden Journey also contains a treatise on the cultural history of Baden since the Middle Ages as well as scientific observations on thermal water and the spa. He was the first author to romanticize the natural beauty of Baden's surroundings, such as the Devil's Cellar. The book became a best-seller, not least because of the illustrations by the engraver Franz Hegi, and helped bring Baden back to prominence as a health resort. Hess wrote in the preface:

"After I had repeatedly been sent there by the doctor's power for great benefit to my health, and had removed with joyful conviction a former prejudice against the way of life customary in the baths of Baden, I found the otherwise avoided objects so rich in content on summary consideration that to describe them became not only an expiatory sacrifice, but also a source of pleasure for me."

— David Hess, The Baden journey

In 1819, the poet Friedrich von Matthisson stayed at the Staadhof for several weeks. There he noticed the poetic talent of the blind innkeeper's daughter Luise Egloff and encouraged her. With the help of music professor Johann Daniel Elster, she later wrote two compositions. In the summer of 1841, William Henry Fox Talbot visited Baden; a calotype of the spa has been preserved. In 1920, Ernst Eschmann created the singspiel The Baden journey, set to music by Hans Jelmoli, about a trip to the spa in Baden in a Weidling on the Limmat. Probably the best known work about Baden was written by Hermann Hesse, who stayed here every year from 1923 to 1952. In 1925 he published Spa guest, a collection of glosses. He wrote about his first health cure:

"Now that my days in Baden are coming to an end, I can see that it's very nice here in Baden. I think I could live here for months. In fact, I should, if only to make up for many of the things I've sinned against here, against myself, against common sense, against the spa, against my room and table neighbors."

— Hermann Hesse, Spa guest

Rosemarie Keller, who grew up there as the daughter of the landlady of the Rosenlaube Hotel, wrote about the bathing district from the inside. She recorded her impressions in the novel The Landlady, published in 1996. The term " bathing journey " lives on today in the folk festival of the same name, which takes place every five years.

== Bibliography ==
- Heinrich Pantaleon: Warhafftige und fleissige beschreibung der Uralten Statt und Graveschafft Baden, sampt jhrer heilsamen warmen Wildbedern so in der hochloblichen Eydgnoschafft inn dem Ergöw gelegen, Printed in Basel in 1578
- Michel de Montaigne: Journal du voyage de Michel de Montaigne en Italie par la Suisse & l'Allemagne en 1580 & 1581, Rome 1774
- Poggio Bracciolini, Gian Francesco: Die Bäder zu Baden in der Schweiz, without location, 1780
- Fabian Furter, Bruno Meier, Andrea Schaer, Ruth Wiederkehr: Stadtgeschichte Baden. here+now, Baden 2015, ISBN 978-3-03919-341-7.
- Otto Mittler: Geschichte der Stadt Baden. Volume 1: Von der frühesten Zeit bis um 1650. Publisher Sauerländer, Aarau 1962, p. 254–276.
- Otto Mittler: Geschichte der Stadt Baden. Volume 2: Von 1650 bis zur Gegenwart. Publisher Sauerländer, Aarau 1965, p. 113–121 and 307–323.
- Peter Hoegger: Die Kunstdenkmäler des Kantons Aargau. Volume VI, District Baden I. Birkhäuser Publisher, Basel 1976, ISBN 978-3-7643-0782-0.
- Florian Müller: Das vergessene Grand Hotel: Leben und Sterben des grössten Badener Hotels 1876–1944. here+now, Baden 2016, ISBN 978-3-03919-408-7.
- Thomas Bolt, Uli Münzel: Der Bäderbezirk von Baden und Ennetbaden. In: Schweizerische Kunstführer. Volume 399. Society for Art History in Switzerland, Bern 1986, ISBN 978-3-85782-399-2.
- Myriam Gessler: Die Bäder von Baden: Rechtliche Freiräume (1415–1714). Volume 20. Swiss Society for Economic and Social History, Bern 2005, doi:10.5169/SEALS-871920.
- Ulrich Münzel: Die Thermen von Baden: Eine balneologische Monographie. Dissertation printed by ETH, Zurich 1947, doi:

10.3929/ethz-a-000090919.

- Hans Rudolf Wiedemer: Die römischen Heilthermen von Baden – Aquae Helveticae. In: Badener Neujahrsblätter. Volume 44. Letterpress AG, Baden 1969 (e-periodica.ch).
- Ulrich Münzel: Baden im Spiegel seiner Gäste. In: Badener Neujahrsblätter. Volume 73. Baden-Publisher, Baden 1998 (e-periodica.ch).
