= Aquae Helveticae =

Archaeological site in Switzerland

Coordinates: 47.480448°N 8.31227°E

Aquae Helveticae was a vicus and mineral spa established in the 1st century AD near the Roman legion camp of Vindonissa. It is in and was the origin of the name of Baden in Switzerland. It is a Swiss heritage site of national significance.

== History ==
The hot springs, located at a bend in the Limmat river near the legion camp at Vindonissa, were discovered around 20 AD. The hot (47 °C [117 °F]), mineral rich water was prized by the Romans and a settlement quickly developed around the springs. By the middle of the 1st century a good sized settlement surrounded the mineral baths. In 69 AD, during the Year of the Four Emperors, the XXI Legion burned the wooden vicus or settlement to the ground. Aquae Helveticae was rebuilt in stone in the following years. When the legion abandoned Vindonissa in 101, the local economy shrank. However, by the second half of the 2nd century the settlement experienced another golden age. During this time, pottery and bronze from Aquae Helveticae were traded throughout the region. During the 3rd century a series of invasions by the Alemanni led to the settlement being abandoned. However, the baths continued to operate. In the 4th century a defensive wall was built around the baths and coins continued to be minted in Aquae Helveticae.

The mineral springs probably continued to be used in the Early Middle Ages though no written records remain. 7th century graveyards have been discovered at Kappelerhof and Ländli located west and south respectively of the baths, indicating that the area remained occupied. Some of the baths remained in operation from the 4th/5th century until the 9th century. According to archaeological evidence in the 11th century some of the Roman-era baths were repaired and returned to operation. By the 13th or 14th centuries the baths were rebuilt and reappear in the historical record. But by that time the Roman Aquae Helveticae was replaced with Germanic Baden.

== Site layout ==
The main road through the vicus was the army road leading to Vindonissa. This road was flanked with shops and residential buildings with large arcades or porticos providing shoppers with protection from the weather and heat. Behind the shops were living quarters and then courtyards with outbuildings and workshops. The center of the settlement had several villas. The ruins of three baths have been discovered, though others may have existed.

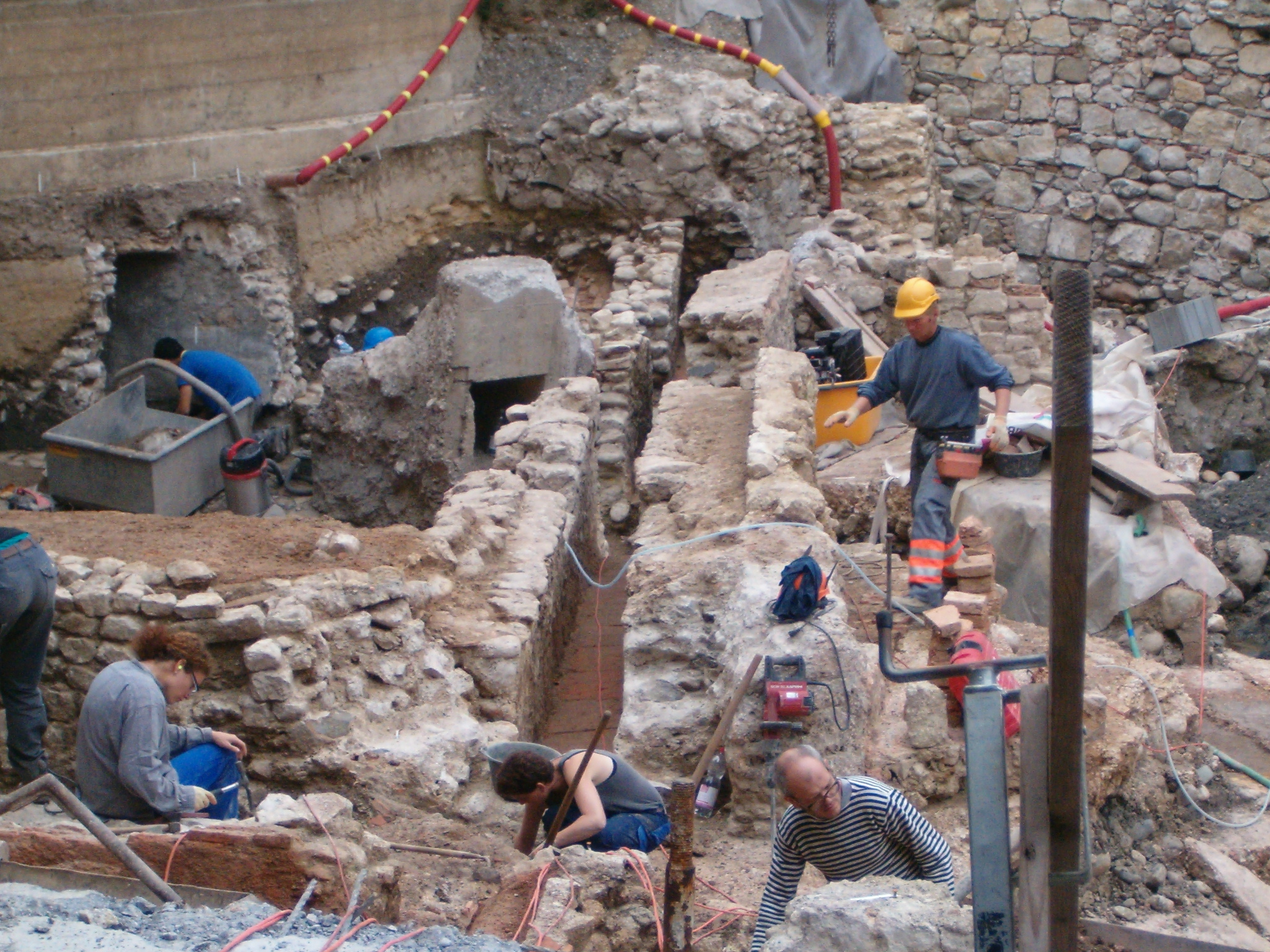
Excavation of Aquae Helveticae

== Excavation ==
Much of the settlement of Aquae Helveticae is located under the town of Baden, making exploration difficult. In 2018 during demolition of the Staadhof Hotel workers discovered 2000 year old wooden beams which supported the baths. Cantonal archaeology then excavated and discovered a large floor, a 4 m (13 ft) long wall and a drain that may have fed other pools. In 2020, a well-preserved Roman bath was discovered in Baden, dates back to 2,000 years ago.

== See also ==
- Colonia (Roman)
- Switzerland in the Roman era
