= Felix Hemmerlin =

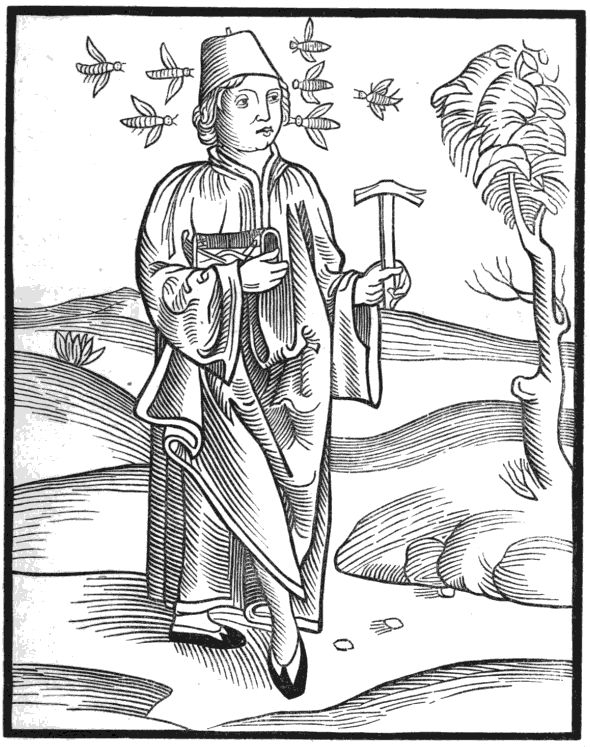
Felix Hemmerlin

Felix Hemmerlin (1388/9 – c. 1460), or Felix Malleolus in Latin, was a Swiss Roman Catholic cleric, author, church official and advocate of church reform.

Hemmerline held several church offices in Switzerland, including as chorister in Zofingen (1412–54) and in the Grossmünster Church in Zurich (1429-1454), as a provost at Solothurn (1421-1455), and as a contributor to the Council of Basel, identified with the Church reform party.

== Life ==
Educated at the school of the collegiate church of his native town of Zurich, Hemmerlin then entered the University of Erfurt. From there, in 1408 he went to the University of Bologna, where he studied law for four years.

In early 1412, Hemmerlich became a canon of the collegiate church of Saints Felix and Regula at Zurich. A little later a similar dignity was conferred upon him from the church of St. Mauritius, in Zofingen. In 1413 we find him once more at the University of Erfurt, where he took his Bachelor of Canon Law degree. He took part in the Council of Constance in 1418.

During the Old Zurich War between Zurich and the rest of the Swiss Confederation from 1436–1450, Hemmerlin composed several works attacking the Swiss as 'rustic peasants' who had rebelled against their rightful lords.

Hemmerlin's best known work is his De Nobilitate et Rusticitate Dialogus of the early 1440s, published in 1493. He writes of the discovery of inhabited islands "in the regions of the West". He records the work of the Franciscan friars whose mission on Gran Canaria was destroyed in the 1390s in the aftermath of pirate raids. Unlike other accounts that described the Canary Islanders' paganism as a justification for conquest, Hemmerlin presented the people as following natural law. They were therefore to be protected from the Portuguese and Castilians.

After Zurich's concessions and return to alliance with the other Swiss, Hemmerlin was imprisoned and deprived of his offices.
