= Limmat =

River in Switzerland

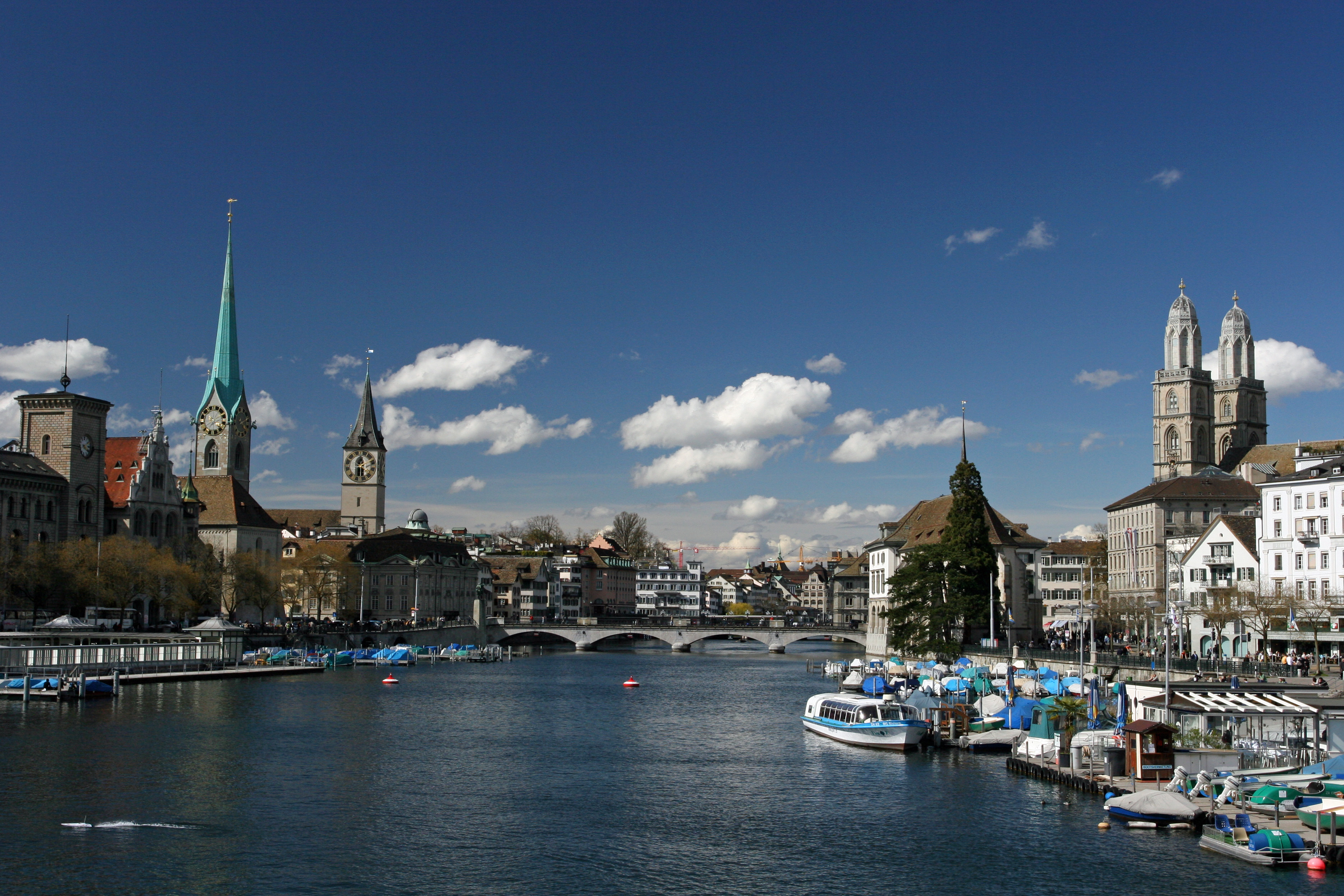
- The Limmat in Zurich, looking downstream to Rathausbrücke from Quaibrücke at Lake Zurich, Stadthausquai to the left and Limmatquai to right.

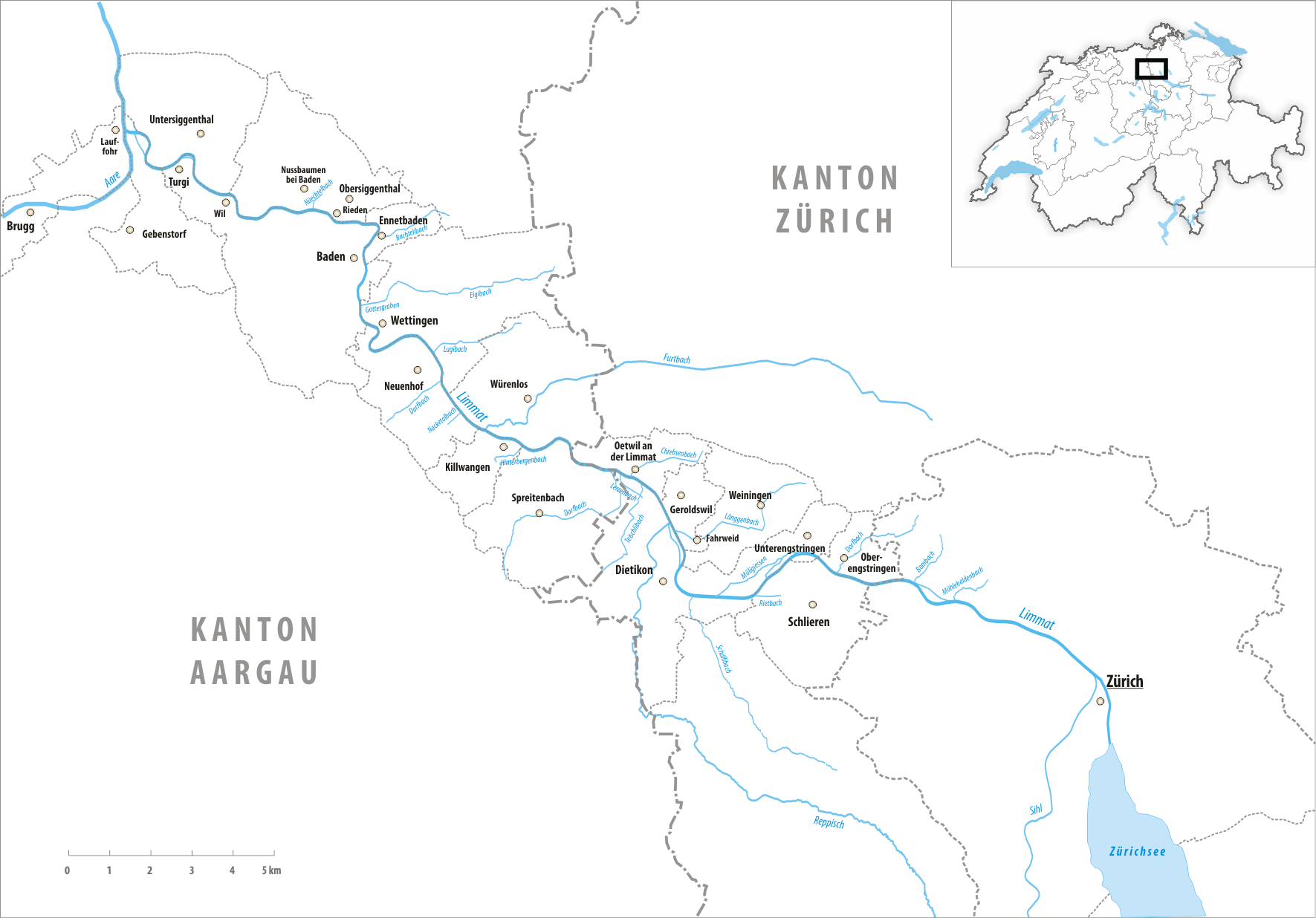

Location
- Country: Switzerland
- Cantons: Zurich, Aargau
- Settlements: Zurich (ZH), Schlieren (ZH), Dietikon (ZH), Oetwil a.d.L. (ZH), Wettingen (AG), Baden (AG), Ennetbaden (AG), Nussbaumen (AG), Turgi (AG), Untersiggenthal (AG)

Physical characteristics
- Source
  - location: Lake Zurich, Zurich
  - coordinates: 47.36677°N 8.54316°E
  - elevation: 406 m (1,332 ft)
- Mouth
  - location: Aare, Gebenstorf
  - coordinates: 47.5019°N 8.2375°E
  - elevation: 328 m (1,076 ft)
- Length: 36.3 kilometres (22.6 mi), 140 kilometres (87 mi) (Lake Zurich and Linth included)
- Basin size: 2,416 km^{2} (933 sq mi) (Lake Zurich and Linth included)
- Discharge
  - location: Baden
  - average: 101.0 m^{3}/s (3,570 cu ft/s) (MQ 1951-2013)
  - minimum: 69.2 m^{3}/s (2,440 cu ft/s) (MNQ 1951-2013), 24.6 m^{3}/s (870 cu ft/s) (NNQ, 2003)
  - maximum: 141 m^{3}/s (5,000 cu ft/s) (MHQ 1951-2013), 657 m^{3}/s (23,200 cu ft/s) (HHQ, 1999)

Basin features
- Progression: Aare→ Rhine→ North Sea
- Tributaries
  - left: Sihl, Schäflibach, Reppisch, Dorfbach Spreitenbach
  - right: Länggenbach, Furtbach, Lugibach, Gottesgraben
- Waterbodies: Lake Zurich, Stausee Wettingen

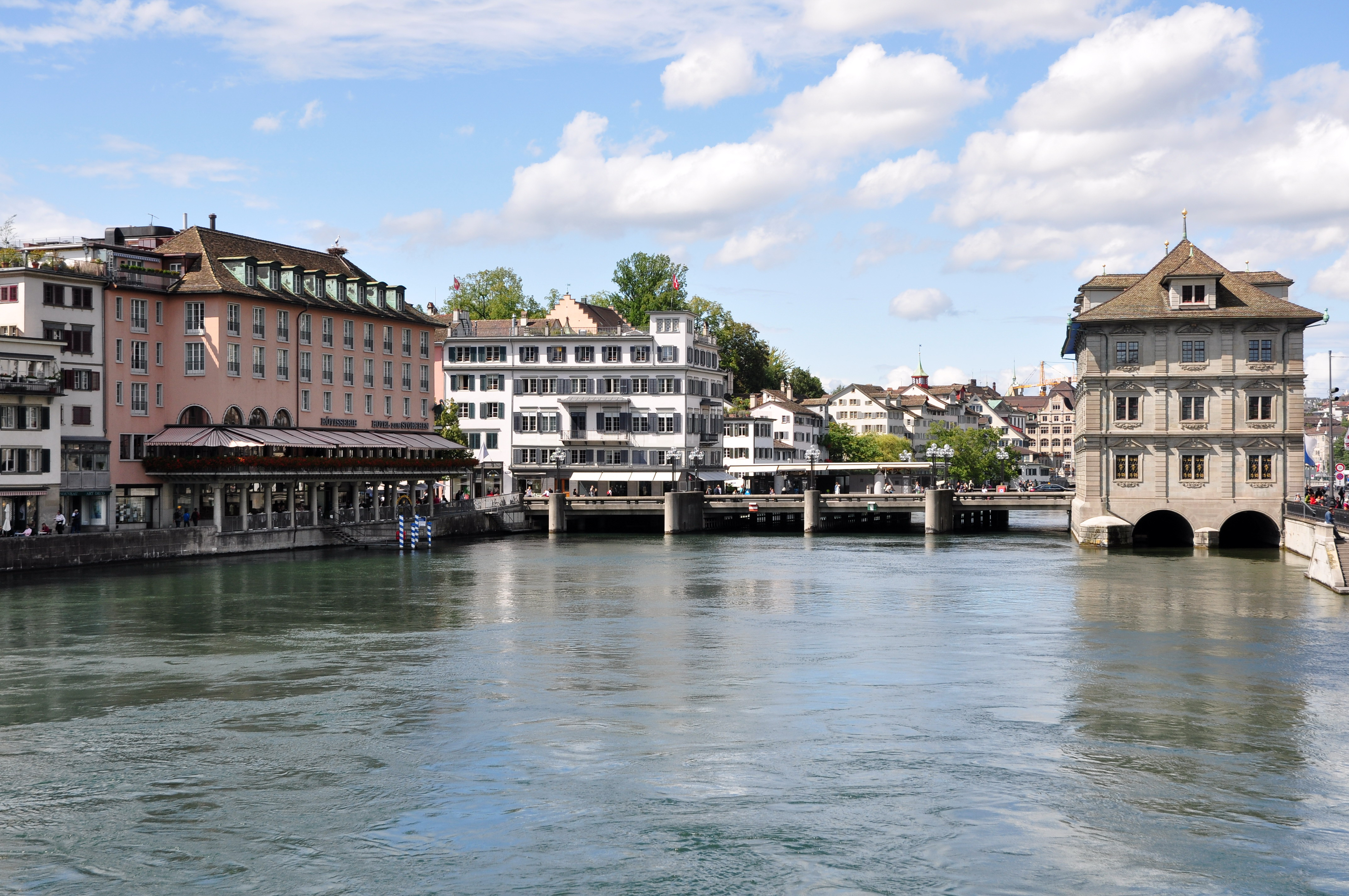
Rathausbrücke and Hotel zum Storchen at Weinplatz in Zurich

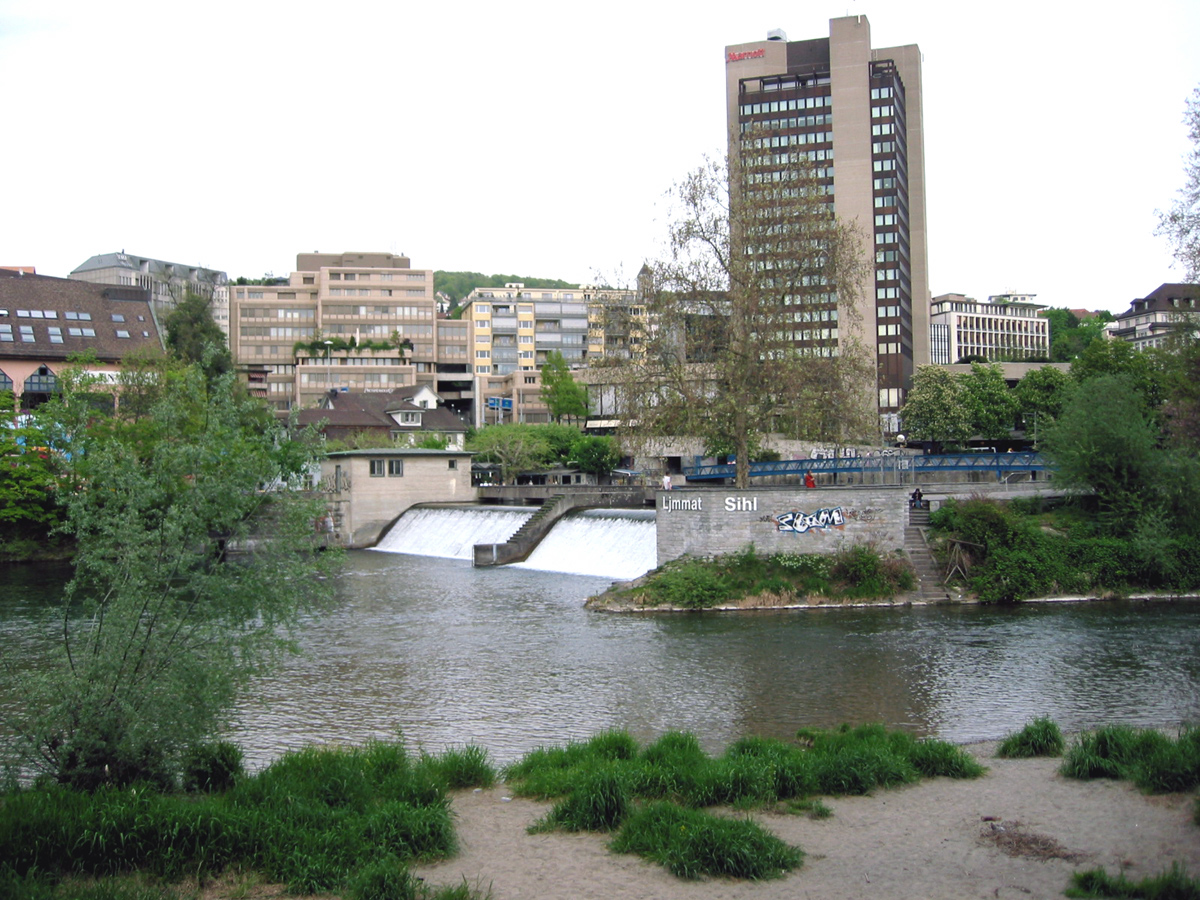
The confluence of the Limmat and Sihl, just downstream of Zurich city centre

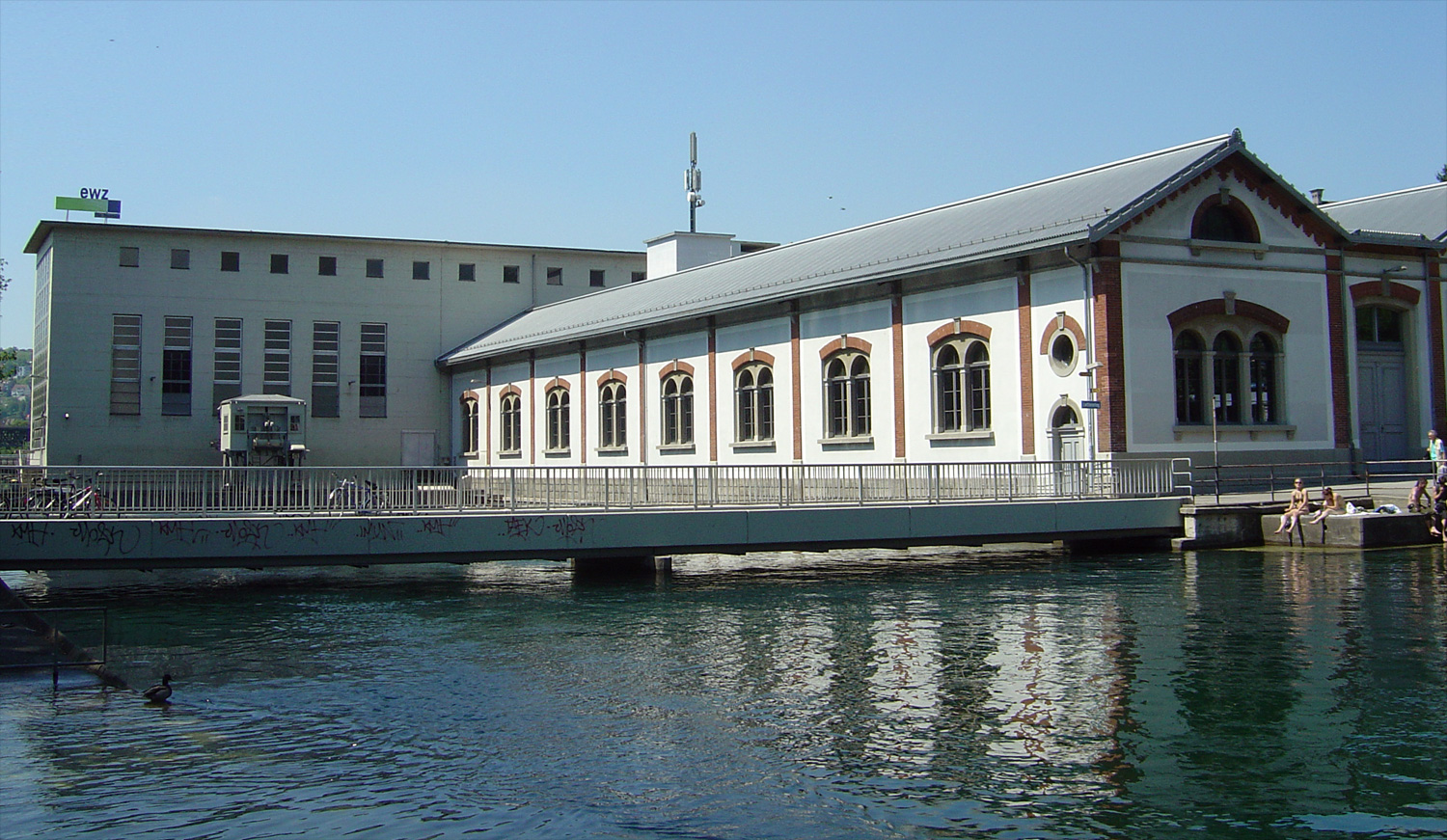
Letten Power Station in Zurich

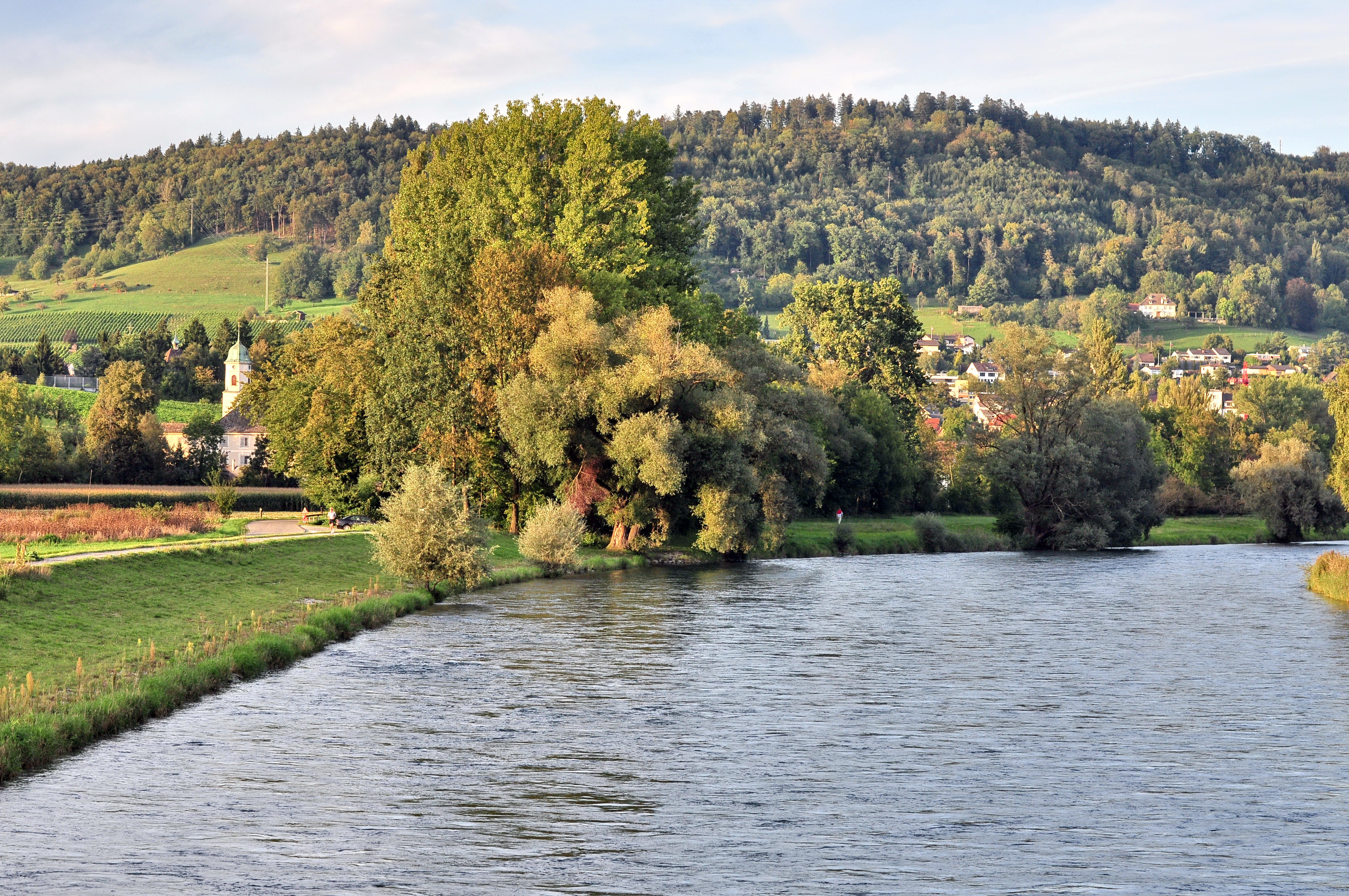
Kloster Fahr on the Limmat

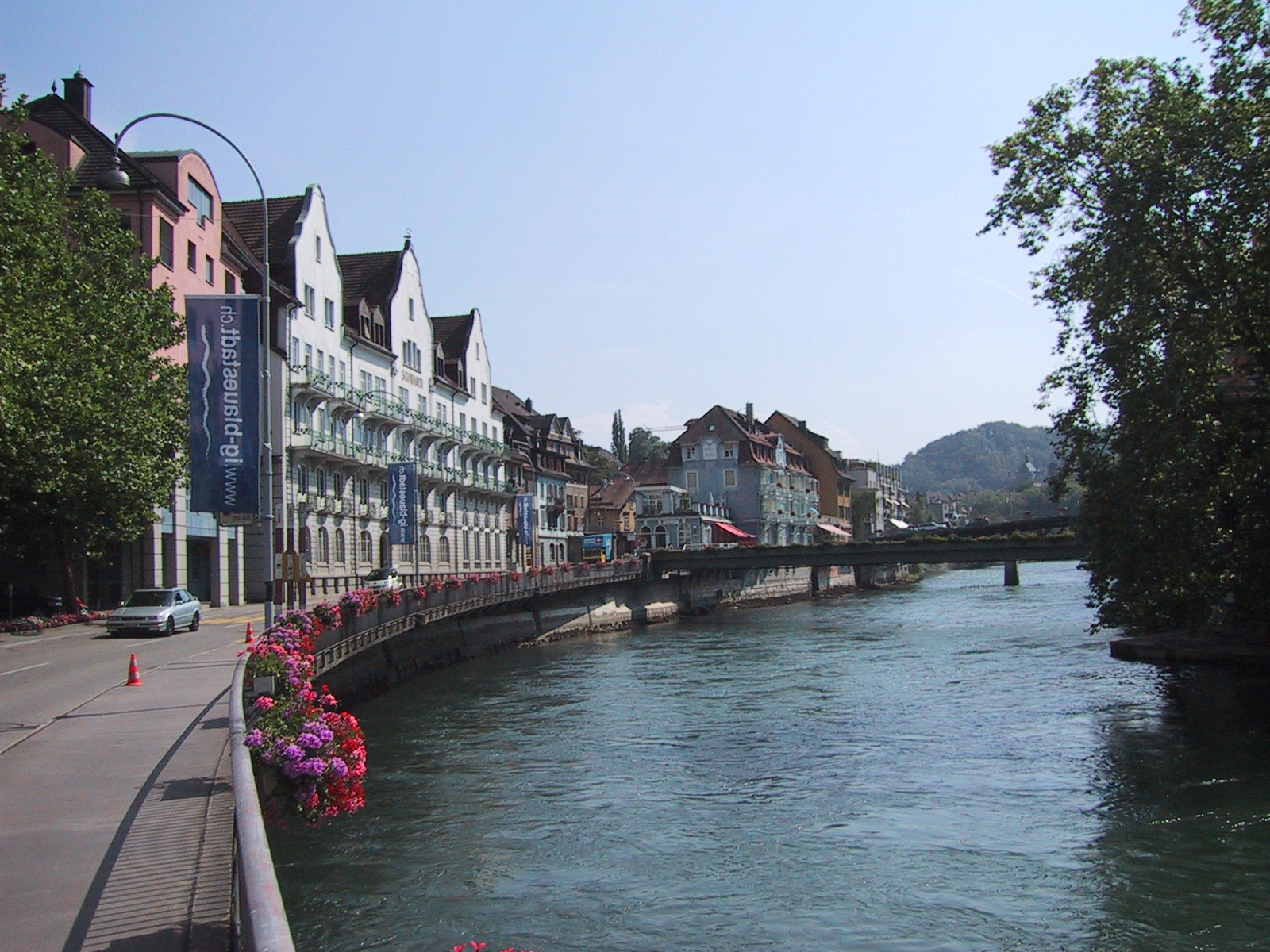
The Limmat in Ennetbaden

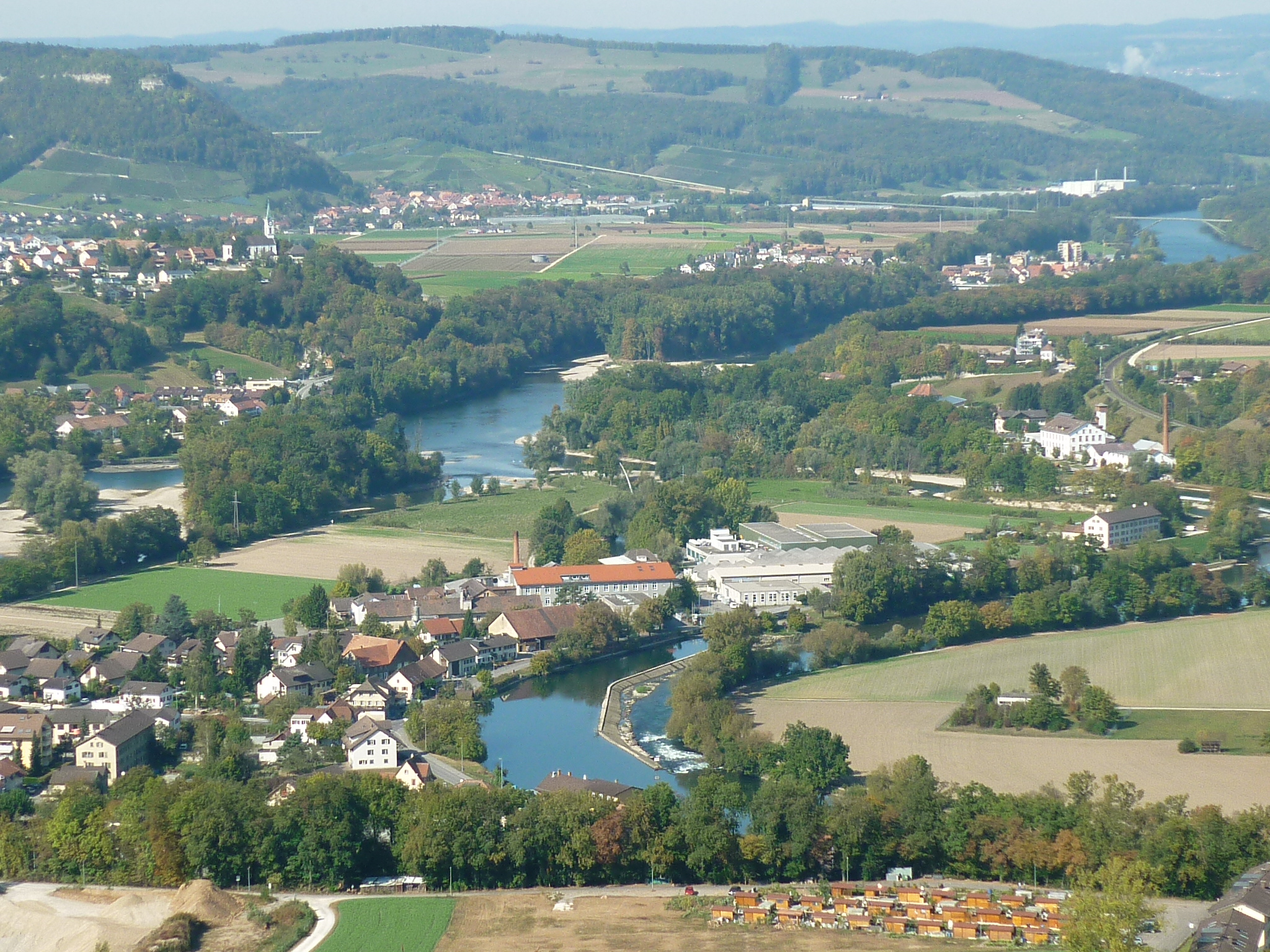
The confluence of the Aare (to the left) and Limmat

The Limmat is a river in Switzerland. The river commences at the outfall of Lake Zurich, in the southern part of the city of Zurich. From Zurich it flows in a northwesterly direction, continuing a further 35 km until it reaches the river Aare. The confluence is located north of the small town of Brugg and shortly after the mouth of the Reuss.

The main towns along the Limmat Valley downstream of Zurich are Dietikon, Wettingen, and Baden. Its main tributaries are the Linth, Wägitaler Aa and Jona, all via Lake Zurich, the Sihl in Zurich, and the Reppisch in Dietikon.

The hydronym is first attested in the 8th century, as Lindimacus. It is of Gaulish origin, from *lindo- "lake" (Welsh llyn) and *magos "plain" (Welsh maes), and was thus presumably in origin the name of the plain formed by the Linth.

== Power generation ==
Like many Swiss rivers, the Limmat is intensively used for production of hydroelectric power: along its course of 35 km (22 mi), its fall is used by no less than ten hydroelectric power stations. These include:

Station	Capacity (MW)	Location	Geographic coordinates
Aue Power Station	3.9	Baden	47°28′13″N 8°18′40″E
Dietikon Power Station	2.6	Dietikon	47°24′36″N 8°24′30″E
Höngg Power Station	1	Zurich	47°24′07″N 8°29′13″E
Kappelerhof Power Station	6.8	Baden	47°29′04″N 8°17′35″E
Letten Power Station	4	Zurich	47°23′15″N 8°31′56″E
Schiffmühle Power Station	2.6	Untersiggenthal	47°29′19″N 8°15′54″E
Turgi Power Station	1	Turgi	
Wettingen Power Station	26	Wettingen	47°27′24″N 8°19′14″E

== Navigation ==
Historically, the Limmat was an important navigation route. In the twelfth and thirteenth centuries, voyages from Zurich to Koblenz are recorded. In 1447, the Emperor Frederick III granted the privilege of free navigation on the Limmat and on the Rhine to Zurich. Because of the current, navigation was typically downstream only, with the barges being sold on arrival.

Today, the Limmat is navigable for much of its length by small craft only, with many of the hydroelectric power plants incorporating boat lifts. The traditional boat type used on the river is the weidling, a flat-bottomed vessel that is usually 10 metres (33 ft) long.

The uppermost stretch of the river through the centre of Zurich is navigable by rather larger vessels, albeit limited by low bridges. On this stretch of the river ZSG (Lake Zurich Navigation Company) operates its Limmat boat service, from the Landesmuseum to Lake Zurich, using low-profile motor boats.

== Towns near the river ==
- In the canton of Zurich:
  1. Zurich
  2. Oberengstringen
  3. Unterengstringen
  4. Schlieren
  5. Dietikon
  6. Geroldswil
  7. Oetwil an der Limmat
- In the canton of Aargau
  1. Spreitenbach
  2. Würenlos
  3. Neuenhof
  4. Wettingen
  5. Baden
  6. Ennetbaden
  7. Nussbaumen AG
  8. Untersiggenthal
  9. Turgi

== Cultural heritage ==
Located on the swamp land between Limmat and Lake Zurich around Sechseläutenplatz on small islands and peninsulas in Zurich, prehistoric pile dwellings around Lake Zurich were set on piles to protect against occasional flooding by the Linth and Jona. Zürich–Enge Alpenquai is located on Lake Zurich lakeshore in Enge, a locality of the municipality of Zurich. It was neighbored by the settlements at Kleiner Hafner and Grosser Hafner on a then peninsula respectively island in the effluence of the Limmat, within an area of about 0.2 square kilometres (49.42 acres) in the city of Zurich. As well as being part of the 56 Swiss sites of the UNESCO World Heritage Site Prehistoric pile dwellings around the Alps, the settlement is also listed in the Swiss inventory of cultural property of national and regional significance as a Class object.

== See also ==
- Rivers of Switzerland
