= BAG Turgi =

Swiss lighting company

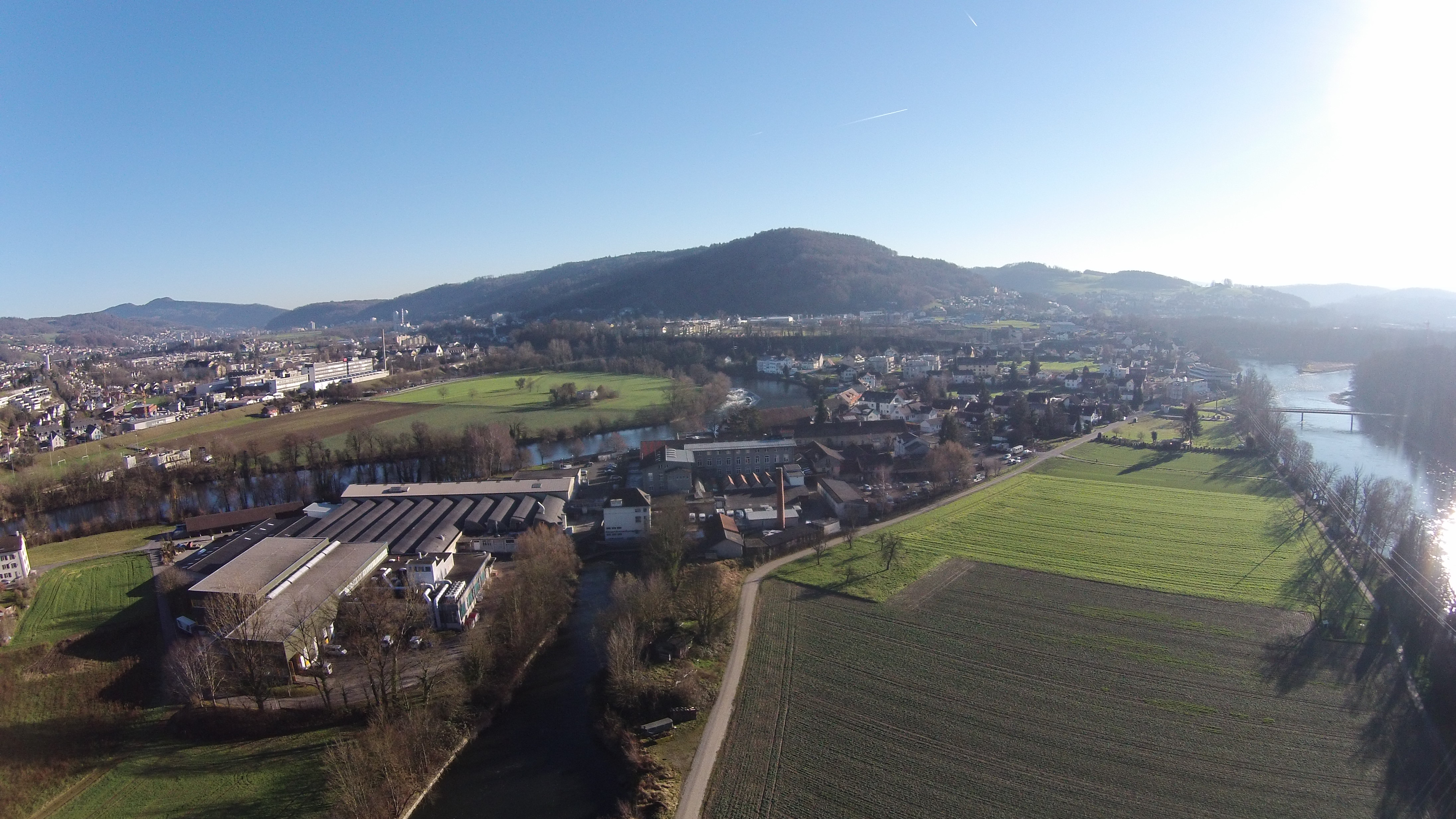
- BAG's former headquarters in Gebenstorf, Switzerland
- Native name: Bronzefabrik AG, Turgi
- Company type: Privately held company
- Founded: 1909; 117 years ago as Bronzewarenfabrik AG
- Founder: Wilhelm Egloff; Edmund Bebié; Albert Meierhofer; Hermann Gaiser
- Defunct: 1998
- Products: Lighting, street lamps
- Number of employees: 600 (1960s)

BAG Turgi (colloquially for Bronzewarenfabrik AG, Turgi) was a Swiss company which belonged to the largest lighting manufacturers in Europe during the 20th century. Headquartered in Gebenstorf, Switzerland, BAG manufactured lamps for street lighting, hotels and sports stadiums (notably 1994 Winter Olympics in Lillehammer, Norway).

The former manufacturing site in the Vogelsang section of Gebenstorf is being held by BAG Immobilien Ltd., for redevelopment purposes. In 2024, it became public that a developer, will develop 170 new apartments on the former manufacturing site.
