= Freienwil =

- Municipality
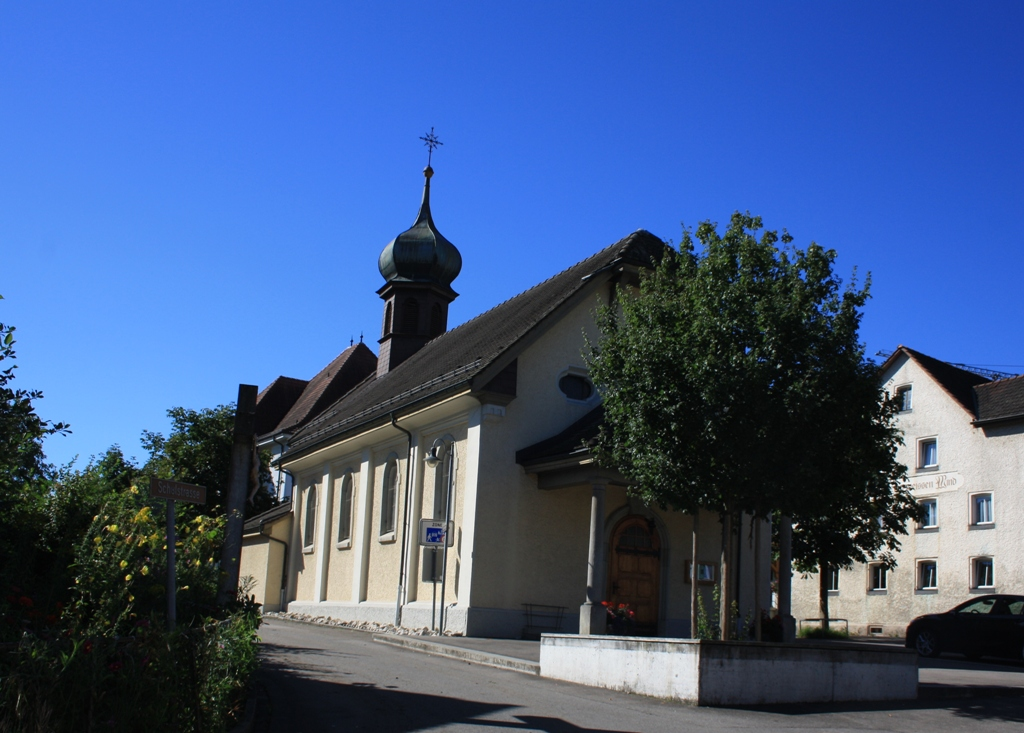

- Flag Coat of arms
- Location of Freienwil
- Location within Switzerland Location within Canton of Aargau
- Coordinates: 47°30′N 8°20′E
- Country: Switzerland
- Canton: Aargau
- District: Baden

Area
  - Total: 3.99 km^{2} (1.54 sq mi)
- Elevation: 465 m (1,526 ft)

Population (December 2020)
  - Total: 1,110
  - Density: 278/km^{2} (721/sq mi)
- Time zone: UTC+01:00 (CET)
  - Summer (DST): UTC+02:00 (CEST)
- Postal code: 5423
- SFOS number: 4028
- ISO 3166 code: CH-AG
- Surrounded by: Lengnau, Obersiggenthal, Unterehrendingen, Oberehrendingen, Ennetbaden
- Website: freienwil.ch

Freienwil is a municipality in the district of Baden in the canton of Aargau in Switzerland.

== History ==
Freienwil is first mentioned around 1227–1234 as Friginwillare.

== Geography ==
Freienwil has an area, as of 2006, of 4 km^{2} (1.5 sq mi). Of this area, 52.6% is used for agricultural purposes, while 38.5% is forested. The rest of the land (8.9%) is settled.

The village lies in the eastern edge of the Siggenbergs in a valley between the Limmat and the Surb valleys. The Rickenbach is the main stream.

== Coat of arms ==
The blazon of the municipal coat of arms is Azure a Garb Or in base sinister a Sickle Argent handled of the second.

== Demographics ==
Population growth

The historical population is given in the following table:

Historical population
Year	Pop.	±%
1799	280	—
1850	506	+80.7%
1900	370	−26.9%
1950	416	+12.4%
1975	495	+19.0%
1980	508	+2.6%
1990	647	+27.4%
2000	753	+16.4%

Freienwil has a population (as of 31 December 2020) of 1,110. As of 2008, 11.1% of the population was made up of foreign nationals. Over the last 10 years the population has grown at a rate of 22.4%. Most of the population (as of 2000) speaks German (94.2%), with French being second most common (1.7%) and English being third (1.5%).

The age distribution, as of 2008, in Freienwil is; 109 children or 12.4% of the population are between 0 and 9 years old and 112 teenagers or 12.7% are between 10 and 19. Of the adult population, 83 people or 9.4% of the population are between 20 and 29 years old. 92 people or 10.4% are between 30 and 39, 185 people or 21.0% are between 40 and 49, and 144 people or 16.3% are between 50 and 59. The senior population distribution is 91 people or 10.3% of the population are between 60 and 69 years old, 43 people or 4.9% are between 70 and 79, there are 21 people or 2.4% who are between 80 and 89, and there is 1 person who is 90 or older.

As of 2000, there were 21 homes with 1 or 2 persons in the household, 112 homes with 3 or 4 persons in the household, and 145 homes with 5 or more persons in the household. The average number of people per household was 2.62 individuals. In 2008 there were 192 single family homes (or 55.3% of the total) out of a total of 347 homes and apartments.

In the 2007 federal election the most popular party was the SVP which received 29.8% of the vote. The next three most popular parties were the SP (20.7%), the CVP (18.2%) and the Green Party (13.2%).

In Freienwil about 85.5% of the population (between age 25 and 64) have completed either non-mandatory upper secondary education or additional higher education (either university or a Fachhochschule). Of the school age population (in the 2008/2009 school year), there are 96 students attending primary school in the municipality. The municipality has a kindergarten and a primary school.

== Transportation ==
Freienwil lies on the little-used Kantonsstrasse between Ennetbaden and Lengnau. The village is served by the once-an-hour postbus (every 30 minutes at peak) operating on the Baden–Endingen–Tegerfelden route.

== Economy ==
The local economy is limited to a number of jobs in agriculture, in trade and within the service range. Most employed persons are commuters and work in Baden and Zürich.

As of 2007, Freienwil had an unemployment rate of 0.78%. As of 2005, there were 38 people employed in the primary economic sector and about 17 businesses involved in this sector. 18 people were employed in the secondary sector and there were six businesses in this sector. 51 people were employed in the tertiary sector, with 24 businesses in this sector.

As of 2000 there were 396 total workers who lived in the municipality. Of these, 339 or about 85.6% of the residents worked outside Freienwil while 16 people commuted into the municipality for work. There were a total of 73 jobs (of at least six hours per week) in the municipality.

== Religion ==
From the 2000 census, 415 or 55.1% are Roman Catholic, while 206 or 27.4% belonged to the Swiss Reformed Church.

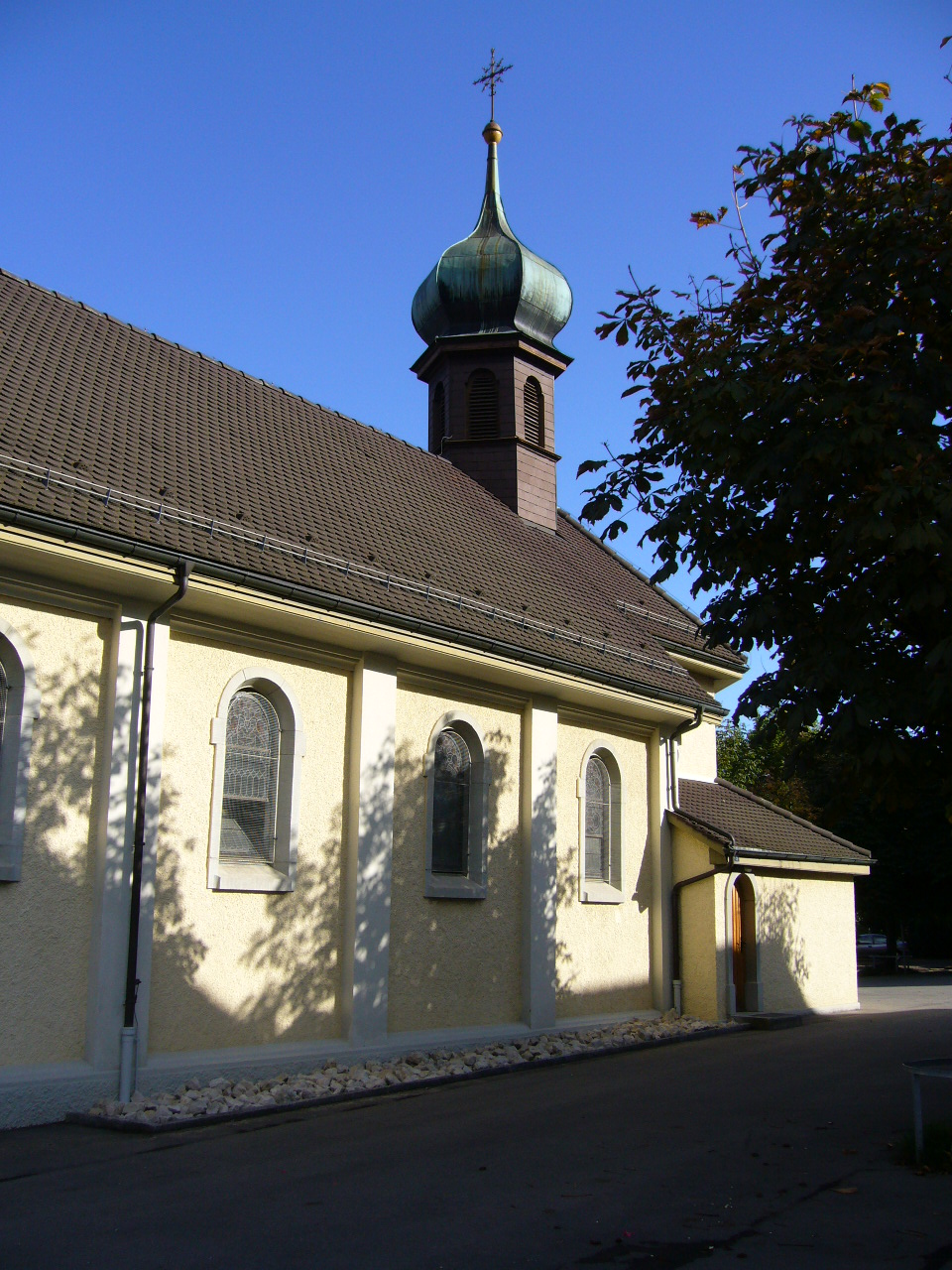
Catholic chapel in Freienwil
