= Obersiggenthal =

- Municipality
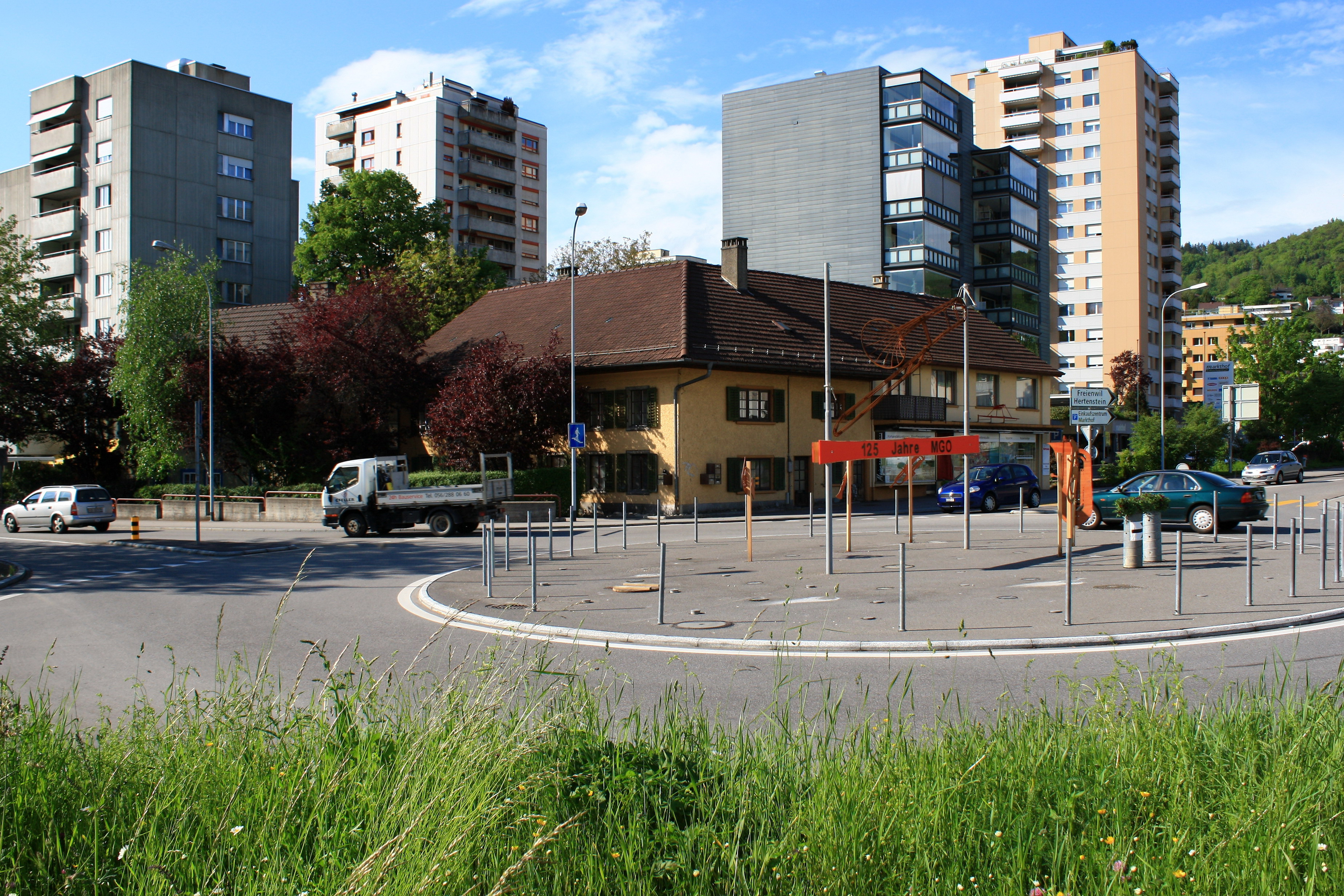

- Flag Coat of arms
- Location of Obersiggenthal
- Location within Switzerland Location within Canton of Aargau
- Coordinates: 47°29′N 8°18′E
- Country: Switzerland
- Canton: Aargau
- District: Baden

Area
  - Total: 8.36 km^{2} (3.23 sq mi)
- Elevation: 420 m (1,380 ft)
- Highest elevation (Ebne): 618 m (2,028 ft)
- Lowest elevation (Limmat at Schiffmühle): 340 m (1,120 ft)

Population (December 2020)
  - Total: 8,661
  - Density: 1,040/km^{2} (2,680/sq mi)
- Time zone: UTC+01:00 (CET)
  - Summer (DST): UTC+02:00 (CEST)
- Postal code: 5415
- SFOS number: 4038
- ISO 3166 code: CH-AG
- Localities: Nussbaumen, Kirchdorf, Rieden; Hertenstein, Tromsberg
- Surrounded by: Baden, Endingen, Ennetbaden, Freienwil, Lengnau, Turgi, Untersiggenthal, Würenlingen
- Website: obersiggenthal.ch

Obersiggenthal (High Alemannic: Obersiggetal) is a municipality located in the Limmat Valley, within the district of Baden, in the canton of Aargau, Switzerland.

== History ==
Obersiggenthal is first mentioned around 1303–08 as Sikental.

== Geography ==
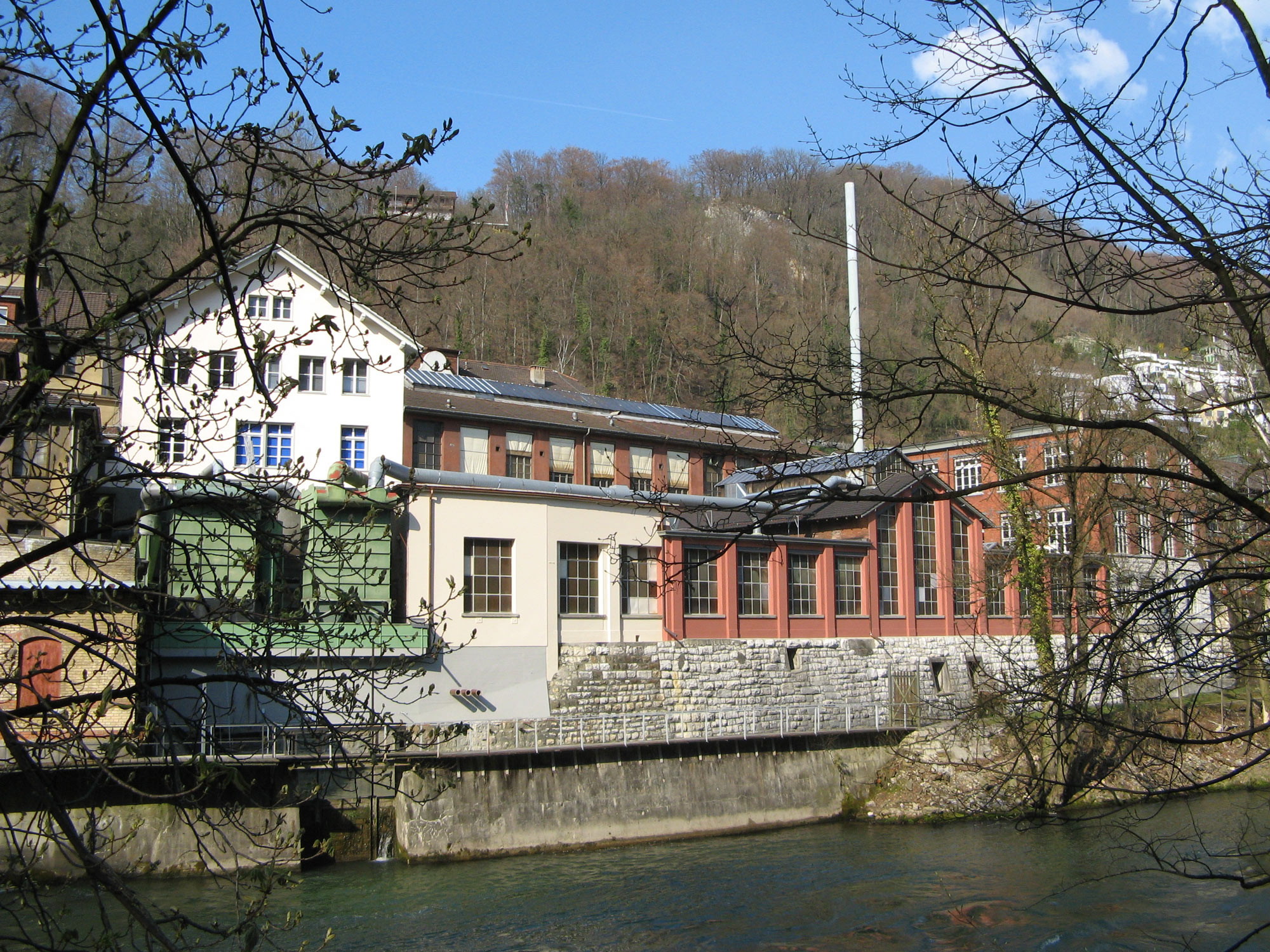
Former Oederlin AG Factory dock in Obersiggenthal-Rieden

Aerial view (1964)

Obersiggenthal has an area, as of 2006, of 8.4 km^{2} (3.2 sq mi). Of this area, 35.6% is used for agricultural purposes, while 43.5% is forested. Of the rest of the land, 19.6% is settled (buildings or roads) and the remainder (1.3%) is non-productive (rivers or lakes).

The municipality is located in the Baden district, between the Siggenberg and the Limmat river. It consists of the villages of Nussbaumen, Kirchdorf and Rieden and the hamlets of Tromsberg, Ebnet and Hertenstein.

== Coat of arms ==
The blazon of the municipal coat of arms is Gules two Keys Argent in saltire crossed by the third double warded in Pale.

== Demographics ==
Obersiggenthal has a population (as of 31 December 2020) of 8,661. As of 2008, 32.1% of the population was made up of foreign nationals. Over the last 10 years the population has grown at a rate of 6.8%. Most of the population (as of 2000) speaks German (80.7%), with Serbo-Croatian being second most common ( 4.8%) and Italian being third ( 2.6%).

The age distribution, as of 2008, in Obersiggenthal is; 782 children or 9.6% of the population are between 0 and 9 years old and 883 teenagers or 10.8% are between 10 and 19. Of the adult population, 944 people or 11.5% of the population are between 20 and 29 years old. 1,182 people or 14.5% are between 30 and 39, 1,349 people or 16.5% are between 40 and 49, and 1,010 people or 12.4% are between 50 and 59. The senior population distribution is 977 people or 12.0% of the population are between 60 and 69 years old, 660 people or 8.1% are between 70 and 79, there are 337 people or 4.1% who are between 80 and 89, and there are 50 people or 0.6% who are 90 and older.

As of 2000, there were 508 homes with 1 or 2 persons in the household, 1,733 homes with 3 or 4 persons in the household, and 976 homes with 5 or more persons in the household. The average number of people per household was 2.26 individuals. In 2008 there were 960 single family homes (or 25.4% of the total) out of a total of 3,783 homes and apartments.

In the 2007 federal election the most popular party was the SVP which received 29.6% of the vote. The next three most popular parties were the SP (19.3%), the CVP (18.9%) and the FDP (15.1%).

In Obersiggenthal about 76.5% of the population (between age 25–64) have completed either non-mandatory upper secondary education or additional higher education (either university or a Fachhochschule). Of the school age population (in the 2008/2009 school year), there are 529 students attending primary school, there are 213 students attending secondary school, there are 174 students attending tertiary or university level schooling in the municipality.

The historical population is given in the following table:

Historical population
Year	Pop.	±%
1780	631	—
1803	755	+19.7%
1850	1,183	+56.7%
1900	1,504	+27.1%
1950	2,856	+89.9%
2000	7,561	+164.7%

== Heritage sites of national significance ==
The tithe barn at Kirchweg 14 is listed as a Swiss heritage site of national significance.

== Economy ==
As of 2007, Obersiggenthal had an unemployment rate of 2.36%. As of 2005, there were 77 people employed in the primary economic sector and about 24 businesses involved in this sector. 360 people are employed in the secondary sector and there are 58 businesses in this sector. 1,098 people are employed in the tertiary sector, with 187 businesses in this sector.

As of 2000 there were 3,850 total workers who lived in the municipality. Of these, 3,150 or about 81.8% of the residents worked outside Obersiggenthal while 712 people commuted into the municipality for work. There were a total of 1,412 jobs (of at least 6 hours per week) in the municipality.

== Religion ==
From the 2000 census, 3,540 or 46.8% are Roman Catholic, while 1,927 or 25.5% belonged to the Swiss Reformed Church. Of the rest of the population, there are 8 individuals (or about 0.11% of the population) who belong to the Christian Catholic faith.
