= Ennetbaden =

- Municipality
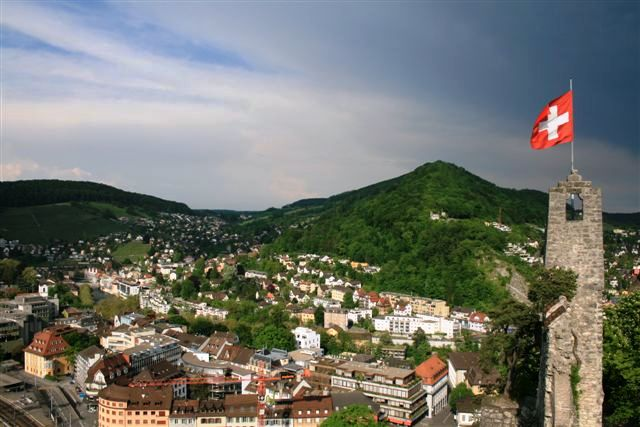

- Flag Coat of arms
- Location of Ennetbaden
- Location within Switzerland Location within Canton of Aargau
- Coordinates: 47°29′N 8°19′E
- Country: Switzerland
- Canton: Aargau
- District: Baden

Government
  - Mayor: Gemeindeammann; Basil Müller FDP/PRD (as of 2008)

Area
  - Total: 2.11 km^{2} (0.81 sq mi)
- Elevation: 360 m (1,180 ft)

Population (December 2020)
  - Total: 3,486
  - Density: 1,650/km^{2} (4,280/sq mi)
- Time zone: UTC+01:00 (CET)
  - Summer (DST): UTC+02:00 (CEST)
- Postal code: 5408
- SFOS number: 4026
- ISO 3166 code: CH-AG
- Surrounded by: Baden, Freienwil, Oberehrendingen, Obersiggenthal, Wettingen
- Website: ennetbaden.ch

Ennetbaden is a municipality in the district of Baden in the canton of Aargau in Switzerland, located in the Limmat Valley (German: Limmattal).

Aerial view (1967)

== History ==
Ennetbaden is first mentioned about 1261–64 as Alio Badin.

== Geography ==
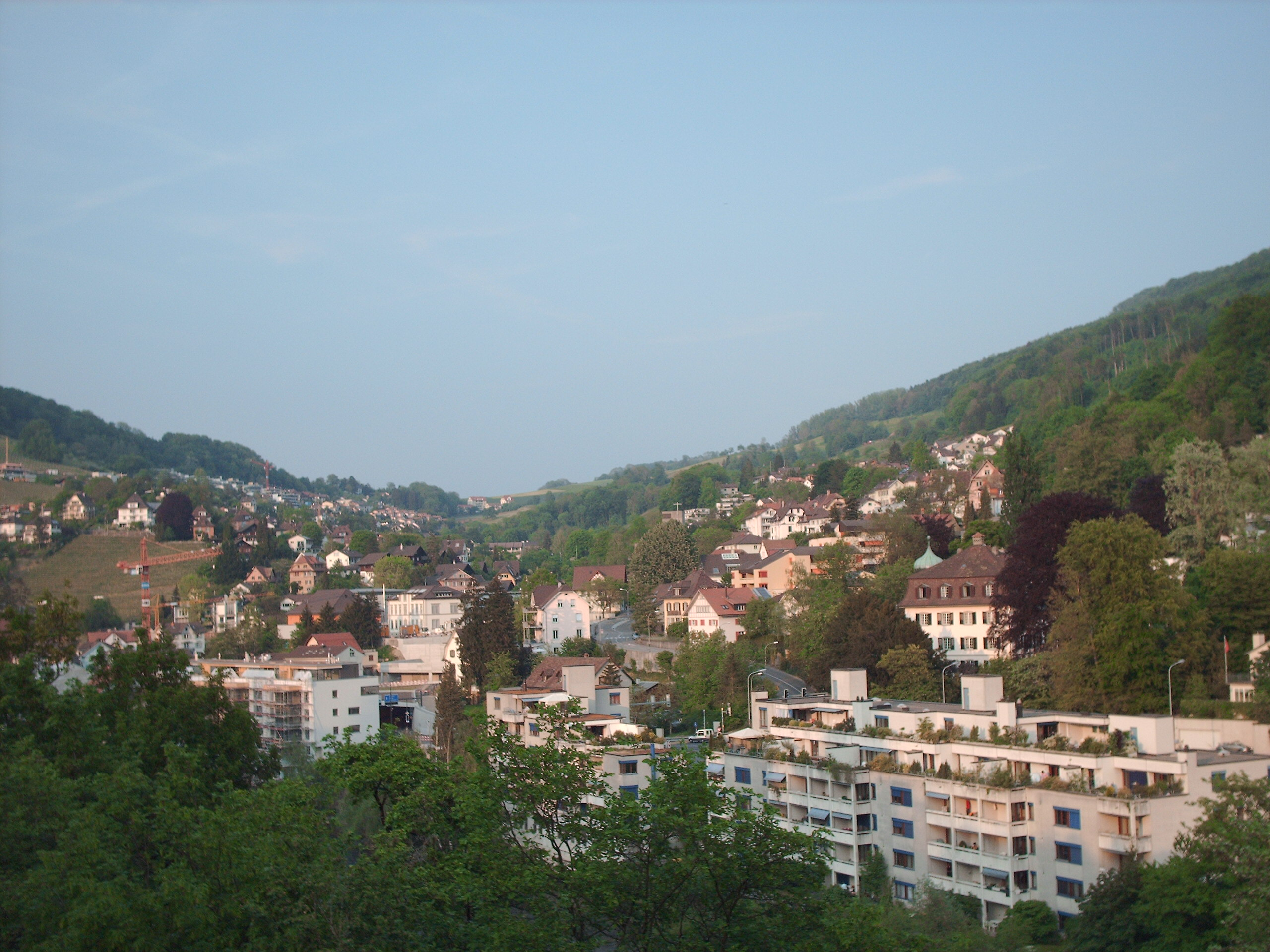
Ennetbaden seen from Baden (direction West)

Ennetbaden has an area, as of 2006, of 2.1 km^{2} (0.81 sq mi). Of this area, 20.9% is used for agricultural purposes, while 42.7% is forested. Of the rest of the land, 33.6% is settled (buildings or roads) and the remainder (2.8%) is non-productive (rivers or lakes).

The municipality is located in the Baden district on the right bank of the Limmat river. It consists of the village of Ennetbaden which is a suburb of Baden.

== Coat of arms ==
The blazon of the municipal coat of arms is Or a Pale and Chief Sable.

== Demographics ==
Ennetbaden has a population (as of 31 December 2020) of 3,486. As of 2008, 21.0% of the population was made up of foreign nationals. Over the last 10 years the population has decreased at a rate of -1%. Most of the population (as of 2000) speaks German (83.8%), with French being second most common (2.4%) and Italian being third (2.2%).

The age distribution, as of 2008, in Ennetbaden is; 272 children or 9.1% of the population are between 0 and 9 years old and 208 teenagers or 6.9% are between 10 and 19. Of the adult population, 415 people or 13.8% of the population are between 20 and 29 years old. 489 people or 16.3% are between 30 and 39, 511 people or 17.0% are between 40 and 49, and 427 people or 14.2% are between 50 and 59. The senior population distribution is 354 people or 11.8% of the population are between 60 and 69 years old, 178 people or 5.9% are between 70 and 79, there are 120 people or 4.0% who are between 80 and 89, and there are 28 people or 0.9% who are 90 and older.

As of 2000, there were 243 homes with 1 or 2 persons in the household, 645 homes with 3 or 4 persons in the household, and 476 homes with 5 or more persons in the household. The average number of people per household was 2.08 individuals. In 2008 there were 518 single family homes (or 31.6% of the total) out of a total of 1,639 homes and apartments.

In the 2007 federal election the most popular party was the SP which received 26.5% of the vote. The next three most popular parties were the FDP (19.7%), the SVP (18.9%) and the Green Party (13.7%).

The entire Swiss population is generally well educated. In Ennetbaden about 85.1% of the population (between age 25-64) have completed either non-mandatory upper secondary education or additional higher education (either university or a Fachhochschule). Of the school age population (in the 2008/2009 school year), there are 158 students attending primary school in the municipality.

The historical population is given in the following table:

Historical population
Year	Pop.	±%
1850	451	—
1900	997	+121.1%
1910	1,387	+39.1%
1930	2,223	+60.3%
1950	2,566	+15.4%
1975	2,712	+5.7%
1980	2,534	−6.6%
1990	2,915	+15.0%
2000	3,019	+3.6%

== Economy ==
As of 2007, Ennetbaden had an unemployment rate of 1.97%. As of 2005, there were 39 people employed in the primary economic sector and about 8 businesses involved in this sector. 23 people are employed in the secondary sector and there are 9 businesses in this sector. 537 people are employed in the tertiary sector, with 89 businesses in this sector.

As of 2000 there were 1,709 total workers who lived in the municipality. Of these, 1,504 or about 88.0% of the residents worked outside Ennetbaden while 371 people commuted into the municipality for work. There were a total of 576 jobs (of at least 6 hours per week) in the municipality.

== Religion ==
From the 2000 census, 1,230 or 40.7% are Roman Catholic, while 980 or 32.5% belonged to the Swiss Reformed Church. Of the rest of the population, there is 1 individual who belongs to the Christian Catholic faith.
