= Ehrendingen =

- Municipality
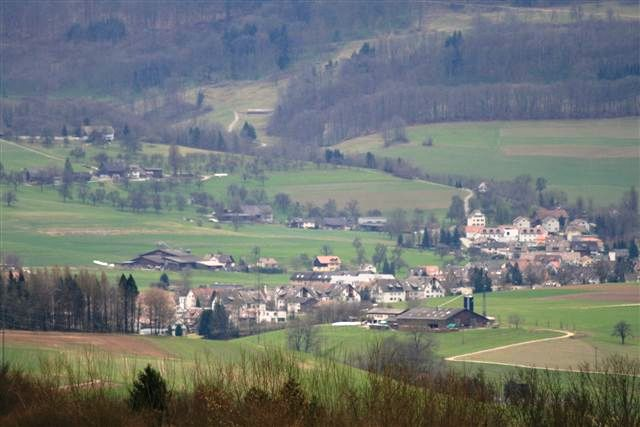

- Flag Coat of arms
- Location of Ehrendingen
- Location within Switzerland Location within Canton of Aargau
- Coordinates: 47°30′N 8°21′E
- Country: Switzerland
- Canton: Aargau
- District: Baden

Government
  - Mayor: Renato Sinelli Pro Ehrendingen (as of 2006-2009)

Area
  - Total: 7.31 km^{2} (2.82 sq mi)
- Elevation (at Lägern Mountains): 450 m (1,480 ft)

Population (December 2020)
  - Total: 4,880
  - Density: 668/km^{2} (1,730/sq mi)
- Time zone: UTC+01:00 (CET)
  - Summer (DST): UTC+02:00 (CEST)
- Postal code: 5420
- SFOS number: 4049
- ISO 3166 code: CH-AG
- Surrounded by: Schneisingen, Niederweningen, Wettingen, Ennetbaden, Freienwil, Lengnau
- Website: ehrendingen.ch

Ehrendingen is a municipality in the district of Baden in the canton of Aargau in Switzerland.

Aerial view (1967)

== History ==
Ehrendingen was formed on 1 January 2006 from the union of Oberehrendingen and Unterehrendingen, which have existed as separate municipalities since 1825.

== Geography ==
Ehrendingen has an area, as of 2006, of 7.3 km^{2} (2.8 sq mi). Of this area, 58.3% is used for agricultural purposes, while 28.5% is forested. Of the rest of the land, 13.1% is settled (buildings or roads) and the remainder (0.1%) is non-productive (rivers or lakes).

The municipality lies on the northern foot of the Lägern. It belongs to the Zurich Metropolitan Area, though is on the edge of the Area. The next largest city would be Baden, which has a population of about 17,000. The two parts of the village has grown together and follow a creek where it rises to the Lägern.

In 2006 the municipality was created through the merger of Oberehrendingen and Unterehrendingen.

== Demographics ==
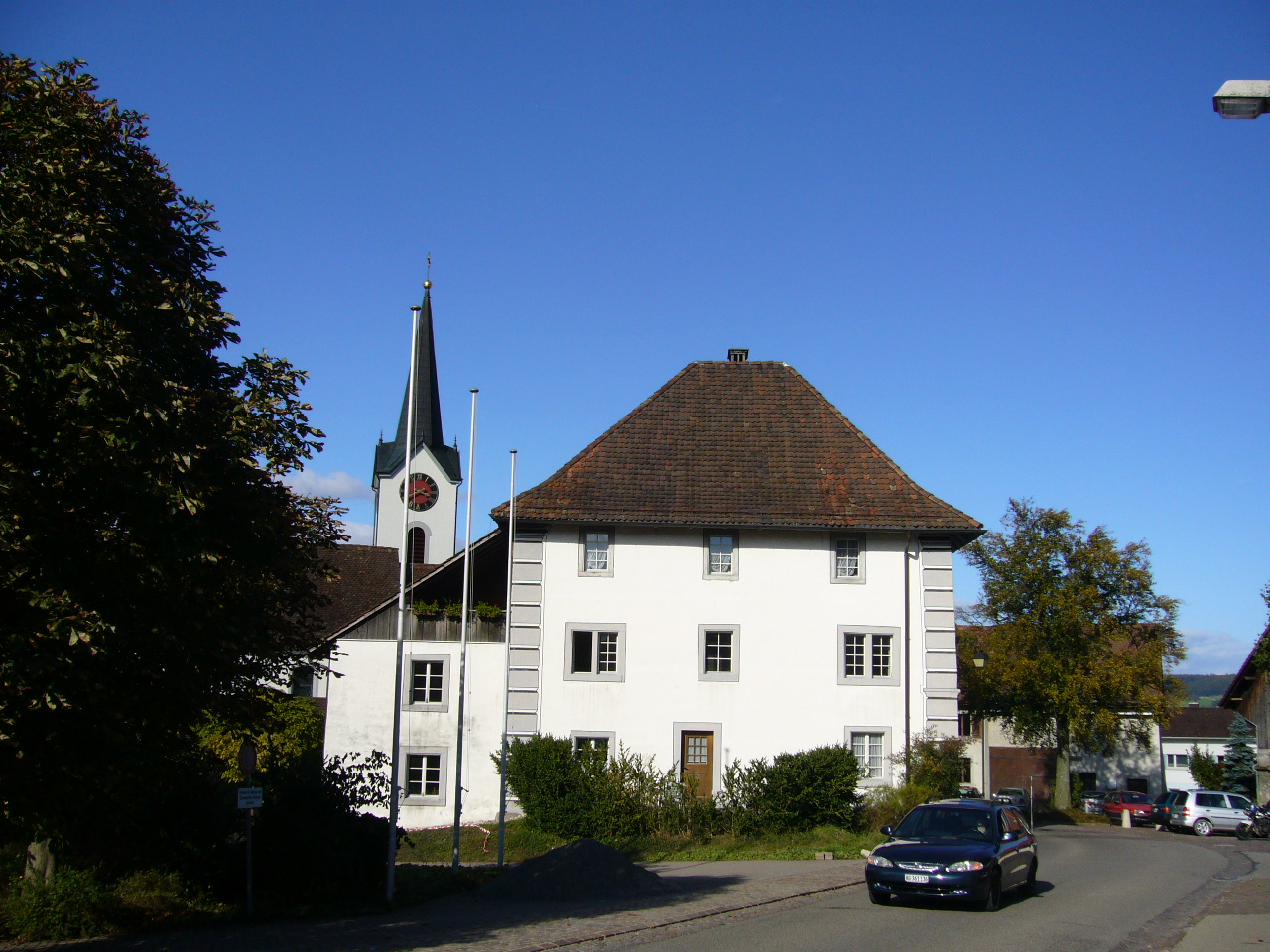
Ehrendingen village and town hall

Ehrendingen has a population (as of 31 December 2020) of 4,880. As of 2008, 14.6% of the population was made up of foreign nationals. Over the last 10 years the population has grown at a rate of 21.2%. Most of the population (as of 2000) speaks German (92.2%), with Italian being second most common ( 1.5%) and English being third ( 1.0%).

The age distribution, as of 2008, in Ehrendingen is; 458 children or 11.5% of the population are between 0 and 9 years old and 497 teenagers or 12.5% are between 10 and 19. Of the adult population, 393 people or 9.9% of the population are between 20 and 29 years old. 525 people or 13.2% are between 30 and 39, 727 people or 18.3% are between 40 and 49, and 532 people or 13.4% are between 50 and 59. The senior population distribution is 447 people or 11.3% of the population are between 60 and 69 years old, 271 people or 6.8% are between 70 and 79, there are 106 people or 2.7% who are between 80 and 89, and there are 10 people or 0.3% who are 90 and older.

According to the census in 2000, 52.3% were Roman Catholic, 31.8% Protestant, 2.2% Muslim and 1.4% belong to another faith.

In the 2007 federal election the most popular party was the SVP which received 36.8% of the vote. The next two most popular parties were the CVP (17.1%), and the FDP (10.8%).

Historical population
Year	Pop.	±%
1900	966	—
1930	1,135	+17.5%
1950	1,337	+17.8%
1960	1,653	+23.6%
1970	2,362	+42.9%
1990	2,958	+25.2%
2000	3,299	+11.5%
2010	4,207	+27.5%

== Coat of arms ==
The municipal coat of arms of the blazon reads: Divided by blue, with the dividing line, yellow deer border and white, from cracked green fir, the symbols of the sub-arms of Unterehrendingen and Oberehrendingen

== Education ==
Ehrendingen has four kindergartens, a primary school, a secondary school and a Realschule. The highest school, the Bezirksschule (district school), may be visited in Baden or in Endingen. After four years in the Bezirksschule students with a good grade point average (4,7) can go to the Kantonsschule (state school/college), which lasts 4 years and is located in Baden.

The entire Swiss population is generally well educated. In Ehrendingen about 84.1% of the population (between age 25–64) have completed either non-mandatory upper secondary education or additional higher education (either university or a Fachhochschule). Of the school age population (in the 2008/2009 school year), there are 341 students attending primary school, there are 139 students attending secondary school in the municipality.

== Transport and traffic ==
Ehrendingen is located on the Route 17, between Baden and the Surb valley, a side road leads to Freienwil. The village is enclosed by three Postauto lines that traffic from Baden to Endingen (352), Baden to Freienwil (353) and Baden to Kaiserstuhl (354). Ehrendingen has six bus stations (Höhtal, Breitwies, Post, Niedermatt, Unterdorf, Tiefenwaag). The Postauto line 353 only goes as far as bus station Niedermatt before turning off to Freienwil. The neighboring village Niederweningen has a railway station to Zürich.

== Economy ==
As of 2007, Ehrendingen had an unemployment rate of 2.08%. As of 2005, there were 88 people employed in the primary economic sector and about 30 businesses involved in this sector. 165 people are employed in the secondary sector and there are 47 businesses in this sector. 365 people are employed in the tertiary sector, with 75 businesses in this sector.
