= Turgi =

Former municipality in Switzerland

- Former municipality
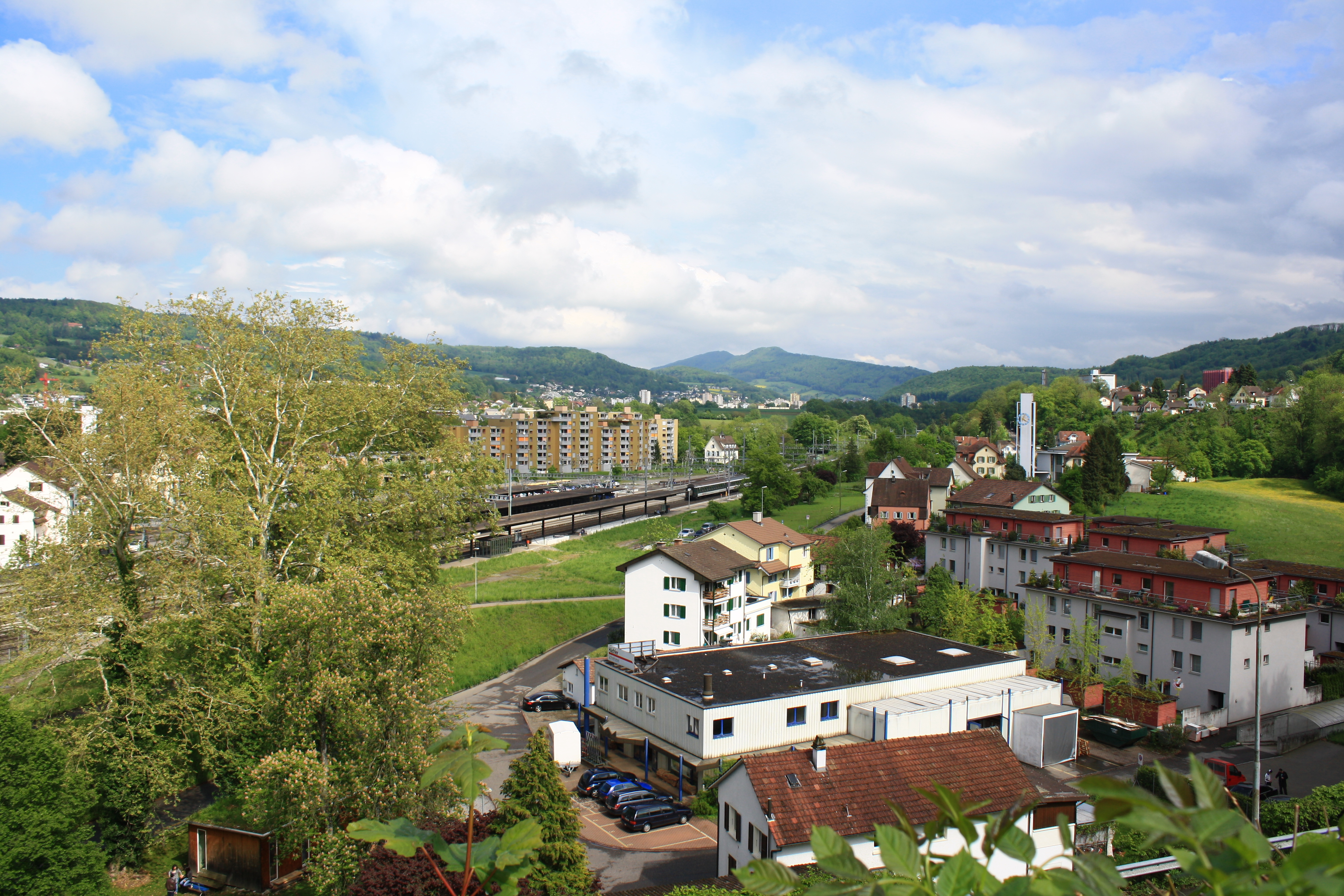

- Flag Coat of arms
- Location of Turgi
- Location within Switzerland Location within Canton of Aargau
- Coordinates: 47°30′N 8°15′E
- Country: Switzerland
- Canton: Aargau
- District: Baden

Area
  - Total: 1.55 km^{2} (0.60 sq mi)
- Elevation: 342 m (1,122 ft)

Population (December 2020)
  - Total: 8,661
  - Density: 5,590/km^{2} (14,500/sq mi)
- Time zone: UTC+01:00 (CET)
  - Summer (DST): UTC+02:00 (CEST)
- Postal code: 5300
- SFOS number: 4042
- ISO 3166 code: CH-AG
- Surrounded by: Baden, Gebenstorf, Obersiggenthal, Untersiggenthal
- Website: www.turgi.ch

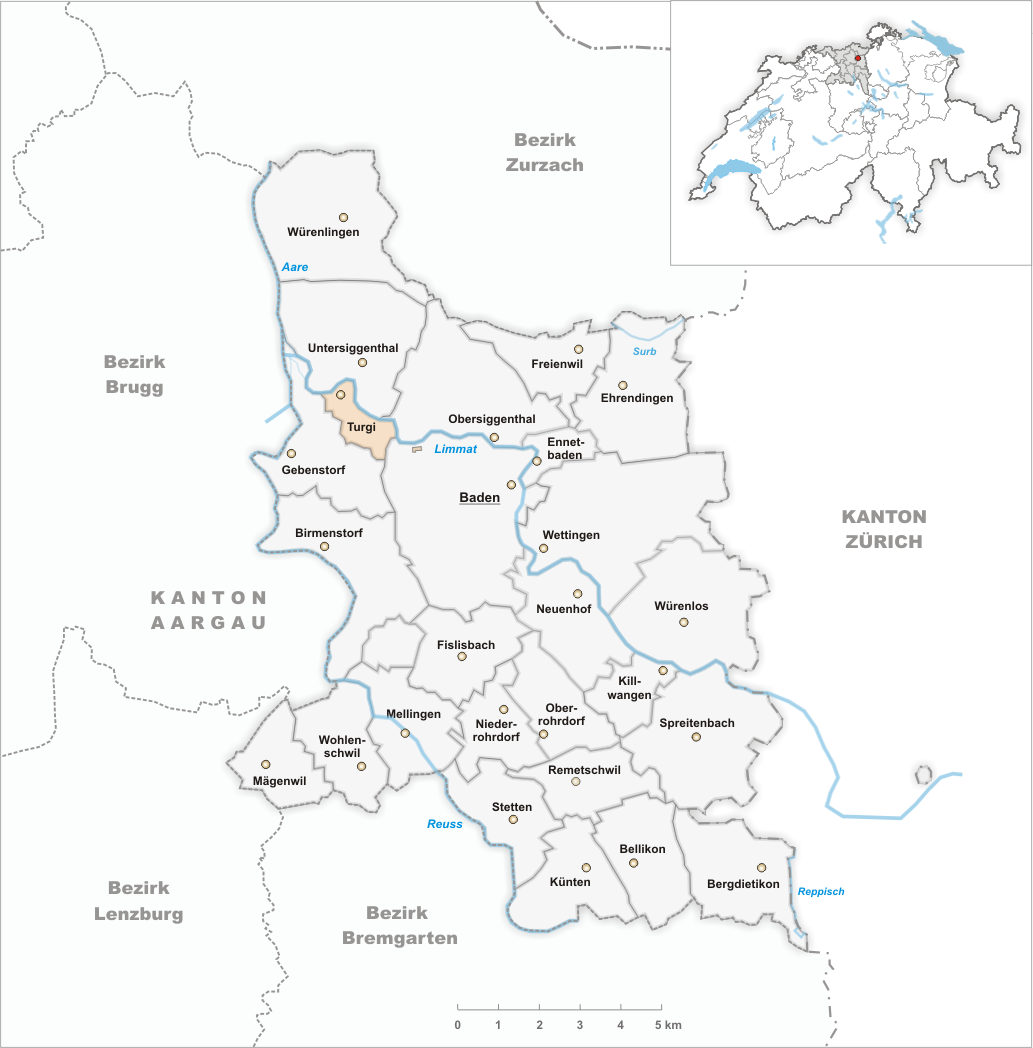
Turgi

Turgi is a former municipality in the district of Baden in the canton of Aargau in Switzerland, located in the Limmat Valley (German: Limmattal). It merged with Baden on 1 January 2024.

In 2002, Turgi received the Wakker Prize for the preservation of its architectural heritage.

== History ==
In 1883 the municipality was created when it separated from Gebenstorf.

== Geography ==
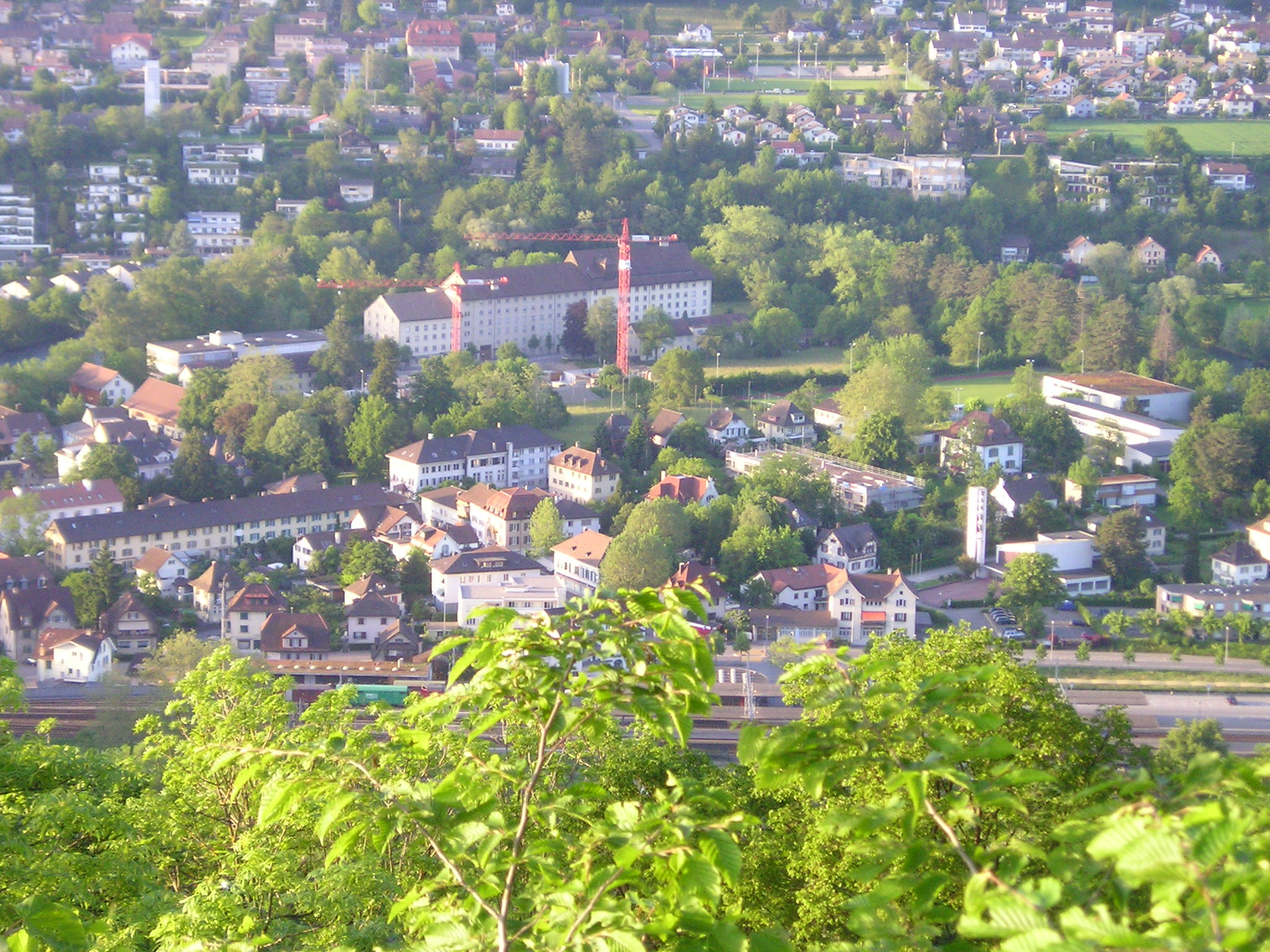
Turgi

Aerial view (1958)

Turgi has an area, as of 2006, of 1.5 square kilometers (0.58 sq mi). Of this area, 17.6% is used for agricultural purposes, while 35.9% is forested. Of the rest of the land, 42.5% is settled (buildings or roads) and the remainder (3.9%) is non-productive (rivers or lakes).

== Coat of arms ==
The blazon of the municipal coat of arms is Gules a Bend sinister wavy Argent between a Cog Wheel Sable in chief and Ear of Wheat Or bendwise sinister in base.

== Demographics ==
Turgi has a population (as of 31 December 2020) of 2,963. As of 2008, 40.5% of the population was made up of foreign nationals. Over the last 10 years the population has grown at a rate of 17%. Most of the population (as of 2000) speaks German (73.2%), with Italian being second most common ( 7.6%) and Albanian being third ( 3.2%).

The age distribution, as of 2008, in Turgi is; 332 children or 11.5% of the population are between 0 and 9 years old and 298 teenagers or 10.4% are between 10 and 19. Of the adult population, 451 people or 15.7% of the population are between 20 and 29 years old. 424 people or 14.7% are between 30 and 39, 485 people or 16.8% are between 40 and 49, and 390 people or 13.5% are between 50 and 59. The senior population distribution is 238 people or 8.3% of the population are between 60 and 69 years old, 162 people or 5.6% are between 70 and 79, there are 86 people or 3.0% who are between 80 and 89, and there are 13 people or 0.5% who are 90 and older.

As of 2000, there were 199 homes with 1 or 2 persons in the household, 650 homes with 3 or 4 persons in the household, and 225 homes with 5 or more persons in the household. The average number of people per household was 2.15 individuals. In 2008 there were 280 single family homes (or 20.6% of the total) out of a total of 1,362 homes and apartments. There were a total of 5 empty apartments for a 0.4% vacancy rate. As of 2007, the construction rate of new housing units was 29.4 new units per 1000 residents.

In the 2007 federal election the most popular party was the SVP which received 33% of the vote. The next three most popular parties were the SP (23.4%), the Green Party (11.5%) and the FDP (11.3%).

In Turgi about 65.7% of the population (between age 25–64) have completed either non-mandatory upper secondary education or additional higher education (either university or a Fachhochschule). Of the school age population (in the 2008/2009 school year), there are 224 students attending primary school, there are 171 students attending tertiary or university level schooling in the municipality.

The historical population is given in the following table:

Historical population
Year	Pop.	±%
1975	2,702	—
1980	2,638	−2.4%
1990	2,616	−0.8%
2000	2,446	−6.5%

== Economy ==
As of 2007, Turgi had an unemployment rate of 3.37%. As of 2005, there were 7 people employed in the primary economic sector and about 2 businesses involved in this sector. 1,162 people are employed in the secondary sector and there are 20 businesses in this sector. 485 people are employed in the tertiary sector, with 85 businesses in this sector.

As of 2000 there were 1,307 total workers who lived in the municipality. Of these, 1,091 or about 83.5% of the residents worked outside Turgi while 1,560 people commuted into the municipality for work. There were a total of 1,776 jobs (of at least 6 hours per week) in the municipality. Of the working population, 35.5% used public transportation to get to work, and 37.8% used a private car.

== Transportation ==
Turgi railway station is a stop of the S-Bahn Zürich on the line S12.

== Religion ==
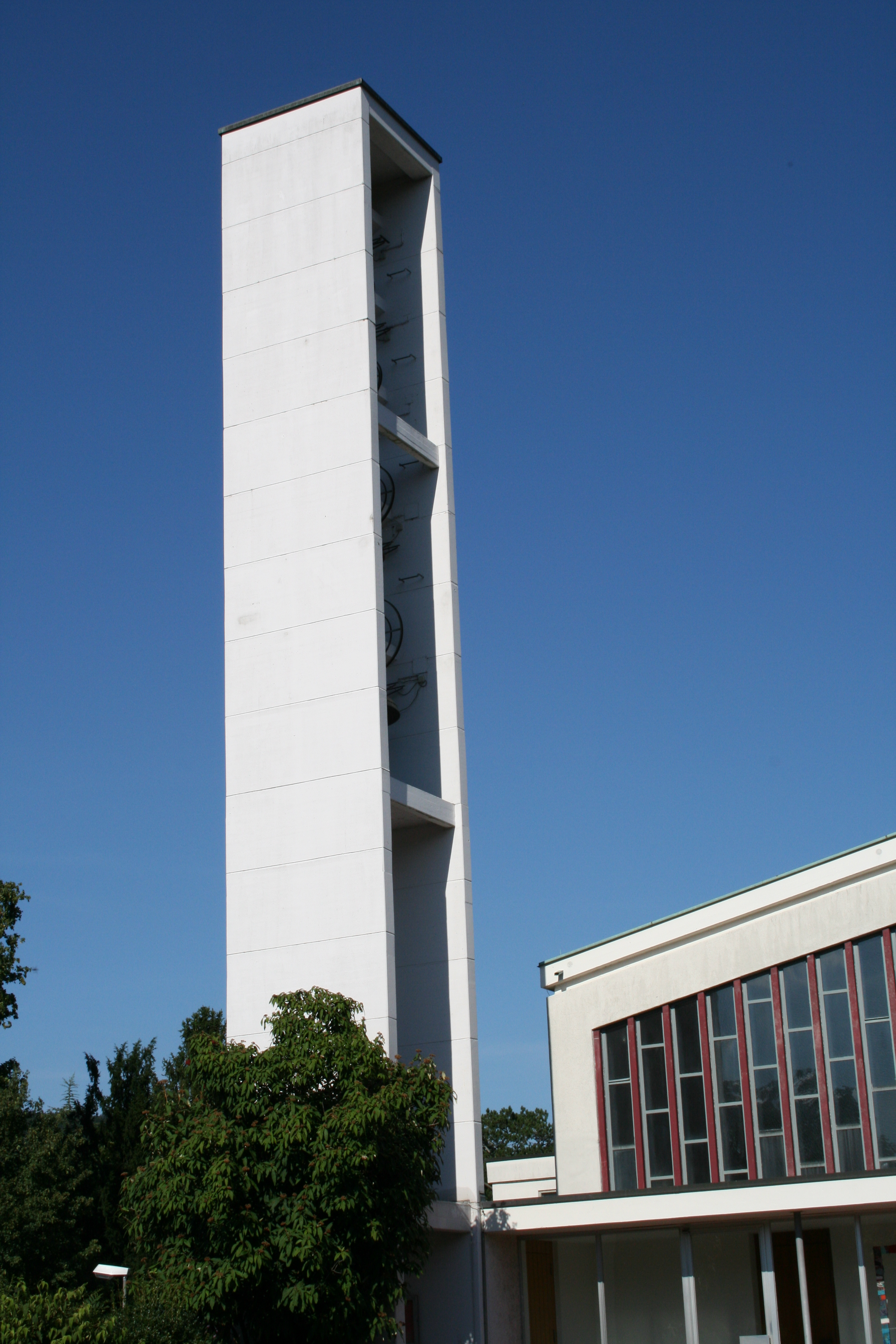
Swiss Reformed Church of Turgi

From the 2000 census, 1,043 or 43.5% are Roman Catholic, while 585 or 24.4% belonged to the Swiss Reformed Church. Of the rest of the population, there are 3 individuals (or about 0.13% of the population) who belong to the Christian Catholic faith.
