= Untersiggenthal =

- Municipality
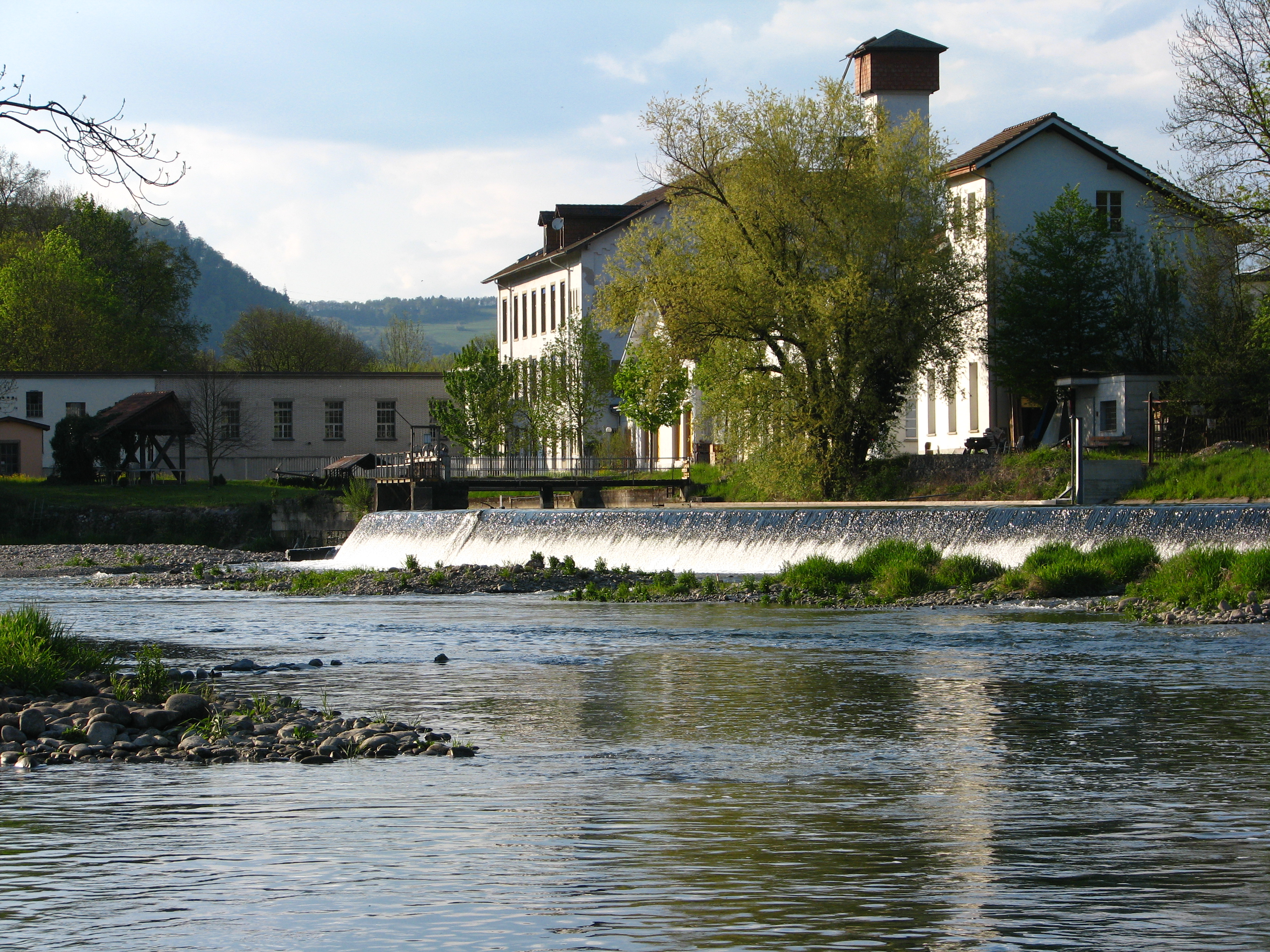

- Flag Coat of arms
- Location of Untersiggenthal
- Location within Switzerland Location within Canton of Aargau
- Coordinates: 47°30′N 8°15′E
- Country: Switzerland
- Canton: Aargau
- District: Baden

Area
  - Total: 8.36 km^{2} (3.23 sq mi)
- Elevation: 375 m (1,230 ft)

Population (December 2020)
  - Total: 7,229
  - Density: 865/km^{2} (2,240/sq mi)
- Time zone: UTC+01:00 (CET)
  - Summer (DST): UTC+02:00 (CEST)
- Postal code: 5417
- SFOS number: 4044
- ISO 3166 code: CH-AG
- Surrounded by: Brugg, Gebenstorf, Obersiggenthal, Turgi, Villigen, Würenlingen
- Website: www.untersiggenthal.ch

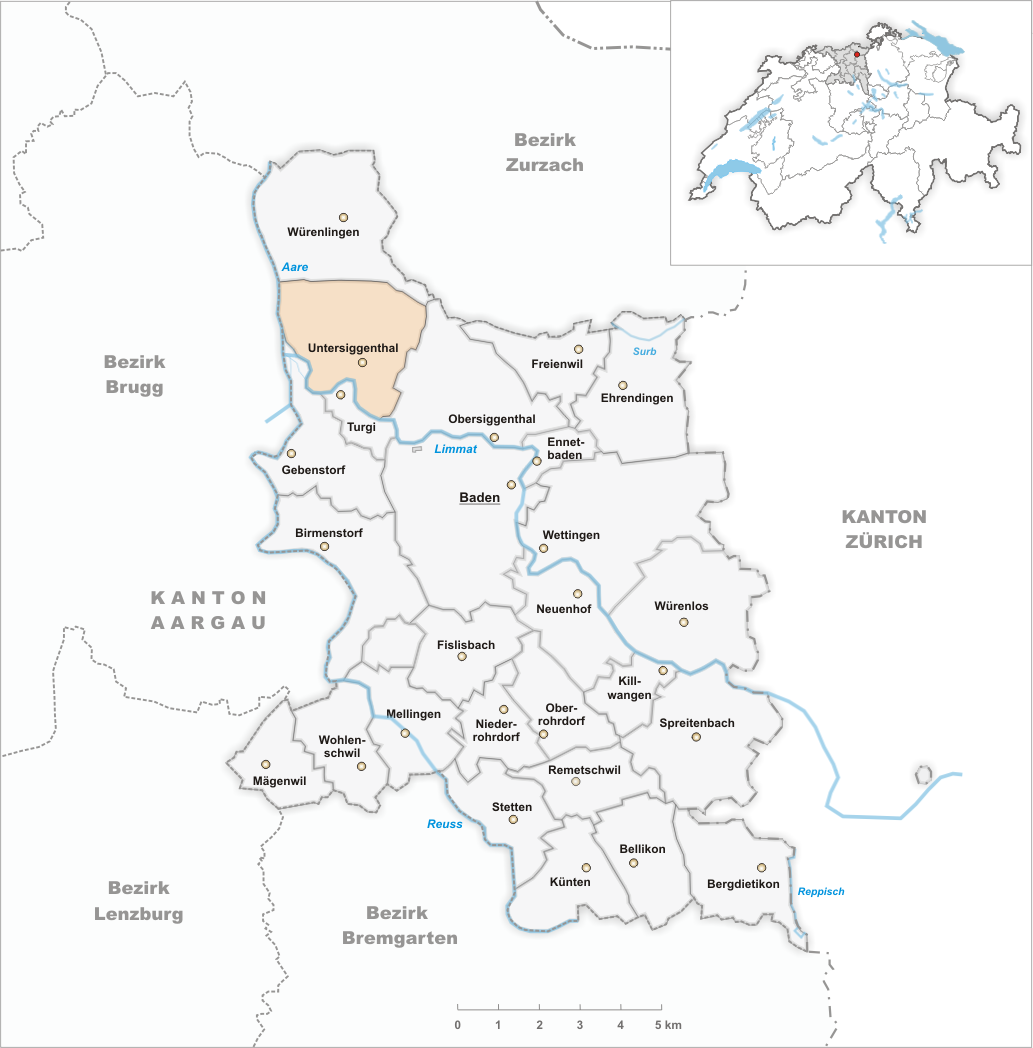
Untersiggenthal

Untersiggenthal is a municipality in the district of Baden in the canton of Aargau in Switzerland, located in the Limmat Valley (German: Limmattal).

== Geography ==
Aerial view (1953)

Untersiggenthal has an area, as of 2006, of 8.3 square kilometers (3.2 sq mi). Of this area, 33.2% is used for agricultural purposes, while 44.3% is forested. Of the rest of the land, 18.8% is settled (buildings or roads) and the remainder (3.8%) is non-productive (rivers or lakes).

== Coat of arms ==
The blazon of the municipal coat of arms is Gules two Keys in saltire Argent.

== Demographics ==
Untersiggenthal has a population (as of 31 December 2020) of 7,229. As of 2008, 26.1% of the population was made up of foreign nationals. Over the last 10 years the population has grown at a rate of 10.9%. Most of the population (as of 2000) speaks German (82.9%), with Italian being second most common ( 3.6%) and Albanian being third ( 2.8%).

The age distribution, as of 2008, in Untersiggenthal is; 685 children or 10.7% of the population are between 0 and 9 years old and 766 teenagers or 11.9% are between 10 and 19. Of the adult population, 842 people or 13.1% of the population are between 20 and 29 years old. 856 people or 13.3% are between 30 and 39, 1,056 people or 16.4% are between 40 and 49, and 888 people or 13.8% are between 50 and 59. The senior population distribution is 746 people or 11.6% of the population are between 60 and 69 years old, 371 people or 5.8% are between 70 and 79, there are 183 people or 2.8% who are between 80 and 89, and there are 31 people or 0.5% who are 90 and older.

As of 2000, there were 240 homes with 1 or 2 persons in the household, 1,226 homes with 3 or 4 persons in the household, and 864 homes with 5 or more persons in the household. The average number of people per household was 2.45 individuals. In 2008 there were 1,048 single family homes (or 38.2% of the total) out of a total of 2,740 homes and apartments. There were a total of 58 empty apartments for a 2.1% vacancy rate. As of 2007, the construction rate of new housing units was 4.9 new units per 1000 residents.

In the 2007 federal election the most popular party was the SVP which received 35% of the vote. The next three most popular parties were the SP (19.2%), the CVP (15.7%) and the FDP (13.7%).

In Untersiggenthal about 74.9% of the population (between age 25-64) have completed either non-mandatory upper secondary education or additional higher education (either university or a Fachhochschule). Of the school age population (in the 2008/2009 school year), there are 448 students attending primary school, there are 211 students attending secondary school in the municipality.

The historical population is given in the following table:

Historical population
Year	Pop.	±%
1975	4,155	—
1980	4,588	+10.4%
1990	5,338	+16.3%
2000	6,092	+14.1%

== Heritage sites of national significance ==
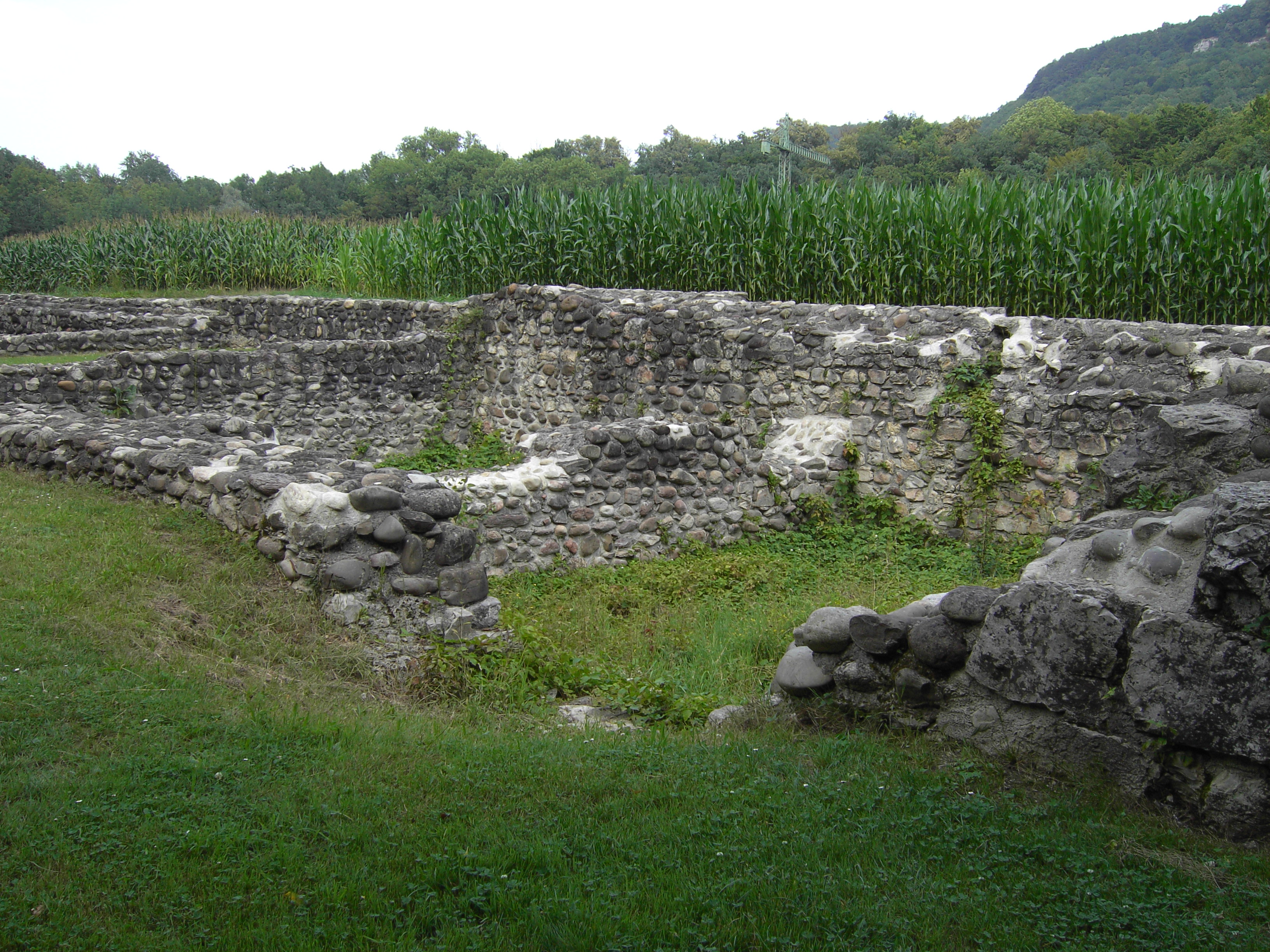
Ruins of Freudenau castle

The ruined Freudenau castle and the Neolithic/Bronze Age settlement at Heidenküche are listed as Swiss heritage sites of national significance.

== Economy ==
As of 2007, Untersiggenthal had an unemployment rate of 2.79%. As of 2005, there were 67 people employed in the primary economic sector and about 17 businesses involved in this sector. 399 people are employed in the secondary sector and there are 40 businesses in this sector. 748 people are employed in the tertiary sector, with 103 businesses in this sector.

As of 2000 there were 3,210 total workers who lived in the municipality. Of these, 2,713 or about 84.5% of the residents worked outside Untersiggenthal while 483 people commuted into the municipality for work. There were a total of 980 jobs (of at least 6 hours per week) in the municipality. Of the working population, 24.8% used public transportation to get to work, and 46.9% used a private car.

Parts of Untersiggenthal and Brugg areas are heated by the Refuna nuclear district heating system since 1984.

== Religion ==
From the 2000 census, 2,919 or 47.6% are Roman Catholic, while 1,727 or 28.2% belonged to the Swiss Reformed Church. Of the rest of the population, there are 5 individuals (or about 0.08% of the population) who belong to the Christian Catholic faith.
