= Gebenstorf =

- Municipality
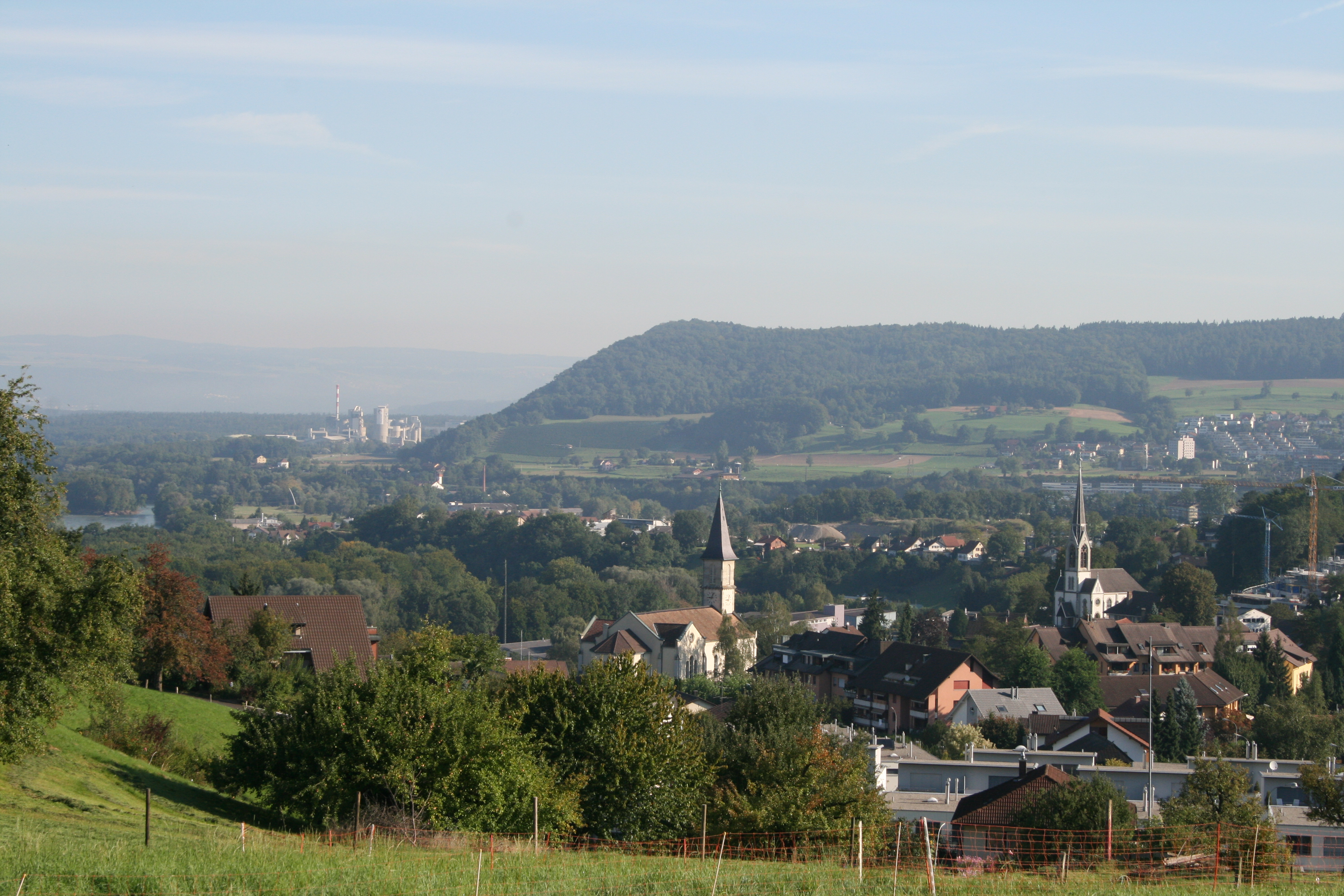

- Flag Coat of arms
- Location of Gebenstorf
- Location within Switzerland Location within Canton of Aargau
- Coordinates: 47°29′N 8°14′E
- Country: Switzerland
- Canton: Aargau
- District: Baden

Area
  - Total: 5.64 km^{2} (2.18 sq mi)
- Elevation: 375 m (1,230 ft)
- Highest elevation (Chörnlisberg): 561 m (1,841 ft)
- Lowest elevation (Confluence of Aar and Limmat): 330 m (1,080 ft)

Population (December 2020)
  - Total: 5,514
  - Density: 978/km^{2} (2,530/sq mi)
- Time zone: UTC+01:00 (CET)
  - Summer (DST): UTC+02:00 (CEST)
- Postal code: 5412
- SFOS number: 4029
- ISO 3166 code: CH-AG
- Localities: Vogelsang
- Surrounded by: Baden, Birmenstorf, Brugg, Turgi, Untersiggenthal, Windisch
- Website: gebenstorf.ch

Gebenstorf is a municipality in the district of Baden in the canton of Aargau in Switzerland.

Aerial view (1965)

== History ==
Gebenstorf is first mentioned in 1247 as Gobistorf. From 1415 until 1798 it was a township in the county of Baden. The historical borders have been retained in the modern municipality.

== Geography ==
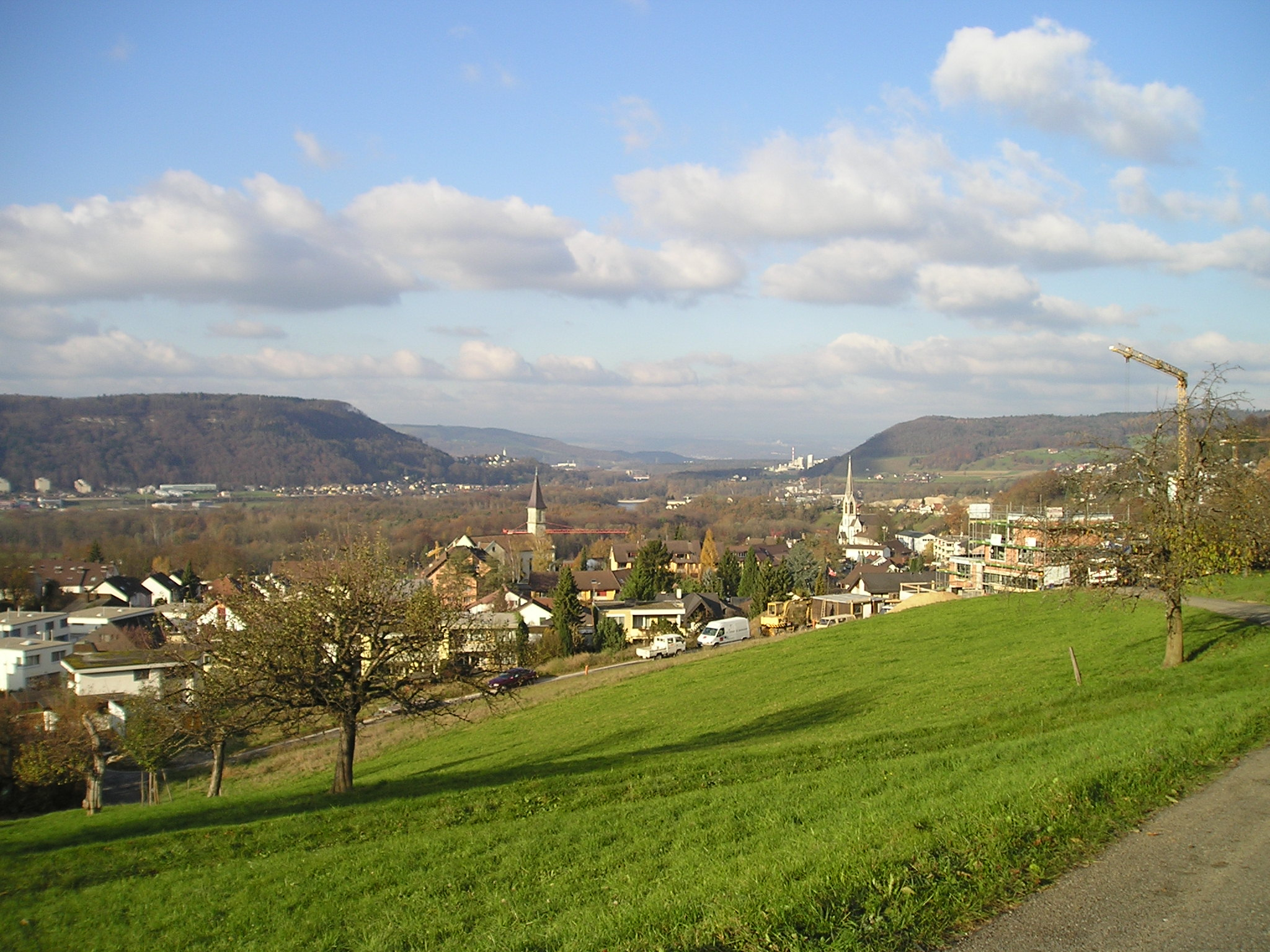
View of Gebenstorf from North

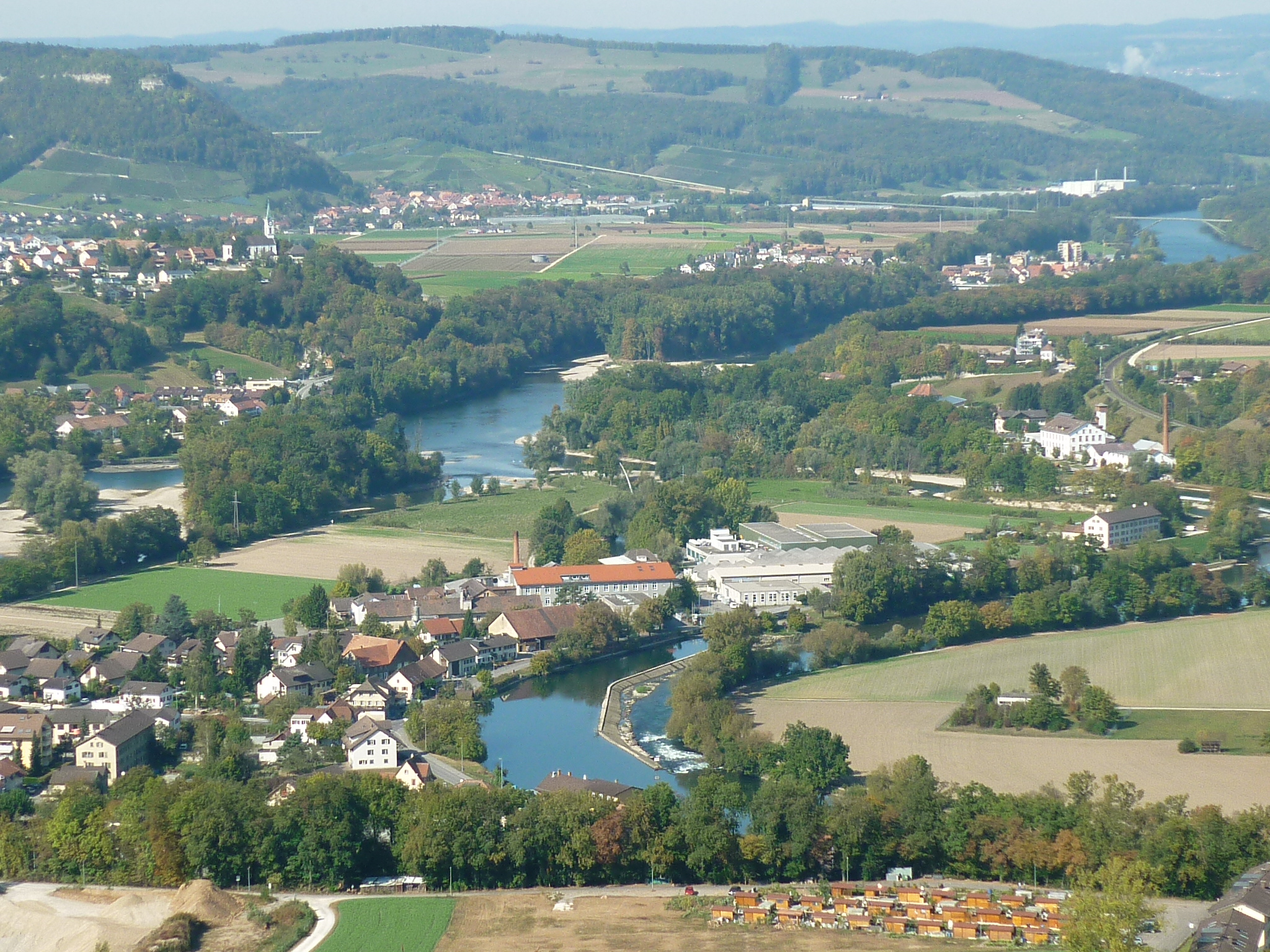
View of Vogelsang

Gebenstorf has an area, as of 2006, of 5.7 km^{2} (2.2 sq mi). Of this area, 29% is used for agricultural purposes, while 41.6% is forested. Of the rest of the land, 24.4% is settled (buildings or roads) and the remainder (5%) is non-productive (rivers or lakes).

The municipality is located in the Baden district, at the confluence of the Reuss and Limmat rivers into the Aare river. It consists of the villages of Gebenstorf and Vogelsang and the hamlets of Reuss, Petersberg and Schwabenberg. In 1884, the village of Wil and the factory center of Turgi separated from Gebenstorf to form an independent municipality.

== Coat of arms ==
The blazon of the municipal coat of arms is Per pale Gules a Sickle Argent and Argent a Ploughshare Gules.

== Demographics ==
Gebenstorf has a population (as of 31 December 2020) of 5,514. As of 2008, 26.9% of the population was made up of foreign nationals. Over the last 10 years the population has grown at a rate of 5.8%. Most of the population (as of 2000) speaks German (83.3%), with Italian being second most common ( 4.8%) and Albanian being third ( 2.3%).

The age distribution, as of 2008, in Gebenstorf is; 409 children or 8.9% of the population are between 0 and 9 years old and 510 teenagers or 11.1% are between 10 and 19. Of the adult population, 651 people or 14.1% of the population are between 20 and 29 years old. 637 people or 13.8% are between 30 and 39, 759 people or 16.5% are between 40 and 49, and 700 people or 15.2% are between 50 and 59. The senior population distribution is 502 people or 10.9% of the population are between 60 and 69 years old, 308 people or 6.7% are between 70 and 79, there are 122 people or 2.6% who are between 80 and 89, and there are 13 people or 0.3% who are 90 and older.

As of 2000, there were 176 homes with 1 or 2 persons in the household, 885 homes with 3 or 4 persons in the household, and 628 homes with 5 or more persons in the household. The average number of people per household was 2.42 individuals. In 2008 there were 698 single family homes (or 33.3% of the total) out of a total of 2,093 homes and apartments.

In the 2007 federal election the most popular party was the SVP which received 33.7% of the vote. The next three most popular parties were the SP (19.9%), the CVP (14.3%) and the FDP (12.2%).

The entire Swiss population is generally well educated. In Gebenstorf about 72.9% of the population (between age 25–64) have completed either non-mandatory upper secondary education or additional higher education (either university or a Fachhochschule). Of the school age population (in the 2008/2009 school year), there are 284 students attending primary school, there are 138 students attending secondary school in the municipality.

The historical population is given in the following table:

Historical population
Year	Pop.	±%
1798	630	—
1880	2,435	+286.5%
1888	1,570	−35.5%
1900	1,574	+0.3%
1950	2,110	+34.1%
1990	4,079	+93.3%
2000	4,182	+2.5%

^a not including Turgi and Wil

== Economy ==
As of 2007, Gebenstorf had an unemployment rate of 2.53%. As of 2005, there were 54 people employed in the primary economic sector and about 16 businesses involved in this sector. 229 people are employed in the secondary sector and there are 48 businesses in this sector. 611 people are employed in the tertiary sector, with 116 businesses in this sector.

As of 2000 there were 2,281 total workers who lived in the municipality. Of these, 1,904 or about 83.5% of the residents worked outside Gebenstorf while 415 people commuted into the municipality for work. There were a total of 792 jobs (of at least 6 hours per week) in the municipality.

== Religion ==
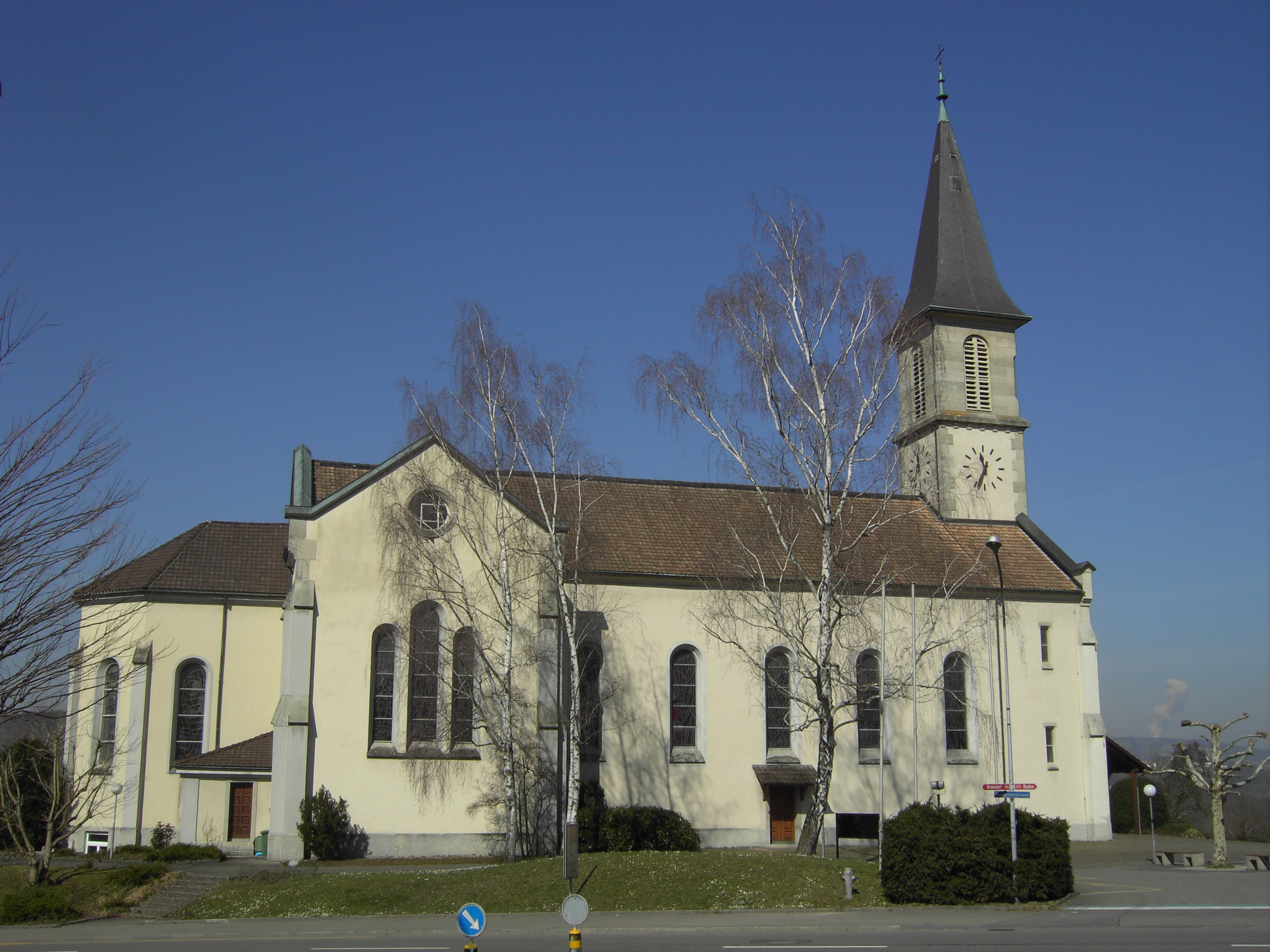
Roman Catholic Church

From the 2000 census, 1,700 or 40.7% are Roman Catholic, while 1,430 or 34.2% belonged to the Swiss Reformed Church. Of the rest of the population, there are 5 individuals (or about 0.12% of the population) who belong to the Christian Catholic faith.
