= Marquesa del Ter =

French pianist and feminist (1864 – 1936)

Lilly Rose Cabrera Marquesa del Ter y Condesa de Morella
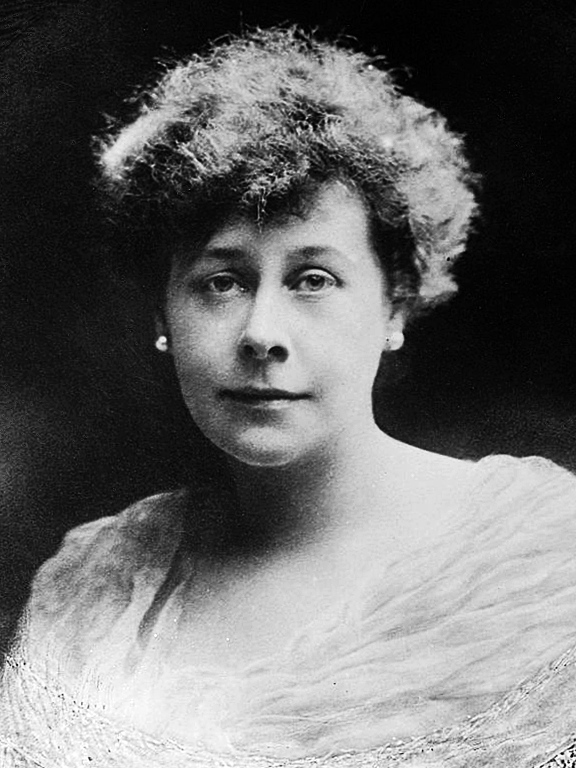
- Born: Lilly Rose Schenrich; 1864; Paris, France
- Died: 29 April 1936 (aged 71–72); London, England
- Other names: Marquesa del Ter, Lily Rose Cabrera
- Occupations: pianist, social worker, women's right activist
- Years active: 1914–1938

Lilly Rose Cabrera, Marquise of Ter and Countess of Morella (1864 – 29 April 1936), known as the Marquesa del Ter, was a pianist and feminist who founded one of the first feminist organizations in Spain and was the wife of 2nd Marquis of Ter and 2nd Count of Morella, Ramón Cabrera y Richards. Born in Paris, she was awarded the Gold Médaille de la Reconnaissance française for her work with hospitals during World War I.

== Biography ==
Lilly Rose Schenrich was born in 1864 in Paris to Julia Elizabeth (née Spuring) and Henri Joseph Schenrich. She married Ramón Alejandro Leopoldo Cabrera y Richards (1854–1940) on 23 October 1884, at the French Catholic Chapel on Little George Street, Marylebone, London. Her husband was a diplomat and ten years her senior. In 1889, the couple's only son, Ramón Henry was born in London. They divided their time primarily between London and Madrid though at various times he was posted briefly in Washington, D.C., St. Petersburg (1901) and Morocco (1921-1922), where the Marquesa spent three months during the worst part of the bombardment of Melilla a witness to the heavy Spanish losses.

The Marquesa was a pianist and appeared in theaters in England, France, and Spain. She also was an accomplished linguist, fluent in English, French and Spanish, and spoke German and Italian. In 1914, at the start of World War I, the Marquesa founded the humanitarian organization Society for the Assistance of Allied Hospitals to provide supplies to 500 military hospitals in France. She also collected clothing and supplies for hospitals in Belgium and Salonica, Greece. The organization provided 110 ambulances and 300 men to lend aid during the war. For her work with the Red Cross, she received the Gold Médaille de la Reconnaissance française from the French Government.

At the end of the 1920s, her husband's mother died and the couple returned to Spain with their son. There, the Marquesa joined the suffrage movement and founded one of the first feminist organizations in Spain, Unión de Mujeres de España (UME) (Women's Union of Spain) on 24 December 1918. She wrote on feminist issues and her photograph was the cover portrait for the magazine "Voice of Women", issue 21, in January 1919. Though it was short lived, the Marquesa founded a feminist journal called Renacimiento. She challenged Spanish laws which deprived women of acting without their husband's consent, those that forced women to take the citizenship of their husband upon marriage and statutes that gave husbands full guardianship over children. The Women's Union was staunchly in favor of women's education, which was ignored for all classes of society at the time. Though she tried to use her contacts with royalty, appealing directly to Queen consort Victoria Eugenie of Battenberg she met with little success and frequently lamented in the press the slow progress being made in Spain.

“Body and soul, we women are only slaves. The married actress can’t even sign a contract without her husband’s consent. The widow can’t take a flat without the aid of a male relative. And in the family council we are entirely ignored. We can’t even open a bank account, nor touch an inheritance, nor choose the teachers of our own children. Our dowries pass to our husbands the moment we marry. I may have a million a year of my own, but as a wife I must needs go to my husband for every dollar I want. Is this just or fair in 1921?”

The Marquesa del Ter addressing the Queen of Spain, quoted by the New York Times Book Review and Magazine (1 May 1921)

Because of her extensive knowledge of language and international affairs, the Marquesa was selected as the Spanish delegate to the 1920 International Alliance Congress of Women’s Suffrage held in Geneva, Switzerland. She spoke as the Spanish representative at the Union des Femmes de France in Paris, at the Paris International Congress of 1926, and then in 1927 at the Women's International Alliance Congress for Peace, in Amsterdam. During the collection of materials on international law and their impact on women's citizenship, undertaken by Doris Stevens and Alice Paul for the Pan American Union and League of Nations, the Marquesa was one of the feminists who assisted the duo in their efforts to compile information on the laws of each country. The report would ultimately lead to the first international agreement ever adopted concerning women's rights, albeit only for member states of the Pan American Union.

She founded the National Council of Spanish women, served as vice-president of the Crusade of Spanish Women, and was a member of the Iberian Society of Natural Sciences and the Royal Madrid Economic Society.

After several years in Spain, the couple returned to London, where the Marquesa died on 29 April 1936, and was buried on 2 May 1936 at Windsor Cemetery. Posthumously, her music collection of 30 volumes was presented to the National Library of Portugal. The collection contained music for voice and piano sonatas featuring Beethoven, Haydn and several French composers. A historical novel, written by Isabel Lizarraga called Cándida in 2012 recounts the stories of early Spanish feminists and includes depictions of the Marquesa.
