= Tamara Sedmak =

Swiss television presenter, model and actress (born 1976)

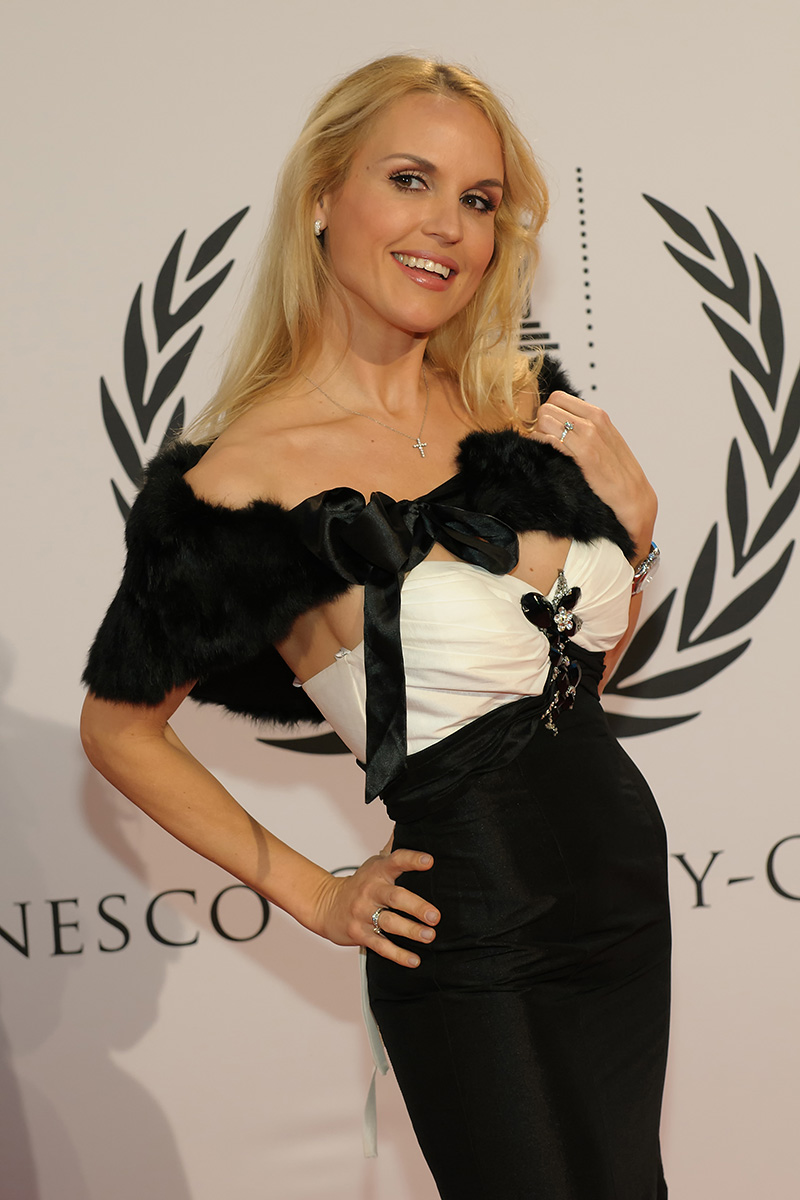
- Tamara Sedmak at the 2012 UNESCO Gala
- Born: 30 June 1976 (age 49); Baden, Aargau, Switzerland
- Occupation(s): Television presenter, model
- Years active: 1995–present
- Television: Star TV (1999–2001); N-tv (2001–2002); N24 (2004–2006); Premiere (2006–2008)
- Website: www.tamarasedmak.com

Tamara Sedmak (born 30 June 1976) is a Swiss television presenter and former model.

== Early life and education ==
Tamara Sedmak was born in Baden in the canton of Aargau and spent her childhood in Obersiggenthal near Baden. In 1996, she graduated at the cantonal school of Baden with a Type B Matura. She then studied journalism, business economics and psychology at the University of Zurich. In 2001, she ended her studies graduating with a licenciate in philosophy.

== Television career ==
Sedmak began her career on television in 1995 as a presenter at the Zürcher Party and on the youth channel Sputnik TV for one year. From October 1999 to October 2001, she was a member of the editorial and presentation team on the programs Freestyle, Fashion and True Hollywood Stories at the Zurich local channel Star TV. In 2001, she was a presenter for the traveling program Gipfelstürmer on German channel N-tv for one year. In 2002, she was a news editor on the radio station Energy Zürich. From August 2004 to March 2006, she presented the weather during the Sat.1 news on the German channel N24. In April 2006, she began presenting the programs Premiere Kino, Premiere Entertainment and Premiere Inside on Premiere (renamed Sky Deutschland since July 2009). From May 2007 to January 2008, she hosted the premiere service program titled HD perfekt on the same channel.

== Modeling titles ==
- 1991 : Winner of the "Concours Mannequin" in Paris
- 1999–2000 : Nominated Miss Switzerland by the audience

== Personal life ==
Sedmak speaks German, English, French, Italian and Croatian, and has also presented programs and events in these languages. She has also been actively practicing ballet since her youth, as well as tennis, skiing and swimming.

Sedmak was married to German former athlete and sports presenter Norbert Dobeleit, with whom she has a son named Julius born in June 2011. The couple has separated since. In August 2016, she gave birth to her second child, a daughter named Jasmin, from a relationship with a New York businessman.
