= Harriet Rice =

African-American physician (1869–1958)

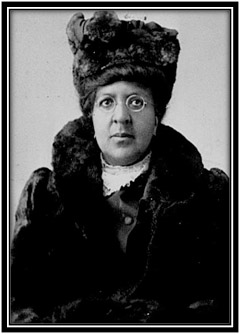
- Rice in 1916
- Born: 1866; Newport, Rhode Island, United States
- Died: 1958 (aged 91–92); Worcester, Massachusetts, United States
- Education: Wellesley College; New York Infirmary for Indigent Women and Children
- Years active: 1891–1958

Harriett Alleyne Rice (1866–1958) was the first African American to graduate from Wellesley College. During World War I, Dr. Rice served with the Service de Santé, the French Medical Corps. She was awarded the Medal of French Gratitude for her medical service.

== Early life ==
Rice was one of four children born to George Addison Rice and Lucinda Webster Rice. The family owned their own home in Newport, Rhode Island. Her father worked as a steamer steward, and her older brother, George Rice II, also became a physician.

Rice graduated from Rogers High School, an integrated public school in Newport, in 1882. She was reportedly the highest scoring student in her class in the subject of Greek.

== Career ==
Rice was the first African-American graduate from Wellesley College in 1887. After attending University of Michigan medical school for a year from 1888 to 1889, she suffered a severe fall and had to return home for treatment. Later, she obtained her MD in 1891 from the Women's Medical College of the New York Infirmary for Women and Children. However, as an African American woman in this era, she was unable to practice medicine in any American hospital, and so she joined the social worker and suffragist leader Jane Addams at Hull House in Chicago, where she provided medical treatment for the poor. In 1897, she joined Chicago Maternity Hospital and Training School for Nursery Maids as the only doctor. When World War I broke out, Rice traveled to France and practiced as a medical intern at a hospital in Poitiers, staying for almost four years. For this she was recognized by the French Embassy and awarded the Medal of French Gratitude.

She died in Worcester, Massachusetts in 1958 and is buried in Newport's Common Burying Ground.
