= Medal of French Gratitude =

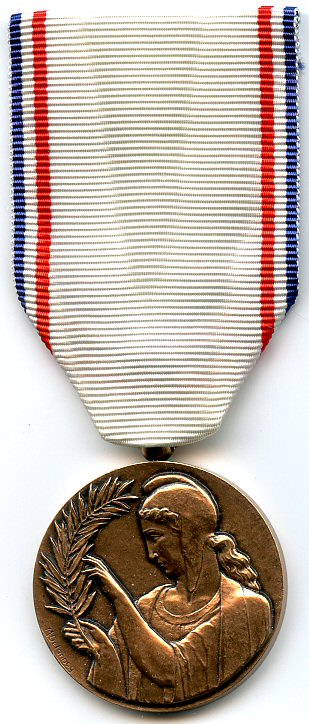
- Bronze level, type 2 (obverse)
- Type: Three grade medal
- Awarded for: Support to the victims of war
- Presented by: France
- Status: No longer awarded
- Established: 13 July 1917

Highlights
- Total recipients: ~15,000
- Gold Silver Bronze

Precedence
- Next (higher): Combatant's Cross
- Next (lower): Overseas Medal

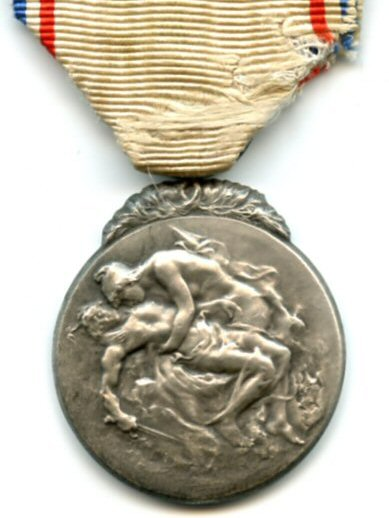
Type 1 silver grade award (obverse)

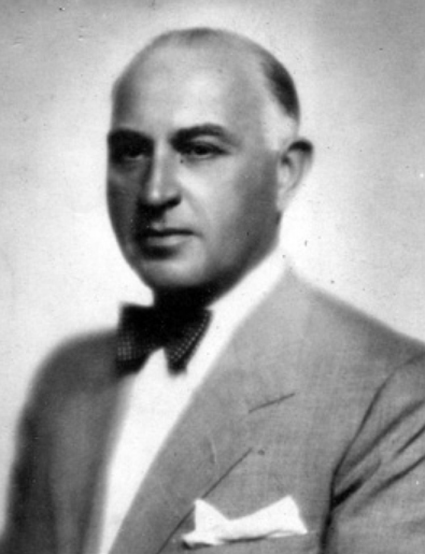
Resistance fighter Albert Kohan, a recipient of the Medal of French Gratitude

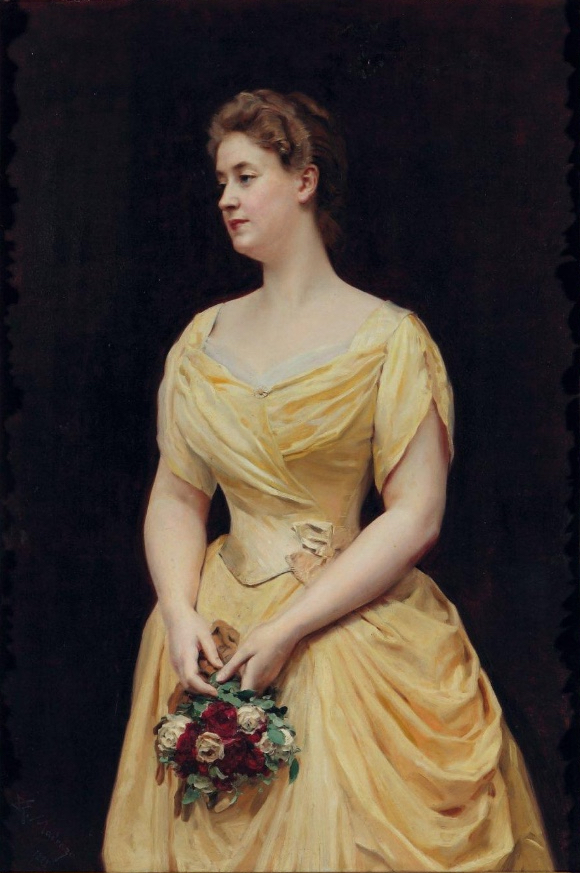
American philanthropist Ellen Ridgway, a recipient of the Medal of French Gratitude

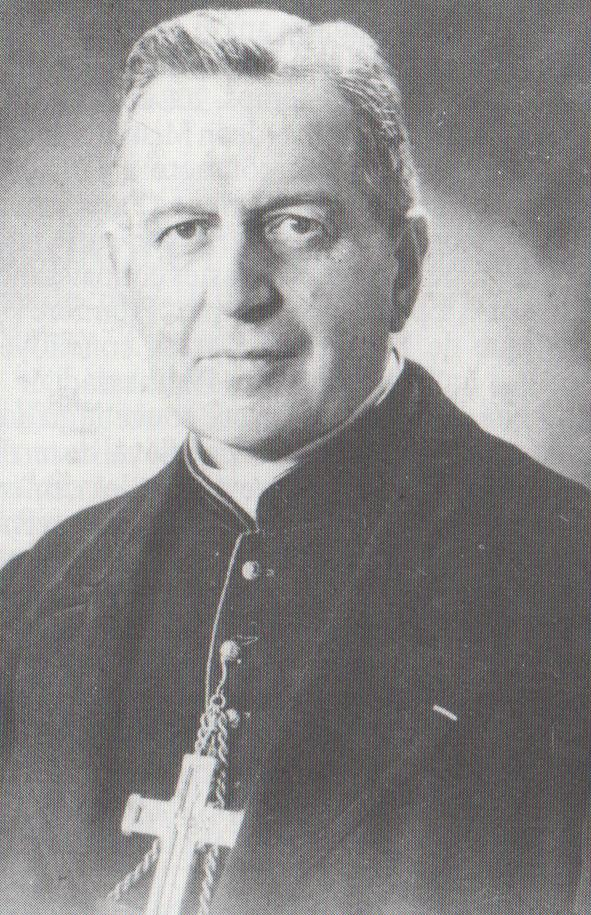
Father Émile Blanchet, a recipient of the Medal of French Gratitude

The Medal of French Gratitude (French: "Médaille de la Reconnaissance française") was a French honour medal created on 13 July 1917 and solely awarded to civilians. The medal was created to express gratitude by the French government to all those who, without legal or military obligation, had come to the aid of the injured, disabled, refugees, or who had performed an act of exceptional dedication in the presence of the enemy during the First World War. The creation of this distinction was mainly the result of unsuccessful offensives of General Nivelle in 1917 and the serious crisis of confidence in France. The French government thus wanted to thank those who, despite the crisis, were always volunteering. It has three classes: bronze, silver, and gold. Nearly 15,000 people and communities were recipients of this award. The medal is no longer awarded, the last award was on 14 February 1959.

== Award statute ==
The Medal of French Gratitude was awarded following World War I to the following:

- Persons who, in the presence of the enemy, have performed acts of exceptional dedication, the duration of these services having spanned one year (Decree of December 2, 1917)
- Deserving communities (whose members were are not allowed to wear the ribbon or individual medal by decree of December 2, 1917);
- Citizens of Alsace-Lorraine who were deported, exiled or imprisoned, before 1 August 1914, by German authorities because of their attachment to France and those in the departments occupied themselves, for their courageous stand while exposed to reprisals (Decree of 1 April 1922);
- Prisoners of war, civilian prisoners, hostages and deportees because of exceptional acts courage and dedication for the allied cause. The inhabitants of occupied areas or Alsace and Lorraine who helped these people (decrees of 29 November 1926 and December 8, 1928).

== Award description ==
The first model was a 30 mm in diameter circular bronze, silver or gilded medal depending on the level of the award, the design was by engraver Jules Desbois. The obverse bore charity personified by France supporting a wounded soldier. On the reverse at centre, the relief circular inscription "RECONNAISSANCE FRANÇAISE" along the circumference with at centre and a palm leaf on the right.

The second model is a 32 mm in diameter circular bronze, silver or gilded medal depending on the level of the award, the design was by engraver Maurice Delannoy. The obverse bears a woman wearing a Phrygian cap representing France offering a palm. On the reverse, the relief inscription RECONNAISSANCE FRANÇAISE around a wreath of roses surrounding an escutcheon bearing the initials "RF" (for République Française).

The medal hung from a 37 mm wide white silk moiré ribbon with tricolour 2 mm wide edge stripes of blue, white and red, the blue being outermost.

== Notable recipients (partial list) ==
=== French citizens ===
- Father Émile Blanchet
- Politician Raoul Bleuse
- Herminie de La Brousse de Verteillac, Princesse of Léon
- Doctor Alfred Cerné
- Suzanne Desprès
- Doctor Léandre Dupré
- Politician Charles Ehrmann
- Resistance fighter Charles Fenain
- Marquise Corisande de Gramont
- Paul-Jacques Kalb
- Lawyer Pierre Kédinger
- General Marie-Pierre Kœnig
- Resistance fighter Albert Kohan
- Writer Camille Marbo
- Resistance member Paul Rassinier
- Resistance member Eric Reach

=== Foreign nationals ===
- Ettie Rout, for her safe sex work among the Allied troops during World War I New Zealand
- Samuel Beckett, for his secretarial work with the Resistance cell known as 'Gloria SMH' Ireland
- Lucile Atcherson Curtis, diplomat United States
- Barbara Borsinger, nurse Switzerland
- Prince Boun Oum Laos
- Alan Burns, 4th Baron Inverclyde United Kingdom
- Marquesa del Ter Spain
- James Michael Curley, mayor of Boston, United States
- Louis Dewis, activist on behalf of Belgians during World War I and noted landscape artist Belgium
- Charlotte Fairbanks, surgeon United States
- Perrin Comstock Galpin, served with Herbert Hoover in Belgian food relief immediately after World War I United States
- Mary Frances Crowley, for her work at Saint-Lô Ireland
- Marie Galway United Kingdom
- Ethel Gray, nurse Australia
- Julia Green Scott, philanthropist United States
- Catherine Haviland United States
- Amelia Hetherington Australia
- Lotta Hitschmanova Canada
- Aline Rhonie Hofheimer, pilot United States
- Charlotte Kellogg United States
- John Adams Kingsbury, assistant director of general relief, American Red Cross, France United States
- Helen Kirkpatrick, war correspondent United States
- Tracy Barrett Kittredge, Captain commissioned through the Naval Reserve Officer Training Corps United States
- Anna Elizabeth Klumpke, artist United States
- Louisa Sharpe Metcalf United States
- Rachel Gertrude Moseley MM, First Aid Nursing Yeomanry FANY, ambulance driver 1918 United Kingdom
- Louise Mountbatten United Kingdom nurse with British Red Cross, an aunt of Prince Philip, Duke of Edinburgh, later Queen of Sweden Sweden
- Decima Moore United Kingdom
- Nagako Nabeshima Japan
- Norman Holmes Pearson United States
- Vere Ponsonby, 9th Earl of Bessborough United Kingdom
- Harriet Rice, Doctor United States
- Harold Ross, journalist who co-founded The New Yorker magazine in 1925 United States
- Hunter Scarlett United States
- Helen Sexton, surgeon Australia
- Belle Skinner, philanthropist United States
- Alfa Tofft, Save the Children after WW II Denmark
- Frank A. Vanderlip, banker and journalist United States
- Mariana Griswold Van Rensselaer, president of the American Fund for French Wounded, New York Committee United States

== Communities decorated ==
The Medal of French Gratitude was awarded to six French and eight foreign cities.

=== French cities ===
- Annemasse, Thonon and Evian 1921
- Céret 1946
- Cerbère and Hochfelden 1947

=== Foreign cities ===
- Schaffhausen (1919), Basel, Geneva and Lausanne (1921), Montreux (1953). Switzerland
- Mons (1920). Belgium
- Luxembourg (1921). Luxembourg
- Narvik (1954). Norway

== See also ==
- World War I
- German occupation of north-east France during World War I
- Ribbons of the French military and civil awards
