= List of mayors of Baden, Switzerland =

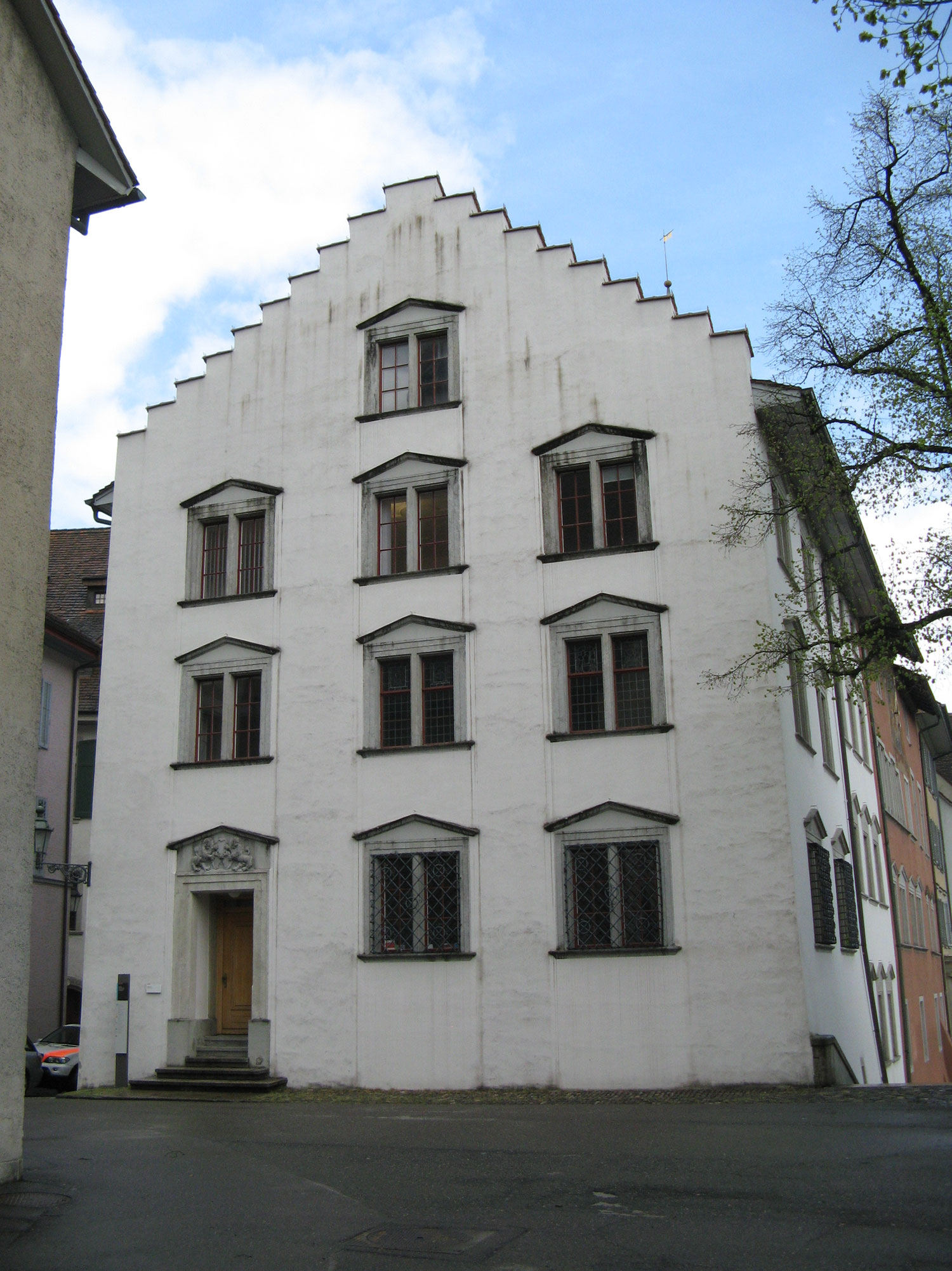
Stadtkanzlei, Baden

Coat of arms of Baden

This is a list of mayors (Stadtammann) of Baden, Aargau, Switzerland.

Mayor (Stadtammann) of Baden
| Term | Mayor | Lifespan | Party | Notes |
|---|---|---|---|---|
| 1832–1837 | Kaspar Joseph Borsinger | (1801–1859) | | |
| 1838–1842 | Joseph Ludwig Baldinger | | | |
| 1842–1852 | Johann Ulrich Hanauer | (1807–1871) | | |
| 1853–1862 | Friedrich Joseph Bürli | (1813–1889) | | |
| 1863–1881 | Joseph Zehnder | (1810–1896) | | |
| 1881–1893 | Armin Kellersberger | (1838–1905) | | |
| 1894–1901 | Carl Pfister | (1847–1931) | | |
| 1901–1910 | Arnold Reisse | | | |
| 1910–1927 | Joseph Jäger | (1852–1927) | | |
| 1927–1948 | Karl Killer | (1878–1948) | SPS/PSS | |
| 1948–1973 | Max Müller | (1907–1987) | | |
| 1973–1985 | Victor Rickenbach | (born 1928) | | |
| 1985–2006 | Josef Bürge | (born 1941) | | |
| 2006–2012 | Stephan Attiger | (born 1967) | FDP/PRD | |
| 2013–2017 | Geri Müller | (born 1960) | GPS | |
| 2017-today | Markus Schneider | | die Mitte | |
