= Barbara Borsinger =

Swiss nurse (1892-1973)

- Born: Barbara Borsinger; 1892; Baden, Switzerland
- Died: 8 September 1972 (aged 79–80); Castle of Horben, Aargau
- Known for: Founder, Nursery of the Friends of Children's Charity (Clinique des Grangettes)

Barbara Borsinger (1892–1973) was a nurse from Baden, Switzerland (Aargau), who was active during World War I and World War II in welcoming children, refugees, injured civilians and victims of the World Wars to Switzerland. She founded the Nursery of the Friends of Children's Charity, which was later known as the Clinique des Grangettes, now a private hospital.

== Biography ==
=== Early life ===
Borsinger was born to a Catholic family which owned a motel business. She and her sister, Verena-Hildegarde, attended a boarding school in Riedenburg. She continued her education at the Sacred Heart Church on the Isle of Wight, in Great Britain. Between 1911 and 1914, she studied to become a nurse in Geneva, at the school of Bon-Secours. When World War I was declared, she volunteered to help the wounded on the French front lines. She then served as the chief nurse, at the Dinard Hospital until 1920.

=== Career ===
In 1918, the pandemic flu spread in Europe. Geneva was not spared and Barbara Borsinger was deeply affected by the fate of sick children and orphans. As a result, she founded the Nursery of the Friends of Children's Charity, in Carouge, which was dedicated to caring for children who were victims of the pandemic and to training nurses to take care of them.

In 1920, the Nursery of the Friends of Children's Charity was transferred to Malagnou, then to Clos Belmont, and finally to the countryside near Grange Canal on the outskirts of Geneva. In 1933, as the institution extended its services to adults, Borsinger started to build a modern private hospital. She founded the "Pouponnière de L'Oeuvre des Amis de l'Enfance", (Nursery of the Friends of Children's Charity) nicknamed "La Poup", these institutions later became the Clinique des Grangettes, which are still in operation today.

==== World War II ====
In 1943, during the 50th anniversary of the hospital, Borsinger estimated that 6000 babies had been cared for by the 1280 nurses and child workers she had trained. During World War II, as during the First World War, the nursery welcomed many refugees. A contemporary article recalls children were seen sneaking through the borders under barbed wire with a notice around their necks reading: "nursery of Grange-Canal".

=== Notable acquaintances ===
Borsinger directed these institutions in collaboration with two female doctors, Viola von Riederer and Bianca Stiegler, as well as the pediatricians Albert Mégevand and Fred Bamatter. She was acquainted with the writer Robert Musil, whom she met in Nyon at the home of Countess Mary Dobrzensky, a mutual friend.

==== Retirement ====
Borsinger retired because of health issues related to habitual alcohol and tobacco consumption. She gave her institution to the sisters of Menzingen, which had directed the hospital since 1957. The sisters decided, however, to concentrate their work outside Europe, selling the hospital to a group of radiologists in 1978.

She died on 9 August 1972, in Horben Castle in Aargau. For her work during World War I, Borsinger received the Medal of French Gratitude and she was made a Lady of the Order of Queen Elisabeth of Belgium.
