= Mary Frances Crowley =

Irish educator and nurse

- Born: 1 August 1906; Wexford
- Died: 11 March 1990 (aged 83); Dublin

Mary Frances Crowley (1 August 1906– 11 March 1990), was an Irish educator and nurse who founded nursing training schools.

== Biography ==
Mary Frances Crowley was born 1 August 1906 in Wexford, at 12 William Street, the eldest child of John Crowley, a lighthouse keeper, stationed in Hook Head lighthouse at the time, and his wife Emily (née Williams), daughter of a lighthouse keeper. Her father's profession took the family around Ireland both to wherever he was stationed and to other houses for the lighthouse keepers' families while he was stationed in remote locations. Crowley went away to the UK to gain her nursing qualifications from 1931 to 1935. She trained for her State Registered Nursing Certificate in St Catherine's Hospital, Birkenhead and St James's Hospital, Chester (later the Chester City Hospital which closed in 1994.) She then achieved her State Registered Midwifery Certificate, with training from the maternity hospitals in Liverpool and Mile End Hospital in London. Crowley came back to Ireland in 1941 to work in Sir Patrick Dun's Hospital in Dublin. She established an obstetrics nurse and midwifery nursing school in what is now Our Lady of Lourdes Hospital, Drogheda and in 1944 Crowley became the Assistant Matron of the Royal Victoria Eye and Ear Hospital. When World War II ended, Crowley volunteered with the Irish Red Cross Hospital at Saint-Lô as their matron. She and the staff won the Medal of French Gratitude in 1948 for their work. On her return, Crowley began the Nursing Training School at the Eye and Ear hospital and went on to become the Director of Nursing Studies. In 1948 she founded the first ophthalmic nurse training school in Ireland.

Crowley was Honorary secretary of the National Council of the Nurses of Ireland and vice-president of the Irish Guild of Catholic Nurses. Crowley was the founding president of the Nurse Tutor's Academic Society in 1960. She went on to be appointed the first Dean of the Royal College of Surgeons in Ireland (RCSI) Faculty of Nursing in 1974.

Crowley retired in 1980 but remained committed to nursing education. She died in Dublin 11 March 1990 and after a funeral cortège which passed the college to the Newman University Church, St Stephen's Green she was buried in Fingal Cemetery, Balgriffin, County Dublin. The RCSI flew their flag at half mast. In 2019 they commissioned her portrait, which is hanging in the school.

== Bibliography ==
- A Century of Service 1880–1980: The Story of the Development of Nursing in Ireland (1994) - editor
- The Christian Nurse (1979) - author
