= Ethel Gray =

Australian nurse (1876–1962)

Ethel Gray CBE RRC
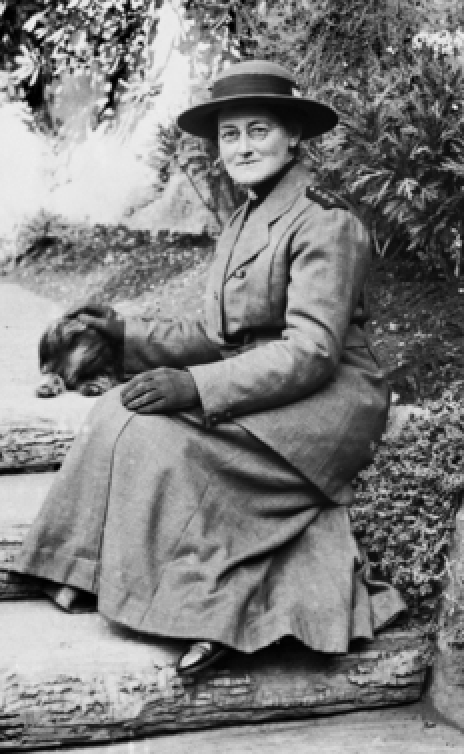
- Matron Ethel Gray in Menton, France, March 1918
- Born: 24 April 1876; Melbourne, Victoria, Australia
- Died: 22 July 1962 (aged 86); Melbourne, Victoria, Australia
- Military career
- Allegiance: Australia
- Branch: Australian Army Nursing Service
- Service years: 1915–1920
- Rank: Matron
- Conflicts: First World War
- Awards: Commander of the Order of the British Empire; Royal Red Cross; Mentioned in Despatches (2); Medal of French Gratitude (France)
- Other work: Matron, Epworth Hospital

Ethel Gray, CBE, RRC (24 April 1876 – 22 July 1962) was an Australian civilian and military nurse. She served in France in the First World War, was appointed a Commander of the Order of the British Empire and awarded the Royal Red Cross and the Medal of French Gratitude.

== Early life ==
Gray was born in Melbourne on 24 April 1876. She was the eldest of the eight children of Samuel Gray, a clothing manufacturer from Cavan, Ireland, and his English-born wife Amelia, née Bird. She attended Lee Street State School in East Melbourne, and the Presbyterian Ladies' College. In March 1900, she entered Melbourne Hospital as a nursing probationer. She gained her certificate on 12 March 1903 and was promoted to the position of staff nurse two days later, followed by another promotion to the position of sister on 29 May.

== Nursing career ==
In 1908 Gray left Melbourne Hospital and was appointed matron at the Queen's Memorial Infectious Diseases Hospital. The following year she returned to Melbourne Hospital as house matron and two years later, in 1911, became assistant lady superintendent.

In January 1913, Gray became matron of Perth Hospital. In February 1915, Gray enlisted in the Australian Army Nursing Service, and ten days later left for England. When she arrived in England she found that the mansion which had been offered for use as a hospital, Harefield Park House in Middlesex, had not been prepared and was not ready to be used. She was required to advise on all necessary alterations, equipment and furniture to make the buildings capable of holding convalescent patients. Over the coming years, Gray managed the growth of the hospital from 150 to 1000 beds.

In December 1916 Gray was transferred to No. 2 Australian General Hospital at Wimereux, France, where she remained until the closure of the hospital in March 1919. In June 1917 she received the Royal Red Cross, 1st class, for her work at Harefield. She was moved back to England and nursed at an Australian General Hospital in Sutton Veny, and was appointed a Commander of the Order of the British Empire in 1919.

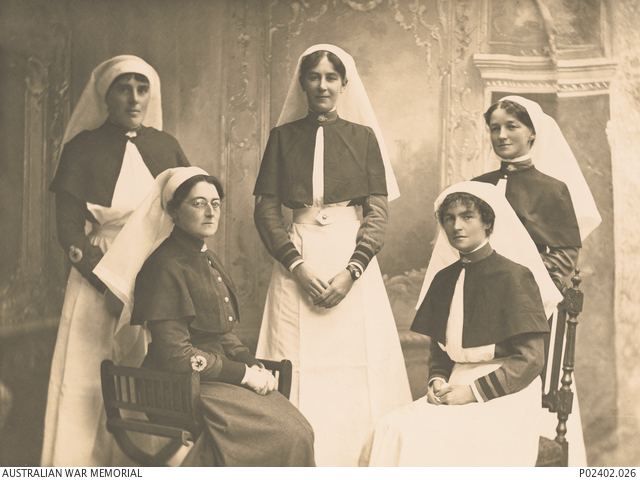
Matron Ethel Gray (seated). The other nurses are Sisters Laura Cumming Pratt (standing, top right); Emily Mills; Helena Chadwick and Marguerite Mills, exact positions unknown.

After she was demobilised, Gray returned to Melbourne and took the position of matron at a new hospital founded by the Methodist Church, Epworth Hospital. In 1926 she was awarded the Medaille de la Reconnaissance Française en bronze. She retired in 1939 and died in Epworth on 22 July 1962.

== Legacy ==
Gray's wartime diaries span the years 1915 to 1919 and include descriptions of visits to her hospitals by dignitaries and royalty, as well as stories of deaths of patients. The originals are held at the Australian War Memorial.

A portrait of Gray by Ernest Buckmaster hangs in Epworth Hospital.
