= Alfa Tofft =

Danish badminton enthusiast and educator

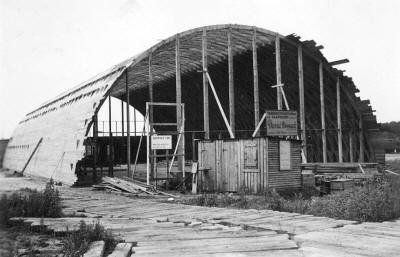
The Aarhus Badminton Hall under construction in 1935

Alfa Tofft (11 January 1911 – 29 July 2004) was a pioneering Danish badminton enthusiast who later became an educator. In 1935, she founded Denmark's first badminton club, Aarhus Badmintonklub. Ten years later, she was a co-founder of Red Barnet, the Danish branch of Save the Children. From 1965 to 1974, she was director of Jydsk Børnehave-Seminarium, a teacher-training establishment for kindergarten teachers.

== Early life and education ==
Born in Copenhagen on 11 January 1911, Alfa Tofft was the daughter of the composer Alfred Tofft (1835–1931) and the singer Elna Bergmann (1875–1933). When she was three years old, her mother went to sing in America but never returned. Alfa and her twin sister Beta were brought up by their father. After attending the Copenhagen Business College, she worked for the music copyright association KODA which was chaired by her father. When she was 21, she went to Canada to study languages at the University of Montreal where she also developed her skills in badminton.

== Professional life ==
On returning to Denmark, she used her inheritance to build Århus Badmintonhal for the Aarhus Badminton Club which she founded in 1935. In so doing, she was the first to bring badminton to Jutland. She ran the club until 1939 when the premises were taken over by the German occupiers. Driven into bankruptcy, she worked for Aarhus Municipality until the end of World War II. Immediately afterwards, she founded Red Barnet, the Danish branch of Save the Children, which in collaboration with the women's support organization Danske Kvinders Beredskab brought thousands of abandoned children to Denmark from the war-swept countries of Europe. Over 5,000 were rehoused in the Aarhus area.

From 1949 to 1951, Tofft was encouraged by Red Barnet to train as a kindergarten teacher as there were plans for her to run a kindergarten in Aarhus. As she was involved in setting up three kindergartens in Copenhagen and Aarhus, her training at the Jydsk Børnehave-Seminarium was not completed until 1954 when she was employed there as a kindergarten teacher. In 1965, she was appointed rector, heading the institution until her retirement in 1974. Tofft is remembered for contributing to the paedagogical side of kindergarten teaching, emphasizing the children's growth and development rather than simply caring for them. At the time, she did not receive much support for her ideas although they were appreciated by her colleagues and students. She was also successful in educating students from Greenland.

Alfa Tofft died in Aarhus on 29 July 2004.

== Awards ==
In 1948, Tofft was awarded the French Medal of French Gratitude and in 1951 the Order of the Star of Italian Solidarity.
