= Bernhard M. Hämmerli =

Swiss computer scientist (born 1958)

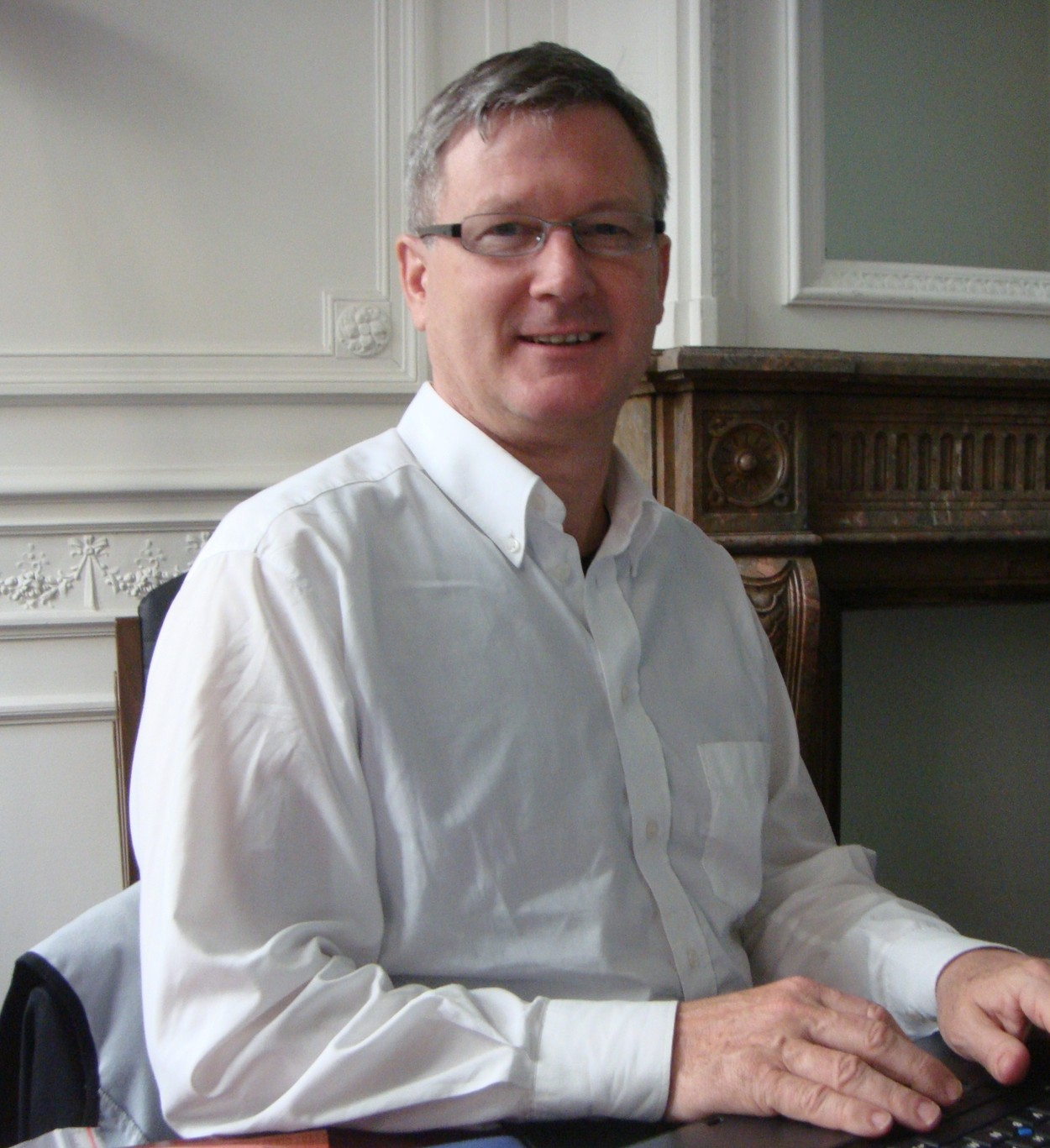
- Hämmerli in 2010
- Born: 31 December 1958 (age 67); Wettingen, Switzerland
- Education: ETH Zurich
- Occupations: Computer scientist; Academic teacher
- Years active: 1992: Lucerne University of Applied Sciences; 2009: Norwegian University of Science and Technology; 2009: President of Swiss Informatics Society
- Known for: Information security; Protection of critical infrastructure

Bernhard M. Hämmerli (born 31 December 1958) is a Swiss computer scientist in the fields of communications, networks, and information security, specifically critical infrastructure protection in the European Union. He is teaching internationally as a professor at both the Lucerne University of Applied Sciences and Norwegian University of Science and Technology. He was president of the Swiss Informatics Society from 2009 to 2014 and chair of the platform ICT Security of the Swiss Academy of Engineering Science from 2012. He has directed a new academic course, Cyber Security, at the Lucerne School of Information Technology from 2018.

== Career ==
Born in Wettingen, Hämmerli studied electrical engineering at the Swiss Federal Institute of Technology and received his Ph.D. in 1988. He worked with the companies IBM, Swissair, and UBS. In 1992 he was appointed professor at the Lucerne University of Applied Sciences (Hochschule Luzern). After teaching micro processors, computer languages (Modula, C, C++) and software engineering. he focused on communications, networks, and information security, as "Professor für Informationssicherheit und Datennetzwerke" (information security and data networks). He held a class in informatics (1992—1999), an executive master program in IT-Security (1998—2001), and a regional Cisco Academy for the Cisco Career Certifications CCNA (from 1998) and CCNP (from 2002). Since 2009, he has been teaching at the Gjøvik University College campus of the Norwegian University of Science and Technology.

Hämmerli served as a consultant for international corporations and worked as an expert in various commissions, especially for the building up the Swiss Information Sharing Centre MELANI and the Swiss Information Operation Working Group. He is member of several scientific and industrial advisory boards and works in program committees of scientific conferences. In 1993, he co-founded the Information Security Society Switzerland (ISSS), and has served on its board, as vice president from 1997 to 2007, then as president to 2009. Hämmerli is also a member of the Societé d’Informaticiens and the IEEE Computer Society, serving on its Press Editorial Board from 2007 to 2012. From 2006 to 2010, he was on the advisory board of IT SEC Swiss. Hämmerli is on the advisory board of the European Homeland Security Association (EHSA). From 2009 to 2014, he was president of the Swiss Informatics Society (SI). In 2012, he was elected to the Swiss Academy of Engineering Science (Schweizerische Akademie der technischen Wissenschaften, SATW), serving as chair of the platform ICT Security.

Hämmerli is the editor of the European Critical Information Infrastructure Protection Newsletter, and an editor of digma, focused on Datenrecht und Informationssicherheit. He was several times a member of international teams for FP7 projects, including Parsifal on "Protection and Trust in Financial Infrastructures".

In 2017, Hämmerli received the Outstanding Achievement Award from the SATW. He became an honorary member of the ISSS in April 2018. Beginning in October 2018, Hämmerli has run a new academic study program Information & Cyber Security at the Lucerne School of Information Technology, then the first such program at a university of applied science in Switzerland.

== Publications ==
- Bernhard M. Hämmerli, Stephen D. Wolthusen: Critical (Information) Infrastructure Protection. GI Jahrestagung (1) 2005: 466-467
- Bernhard M. Hammerli: C(I)IP Task Description and a Proposal for a Substitute of National C(I)IP Policies, Darmstadt, Germany, November 2005, ISBN 0-7695-2426-5
- Bernhard M. Hämmerli, Robin Sommer: Detection of Intrusions and Malware, and Vulnerability Assessment, 4th International Conference, DIMVA 2007, Lucerne, Switzerland, July 12–13, 2007, Proceedings Springer 2007
- Bernhard M. Hämmerli, Henning H. Arendt: Challenges for the Protection of Critical ICT-Based Financial Infrastructures. ISSE 2008: 319-326
- Joachim Biskup, Bernhard M. Hämmerli, Michael Meier, Sebastian Schmerl, Jens Tölle, Michael Vogel: 08102 Working Group -- Early Warning Systems. Network Attack Detection and Defense, 2008
- Bernhard M. Hammerli, Andrea Renda: Protecting Critical Infrastructure in the EU, in: Regulatory Policy, CEPS Task Force Reports, 16 December 2010
