= Bundi (disambiguation) =

Bundi is a city and municipality in Rajasthan, India.

It can also mean:

- Bundi State, former princely state of India
- Bundi Assembly constituency, a state legislative assembly constituency in Rajasthan, India
- Bundi district, of which Bundi is the capital
- Bundi dagger, a type of Indian dagger known as a katar
- Bundi, Papua New Guinea
- Boondi, an Indian snack

== People ==
- Markus Bundi (born 1969), a Swiss writer
