= School of Computing =

School of Computing may refer to:

- School of Computing (Robert Gordon University)
- DIT School of Computing
- NUS School of Computing
- University of Colombo School of Computing
- University of Utah School of Computing
- School of Computing, a school in Federal University of Technology, Akure

== See also ==
- School of Computer Science (disambiguation)
- Computer literacy
