= Christoph Doswald =

Swiss writer (born 1961)

Christoph Doswald (born 1961) is a Swiss publicist, curator und university lecturer.

== Life and work ==
Doswald spent his childhood and youth in Wettingen and his birthplace, Baden. From 1981 to 1989, he studied history, art history and political science at the University of Zurich, interrupted by relatively long stays in Spain and Latin America.

In the mid-1980s, he began to work as a publicist, writing about themes and exhibitions of contemporary art, e.g. for Kunstforum International, Parkett, neue bildende kunst, Artis, Eikon, SonntagsZeitung, Neue Zürcher Zeitung, Weltwoche und Tages-Anzeiger. Under the pseudonym Dr. Kuno, Doswald wrote a weekly lifestyle column from 1991 to 2000, first for SonntagsZeitung, then in Schweizer Illustrierte.

In 1998, together with Monica Glisenti, he conceived the cross-culture magazine "cashual" for the publisher Ringier. This monthly magazine combined artistic and journalistic strategies, e.g. hiring Nan Goldin as a photojournalist and Pipilotti Rist as a model, but was already discontinued after just six issues. From 2002 to 2008, Doswald headed the Society section of the Swiss newspaper SonntagsZeitung.

Together with Paolo Bianchi in 1985/86, Doswald managed a space for ephemeral art projects in their shared flat in Baden – an artist-run space "avant la lettre". In this informal setting, they exhibited the works of befriended artists and organised performances. From 1988 to 1992, Doswald was a member of the board (and chairman on an interim basis) at Zurich's Shedhalle, where curator Harm Lux ran an ambitious exhibition programme, e.g. with projects by Jordi Colomer, Francesca Woodman, Christian Marclay, Sylvie Fleury, Christopher Williams, Pipilotti Rist, Thomas Hirschhorn and Daniele Buetti.

In parallel, from the mid-1980s onwards, Doswald curated exhibitions, e.g. at Kunsthaus Graz, Villa Arson in Nice, Kunstmuseum Bern, Centre Pasquart Biel and the Academy of Arts in Berlin. From 2001 to 2007, he was a member of the "Comité technique", the purchasing committee at Fonds Régional d'Art Contemporain (FRAC PACA) in Marseille, where he realised various exhibitions, e.g. with Ugo Rondinone and Maria Marshall.

Doswald has been the chairman of the City of Zurich's Work Group for Art in Public Spaces (AG KiöR) 2009 until late 2020. He is responsible for the Art in Public Spaces programme and curated ART AND THE CITY (2012), as well as Art Altstetten Albisrieden (2015). The KiöR project zürich – transit – maritim, commonly referred to as "Hafenkran" (harbour crane), attracted a lot of attention. This temporary art intervention at Limmatquai was hotly debated on the Zurich City Council, among the general public and in the media between 2009 and 2016. He has also spoken about art in the public space in lectures, such as "Kampfzone öffentlicher Raum" (Battle Zone Public Space).

Doswald has held various teaching positions and guest professorships, e.g. at the Zurich University of the Arts and at the Stuttgart State Academy of Art and Design, where he replaced Christian Jankowski while Jankowski was curating Manifesta 11 in Zurich. Since 2012, Doswald has been a member of the board at visarte.schweiz, the professional association of Switzerland's visual artists. Here, he is in charge of art-in-architecture and art in the public space. In this role, he launched the Prix Visarte awards. He has been president of the foundation Kulturweg Limmat since 2016.] In 2023 he curated, together with Swizz curator Paolo Bianchi, „Landscapes of Desire“, the 4th Industrial Art Biennale (IAB) in Labin, Raša, Pula and Rijeka (Croatia).

In 2026 he curated the exhibition Gregor Hildebrandt: Duale Systeme aus der Mauerstadt bei Dirimart Dölapdere, Istanbul, as well as HIT BY NEWS, Press Art from the Collection of Annette and Peter Nobel, at DOX Center for Contemporary Art in Prague.

His life partner is the German curator and art historian Dorothea Strauss. In 2026, they founded Kunsthalle Ausserbinn, an exhibition space in the Swiss Alps.

Doswald lives in and near Zurich.

== Projects ==
- Landscapes of Desire - 4th Industrial Art Biennale (IAB), Istria/Croatia 2023 (with Paolo Bianchi)
- Art Flow, Limmattal 2022
- Heinrich Gartentor: Inseln in der Stadt, curated by Christoph Doswald, Zurich 2019
- Paradise, lost - Skulpturenbiennale Weiertal, Weiertal bei Winterthur 2019
- "NEUER NORDEN ZURICH, Zurich 2018".
- Claudia Comte, Black and White Circles in the Sky, curated by Christoph Doswald, Münsterhof, Zurich 2017 Exhibitions - Claudia Comte)
- And Now The Good News, Museo d'Arte della Svizzera Italiana (MASILugano) / Edizioni Bernasconi, Lugano 2016 (with Elio Schenini)
- Art Altstetten Albisrieden, JRP|Ringier, Zurich 2015
- "Lesen statt Klettern" – Literarische Exkursionen zur Press Art, Das Gelbe Haus Flims 2015
- ART AND THE CITY, A Public Art Project, JRP|Ringier, Zurich 2012
- Wohin mit der Skulptur?, JRP|Ringier, Zurich 2011
- Press Art, Kunstmuseum St. Gallen / Museum der Moderne Salzburg, Stämpfli, Bern 2010
- David Renggli, Hatje Cantz, Ostfildern-Ruit 2007 (with Dorothea Strauss)
- Hanspeter Hofmann, Bonheur Automatique – Printed Works 1992–2007, Villa Arson, Nice / Kunsthaus Graz, JRP|Ringier, Zurich 2007
- "Walter Pfeiffer, Night and Day, Hatje Cantz, Ostfildern-Ruit 2006 (with Dorothea Strauss)".
- Double Face: The Story About Fashion and Art – from Mohammed to Warhol, JRP|Ringier, Zurich 2006
- Schnittpunkt: Kunst + Kleid, Kunstmuseum St. Gallen 2006
- Akris – Mode aus St. Gallen, JRP|Ringier, Zurich 2006
- Rundlederwelten: Fussball und Kunst, Berlin 2005 (with Dorothea Strauss)
- Daniele Buetti, FRAC PACA Marseille / Hatje Cantz, Ostfildern-Ruit 2003
- Happy: Das Versprechen der Werbung, Museum of Communication, Bern / Chronos, Zurich 2002
- Neue Modelle (Björn Dahlem, Peter Friedl, Erik Steinbrecher, Mathilde ter Heijne, Anatolij Shuravlev), Trafó House of Contemporary Arts, Budapest 2001
- Olaf Breuning: Ugly, Hatje Cantz, Ostfildern-Ruit 2001
- Warhol und Beuys: Gegenspieler, Fischer, Frankfurt am Main 2001 (with Paolo Bianchi)
- Press Art, Centre Pasqu'Art Biel, Werd Verlag, Zurich 2000
- Erik Steinbrecher: Couch, Christoph Merian, Basel 2000
- Missing Link: The Image of Man in Contemporary Photography, Kunstmuseum Bern / Kunsthaus Dresden, Edition Stemmle, Zurich / New York 1999
- Nonchalance, Centre Pasqu'Art Biel / Academy of Arts, Berlin, Benteli, Bern 1997

== Awards ==
- The Swiss Confederation's Curator / Art Mediator Prize, 2003
- Most Beautiful Swiss Book (Nonchalance, Zilla Leutenegger, Daniele Buetti, Choucroute au Curry par Hasard, Hanspeter Hofmann)
- Most Beautiful German Book (Nic Hess)
