= Wettingen =

- Municipality
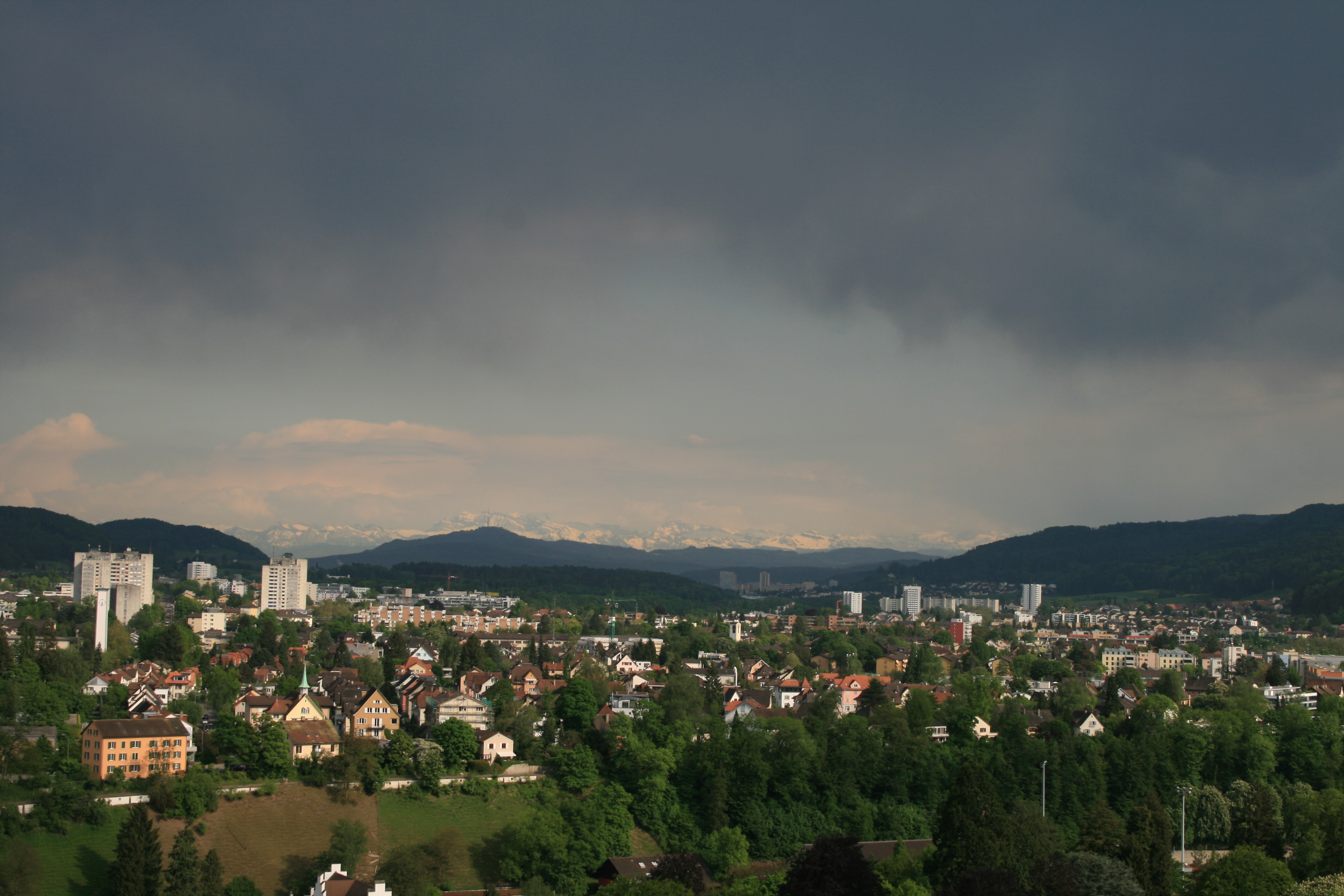

- Flag Coat of arms
- Location of Wettingen
- Location within Switzerland Location within Canton of Aargau
- Coordinates: 47°27′57″N 8°19′36″E
- Country: Switzerland
- Canton: Aargau
- District: Baden

Area
  - Total: 10.59 km^{2} (4.09 sq mi)
- Elevation: 408 m (1,339 ft)

Population (December 2020)
  - Total: 21,099
  - Density: 1,992/km^{2} (5,160/sq mi)
- Time zone: UTC+01:00 (CET)
  - Summer (DST): UTC+02:00 (CEST)
- Postal code: 5430
- SFOS number: 4045
- ISO 3166 code: CH-AG
- Surrounded by: Ennetbaden, Ehrendingen, Otelfingen, Würenlos, Neuenhof, Baden
- Website: www.wettingen.ch

Wettingen (German pronunciation: [ˈvɛtɪŋən]) is a residential community in the district of Baden in the Swiss canton of Aargau. With a population of about 20,000, Wettingen is the second-largest municipality in the canton.

== Geography ==
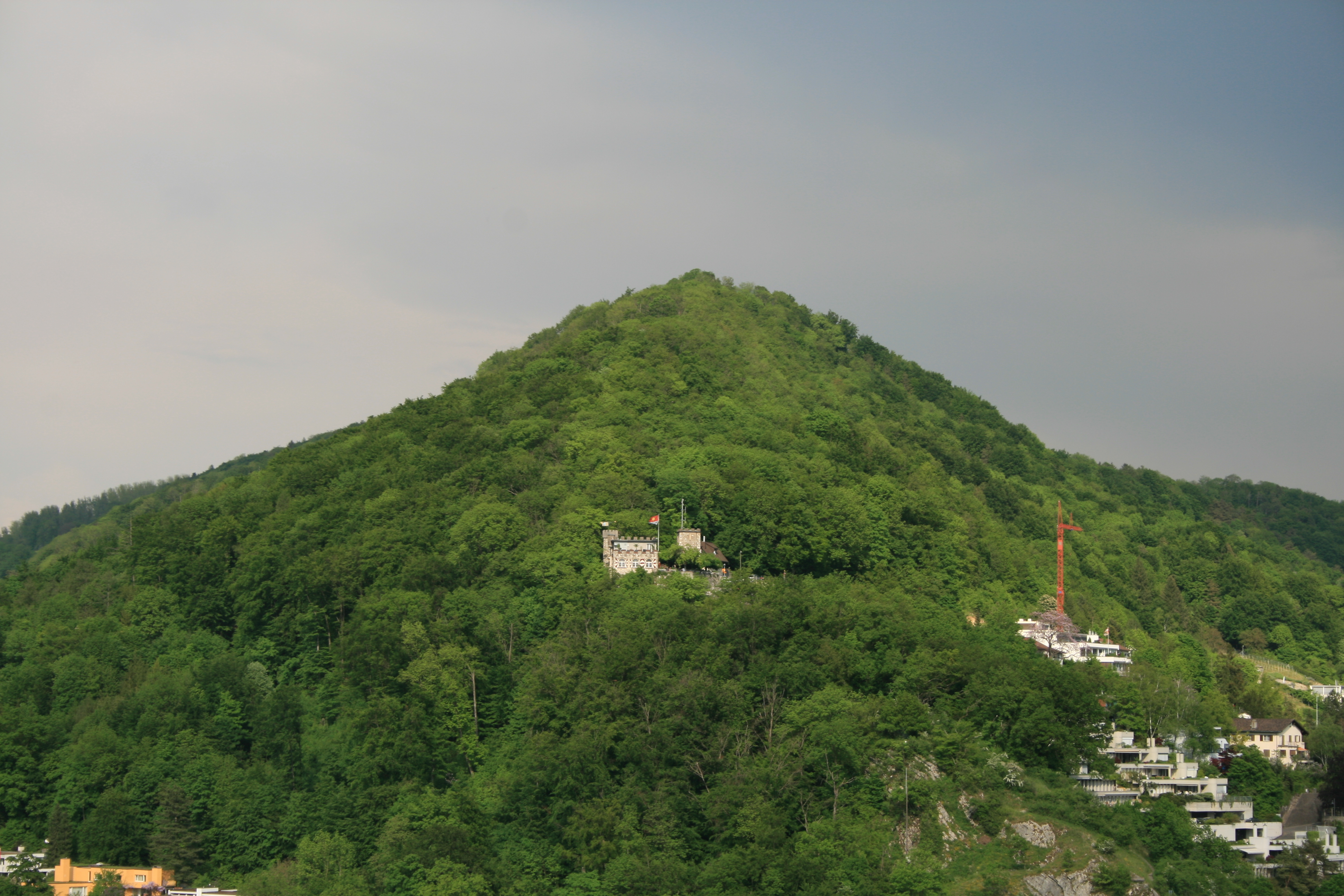
Lägern mountain and Schartenfels castle; only part of the mountain is in Wettingen

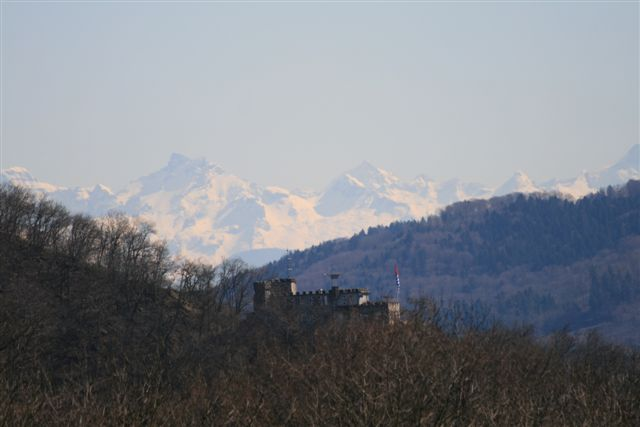
Schartenfels castle

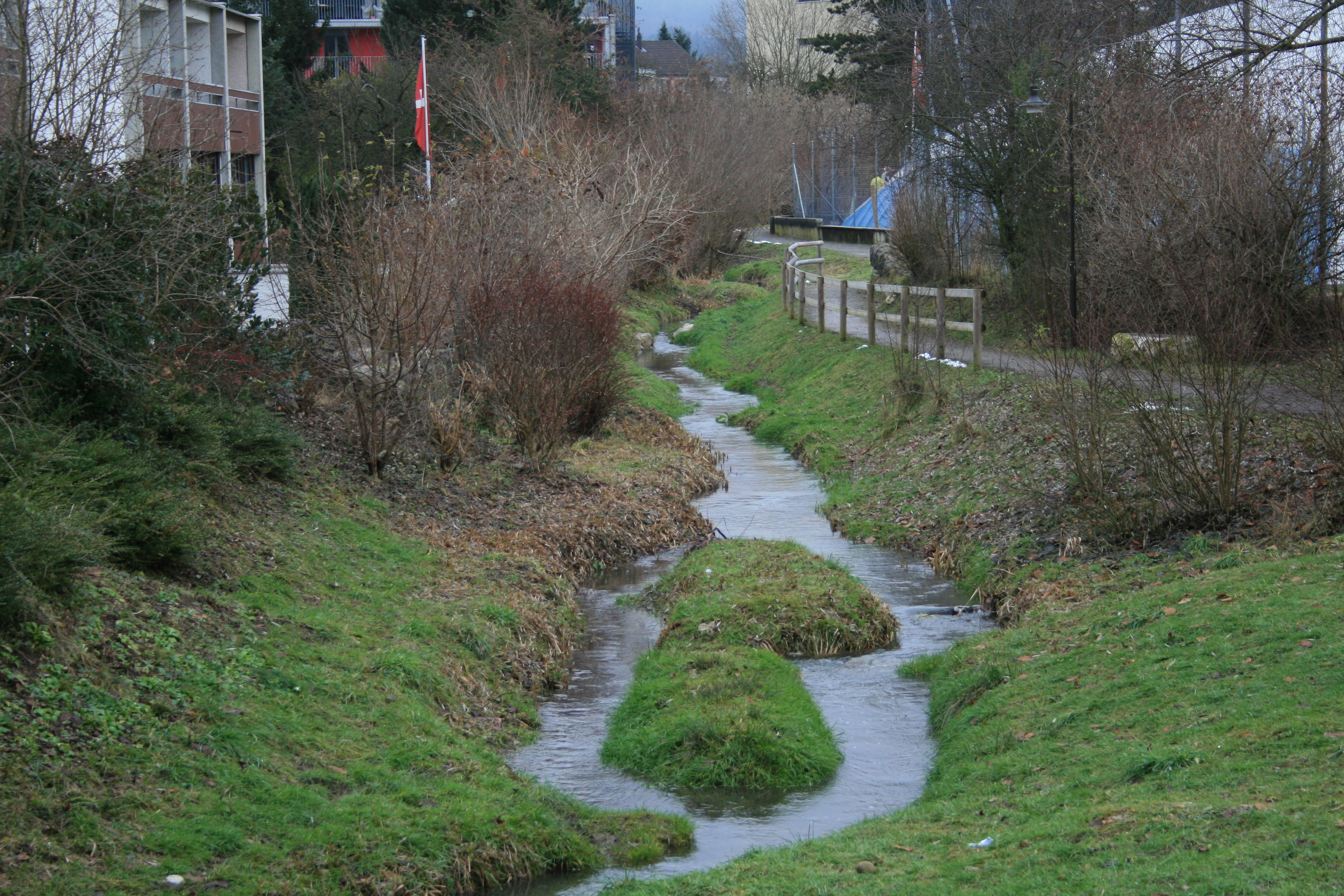
Gottesgraben stream

Aerial view (1958)

Wettingen is located on the right bank of the Limmat, located in the Limmat Valley (German: Limmattal), before the deep valley in Baden. Most of the town is located on the Wettingerfeld (Wettinger Field), which is a flat plain surrounded on all sides by natural borders: to the south and west by the Limmat, to the north by the steep southern slope of the Lägern, and to the East by the Sulperg (569 m (1,867 ft)). A vineyard is located on a section of the Lägern’s slope. Between the Lägern and the Sulperg is the undeveloped Eigital (Eigi valley). At the Eigital’s west end, in the northeastern section of the Wettingerfeld, is the relatively well-maintained old village center. A small creek flows through the Wettingerfeld and empties into the Limmat at the Gottesgraben. The stream is partially directed, partially buried, and partially re-naturalized.

Wettingen has an area, as of 2006, of 10.6 square kilometers (4.1 sq mi). Of this area, 21.6% is used for agricultural purposes, while 39.1% is forested. Of the rest of the land, 37.6% is settled (buildings or roads) and the remainder (1.8%) is non-productive (rivers or lakes). The highest elevation is 859 m (2,818 ft) at the Burghorn, a part of the Lägern, and the lowest elevation is 360 m (1,180 ft) at the Limmat.

The neighboring communities are Ennetbaden, Ehrendingen, and Niederweningen to the north. The community of Otelfingen is located to the east (via S-6), Würenlos to the southwest, Neuenhof to the south, and Baden to the west.

== Coat of arms ==
The blazon of the municipal coat of arms is Gules a Mullet Or and in base wavy Argent three barrulets wavy Azure.

== Demographics ==
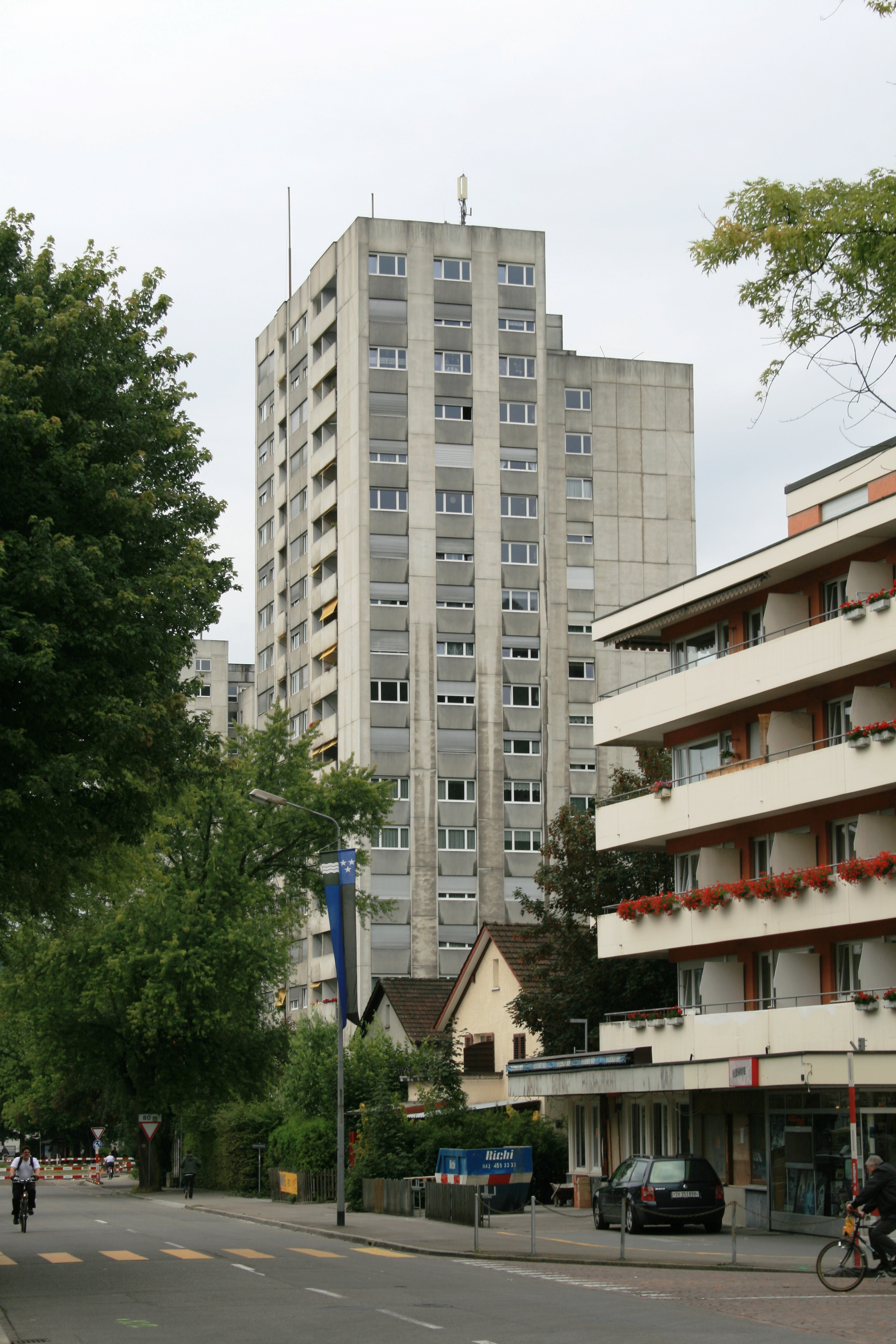
Large apartment block on Alberich Zwyssigstrasse

Wettingen has a population (as of 31 December 2020) of 21,099. As of 2008, 26.3% of the population was made up of foreign nationals. Over the last 10 years the population has grown at a rate of 7.7%. Most of the population (as of 2000) speaks German (84.2%), with Italian being second most common ( 5.1%) and Serbo-Croatian being third ( 2.3%).

The age distribution, as of 2008, in Wettingen is; 1,678 children or 8.5% of the population are between 0 and 9 years old and 1,907 teenagers or 9.7% are between 10 and 19. Of the adult population, 2,595 people or 13.1% of the population are between 20 and 29 years old. 3,045 people or 15.4% are between 30 and 39, 3,212 people or 16.3% are between 40 and 49, and 2,468 people or 12.5% are between 50 and 59. The senior population distribution is 2,101 people or 10.6% of the population are between 60 and 69 years old, 1,690 people or 8.6% are between 70 and 79, there are 897 people or 4.5% who are between 80 and 89, and there are 164 people or 0.8% who are 90 and older.

As of 2000, there were 1,405 homes with 1 or 2 persons in the household, 4,963 homes with 3 or 4 persons in the household, and 1,930 homes with 5 or more persons in the household. The average number of people per household was 2.04 individuals. In 2008 there were 1,855 single family homes (or 18.6% of the total) out of a total of 9,974 homes and apartments. There were a total of 19 empty apartments for a 0.2% vacancy rate. As of 2007, the construction rate of new housing units was 5 new units per 1000 residents.

In the 2007 federal election the most popular party was the SVP which received 29.5% of the vote. The next three most popular parties were the SP (21.1%), the CVP (16.9%) and the FDP (13%).

In Wettingen about 75.2% of the population (between age 25-64) have completed either non-mandatory upper secondary education or additional higher education (either university or a Fachhochschule). Of the school age population (in the 2008/2009 school year), there are 1,130 students attending primary school, there are 467 students attending secondary school, there are 495 students attending tertiary or university level schooling in the municipality.

The historical population is given in the following table:

Historical population
Year	Pop.	±%
1975	19,243	—
1980	18,129	−5.8%
1990	17,582	−3.0%
2000	17,833	+1.4%
2014	20,230	+13.4%

== Heritage sites of national significance ==
The former Cistercian abbey at Klosterstrasse 11 and the Neolithic stone-lined graves at Schartenstrasse 77 are listed as Swiss heritage sites of national significance.

== Economy ==
As of 2007, Wettingen had an unemployment rate of 2.76%. As of 2005, there were 102 people employed in the primary economic sector and about 26 businesses involved in this sector. 1,926 people are employed in the secondary sector and there are 159 businesses in this sector. 5,087 people are employed in the tertiary sector, with 689 businesses in this sector.

As of 2000 there were 9,184 total workers who lived in the municipality. Of these, 6,625 or about 72.1% of the residents worked outside Wettingen while 4,223 people commuted into the municipality for work. There were a total of 6,782 jobs (of at least 6 hours per week) in the municipality. Of the working population, 27.4% used public transportation to get to work, and 40% used a private car.

== Religion ==
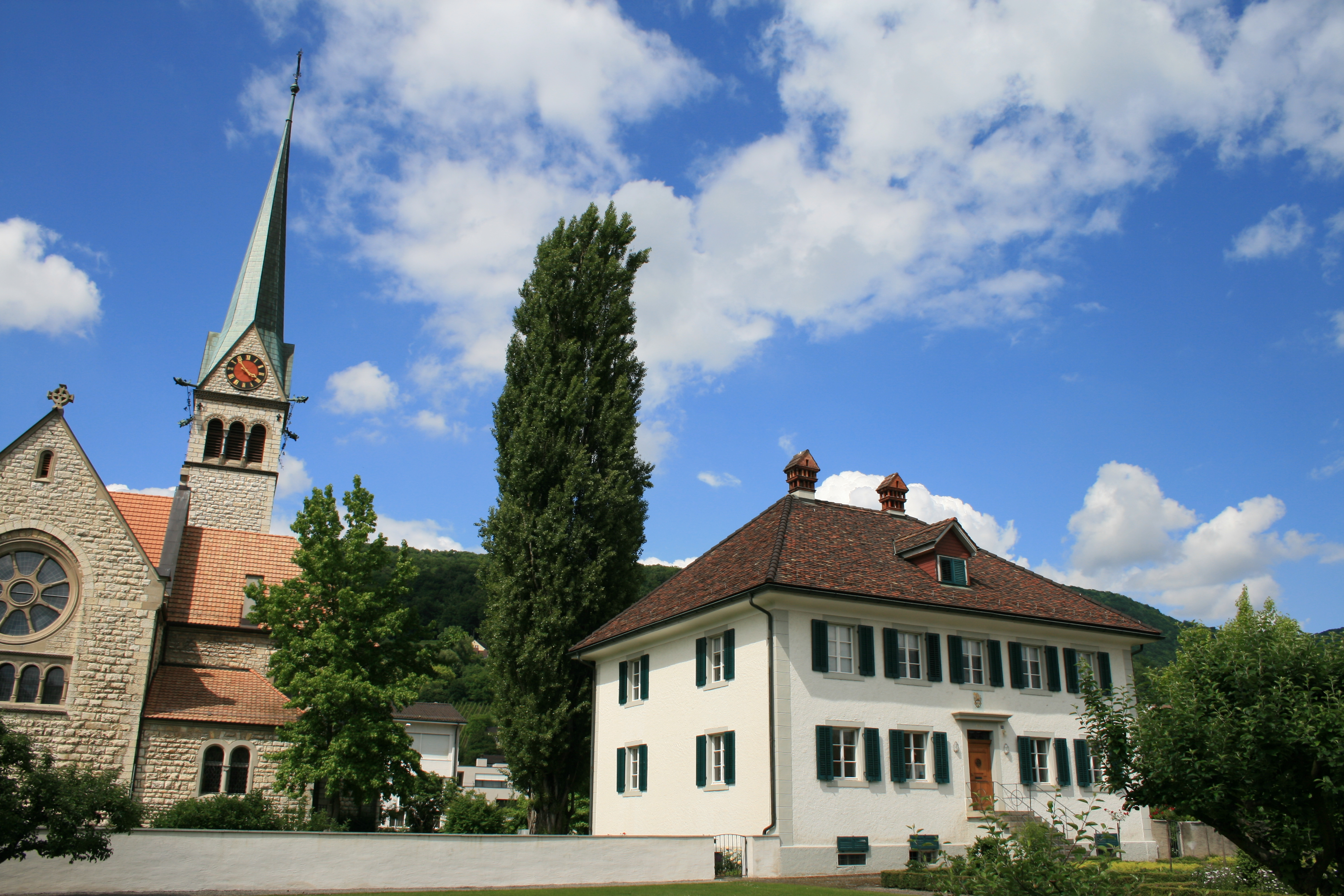
Church of St. Sebastian

From the 2000 census, 8,662 or 48.5% are Roman Catholic, while 4,814 or 26.9% belonged to the Swiss Reformed Church. Of the rest of the population, there are 40 individuals (or about 0.22% of the population) who belong to the Christian Catholic faith.

== Transportation ==
The municipality is located on the A3 motorway. Wettingen railway station is a stop of the S-Bahn Zürich on the lines S6 and S12. Together with Baden, it is served by the RVBW bus network, the central garage for which is located in Wettingen. In particular, lines 1, 4, 7 and 8 Pass through Wettingen, and in the rush hour, line 6 extends along the route of line 1.

== Sport ==
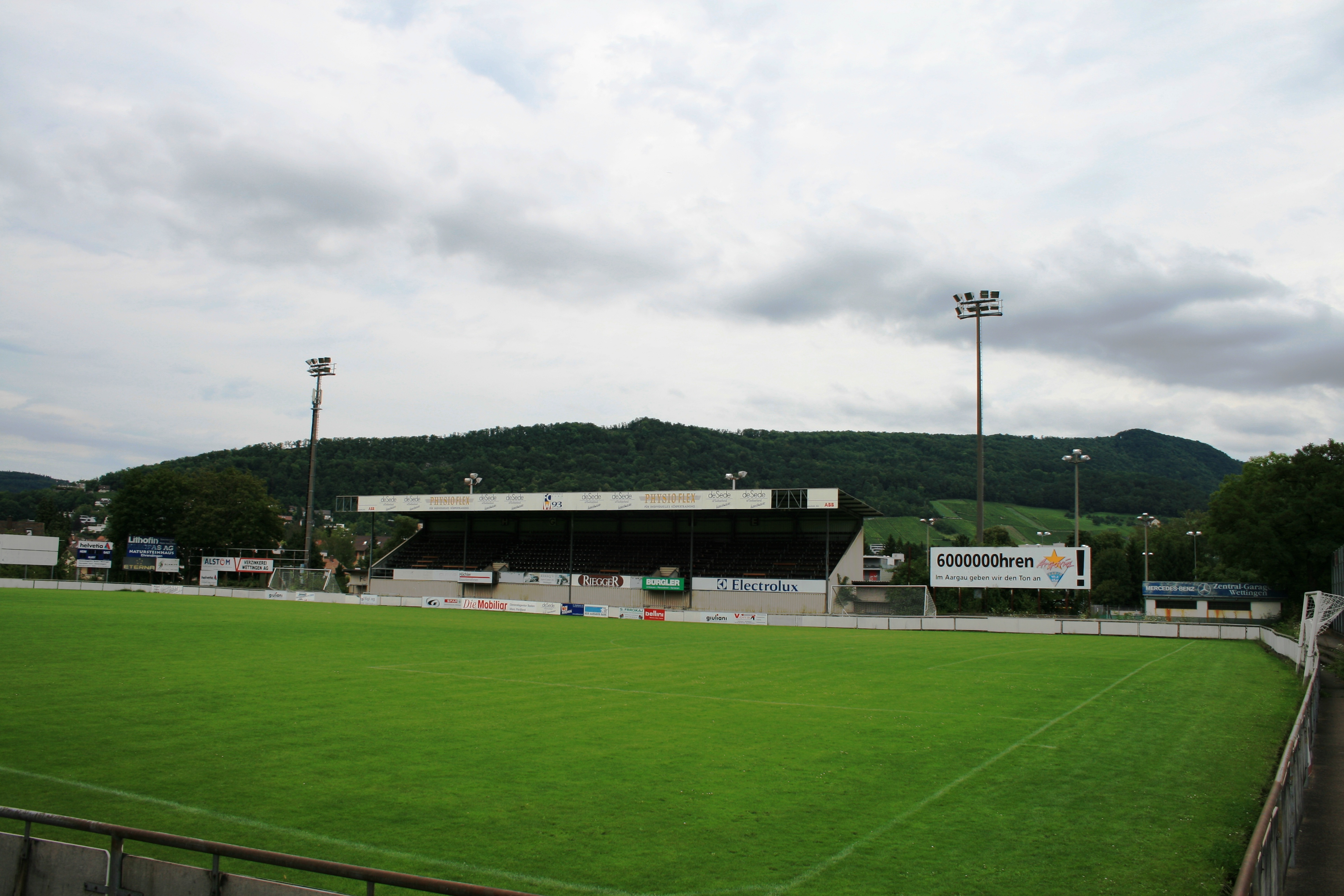
Stadion Altenburg

FC Wettingen 93 are the local football team and play at Stadion Altenburg. Their most famous achievement to date is appearing in the UEFA Cup in 1989-90.

== Notable people ==
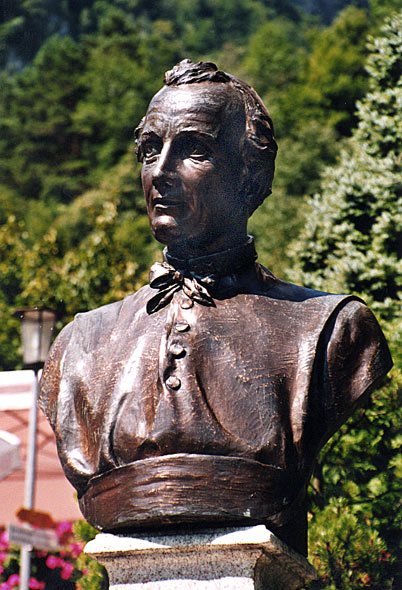
Alberich Zwyssig

- Johann Daniel Elster (1796–1857 in Wettingen), a German music professor and choirmaster
- Alberich Zwyssig (1808–1854), composer of the Swiss Psalm (Swiss National anthem), lived in Wettingen Abbey 1821/1841
- Traugott Sandmeyer (1845–1922), a Swiss chemist after whom the Sandmeyer reaction is named
- Eduard Spörri (1901–1995), sculptor
- Jörg Kühn (1940–1964), wildlife artist and scientific illustrator
- Walter Seiler (born 1954), a retired Swiss footballer, over 250 club caps
- Eric Hattan (born 1955), a Swiss concept, video, performance and installation artist
- Bernhard Müller (born 1957), commander of the Swiss Air Force, grew up in Wettingen
- Bernhard M. Hämmerli (born 1958), computer scientist
- Christoph Doswald (born 1961), publicist, curator und university lecturer, grew up in Wettingen
- Yvonne Feri (born 1966), politician and member of the National Council
- Markus Bundi (born 1969), a Swiss writer
- José Maria Larocca (born 1969), an Argentinian equestrian
