= Yvonne Feri =

Swiss politician

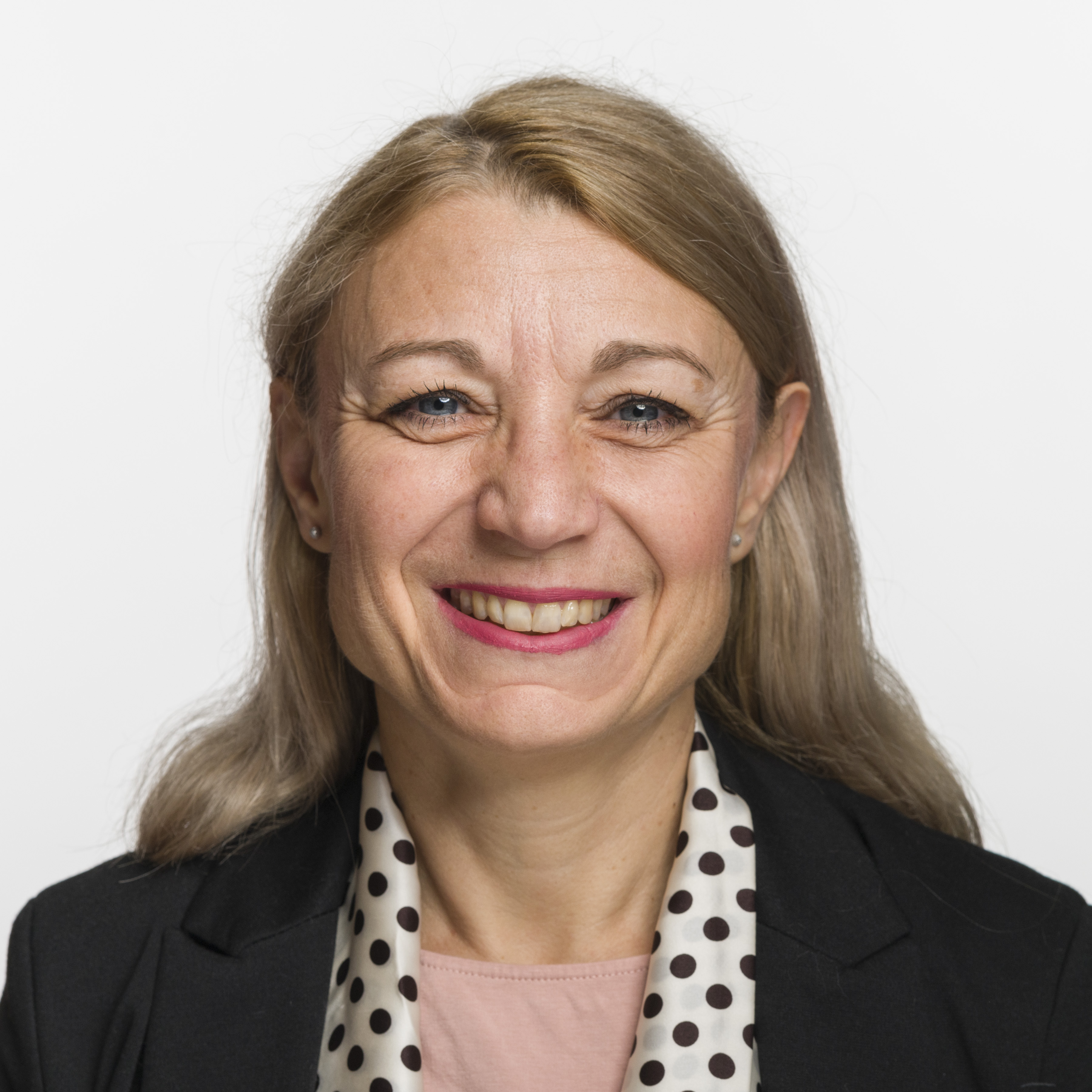

Member of the National Council
- Incumbent
- Assumed office 5 December 2011

Personal details
- Born: 21 March 1966 (age 60) Baden, Switzerland
- Party: Social Democratic Party of Switzerland

Yvonne Feri (born 21 March 1966) is a Swiss politician who has served as a member of the National Council since 2011.

== Life ==
Born in Baden and raised in nearby Hedingen, Feri worked at the Swiss Farmers Union under an apprenticeship after graduating from school, and shortly after moved into politics. Her first elected political position was to the Grand Council of Aargau, and served in their council from 1998 to 2008. She also served as a member of the municipal council for Wettingen during that time, serving from 2001 to 2005.

After her term on the Grand Council ended, Feri served as the Zürich Teachers Association's chief executive. In 2011, she ran for a seat on the National Council, and placed fourth out of the Social Democratic Party of Switzerland (SP) candidates. Three were elected to the Council, so she was the first alternate should a seat open up. Less than two months after the election, Pascale Bruderer resigned as she had been elected to the Council of States, opening a seat up for Feri. A year later, she became President of SP Frauen Schweiz, the SP Women's Division. After being re-elected to the National Council in 2015, she ran for the Executive Committee of Aargau the following year, but lost the election.
