= School of Computer Science =

School of Computer Science may refer to:

- Australia
  - National Computer Science School
  - UNSW School of Computer Science and Engineering
- Canada
  - David R. Cheriton School of Computer Science at University of Waterloo
  - McGill University School of Computer Science
  - School of Electrical Engineering and Computer Science (University of Ottawa)
- Germany
  - Lucerne School of Computer Science and Information Technology
  - Mannheim School of Computer Science and Mathematics
- Pakistan
  - NUST School of Electrical Engineering and Computer Science
- United States
  - Carnegie Mellon School of Computer Science
  - Donald Bren School of Information and Computer Sciences
  - Georgia Institute of Technology School of Computer Science
  - Khoury College of Computer Sciences at Northeastern University
- United Kingdom
  - School of Computer Science and Electronic Engineering, Essex University
  - School of Computer Science, the former name for the Department of Computer Science, University of Manchester

== See also ==
- Computer science education
