= Lucerne School of Computer Science and Information Technology =

- Type: Public university
- Established: 2016
- Parent institution: Lucerne University of Applied Sciences and Arts
- Location: Rotkreuz, Rotkreuz in Kanton Zug, Switzerland
- Website: www.hslu.ch/en/lucerne-school-of-information-technology/

The Lucerne School of Computer Science and Information Technology (Hochschule Luzern – Informatik) is a professional school for information technology (IT) in Switzerland. Often called just School of Information Technology, it is a division of the Lucerne University of Applied Sciences and Arts. The campus is in Rotkreuz in Kanton Zug.

== History ==
The Lucerne School of Computer Science and Information Technology was formed in 2016 as a separate department of the Lucerne University of Applied Sciences and Arts. The department was merged from the IT department of the School of Engineering and Architecture and the institute of business informatic of the Business School and Management. The campus is Rotkreuz in Kanton Zug. A new building there, used jointly with the Institute of Financial Services, was opened in 2019. All study programs are offered at one location.

== Study programs ==
Research at the School of Information Technology includes studies of constraint satisfaction and discrete optimisation, digital image processing, machine learning, mobile computing, and natural language processing.

The school offers bachelor's degrees and master's degrees. The six bachelor study programs are:

- Artificial Intelligence and Machine Learning
- Digital Ideation
- Computer Science
- Information and Cyber Security
- International IT Management
- Business Information Technology.

The study program for cyber security was installed in 2018, as the first such course at a university of applied sciences in Switzerland. Guy Parmelin who was then Bundesrat responsible for defence and security, and is now president of Switzerland, inaugurated the program that he had promoted.

The master's study courses are:

- Master of Science in Engineering
- Master of Science in Business Information Technology
- Master Digital Ideation

A joint master's degree is offered in the field of Specialized Media.

== Impact ==
In international collaboration, the school works with universities such as Purdue University. It is a partner in international conferences, such as the Swisstext 2016, a conference for text analytics. The school and the division of innovation and technology launched a project in 2017 aiming at a connection and collaboration between small and medium-sized enterprises (SME) and start-ups. In 2018, scientists from the Lucerne School of Information Technology participated in an international research network project to advise politicians of the European Union (EU) regarding blockchain technology.

The school is sponsored by large companies in the region such as Siemens Building Technologies and Roche Diagnostics, and smaller companies. The companies expect qualified personnel and a collaboration in education and research.
