= Daniele Buetti =

Swiss artist (born 1955)

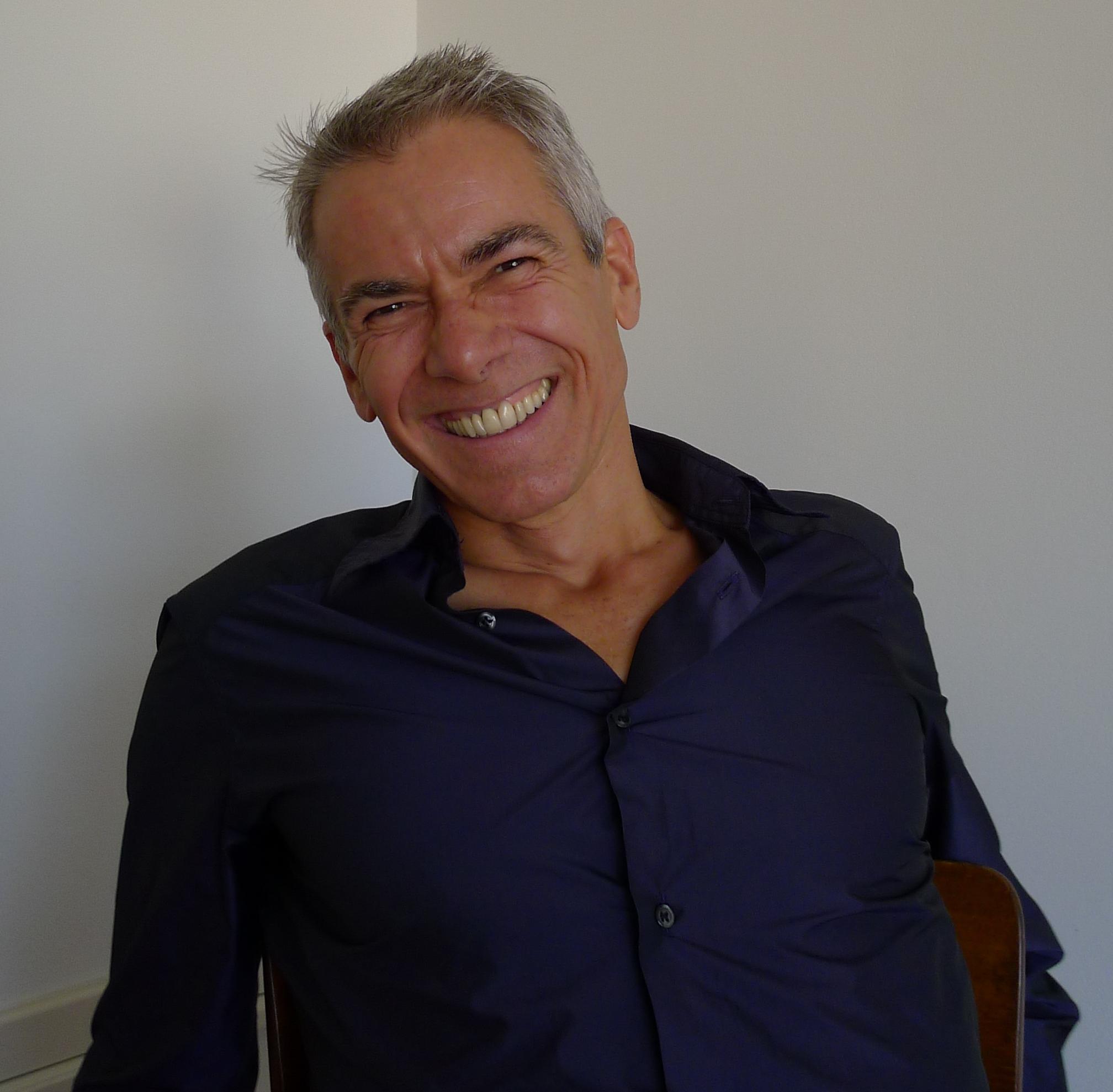
- Buetti in 2011
- Born: 1955 (age 70–71); Fribourg, Switzerland

Daniele Buetti (born 1955) is a Swiss visual artist who works in several modes including installation and intervention. The media he works with includes photography, sculpture, drawing, sound, video and digital forms. He is professor at University of Fine Arts Munster where he has taught since 2004. He lives and works in Zurich, Switzerland and Münster, Germany.

His work has been described as "an expression of world-weariness and the individual’s precarious existential orientation." In the 1990s Buetti's work served as a visual critiques of the consumption of beauty. This work often appropriated images of models and high-fashion consumer products from magazines that were pierced with a ballpoint pen.

A monograph on his work, Daniele Buetti: it's all in the mind was published in 2014 by Hirmer Publishers. The volume includes essays by Buetti, Matthias Ulrich, Max Hollein, and Jane Michael.

Buetti was born in Fribourg, Switzerland.

Buetti's work has been widely exhibited nationally and internationally in museums and galleries including the Schirn Kunsthalle, Frankfurt and the Kunsthaus Wien. His work was the subject of a one-person show, Could a dream be enough, at the Museo Nacional Centro de Arte Reina Sophia. His work was presented in a solo exhibition at the Swiss Institute for Contemporary Art in New York City. Buetti has also exhibited his work at Helmhaus Zurich where his installation, Auf allen Knien (On All Knees) was presented.

== Public collections ==
- Collection du F.R.A.C (Fond régional d’Art Contemporain, Provence-Alpes-côte d’Azur)
- DaimlerChrysler Collection, Berlin
- Elgiz Museum, Istanbul, Turkey
- Fotomuseum Winterthur
- Kunsthaus, Bregenz
- Johnson Museum of Art, Cornell University
- Migros Museum für Gegenwartskunst, Zurich
- Musée de l'Elysée, Lausanne
- Museum HausKonstruktiv, Zurich
- ZKM, Zentrum für Kunst undMedientechnologie, Karlsruhe
