= Markus Bundi =

Swiss linguist and author (born 1969)

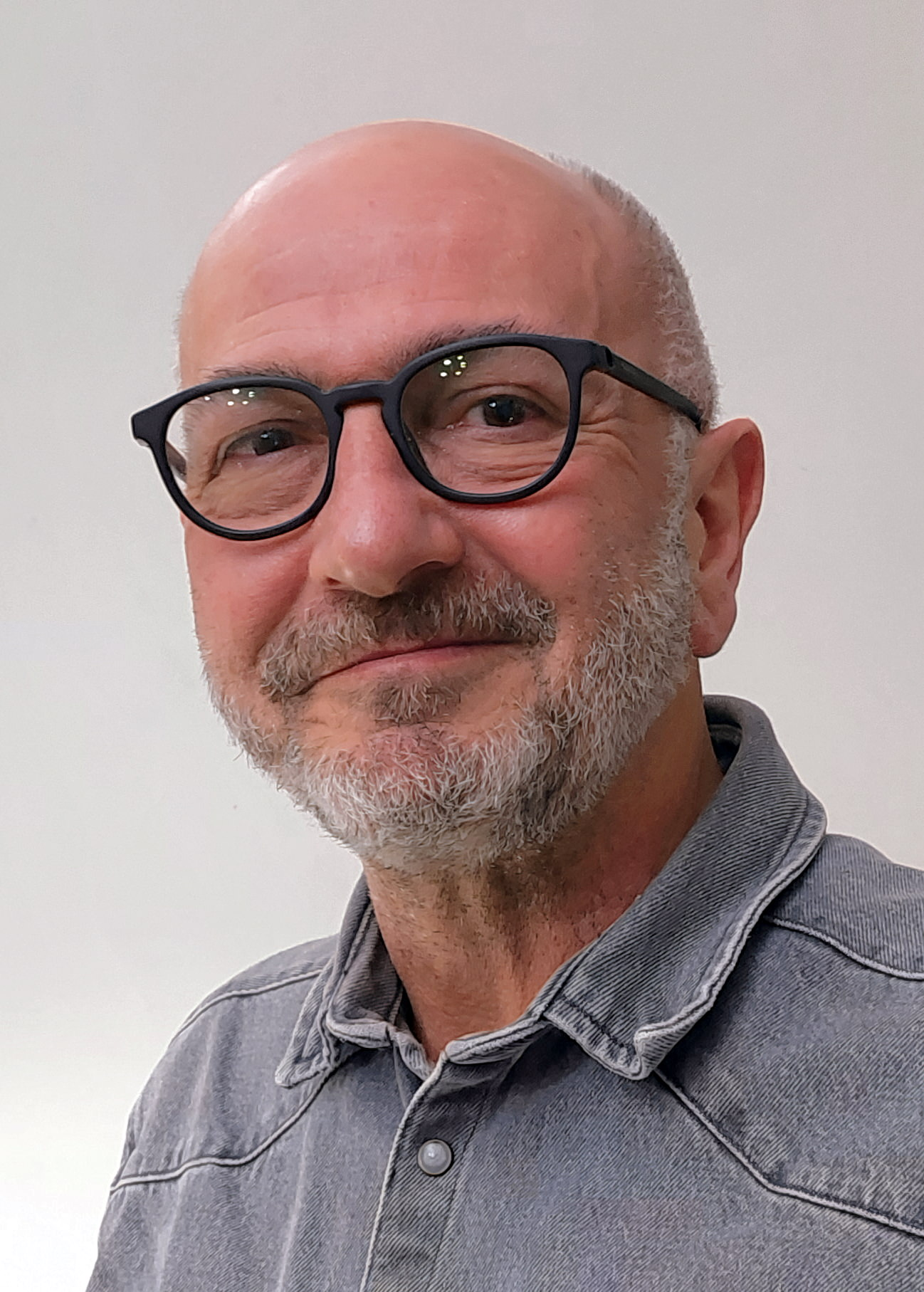
- Born: 7 August 1969 (age 57); Wettingen, Baden, Aargau, Switzerland
- Education: University of Zurich
- Occupations: Editor, educator, translator, writer
- Writing career
- Years active: 2001 – present
- Period: Contemporary
- Genres: Crime fiction; essay; satire; social science fiction
- Website: markusbundi.ch

Markus Bundi (born 7 August 1969 in Wettingen) is a Swiss writer.

== Early life, education and career ==
Bundi grew up in Nussbaumen in the municipality of Obersiggenthal near Baden in the canton of Aargau.

After graduating from high school, he studied philosophy, new German literature and linguistics at the University of Zurich. During his studies, he worked as a sports editor at the Badener Tagblatt from 1995 to 1996, after which he was culture editor at the Aargauer Zeitung until 2005.

In 2001 and 2002, Markus Bundi served on the program committee of the Solothurner Literaturtage.

Since 2005, he has taught philosophy and German at the Old Cantonal School Aarau.

Bundi became known to a wider audience with his 2011 novella Emilie's Silence (German: Emilies Schweigen), in which Emilie T., a nurse accused of killing more than 70 patients, does not speak a word during the entire trial. Instead, her young public defender, David Moor, speaks, and through his strategy of in dubio pro reo he achieves an acquittal despite being convinced of Emilie's guilt. The story received positive reviews outside Switzerland as well.

In January 2021, Bundi's dystopian novel The Last Colony (German: Die letzte Kolonie) was published, in which he tells the story of the last human colony living underground in a state of twilight.

Since 2001, Bundi has worked as a writer and as the editor of the edition of Klaus Merz's works at Haymon Verlag. At Wolfbach Verlag, he edited the poetry series "The Row" (German: Die Reihe) since 2010, in which at least four titles were published each year.

== Personal life ==
Bundi lives in Neuenhof in the canton of Aargau.

== Works ==
=== Novels, novellas, short stories ===
- Ausgezogen (Erzählung). Zürich: Edition Epoca. 2006. ISBN 3-905513-39-0.
- Sehr geehrte und andere (Erzählungen). Eggingen: Edition Isele. 2009. ISBN 978-3-86142-469-7.
- Gehen am Ort. Eggingen: Edition Isele. 2011. ISBN 978-3-86142-522-9.
- Dass Raubtiere gezähmt werden (mit einem Linolschnitt von Josef Fürpaß). Lyrik aus der Offizin S., H. 17. Bibliophile Ausgabe, 55 nummerierte und signierte Exemplare. Meran: Offizin S. 2012.
- Emilies Schweigen (Novelle). Tübingen: Klöpfer & Meyer Verlag. 2013. ISBN 978-3-86351-053-4.
- Die Rezeptionistin (Erzählung). Tübingen: Klöpfer & Meyer Verlag. 2014. ISBN 978-3-86351-074-9.
  - CD. Mona kussecht (Eine Klangreise). Nic Niedermann & Markus Bundi. Tübingen: Klöpfer & Meyer Verlag. 2014. ISBN 978-3-86351-504-1.
- Mann ohne Pflichten (Roman). Tübingen: Klöpfer & Meyer Verlag. 2015. ISBN 978-3-86351-404-4.
- Planglück (Erzählungen). Tübingen: Klöpfer & Meyer Verlag. 2017. ISBN 978-3-86351-453-2.
- Alte Bande (Kriminalroman). Wien: Septime. 2019. ISBN 978-3-902711-82-3.
- Der Junge, der den Hauptbahnhof Zürich in die Luft sprengte (Erzählungen). Wien: Septime Verlag. 2020. ISBN 978-3-902711-89-2.
- Die letzte Kolonie (Roman). Wien: Septime Verlag. 2021. ISBN 978-3-99120-003-1.
- Wilde Tiere (Roman). Wien: Septime Verlag. 2024. ISBN 978-3-99120-037-6.
- Zur krummen Brücke (Aufzeichnungen eines Gastwirts). Stuttgart: Kröner Verlag (Edition Klöpfer). 2025. ISBN 978-3-520-77203-9.
- Hayo (Séraphines Roman). Stuttgart: Kröner Verlag (Edition Klöpfer). 2026. ISBN 978-3-520-77401-9.

=== Essays ===
- Denkzettel (Betrachtungen zur Lage der Gesellschaft). Wien: Septime Verlag. 2022. ISBN 978-3-99120-015-4.
- Zu sagen, was nicht ist (Eine Vorstellung). Innsbruck: Limbus Verlag. 2026. ISBN 978-3-99039-287-4.

On Urs Faes

- Einer wie Lenz im Labyrinth (Ein Essay zum Werk von Urs Faes). Zürich: Telegramme Verlag. 2022. ISBN 978-3-907198-56-8.

On Christian Haller

- Von Unmittelbarkeit zu Unmittelbarkeit (Ein Essay zum Werk von Christian Haller). Eggingen: Edition Isele. 2008. ISBN 978-3-86142-439-0.

On Marlen Haushofer

- Begründung eines Sprachraums (Ein Essay zum Werk von Marlen Haushofer). Innsbruck: Limbus Verlag. 2019. ISBN 978-3-99039-153-2.
- Haushofer, Marlen (2020). Der gute Bruder Ulrich (Märchen-Trilogie). Nachwort von Markus Bundi. Innsbruck: Limbus Verlag. ISBN 978-3-99039-165-5.

On Heinrich von Kleist

- Der Vater ist der Vater (Zu Heinrich von Kleists unwahrscheinlichen Wahrhaftigkeiten). Innsbruck: Limbus Verlag. 2021. ISBN 978-3-99039-134-1.

On Klaus Merz

- Die Schwerkraft im Gleichgewicht (Ein Essay zum Werk von Klaus Merz). Edition Isele. 2005. ISBN 3-86142-364-2.
- Des Möglichen gewärtig (Ein Essay zum Werk von Klaus Merz). Innsbruck: Haymon Verlag. 2015. ISBN 978-3-7099-7220-5.

On Franz Tumler

- Wirklichkeit im Nachsitzen (Ein Essay zur Ästhetik in Franz Tumlers Spätwerk). Innsbruck: Haymon Verlag. 2018. ISBN 978-3709934210.

Collaborative collections

- Herrmann, Svenja; Ulrich, Ulrike, eds. (2008). 60 Jahre Menschenrechte. 30 literarische Texte. Zürich: Salis Verlag. ISBN 978-3-905801-19-4.

=== Handbooks ===
- Die Aufgabe (Handbuch für gute Lehrpersonen). Bern: hep Verlag. 2020. ISBN 978-3-0355-1681-4.

=== Poetry ===
- Aus Zeiten (Gedichte). Zürich: Wolfbach Verlag. 2001. ISBN 3-95-22831-0-X.
- Lichterdings (Prosa & Gedichte). Zürich: Wolfbach Verlag. 2002. ISBN 3-95 22831-1-8.
- Entsichert (Gedichte). Eggingen: Edition Isele. 2004. ISBN 3-86142-303-0.
- Das Grinsen des Horizonts (Prosa und Gedichte). Eggingen: Edition Isele. 2007. ISBN 978-3-86142-424-6.
- Kleine Rolle rückwärts (Gedichte). Nachwort von Andreas Wirthensohn. Eggingen: Edition Isele. 2013. ISBN 978-3-86142-574-8.
- Ankunft der Seifenblasen (Gedichte). mit Fotografien von Franjo Seiler. Frauenfeld: Waldgut Verlag. 2018. ISBN 978-3-03740-134-7.
- Lichte Anker (Gedichte). Luzern: edition ars pro toto. 2024. ISBN 978-3-9525838-2-1.

=== Theater ===
- Die Verhandlung (The Trial), June 4, 2010 in Aarau, based on texts by Franz Kafka
- Der Bastard (The Bastard), 2005 Kurtheater Baden
- Die Geschichte (The Story), May 29, 2003 at Keller62 in Zürich

== See also ==
- List of novelists by nationality
- List of science-fiction authors
- List of Swiss people
