= Lucerne University of Applied Sciences and Arts =

Public university in Lucerne, Switzerland

- Hochschule Luzern (HSLU)
- Type: Public university
- Established: 1997; 29 years ago
- Affiliations: Swissuniversities
- Rector: Barbara Bader
- Faculty: 2,144 (2025).
- Students: 8,696 (2025).
- Location: Lucerne, Canton of Lucerne, Switzerland; 47.014°N 8.306°E
- Campus: Lucerne, Horw, Emmenbrücke, Rotkreuz
- Nickname: HSLU
- Website: http://www.hslu.ch/

The Lucerne University of Applied Sciences and Arts (German: Hochschule Luzern) (HSLU) is a public university of applied sciences funded by the six cantons of Central Switzerland. Founded in 1997 as the University of Applied Sciences Central Switzerland (German: Fachhochschule Zentralschweiz), it is the largest educational institution in the region. It fulfils the mandate assigned by the contributing cantons in the areas of education, continuing and executive education, research, and services. As a university of applied sciences, it is practice-oriented and generally open to candidates with a vocational, specialized or academic baccalaureate (the latter in combination with relevant professional experience.

In 2025, 8,696 students were enrolled in bachelor's or master's degree programmes and 12,411 participants attended continuing and executive education programmes (MAS, DAS, CAS, SAS) at the HSLU. Barbara Bader has served as President since 1 December 2022.

The HSLU has campuses in Lucerne, Horw, Emmenbrücke and Rotkreuz. It previously also maintained a small campus for Financial Services in Zug, which have since moved to the Rotkreuz campus.

== History ==
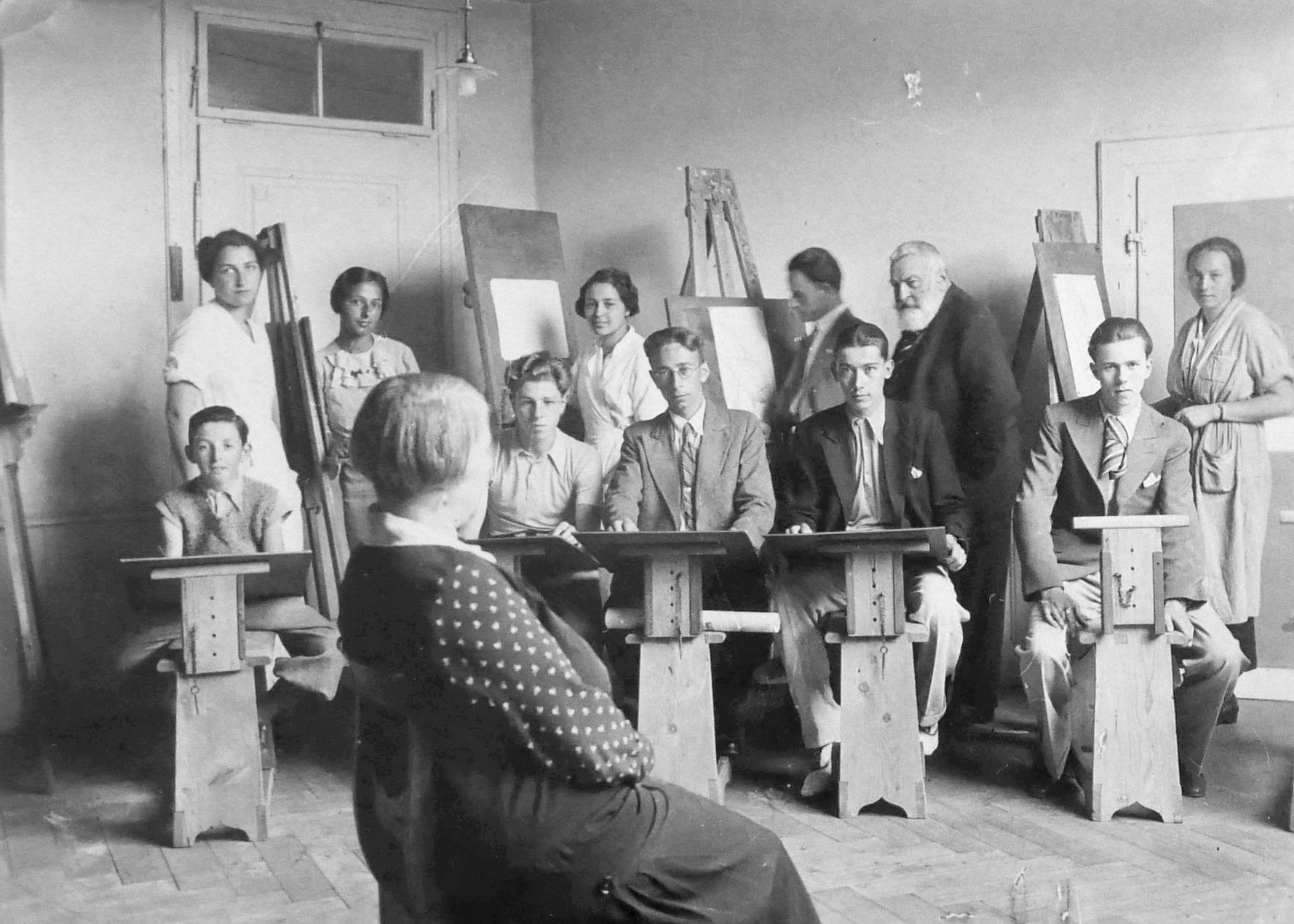
Art class at Kunstgewerbeschule Luzern, 1877

The university was founded in 1997 as the University of Applied Sciences Central Switzerland (Fachhochschule Zentralschweiz, FHZ), based on the Federal Act on Universities of Applied Sciences and funded by the six contributing Central Swiss cantons of Lucerne, Uri, Schwyz, Obwalden, Nidwalden and Zug.

In its founding year, 293 students were enrolled across the initial fields of study of engineering and architecture, and business. Design, film and art, social work and music were added later.

Since 15 October 2007, the constituent Schools of the former University of Applied Sciences Central Switzerland have also been using the shared name Lucerne University of Applied Sciences and Arts (Hochschule Luzern). Initially, the Schools of Engineering and Architecture, Business, and Design, Film and Art were funded by the Canton of Lucerne, whereas the Schools of Music and Social Work were financed by foundations. With the adoption of a new universities of applied sciences agreement on 1 January 2013, responsibility for all Schools was transferred to the contributing cantons.

The School of Computer Science and Information Technology was established in 2016.

In the 2018 autumn semester, HSLU announced its bachelor’s programme in yodelling. The programme attracted significant international media attention and is part of broader academic and cultural efforts to preserve and promote yodelling as an element of Switzerland’s intangible cultural heritage. Switzerland has sought recognition of yodelling on UNESCO’s Representative List of the Intangible Cultural Heritage of Humanity.

== Schools ==
The Lucerne University of Applied Sciences and Arts consists of six Schools. The University offers English and German-taught bachelor’s and master’s programmes as well as continuing and executive education programmes in subjects ranging from Design to Music, Fine Arts, Animation 2D/3D, Object Design, Banking and Finance, International Management and Economics, and Sustainable Energy Systems.

=== Engineering and Architecture ===
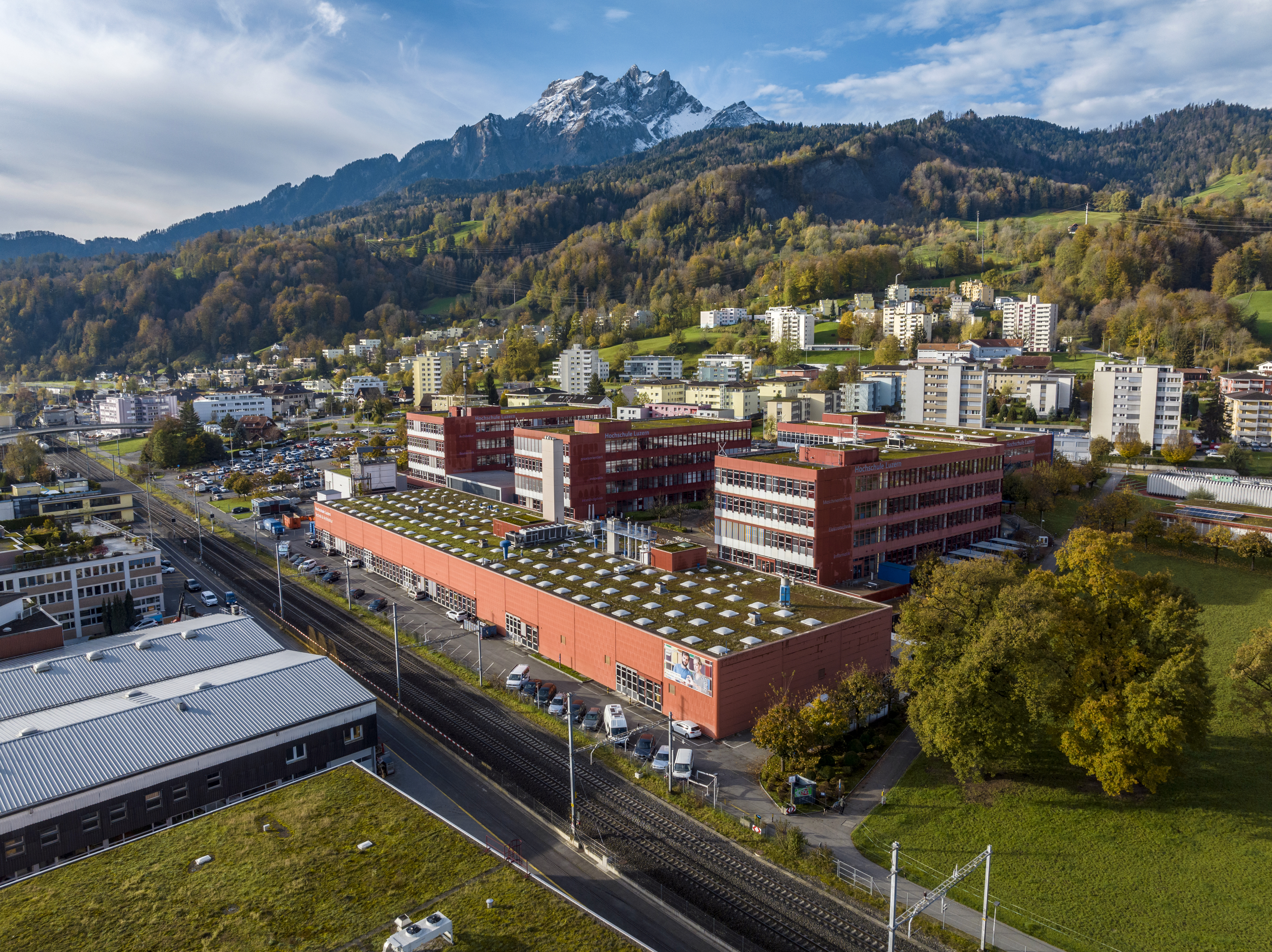
Horw Campus of HSLU

The School of Engineering and Architecture is based in Horw near Lucerne and offers bachelor’s and master’s degree programmes in Architecture, Interior Architecture, Civil Engineering, Building Services Engineering and Energy, Electrical Engineering, Mechanical Engineering and Energy Systems, Innovation and Technology Management, Medical Engineering, and Applied Sciences and Humanities. It conducts applied research and development across multiple institutes and cooperates with industry and business partners.

Manfred Huber has served as Dean since 1 August 2025.

==== Courses ====
The School offers eleven bachelor's degree programmes in Engineering, Architecture and Construction:

- Architecture
- Interior Architecture
- Civil Engineering (specialisations: Structures and Structural Design; Water and Natural Hazards; Building Envelope)
- Digital Construction
- Building Technology | Energy (specialisations: Heating, Ventilation, Air Conditioning and Sanitation; Building Electrical Engineering)
- Electrical Engineering and Information Technology (specialisations: Energy and Drive Systems; AI and Signal Processing; Industrial Computing; Mechatronics/Automation/Robotics)
- Mechanical Engineering (specialisations: General Mechanical Engineering; Product Development and Design; Robotics and Automation; Energy and Process Engineering; Aerospace)
- Digital Engineering | Robotics and Big Data
- Business Engineering | Innovation (specialisations: Product Management and New Business Development; Operations Management; Sales and Marketing Management)
- Medical Engineering | Life Sciences (specialisations: Medical Device Development; Life Sciences; Medical Informatics & Data Science)
- Energy and Environmental Systems Engineering (specialisations: Energy Systems; Environmental Systems)

The School also offers three masters' degree programmes: Engineering, Architecture, and Integrated Spatial Development.

=== Computer Science and Information Technology ===
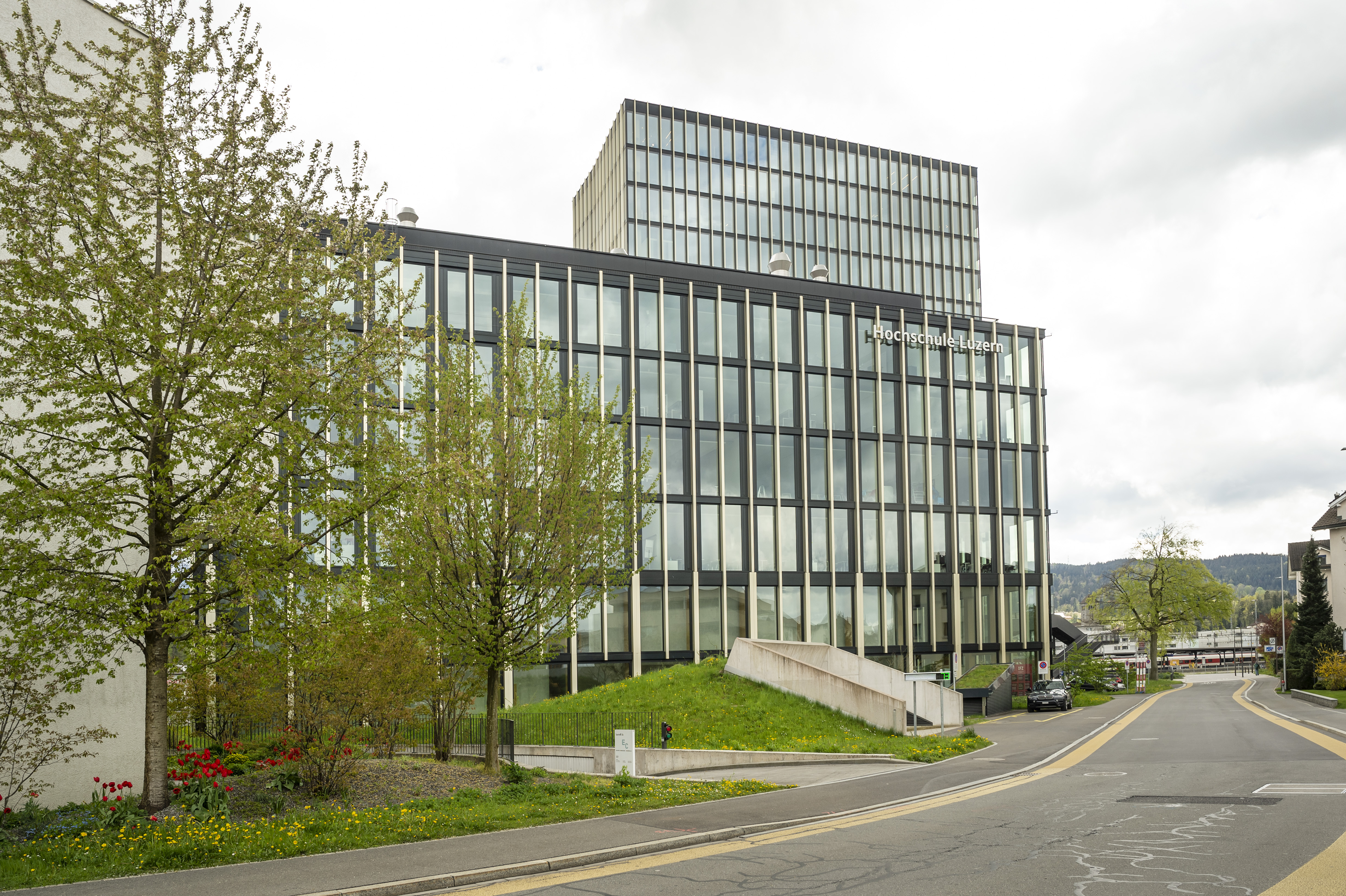
Rotkreuz Campus of HSLU

The School of Computer Science and Technology, located in Rotkreuz in the Canton of Zug, was established in 2016. It was formed through the merger of the Computer Science unit of the School of Engineering and Architecture with the Business Information Technology unit of the School of Business. Key topics include data science, AI, blockchain, immersive realities, software engineering, security, and digital business.

Sarah Hauser has served as Dean since 1 September 2025.

==== Courses ====
The Lucerne School of Computer Science and Transformation Technology offers eight bachelor's degree programmes:

- Artificial Intelligence and Machine Learning
- Computer Science
- Digital Ideation
- Immersive Technologies
- Information Technology
- Information and Cyber Security
- International IT Management
- Business Information Technology

The School also offers the following master’s degree programmes:

- Digital Ideation
- Engineering
- IT, Digitalization and Sustainability
- Information and Cyber Security
- Music and Digital Creation
- Business Information Technology

=== Business ===
The School of Business, located in Lucerne and Zug, offers degree programmes and continuing education across business and management disciplines, including Banking and Finance, Communication and Marketing, Management, Regional Economics, and Tourism and Mobility.

Christine Böckelmann serves as Dean. The School obtained AACSB accreditation in 2021.

==== Courses ====
The Lucerne School of Business offers six bachelor’s programmes:

- Business Administration
- International Business Administration
- Business Psychology
- Economics and Data Science in Mobility
- Hospitality Management
- International Sustainable Tourism

In addition, six Master of Science programmes with various specialisations (majors) are offered:

- Applied Information and Data Science
- Banking and Finance
- Business Administration
- Business Psychology
- International Financial Management
- Real Estate

=== Social Work ===
The School of Social Work offers degree programmes in Social Work, Social Pedagogy and related social professions.

The earliest precursor institution of today’s School of Social Work was the Swiss Social-Charitable Women’s School (Schweizerische Sozial-Caritative Frauenschule), established in Lucerne in 1918. In 1943, it was officially recognised by the canton, and in 1952 it was renamed Soziale Frauenschule Luzern (SFL). It was again renamed in 1960, when it became the School of Social Work Lucerne (Schule für Sozialarbeit Luzern), at which time men were admitted for the first time. In 1990 it was renamed Higher Technical School of Social Work (Höhere Fachschule für Sozialarbeit, HFS).

In 1995 the HFS merged with the Evening School of Social Work (Abendschule für Soziale Arbeit, ASL) and the Higher Technical School of Sociocultural Animation (Höhere Fachschule für Soziokulturelle Animation, HFA). In 1999, the institution was integrated into the then University of Applied Sciences Central Switzerland (Fachhochschule Zentralschweiz), and in 2007 it became one of the HSLU’s Schools.

Dorothee Guggisberg serves as Dean of the Lucerne School of Social Work. With 135 members of staff, 870 students in degree programmes and around 1,900 participants in continuing education (as of 2025), it is one of the larger schools of social work in Switzerland.

==== Courses ====
The following bachelor’s degree programmes are available:

- Social Work
- Sociocultural Animation (Soziokultur)
- Social Pedagogy
- New Concepts and Innovation

The School also offers a master’s degree programme in Social Work, as well as a range of continuing education programmes (Master of Advanced Studies MAS, Diploma of Advanced Studies DAS, Certificate of Advanced Studies CAS, specialised courses and seminars) in areas including:

- Work Integration
- Disability and Quality of Life
- Education and Care
- Deviance, Violence and Victim Protection
- Urban and Regional Development
- Child and Adult Protection
- Methods and Procedures in Social Work
- Prevention and Health
- Social Management, Social Policy and Generations

In addition, the School offers bachelor’s and master’s degree programmes in Nursing.

Contributions to the theory and practice of social work are published by the School’s own interact imprint.

=== Design, Film and Art ===
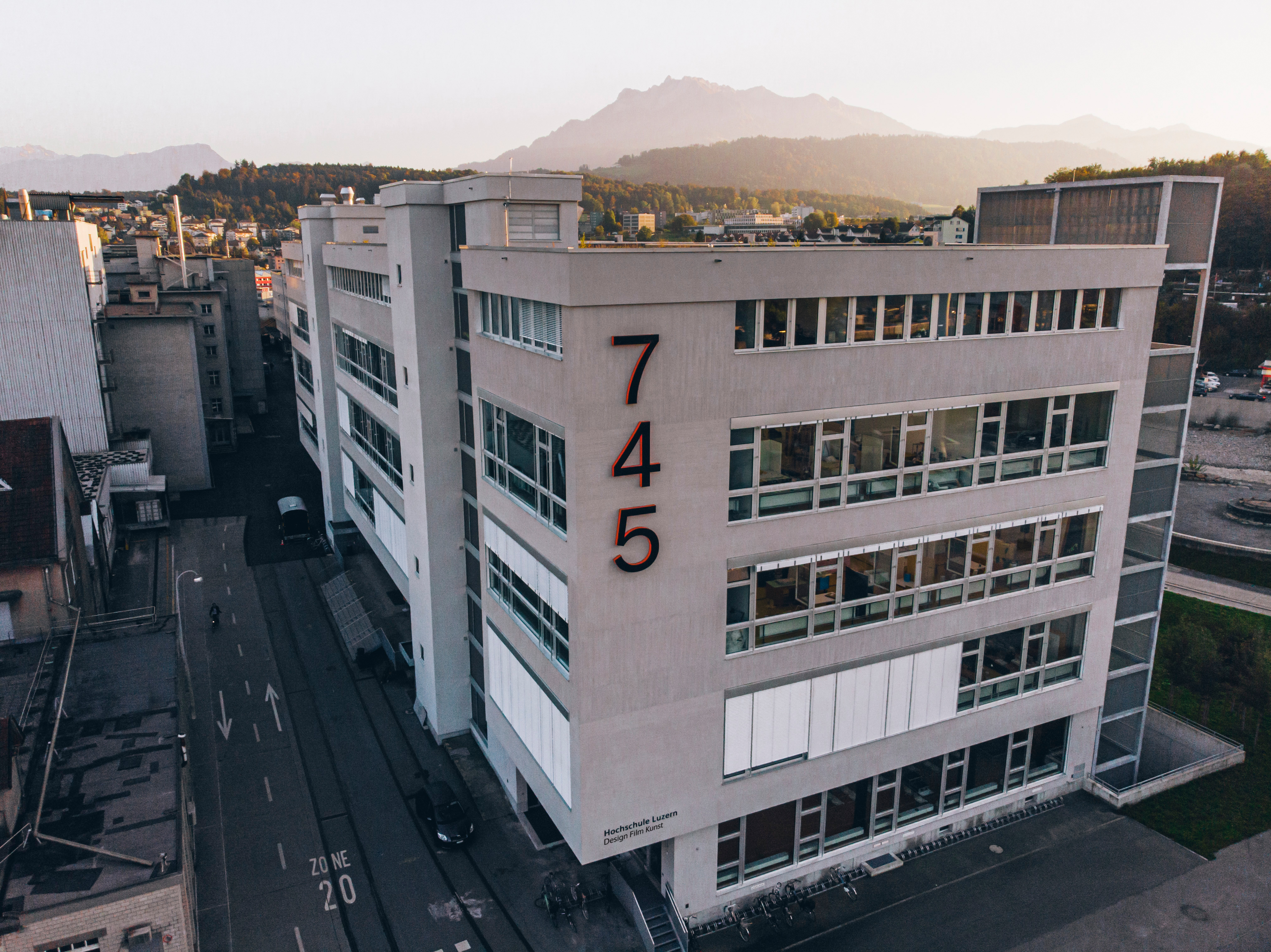
Emmenbrücke Campus of HSLU

The School of Design, Film and Art (until 2023: Design and Art) teaches creative and artistic subjects and offers degree programmes in disciplines including design, art, film and animation. Founded in 1877, it is the oldest art school in Switzerland. The Nidwalden painter Johann Melchior Wyrsch proposed the establishment of a drawing school to the Lucerne council in 1783 and began teaching in 1784. One of his successors, drawing teacher Seraphin Weingartner, developed a new school concept and in 1877 transformed the drawing school into the School of Applied Arts Lucerne (Kunstgewerbeschule Luzern). In its founding year, training programmes were offered mainly for professions such as carpentry, woodturning, wagon building, metalworking and stonemasonry.

Influenced by Bauhaus teaching methods, the profile of the Swiss schools of applied arts changed after World War II. Courses in visual communication, fine arts and aesthetic education were introduced to the detriment of programmes more focused on vocational training.

From 1972, the institution was called the School of Design (Schule für Gestaltung). From 1984, it offered tertiary-level programmes as the Higher Technical School of Design (Höhere Fachschule für Gestaltung, HFG). The first diploma at this level was awarded in Lucerne in 1988. In 1995 the School obtained university of applied sciences status as the University of Design and Art (Hochschule für Gestaltung und Kunst) and has been part of the HSLU since 2007.

Jacqueline Holzer has served as Dean since 1 March 2022.

==== Courses ====
- Foundation Course in Design (Gestalterischer Vorkurs)

Three bachelor’s degree programmes:

- Design (specialisations: Camera Arts; Data Design + Art; Design Management International; Digital Ideation; Graphic Design; Illustration (Fiction/Nonfiction); Object Design; Spatial Design; Textile Design; Transformation and Sustainability)
- Film (specialisations: Animation; Video)
- Art and Art Education

Seven master’s degree programmes in three areas:

- Master of Arts in Design, including Digital Ideation, Service Design and Eco-Social Design
- Master of Arts in Art, with the majors:
  - Knowledge to Society (KNOTS)
  - Critical Image and Situated Practices (CRISP)
  - Art Teaching (MAT)
- Master of Arts in Film and Master of Arts in Animation

=== Music ===
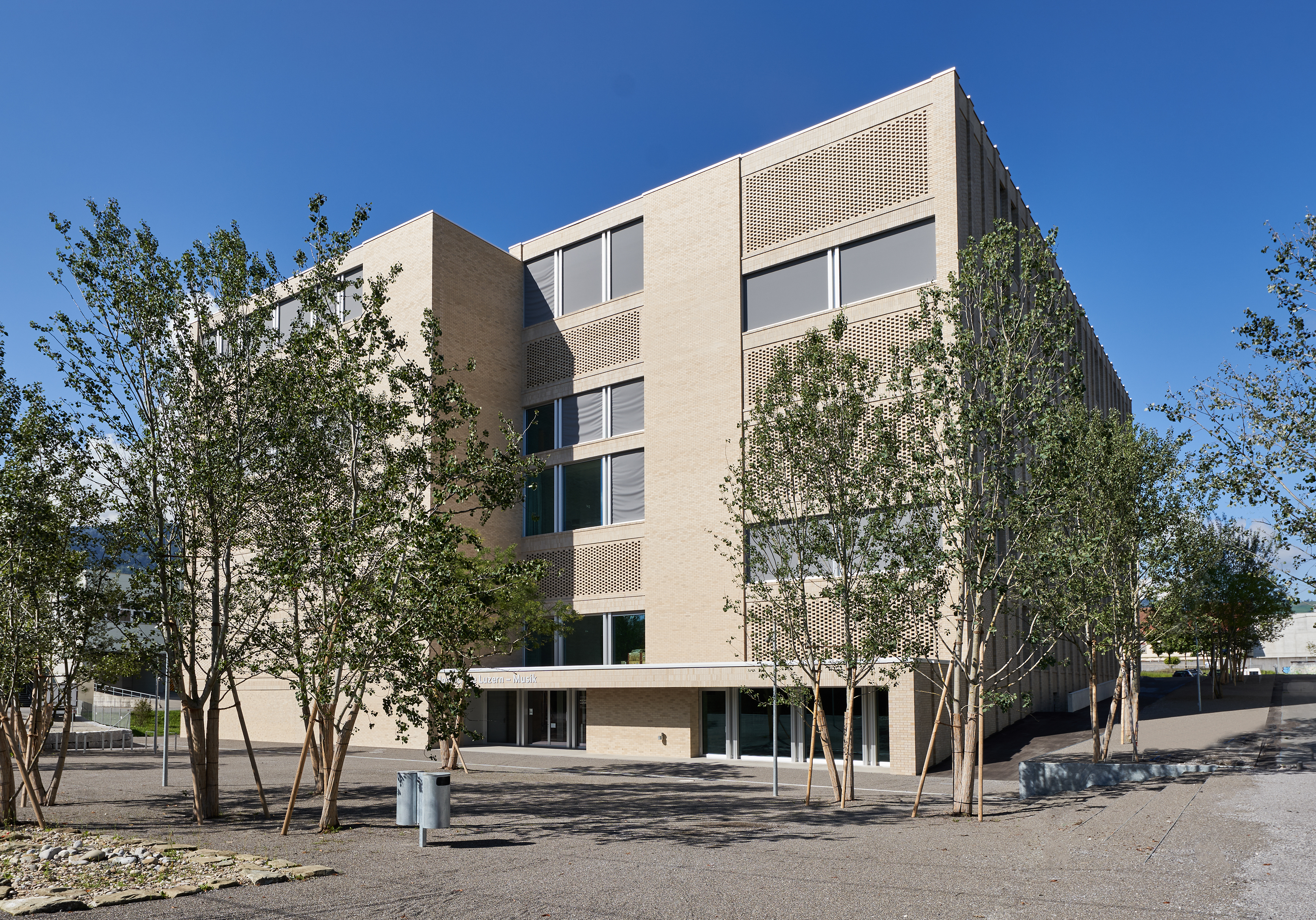
Kriens Campus of HSLU

The School of Music offers degree programmes in music and music education. Covering classical and applied subjects alike, it prepares students for professional activities in music or music teaching. The School was established in 1999 under the name Lucerne School of Music (Musikhochschule Luzern) through the merger of the Conservatory (founded in 1942), the Academy of School and Church Music (Akademie für Schul- und Kirchenmusik, founded in 1942) and the Jazz School Lucerne (Jazz Schule Luzern, founded in 1972).

Since September 2019, the President of the Lucerne School of Music has been Valentin Gloor. He succeeded Michael Kaufmann.

In 2020 the School brought together its previously four locations under one roof. The new building is located on the Südpol Campus (Campus Südpol) in Kriens. Its cultural activities include collaborations with institutions such as the Lucerne Festival Academy, the Lucerne Symphony Orchestra (LSO) (Luzerner Sinfonieorchester) and the Lucerne Theatre.

==== Courses ====
The following four bachelor’s programmes are available:

- Music (general) in the classical, jazz, or folk music profiles, with an emphasis on improvisation, composition, conducting/school music, as well as groove and electronics
- Music (specialised), with specialisations in Composition and Music Theory
- Music (professional qualification), with specialisations in Church Music and Wind Band Conducting
- Music and Movement (professional qualification)

Two master’s programmes are available:

- Master of Arts in Music, with specialisations in Classical Music, Jazz, Folk Music, Composition, Music Theory, Church Music, Wind Band Conducting, and Music and Movement
- Master of Arts in Music Education, with specialisations in Classical Performance, Jazz Performance, Solo Performance, Orchestra, Chamber Music, Church Music, Contemporary Music Performance, Music and Art Performance, Conducting, Composition, Music and Digital Creation, Artistic Research, Instrumental/Vocal Pedagogy, School Music II and Music Theory

== Research ==
The HSLU is active in research and development, carrying out interdisciplinary projects and maintaining collaboration with local and international companies, public institutions and other partners from business, society and culture. Thematic priorities include energy and sustainability, digitalisation, artificial intelligence, health, social innovation, design and blockchain technology.

The projects are funded through public subsidies from bodies such as Innosuisse and the Swiss National Science Foundation, federal funds and third-party contributions from business partners, foundations and international programmes. The Standing Committee for Research and Development is responsible for overall coordination.

== HSLU Foundation ==
The HSLU Foundation was established in 2016 as a legally independent foundation with the aim of supporting the HSLU. It provides financial support for research, scholarships and other projects outside the regular budget. It also acts as an intermediary between donors and projects. One example of the foundation's commitment is its ‘Giving Week’, during which donations are collected for students in financial need. In 2023, the foundation collected around CHF 26,000, which was then doubled by Zuger Kantonalbank.

On 1 April 2026, Ivan Buck will take over as Managing Director of the HSLU Foundation.

== Alumni organisation ==
HSLU Alumni is the organisation for graduates of the HSLU. Its purpose is to connect former students and maintain contact with the university after graduation. In addition to providing networking opportunities, HSLU Alumni also offers discounts for its members and organises events such as workshops.

Originally, each of the HSLU’s School had its own alumni association. In 2012, the four associations Absolventen Fachhochschule Zentralschweiz Technik & Architektur, Alumni Hochschule Luzern Wirtschaft, AlumniHSA and F&FHGK Luzern merged to form a single alumni organisation. It is the largest alumni association in Switzerland.

== Literature ==
- Balmer, Beat (2010). Vom Atis zur Hochschule: berufsbegleitende Ingenieur- und Architekturstudien in der Zentralschweiz 1946–2009 [From Atis to university: part-time engineering and architecture studies in Central Switzerland 1946–2009] (in German). Kriens / Luzern: V. P. Herzog. ISBN 978-3-033-02289-8

== See also ==
- List of largest universities by enrollment in Switzerland
